= 2000 Arizona Wildcats football team =

American college football season

2000 Arizona Wildcats football
- Conference: Pacific-10 Conference
- Record: 5–6 (3–5 Pac-10)
- Head coach: Dick Tomey (14th season)
- Offensive coordinator: Dino Babers (3rd season)
- Offensive scheme: Spread
- Defensive coordinator: Rich Ellerson (4th season)
- Base defense: 4–3
- Home stadium: Arizona Stadium

2000 Pacific-10 Conference football standings
	Conf.			Overall
Team	W		L	W		L
No. 4 Oregon State %+	7	–	1	11	–	1
No. 3 Washington $+	7	–	1	11	–	1
No. 7 Oregon +	7	–	1	10	–	2
Stanford	4	–	4	5	–	6
UCLA	3	–	5	6	–	6
Arizona State	3	–	5	6	–	6
Arizona	3	–	5	5	–	6
USC	2	–	6	5	–	7
Washington State	2	–	6	4	–	7
California	2	–	6	3	–	8
$ – BCS representative as conference champion; % – BCS at-large representative; + – Conference co-champions; Rankings from AP Poll

The 2000 Arizona Wildcats football team represented the University of Arizona as a member of the Pacific-10 Conference (Pac-10) during the 2000 NCAA Division I-A football season. Led by Dick Tomey in his 14th and final season as head coach, the Wildcats compiled an overall record of 5–6 with a mark of 3–5 in conference play, placing in a three-way tie for fifth in the Pac-10. The team played home games at Arizona Stadium in Tucson, Arizona.

After starting the season at 5–1, Arizona was in the running for a conference title and a berth in the Rose Bowl, but the Wildcats lost their final five games due to offensive mistakes and a poor defense, which prevented them from reaching a bowl game and leading to Tomey's resignation.

== Schedule ==
Date	Time	Opponent	Rank	Site	TV	Result	Attendance
September 2	7:00 p.m.	at Utah*		Rice–Eccles Stadium; Salt Lake City, UT	ESPN2	W 17–3	41,352
September 9	7:15 p.m.	No. 18 Ohio State*		Arizona Stadium; Tucson, AZ	FSN	L 17–27	57,367
September 16	7:00 p.m.	San Diego State*		Arizona Stadium; Tucson, AZ	FSNAZ	W 17–3	44,973
September 30	2:00 p.m.	at Stanford		Stanford Stadium; Palo Alto, CA	FSN	W 27–3	31,165
October 7	12:30 p.m.	at No. 18 USC		Los Angeles Memorial Coliseum; Los Angeles, CA	ABC	W 31–15	49,342
October 14	7:00 p.m.	Washington State	No. 22	Arizona Stadium; Tucson, AZ	KWBA	W 53–47 ^{3OT}	50,350
October 21	7:15 p.m.	at No. 7 Oregon	No. 21	Autzen Stadium; Eugene, OR	FSN	L 10–14	45,950
October 28	4:00 p.m.	UCLA	No. 24	Arizona Stadium; Tucson, AZ	ABC	L 24–27	45,540
November 4	1:30 p.m.	at No. 8 Washington		Husky Stadium; Seattle, WA	ABC	L 32–35	70,411
November 11	8:15 p.m.	No. 10 Oregon State^{†}		Arizona Stadium; Tucson, AZ	FSN	L 9–33	44,109
November 24	4:00 p.m.	Arizona State		Arizona Stadium; Tucson, AZ (rivalry)	FSN	L 17–30	54,297
*Non-conference game; ^{†}Homecoming; Rankings from AP Poll released prior to the game; All times are in Mountain time

== Rankings ==
Ranking movements Legend: ██ Increase in ranking ██ Decrease in ranking — = Not ranked
	Week																
Poll	Pre	1	2	3	4	5	6	7	8	9	10	11	12	13	14	15	Final
AP	—	—	—	—	—	—	—	22	21	24	—	—	—	—	—	—	—
Coaches Poll	—	—	—	—	—	—	—	22	20	23	—	—	—	—	—	—	—
BCS	Not released									—	—	—	—	—	—	—	Not released

== Before the season ==
After Arizona ended the 1999 season with a 6–6 record and no bowl appearance, many fans believed that the Wildcats didn't live up to expectations after a 12-win 1998 season. The Wildcats had entered 1999 with Rose Bowl and national title aspirations before losing the opener to Penn State and the rest of the season went down with it.

The team had to rebuild by entering the 2000 season by replacing several talented players on offense, as running back Trung Canidate, wide receiver Dennis Northcutt, and quarterback Keith Smith all graduated and/or went to the NFL, though quarterback Ortege Jenkins and receiver Bobby Wade returned and hoped to turn the Wildcats back to their winning ways.

In the summer, Arizona upgraded its uniforms. Though the uniforms were the same, the only difference was that the players’ names and numbers changed into a futuristic font, as 2000 was a turn of new hope for the program.

By the preseason, Arizona went unranked in the polls and Tomey was put on the hot seat, as the Wildcats needed to win to save his job after underachieving in 1999. Tomey believed that the team would recover and contend for a bowl.

== Game summaries ==
=== at Utah ===
Arizona Wildcats (0–0) at Utah Utes (0–0) – Game summary

Quarter	1	2	3	4	Total
Wildcats	0	0	17	0	17
Utes	0	3	0	0	3

at Rice-Eccles Stadium • Salt Lake City, UT

- Date: September 2, 2000
- Game time: 7:00 p.m.
- Game attendance: 41,352
- TV announcers (ESPN2): Mark Jones (play-by-play), Gino Torretta (analyst), and Holly Rowe (sideline reporter)

Game information

First quarter

None

Second quarter

- (0:05) UTAH – Golden Whetman 46-yard field goal (Drive: 6 plays, 51 yards, 1:05; Utah 3–0)

Third quarter

- (13:21) ARIZ – Adrian Koch 10-yard fumble return, Sean Keel kick (Arizona 7–3)
- (9:52) ARIZ – Larry Croom 13-yard run, Sean Keel kick (Drive: 3 plays, 29 yards, 1:19; Arizona 14–3)
- (2:52) ARIZ – Sean Keel 44-yard field goal (Drive: 9 plays, 54 yards, 2:53; Arizona 17–3)

Fourth quarter

None

Statistics	ARIZ	UTAH
First downs	9	21
Total yards	146	370
Rushes–yards	39–135	39–60
Passing yards	11	310
Passing: Comp–Att–Int	3–15–0	21–51–2
Time of possession	25:23	34:37

Team	Category	Player	Statistics
Arizona	Passing	Ortege Jenkins	3/15, 11 yards
Arizona	Rushing	Leo Mills Jr.	16 carries, 74 yards
Arizona	Receiving	Brandon Marshall	1 reception, 14 yards
Utah	Passing	T.D. Croshaw	10/29, 159 yards
Utah	Rushing	D'Shaun Crockett	17 carries, 41 yards
Utah	Receiving	Cliff Russell	10 receptions, 141 yards

=== vs No. 18 Ohio State ===
No. 18 Ohio State Buckeyes (1–0) vs Arizona Wildcats (1–0) – Game summary

Quarter	1	2	3	4	Total
No. 18 Buckeyes	3	7	14	3	27
Wildcats	7	10	0	0	17

at Arizona Stadium • Tucson, AZ

- Date: September 9, 2000
- Game time: 7:15 p.m.
- Game weather: Partly cloudy, 95 °F (35 °C)
- Game attendance: 57,367
- Referee: Pat Flood
- TV announcers (Fox Sports Net): Steve Physioc (play-by-play), Tom Ramsey (analyst), and Lisa Malosky (sideline reporter)

Game information

First quarter

- (6:41) ARIZ – Ortege Jenkins 10-yard run, Sean Keel kick (Drive: 2 plays, 9 yards, 0:39; Arizona 7–0)
- (3:09) OSU – Dan Stultz 26-yard field goal (Drive: 5 plays, 8 yards, 1:49; Arizona 7–3)

Second quarter

- (14:11) OSU – Tim Cheatwood 1-yard pass from Steve Bellisari, Dan Stultz kick (Drive: 8 plays, 74 yards, 2:15; Ohio State 10–7)
- (7:29) ARIZ – Team safety (Ohio State 10–9)
- (6:11) ARIZ – Bobby Wade 60-yard pass from Ortege Jenkins, Ortege Jenkins run for two-point conversion (Drive: 3 plays, 63 yards, 1:18; Arizona 17–10)

Third quarter

- (7:53) OSU – Chad Cacchio 60-yard pass from Steve Bellisari, Dan Stultz kick (Drive: 4 plays, 84 yards, 1:34; Tied 17–17)
- (2:44) OSU – Jonathan Wells 1-yard run, Dan Stultz kick (Drive: 9 plays, 72 yards, 3:31; Ohio State 24–17)

Fourth quarter

- (12:52) OSU – Dan Stultz 20-yard field goal (Drive: 7 plays, 21 yards, 2:28; Ohio State 27–17)

Statistics	OSU	ARIZ
First downs	12	11
Total yards	341	194
Rushes–yards	40–101	39–57
Passing yards	240	137
Passing: Comp–Att–Int	12–20–1	11–23–0
Time of possession	27:13	32:47

Team	Category	Player	Statistics
Ohio State	Passing	Steve Bellisari	12/20, 240 yards, 2 TD, INT
Ohio State	Rushing	Derek Combs	13 carries, 53 yards
Ohio State	Receiving	Chad Cacchio	1 reception, 60 yards, TD
Arizona	Passing	Ortege Jenkins	11/23, 137 yards, TD
Arizona	Rushing	Larry Croom	10 carries, 32 yards
Arizona	Receiving	Bobby Wade	4 receptions, 93 yards, TD

After defeating Utah on the road to start the season, the Wildcats hosted Ohio State in the home opener. After outplaying the Buckeyes in the first half to lead 17–10 at halftime, Arizona would struggle as Ohio State took control and shut out the Wildcats in the second half and Arizona’s record evened at 1-1. To date, this is Ohio State’s first and only trip to Tucson and it remains the most recent meeting between the two teams.

=== vs San Diego State ===
San Diego State Aztecs (0–2) vs Arizona Wildcats (1–1) – Game summary

Quarter	1	2	3	4	Total
Aztecs	0	3	0	0	3
Wildcats	0	7	3	7	17

at Arizona Stadium • Tucson, AZ

- Date: September 16, 2000
- Game time: 7:00 p.m.
- Game weather: Clear, 99 °F (37 °C)
- Game attendance: 44,973
- Referee: Chuck McFerrin
- TV announcers (Fox Sports Net Arizona): Dave Sitton (play-by-play), Chuck Cecil (analyst), and Dana Cooper (sideline reporter)

Game information

First quarter

- None

Second quarter

- (5:33) SDSU – Nate Tandberg 45-yard field goal (Drive: 5 plays, 6 yards, 1:52; San Diego State 3–0)
- (0:12) ARIZ – Malosi Leonard 14-yard pass from Ortege Jenkins, Sean Keel kick (Drive: 8 plays, 62 yards, 0:57; Arizona 7–3)

Third quarter

- (7:16) ARIZ – Sean Keel 41-yard field goal (Drive: 9 plays, 56 yards, 4:24; Arizona 10–3)

Fourth quarter

- (9:45) ARIZ – Andrae Thurman 34-yard blocked punt return, Sean Keel kick (Arizona 17–3)

Statistics	SDSU	ARIZ
First downs	14	19
Total yards	196	385
Rushes–yards	37–72	36–185
Passing yards	124	200
Passing: Comp–Att–Int	15–29–1	19–31–1
Time of possession	31:47	28:13

Team	Category	Player	Statistics
San Diego State	Passing	Lon Sheriff	15/29, 124 yards, INT
San Diego State	Rushing	Larry Ned	29 carries, 85 yards
San Diego State	Receiving	J. R. Tolver	5 receptions, 38 yards
Arizona	Passing	Ortege Jenkins	19/29, 200 yards, TD, INT
Arizona	Rushing	Clarence Farmer	13 carries, 95 yards
Arizona	Receiving	Andrae Thurman	6 receptions, 82 yards

=== at Stanford ===
Arizona Wildcats (2–1) at Stanford Cardinal (2–1) – Game summary

Quarter	1	2	3	4	Total
Wildcats	13	7	0	7	27
Cardinal	0	0	3	0	3

at Stanford Stadium • Stanford, CA

- Date: September 30, 2000
- Game time: 2:00 p.m.
- Game weather: Clear, Hot, 80 °F (27 °C)
- Game attendance: 31,165
- Referee: Jack Sprenger
- TV: Fox Sports Net

Game information

First quarter

- (9:54) ARIZ – Sean Keel 33-yard field goal (Drive: 4 plays, 6 yards, 1:28; Arizona 3–0)
- (7:57) ARIZ – Brad Brennan 36-yard pass from Ortege Jenkins, Sean Keel kick (Drive: 1 play, 36 yards, 0:08; Arizona 10–0)
- (2:02) ARIZ – Sean Keel 35-yard field goal (Drive: 12 plays, 25 yards, 5:09; Arizona 13–0)

Second quarter

- (14:25) ARIZ – Clarence Farmer 3-yard run, Sean Keel kick (Drive: 2 plays, 49 yards, 0:28; Arizona 20–0)

Third quarter

- (5:54) STAN – Mike Biselli 30-yard field goal (Drive: 11 plays, 85 yards, 4:20; Arizona 20–3)

Fourth quarter

- (10:49) ARIZ – Idris Haroon 32-yard fumble return, Sean Keel kick (Arizona 27–3)

Statistics	ARIZ	STAN
First downs	17	13
Total yards	390	245
Rushes–yards	46–192	30–68
Passing yards	198	177
Passing: Comp–Att–Int	12–23–1	14–32–2
Time of possession	34:33	25:27

Team	Category	Player	Statistics
Arizona	Passing	Ortege Jenkins	12/22, 198 yards, TD, INT
Arizona	Rushing	Clarence Farmer	18 carries, 116 yards, TD
Arizona	Receiving	Bobby Wade	5 receptions, 74 yards
Stanford	Passing	Chris Lewis	14/32, 177 yards, 2 INT
Stanford	Rushing	Kerry Carter	9 carries, 37 yards
Stanford	Receiving	DeRonnie Pitts	5 receptions, 52 yards

=== at No. 22 USC ===
Arizona Wildcats (3–1) at No. 22 USC Trojans (3–1) – Game summary

Quarter	1	2	3	4	Total
Wildcats	21	0	7	3	31
No. 22 Trojans	0	6	3	6	15

at Los Angeles Memorial Coliseum • Los Angeles, CA

- Date: October 7, 2000
- Game time: 12:30 p.m.
- Game weather: Hazy, 70 °F (21 °C)
- Game attendance: 49,342
- Referee: Jay Stricherz
- TV announcers (ABC): Keith Jackson (play-by-play), Tim Brant (analyst), and Todd Harris (sideline reporter)

Game information

First quarter

- (14:33) ARIZ – Bobby Wade 75-yard pass from Ortege Jenkins, Sean Keel kick (Drive: 3 plays, 80 yards, 0:21; Arizona 7–0)
- (6:59) ARIZ – Ortege Jenkins 1-yard run, Sean Keel kick (Drive: 5 plays, 28 yards, 2:35; Arizona 14–0)
- (1:08) ARIZ – Clarence Farmer 80-yard run, Sean Keel kick (Drive: 1 play, 80 yards, 0:11; Arizona 21–0)

Second quarter

- (1:19) USC – Petros Papadakis 1-yard run, kick failed (Drive: 6 plays, 28 yards, 2:16; Arizona 21–6)

Third quarter

- (10:21) USC – John Wall 27-yard field goal (Drive: 13 plays, 56 yards, 4:39; Arizona 21–9)
- (5:10) ARIZ – Ortege Jenkins 4-yard run, Sean Keel kick (Drive: 3 plays, 19 yards, 1:04; Arizona 28–9)

Fourth quarter

- (9:17) ARIZ – Sean Keel 29-yard field goal (Drive: 4 plays, 8 yards, 2:27; Arizona 31–9)
- (0:29) USC – Matt Nickels 7-yard pass from Carson Palmer, kick failed (Drive: 9 plays, 70 yards, 2:28; Arizona 31–15)

Statistics	ARIZ	USC
First downs	10	18
Total yards	253	331
Rushing yards	44–117	27–10
Passing yards	136	321
Passing: Comp–Att–Int	7–13–1	26–50–3
Time of possession	29:39	30:21

Team	Category	Player	Statistics
Arizona	Passing	Ortege Jenkins	6/12, 110 yards, TD, INT
Arizona	Rushing	Clarence Farmer	22 carries, 134 yards, TD
Arizona	Receiving	Bobby Wade	4 receptions, 102 yards, TD
USC	Passing	Carson Palmer	26/50, 321 yards, TD, 3 INT
USC	Rushing	Sultan McCullough	13 carries, 32 yards
USC	Receiving	Keary Colbert	6 receptions, 113 yards

Arizona visited the Coliseum to face 22nd-ranked USC. In the opening minute, the Wildcats struck first on a 75-yard pass from Jenkins to Wade. They would add another long score later in the quarter to break it open. Arizona’s defense would shut down the Trojans’ elite offense and blocked two extra points after USC scored its touchdowns, and earned a victory over USC for the second consecutive season.

=== vs Washington State ===
Washington State Cougars (3–2) vs No. 22 Arizona Wildcats (4–1) – Game summary

Quarter	1	2	3	4	OT	2OT	3OT	Total
Cougars	13	6	0	14	7	7	0	47
No. 22 Wildcats	7	7	6	13	7	7	6	53

at Arizona Stadium • Tucson, AZ

- Date: October 14, 2000
- Game time: 7:00 p.m.
- Game weather: Clear, 72 °F (22 °C)
- Game attendance: 50,350
- Referee: Jim Fogltance
- TV announcers (KWBA): Dave Sitton (play-by-play), Chuck Cecil (analyst), and Dana Cooper (sideline reporter)

Game information

First quarter

- (11:05) WSU – Milton Wynn 14-yard pass from Jason Gesser, Anousith Wilaikul kick (Drive: 6 plays, 36 yards, 3:34; Washington State 7–0)
- (5:39) ARIZ – Brandon Marshall 56-yard pass from Ortege Jenkins, Sean Keel kick (Drive: 3 plays, 56 yards, 1:29; Tied 7–7)
- (4:29) WSU – Deon Burnett 68-yard pass from Jason Gesser, kick failed (Drive: 3 plays, 74 yards, 1:10; Washington State 13–7)

Second quarter

- (5:12) WSU – Nakoa McElrath 54-yard pass from Jason Gesser, two-point run failed (Drive: 4 plays, 47 yards, 2:28; Washington State 19–7)
- (1:07) ARIZ – Bobby Wade 14-yard pass from Ortege Jenkins, Sean Keel kick (Drive: 9 plays, 67 yards, 4:05; Washington State 19–14)

Third quarter

- (5:09) ARIZ – Alex Luna 17-yard fumble return, two-point pass failed (Arizona 20–19)

Fourth quarter

- (14:52) ARIZ – Clarence Farmer 1-yard run, two-point run failed (Drive: 9 plays, 53 yards, 3:49; Arizona 26–19)
- (13:19) WSU – Nakoa McElrath 19-yard pass from Jason Gesser, Anousith Wilaikul kick (Drive: 4 plays, 78 yards, 1:33; Tied 26–26)
- (9:03) WSU – Chris Martin 31-yard interception return, Anousith Wilaikul kick (Washington State 33–26)
- (5:31) ARIZ – Mike Detwiler 1-yard pass from Ortege Jenkins, Sean Keel kick (Drive: 6 plays, 67 yards, 3:32; Tied 33–33)

First overtime

- ARIZ – Ortege Jenkins 25-yard run, Sean Keel kick (Arizona 40–33)
- WSU – Milton Wynn 23-yard pass from Jason Gesser, Anousith Wilaikul kick (Tied 40–40)

Second overtime

- WSU – Nakoa McElrath 19-yard pass from Jason Gesser, Anousith Wilaikul kick (Washington State 47–40)
- ARIZ – Leo Mills Jr. 1-yard run, Sean Keel kick (Tied 47–47)

Third overtime

- ARIZ – Leo Mills Jr. 2-yard run, two-point pass failed (Arizona 53–47)

Statistics	WSU	ARIZ
First downs	19	22
Total yards	490	490
Rushes–yards	34–112	57–254
Passing yards	378	236
Passing: Comp–Att–Int	20–37–2	15–31–2
Time of possession	26:05	33:55

Team	Category	Player	Statistics
Washington State	Passing	Jason Gesser	19/36, 348 yards, 6 TD, 2 INT
Washington State	Rushing	Dave Minnich	12 carries, 101 yards
Washington State	Receiving	Nakoa McElrath	5 receptions, 106 yards. 3 TD
Arizona	Passing	Ortege Jenkins	15/30, 236 yards, 3 TD, 2 INT
Arizona	Rushing	Leo Mills Jr.	19 carries, 129 yards, 2 TD
Arizona	Receiving	Bobby Wade	6 receptions, 112 yards, TD

The Wildcats, now back in the rankings (22nd), hosted Washington State in their next game. They would battle the Cougars back and forth for most of the game as they would trade scores all night. With the game tied at 33 late in the fourth quarter, Arizona had a chance at the win, but would miss a field goal that hit the goal post and the game went to overtime.

After both teams traded touchdowns in the first two overtime periods, the Wildcats scored in the third frame to regain the lead. However, they would fail on a two-point try, leaving Washington State with a chance to win with a touchdown and the two-point conversion. On the Cougars’ first play, the Wildcats would intercept a pass to end the game and gave Arizona a wild victory. The win put the Wildcats in first place in the Pac-10 and moved them a step closer for a potential chance at the Rose Bowl.

=== at No. 7 Oregon ===
No. 21 Arizona Wildcats (5–1) at No. 7 Oregon Ducks (5–1) – Game summary

Quarter	1	2	3	4	Total
No. 21 Wildcats	0	10	0	0	10
No. 7 Ducks	7	7	0	0	14

at Autzen Stadium • Eugene, OR

- Date: October 21, 2000
- Game time: 7:15 p.m.
- Game weather: Chance of rain, 54 °F (12 °C)
- Game attendance: 45,950
- Referee: Gordon Riese
- TV announcers (Fox Sports Net): Steve Physioc (play-by-play), Tom Ramsey (analyst), Lewis Johnson (sideline reporter)

Game information

First quarter

- (7:37) ORE – Marshaun Tucker 25-yard pass from Joey Harrington, Josh Frankel kick (Drive: 7 plays, 56 yards, 3:10; Oregon 7–0)

Second quarter

- (7:08) ORE – Marshaun Tucker 20-yard pass from Joey Harrington, Josh Frankel kick (Drive: 3 plays, 22 yards, 0:54; Oregon 14–0)
- (5:45) ARIZ – Larry Croom 58-yard pass from Ortege Jenkins, Sean Keel kick (Drive: 3 plays, 83 yards, 1:23; Oregon 14–7)
- (0:14) ARIZ – Sean Keel 34-yard field goal (Drive: 4 plays, 13 yards, 0:23; Oregon 14–10)

Third quarter

- None

Fourth quarter

- None

Statistics	ARIZ	ORE
First downs	11	14
Total yards	217	260
Rushes–yards	32–17	45–137
Passing yards	200	123
Passing: Comp–Att–Int	15–32–1	9–22–1
Time of possession	27:27	32:33

Team	Category	Player	Statistics
Arizona	Passing	Ortege Jenkins	15/31, 200 yards, TD, INT
Arizona	Rushing	Clarence Farmer	9 carries, 20 yards
Arizona	Receiving	Brad Brennan	6 receptions, 90 yards
Oregon	Passing	Joey Harrington	9/22, 123 yards, 2 TD, INT
Oregon	Rushing	Maurice Morris	34 carries, 114 yards
Oregon	Receiving	Marshaun Tucker	3 receptions, 59 yards, 2 TD

After their wild win over Washington State, the Wildcats traveled to Oregon to take on the seventh-ranked Ducks in a place where Arizona had not won since 1986, and became a difficult test for them in the quest for their goal. Oregon seemed to have the upper hand early, leading 14-0 before halftime. The Wildcats got back in it in the second half with ten unanswered points and had a chance to take the lead and possibly win it late for the upset, but would come up short as the Ducks held on for the win.

=== vs UCLA ===
UCLA Bruins (4–3) vs No. 24 Arizona Wildcats (5–2) – Game summary

Quarter	1	2	3	4	Total
Bruins	14	0	6	7	27
No. 24 Wildcats	7	14	0	3	24

at Arizona Stadium • Tucson, AZ

- Date: October 28, 2000
- Game time: 4:00 p.m.
- Game weather: Partly sunny, 62 °F (17 °C)
- Game attendance: 45,540
- Referee: Jay Stricherz
- TV announcers (ABC): Sean Grande (play-by-play) and David Norrie (analyst)

Game information

First quarter

- (11:59) ARIZ – Keoni Fraser 36-yard interception return, Sean Keel kick (Arizona 7–0)
- (7:08) UCLA – DeShaun Foster 1-yard run, Chris Griffith kick (Drive: 12 plays, 77 yards, 4:51; Tied 7–7)
- (1:57) UCLA – Brian Poli-Dixon 18-yard pass from Cory Paus, Chris Griffith kick (Drive: 6 plays, 17 yards, 3:17; UCLA 14–7)

Second quarter

- (8:16) ARIZ – Clarence Farmer 2-yard run, Sean Keel kick (Drive: 8 plays, 58 yards, 3:59; Tied 14–14)
- (1:22) ARIZ – Clarence Farmer 19-yard run, Sean Keel kick (Drive: 6 plays, 50 yards, 0:45; Arizona 21–14)

Third quarter

- (9:04) UCLA – Chris Griffith 33-yard field goal (Drive: 8 plays, 15 yards, 2:15; Arizona 21–17)
- (5:55) UCLA – Chris Griffith 33-yard field goal (Drive: 4 plays, -3 yards, 1:33; Arizona 21–20)

Fourth quarter

- (8:24) ARIZ – Sean Keel 42-yard field goal (Drive: 8 plays, 32 yards, 4:13; Arizona 24–20)
- (0:48) UCLA – Cory Paus 13-yard run, Chris Griffith kick (Drive: 8 plays, 66 yards, 1:59; UCLA 27–24)

Statistics	UCLA	ARIZ
First downs	17	15
Total yards	284	316
Rushes–yards	39–54	45–211
Passing yards	230	105
Passing: Comp–Att–Int	19–35–2	7–18–4
Time of possession	31:52	28:08

Team	Category	Player	Statistics
UCLA	Passing	Cory Paus	19/35, 230 yards, TD, 2 INT
UCLA	Rushing	DeShaun Foster	29 carries, 78 yards, TD
UCLA	Receiving	Freddie Mitchell	7 receptions, 94 yards
Arizona	Passing	Ortege Jenkins	7/18, 105 yards, 4 INT
Arizona	Rushing	Clarence Farmer	33 carries, 107 yards. 2 TD
Arizona	Receiving	Brad Brennan	1 reception, 41 yards

Arizona returned home to host UCLA. In the Bruins’ previous visit to Tucson (1998), they took down the Wildcats that kept Arizona out of the Rose Bowl/national title picture. Arizona would play tough and led late in the fourth quarter before UCLA drove down the field and scored with less than a minute remaining to grab the victory. The Wildcats were also hurt by turnovers, as Jenkins would throw four interceptions that led to the loss.

=== at No. 8 Washington ===
Arizona Wildcats (5–3) at No. 8 Washington Huskies (7–1) – Game summary

Quarter	1	2	3	4	Total
Wildcats	9	7	9	7	32
No. 8 Huskies	7	3	3	22	35

at Husky Stadium • Seattle, WA

- Date: November 4, 2000
- Game time: 1:30 p.m.
- Game attendance: 70,411
- TV announcers (ABC): Keith Jackson (play-by-play), Tim Brant (analyst), and Todd Harris (sideline reporter)

Game information

First quarter

- (13:00) ARIZ – Sean Keel 36-yard field goal (Drive: 6 plays, 58 yards, 2:00; Arizona 3–0)
- (2:05) ARIZ – Leo Mills Jr. 10-yard run, kick failed (Drive: 13 plays, 84 yards, 6:03; Arizona 9–0)
- (1:14) WASH – Marques Tuiasosopo 1-yard run, John Anderson kick (Drive: 3 plays, 67 yards, 0:51; Arizona 9–7)

Second quarter

- (10:44) ARIZ – Mike Detwiler 4-yard run, Sean Keel kick (Drive: 12 plays, 80 yards, 5:30; Arizona 16–7)
- (8:56) WASH – John Anderson 39-yard field goal (Drive: 4 plays, 6 yards, 1:48; Arizona 16–10)

Third quarter

- (13:01) ARIZ – Bobby Wade 60-yard punt return, two-point run failed (Arizona 22–10)
- (7:11) ARIZ – Sean Keel 38-yard field goal (Drive: 7 plays, 41 yards, 2:30; Arizona 25–10)
- (3:36) WASH – John Anderson 38-yard field goal (Drive: 10 plays, 45 yards, 3:35; Arizona 25–13)

Fourth quarter

- (10:51) WASH – Willie Hurst 65-yard run, John Anderson kick (Drive: 2 plays, 65 yards, 0:18; Arizona 25–20)
- (8:31) WASH – Willie Hurst 23-yard run, Willie Hurst run for two-point conversion (Drive: 4 plays, 42 yards, 1:10; Washington 28–25)
- (4:48) ARIZ – Leo Mills Jr. 51-yard run, Sean Keel kick (Drive: 5 plays, 77 yards, 1:39; Arizona 32–28)
- (1:10) WASH – Marques Tuiasosopo 2-yard run, John Anderson kick (Drive: 11 plays, 67 yards, 3:38; Washington 35–32)

Statistics	ARIZ	WASH
First downs	26	18
Total yards	471	407
Rushes–yards	34–263	34–211
Passing yards	208	196
Passing: Comp–Att–Int	13–34–0	17–34–1
Time of possession	35:17	24:43

Team	Category	Player	Statistics
Arizona	Passing	Ortege Jenkins	13/33, 208 yards
Arizona	Rushing	Leo Mills Jr.	29 carries, 185 yards, 2 TD
Arizona	Receiving	Bobby Wade	7 receptions, 76 yards
Washington	Passing	Marques Tuiasosopo	17/34, 196 yards, INT
Washington	Rushing	Willie Hurst	8 carries, 116 yards, 2 TD
Washington	Receiving	Jerramy Stevens	8 receptions, 93 yards

Looking to get back to the win column, the Wildcats traveled to Seattle to play Washington in another tough road test, as the Huskies were ranked eighth and in the hunt for the conference title. Arizona would outplay Washington in the early part of the game, and led 22–10 in the third quarter on Wade’s punt return for a touchdown and an upset was within the Wildcats’ reach. However, the Huskies showed why they were contending for the Rose Bowl, as they would storm back by the fourth quarter with a 22–7 run and took the lead with a touchdown with over a minute to play. Arizona had a final chance to possibly tie it, but Washington would block a field goal attempt as time expired to give the Wildcats yet another devastating defeat and ended their Rose Bowl hopes for good. The Huskies’ win turned out to be revenge for their loss to Jenkins and the Wildcats in the teams’ previous game in Seattle in 1998 when Arizona won on Jenkins’ wild touchdown despite Washington winning in Tucson in 1999.

=== vs No. 10 Oregon State ===
No. 10 Oregon State Beavers (8–1) vs Arizona Wildcats (5–4) – Game summary

Quarter	1	2	3	4	Total
No. 10 Beavers	6	17	0	10	33
Wildcats	3	0	6	0	9

at Arizona Stadium • Tucson, AZ

- Date: November 11, 2000
- Game time: 8:15 p.m.
- Game weather: Partly cloudy, 52 °F (11 °C)
- Game attendance: 44,109
- Referee: Gordon Riese
- TV announcers (Fox Sports Net): Steve Physioc (play-by-play), Tom Ramsey (analyst), Lewis Johnson (sideline reporter)

Game information

First quarter

- (10:39) ARIZ – Sean Keel 42-yard field goal (Drive: 11 plays, 43 yards, 4:21; Arizona 3–0)
- (7:06) OSU – Ryan Cesca 23-yard field goal (Drive: 9 plays, 59 yards, 3:33; Tied 3–3)
- (2:03) OSU – Ryan Cesca 44-yard field goal (Drive: 6 plays, 13 yards, 2:57; Oregon State 6–3)

Second quarter

- (13:48) OSU – Patrick McCall 1-yard run, Ryan Cesca kick (Drive: 8 plays, 41 yards, 2:12; Oregon State 13–3)
- (9:02) OSU – Chad Johnson 26-yard pass from Jonathan Smith, Ryan Cesca kick (Drive: 8 plays, 53 yards, 2:51; Oregon State 20–3)
- (2:16) OSU – Ryan Cesca 31-yard field goal (Drive: 8 plays, 58 yards, 4:00; Oregon State 23–3)

Third quarter

- (11:18) ARIZ – Sean Keel 31-yard field goal (Drive: 6 plays, 40 yards, 2:27; Oregon State 23–6)
- (5:58) ARIZ – Sean Keel 37-yard field goal (Drive: 7 plays, 32 yards, 3:05; Oregon State 23–9)

Fourth quarter

- (13:44) OSU – Ken Simonton 21-yard run, Ryan Cesca kick (Drive: 8 plays, 73 yards, 3:56; Oregon State 30–9)
- (6:40) OSU – Ryan Cesca 30-yard field goal (Drive: 6 plays, 27 yards, 3:26; Oregon State 33–9)

Statistics	OSU	ARIZ
First downs	22	9
Total yards	304	158
Rushes–yards	41–73	31–69
Passing yards	231	89
Passing: Comp–Att–Int	17–31–1	9–22–1
Time of possession	32:38	27:22

Team	Category	Player	Statistics
Oregon State	Passing	Jonathan Smith	17/31, 231 yards, TD, INT
Oregon State	Rushing	Ken Simonton	19 carries, 73 yards, TD
Oregon State	Receiving	Chad Johnson	7 receptions, 109 yards, TD
Arizona	Passing	Ortege Jenkins	6/17, 66 yards, INT
Arizona	Rushing	Clarence Farmer	9 carries, 61 yards
Arizona	Receiving	Bobby Wade	3 receptions, 38 yards

For homecoming weekend, as well as Veteran’s Day (November 11), the Wildcats hosted tenth-ranked Oregon State while continuing to look for a win after three consecutive heartbreaking losses. However, in another difficult test, Arizona would be no match for the Beavers, and only scored on three field goals for the whole game. Fans, angered by yet another loss, chanted for Tomey to be fired as the final minutes ran down. The defeat put the Wildcats in danger of missing a bowl game with a 5–5 record, and needed a win against their rivals in the finale to extend the season.

=== vs Arizona State ===
Arizona State Sun Devils (5–5) vs Arizona Wildcats (5–5) – Game summary

Quarter	1	2	3	4	Total
Sun Devils	3	3	14	10	30
Wildcats	3	7	7	0	17

at Arizona Stadium • Tucson, AZ

- Date: November 24, 2000
- Game time: 4:00 p.m.
- Game attendance: 54,297
- TV announcers (Fox Sports Net): Steve Physioc (play-by-play), Tom Ramsey (analyst), Lewis Johnson (sideline reporter)

Game information

First quarter

- (12:46) ASU – Mike Barth 39-yard field goal (Arizona State 3–0)
- (8:21) ARIZ – Sean Keel 25-yard field goal (Tied 3–3)

Second quarter

- (9:34) ARIZ – Ortege Jenkins 2-yard run, Sean Keel kick (Arizona 10–3)
- (0:11) ASU – Mike Barth 24-yard field goal (Arizona 10–6)

Third quarter

- (12:09) ASU – Mike Barth 13-yard run, Mike Barth kick (Arizona State 13–10)
- (8:21) ARIZ – Brandon Manumaleuna 14-yard pass from Ortege Jenkins, Sean Keel kick (Arizona 17–13)
- (6:00) ASU – Terrell Suggs 0-yard fumble return, Mike Barth kick (Arizona State 20–17)

Fourth quarter

- (14:55) ASU – Tom Pace 3-yard run, Mike Barth kick (Arizona State 27–17)
- (8:49) ASU – Mike Barth 48-yard field goal (Arizona State 30–17)

Statistics	ASU	ARIZ
First downs	15	21
Total yards	264	371
Rushes–yards	31–75	50–195
Passing yards	189	176
Passing: Comp–Att–Int	15–35–0	16–31–1
Time of possession	27:46	32:14

Team	Category	Player	Statistics
Arizona State	Passing	Jeff Krohn	15/35, 189 yards
Arizona State	Rushing	Tom Pace	16 carries, 31 yards, TD
Arizona State	Receiving	Richard Williams	4 receptions, 61 yards
Arizona	Passing	Ortege Jenkins	16/31, 176 yards, TD, INT
Arizona	Rushing	Clarence Farmer	11 carries, 82 yards
Arizona	Receiving	Brad Brennan	4 receptions, 72 yards

Arizona hosted rival Arizona State in the “Duel in the Desert”, needing a win to become bowl-eligible while a loss would end the season with speculation that Tomey would be out as coach.

The Sun Devils, who had announced that they would part ways with their coach, Bruce Snyder, after the season due to wins and losses, faced the Wildcats by not having to deal with Canidate and Northcutt anymore (as both were in the NFL) and also tried to end the year on a high note.

In the game, both teams would start slow. As it went on, ASU would outsmart Arizona with a trick play by having the kicker running for a touchdown after faking a field goal try. The play would shift momentum, as the Wildcats committed costly mistakes, including a fumble that was recovered for a touchdown by ASU, that would ultimately seal their fate. The loss would end the season with a five-game losing streak for the Wildcats.

After the game ended, Tomey resigned as coach, citing “public pressure” from the Tucson community due to the program’s inability to fulfill its goal to reach the Rose Bowl after several near-misses at it, which included the successful 1993 and 1998 seasons. Tomey finished with a record of 8–3–1 against ASU as coach.

== Roster ==
2000 Arizona Wildcats football team roster
Players
Coaches
Offense

Pos.	#	Name	Class
OL	72	Kevin Barry	Jr
RB	5	Larry Croom	So
OL	77	Makoa Freitas	So
TE	14	Peter Hansen	Jr
QB	16	Ortege Jenkins	Sr
QB	10	Jason Johnson	So
TE	90	Brandon Manumaleuna	Sr
OL	79	Marques McFadden	Sr
WR	3	Andrae Thurman	Fr
WR	1	Bobby Wade	So

Defense

Pos.	#	Name	Class
LB	27	Lance Briggs	So
LB	45	Antonio Pierce	Sr
DE	99	Joe Tafoya	Sr
DL	7	Ray Wells	So

Special teams

Pos.	#	Name	Class

Head coach

- Dick Tomey

Coordinators/assistant coaches

Legend

- (C) Team captain
- (S) Suspended
- (I) Ineligible
- Injured
- Redshirt

== Awards and honors ==
- Bobby Wade, WR, First-team All-Pac-10
- Lance Briggs, LB, First-team All-Pac-10
- Joe Tafoya, DL, First-team All-Pac-10
- Michael Jolivette, DB, Second-team All-Pac-10
- Peter Hansen, DL, Second-team All-Pac-10

== Season notes ==
- Arizona finished the season with a five-game losing streak after starting 5–1, with several fourth-quarter meltdowns during that span ultimately costing the Wildcats at least three victories and a potential larger bowl game.
- Tomey avenged his 1994 loss to Utah in the Freedom Bowl by defeating the Utes in the season opener.
- The Wildcats were originally going to play Penn State for their home opener, but due to fears that the Wildcats would never beat the Nittany Lions after their blowout loss to them in the previous year, they scheduled Ohio State instead. After the team lost to the Buckeyes, Arizona officials believed that the Wildcats lacked the superior talent that both Ohio State and Penn State had due to both being in the Big Ten. As a result, the Wildcats have not played either team since and it is unlikely that they will ever in the foreseeable future.
- Arizona would not beat both Stanford and Washington State again until 2006 and would also not beat USC again until 2009, with all three wins occurring on the road.
- After defeating Washington State in triple overtime, the Wildcats would not get another home win over the Cougars until 2007 and would also not win another Pac-10 home game again until 2003. In addition, Arizona would not win another game in October until 2005.
- As this was his final season at Arizona, Oregon was the only Pac-10 school that Tomey never beat on the road, with Arizona’s last win being in 1986, the year before he was hired. The closest that Tomey was to ever beating the Ducks in Eugene happened in 1994, when he lost by a single point. Arizona would finally beat Oregon in the road in 2006.
- The loss to Oregon State was the only game of the season in which the Wildcats failed to score a touchdown, as they only scored nine points on three field goals.
- The loss to ASU spelled the end for Tomey as he resigned due to not being able to compete for the Rose Bowl, leading to public pressure from fans. Tomey won 95 games with the Wildcats which remains to most by an Arizona football coach, which is unlikely to be surpassed unless a dominant Arizona coach wins more in the future. If not for the late-season collapse, Tomey would have likely remained the coach for 2001 and would have surpassed 100 wins.
- This was the last season in which Arizona Stadium had the word “Wildcats” in one end zone. Since then, both end zones read “Arizona” on them.

== After the season ==
Tomey’s resignation as coach stunned his players and the program as a whole. Players were in tears after hearing the news.

Offensive coordinator Dino Babers also resigned out of respect for Tomey and defensive coordinator Rich Ellerson was fired due to a poor defense, meaning that the Wildcats would have a new coaching staff for 2001. Both coordinators would later become future head coaches, as Ellerson formerly coached at Army and Babers currently in charge at Syracuse.

After a national search, Arizona hired former Illinois and Texas coach John Mackovic as Tomey’s successor. Mackovic had ties to Arizona, as he served as offensive coordinator under former coach Jim Young from 1973 to 1976. He would also bring back Larry Mac Duff as defensive coordinator, who served under Tomey from 1987 to 1996 and helped build the “Desert Swarm” defense.

The Mackovic era would become a disaster for the Wildcats as he would lose control of the program and became embroiled in controversy. The team declined in wins, and would lead to him being fired during the 2003 season. Also, it began an era of futility and decline for the football program, which would lead to fans becoming more interested in basketball (due to its success by winning) and losing support for football.
