= 2000 Oregon State Beavers football team =

American college football season

2000 Oregon State Beavers football

Pac-10 co-champion Fiesta Bowl champion

Fiesta Bowl, W 41–9 vs. Notre Dame
- Conference: Pacific-10 Conference

Ranking
- Coaches: No. 5
- AP: No. 4
- Record: 11–1 (7–1 Pac-10)
- Head coach: Dennis Erickson (2nd season)
- Offensive coordinator: Tim Lappano (2nd season)
- Offensive scheme: Single-back spread
- Defensive coordinator: Craig Bray (1st season)
- Base defense: 4–3
- Captains: Terrence Carroll; DeLawrence Grant; Darnell Robinson; Ken Simonton; Jonathan Smith
- Home stadium: Reser Stadium

2000 Pacific-10 Conference football standings
	Conf.			Overall
Team	W		L	W		L
No. 4 Oregon State %+	7	–	1	11	–	1
No. 3 Washington $+	7	–	1	11	–	1
No. 7 Oregon +	7	–	1	10	–	2
Stanford	4	–	4	5	–	6
UCLA	3	–	5	6	–	6
Arizona State	3	–	5	6	–	6
Arizona	3	–	5	5	–	6
USC	2	–	6	5	–	7
Washington State	2	–	6	4	–	7
California	2	–	6	3	–	8
$ – BCS representative as conference champion; % – BCS at-large representative; + – Conference co-champions; Rankings from AP Poll

The 2000 Oregon State Beavers football team represented Oregon State University as a member of the Pacific-10 Conference (Pac-10) during the 2000 NCAA Division I-A football season. Led by second-year head coach Dennis Erickson, the Beavers compiled an overall record of 11–1 with a mark of 7–1 in conference play, sharing the Pac-10 title with Oregon and Washington. Oregon State was invited to the Fiesta Bowl, where the Beavers defeated Notre Dame. The team played home games at Reser Stadium in Corvallis, Oregon.

The 2000 season was arguably the greatest season in the history of Oregon State Beavers football. The Beavers' shared of the Pac-10 title was the program first conference championship since the 1964 season. The Beavers also achieved their first win over the USC Trojans since the 1967 season. The three-point loss at Washington in early October kept the Beavers out of the Rose Bowl and denied their first outright conference title since the 1956 season. They routed tenth-ranked Notre Dame, 41–9, in the Fiesta Bowl to finish the season. The 11 wins remains an Oregon State single-season record.

== Schedule ==
Date	Time	Opponent	Rank	Site	TV	Result	Attendance	Source
September 2	3:30 pm	Eastern Washington*		Reser Stadium; Corvallis, OR		W 21–19	30,782	
September 9	5:05 pm	at New Mexico*		University Stadium; Albuquerque, NM		W 28–20	30,830	
September 23	3:30 pm	San Diego State*		Reser Stadium; Corvallis, OR		W 35–3	32,027	
September 30	3:30 pm	No. 8 USC		Reser Stadium; Corvallis, OR		W 31–21	33,775	
October 7	7:15 pm	at No. 11 Washington	No. 23	Husky Stadium; Seattle, WA	FSN	L 30–33	73,145	
October 14	3:30 pm	Stanford	No. 23	Reser Stadium; Corvallis, OR	FSN	W 38–6	34,777	
October 21	3:30 pm	at No. 23 UCLA	No. 19	Rose Bowl; Pasadena, CA		W 44–38	48,293	
October 28	7:15 pm	Washington State^{†}	No. 18	Reser Stadium; Corvallis, OR	FSN	W 38–9	34,491	
November 4	12:30 pm	at California	No. 14	California Memorial Stadium; Berkeley, CA		W 38–32	36,000	
November 11	7:15 pm	at Arizona	No. 10	Arizona Stadium; Tucson, AZ	FSN	W 33–9	44,109	
November 18	12:30 pm	No. 5 Oregon	No. 8	Reser Stadium; Corvallis, OR (Civil War)	ABC	W 23–13	36,044	
January 1, 2001	5:30 pm	vs. No. 10 Notre Dame*	No. 5	Sun Devil Stadium; Tempe, AZ (Fiesta Bowl)	ABC	W 41–9	75,428	
*Non-conference game; ^{†}Homecoming; Rankings from AP Poll released prior to the game; All times are in Pacific time

== Rankings ==
Ranking movements Legend: ██ Increase in ranking ██ Decrease in ranking — = Not ranked
	Week																
Poll	Pre	1	2	3	4	5	6	7	8	9	10	11	12	13	14	15	Final
AP	—	—	—	—	—	—	23	23	19	18	14	10	8	5	5	5	4
Coaches	—	—	—	—	—	—	23	20	18	17	14	10	8	6	6	6	5
BCS	Not released									—	11	9	9	5	6	6	Not released

== Game summaries ==
=== Eastern Washington ===
Eagles (0-0) at Beavers (0-0)

Team	1	2	3	4	Total
Eastern Washington	0	3	9	7	19
• Oregon State	0	7	7	7	21

- Date: September 2
- Location: Reser Stadium, Corvallis, OR
- Game attendance: 30,782
- Source: Box Score

Scoring summary
2	7:08	EWASH	Troy Griggs 44-yard field goal	EWASH 3-0
2	4:23	OSU	Ken Simonton 3-yard run (Ryan Cesca kick)	OSU 7-3
3	9:49	EWASH	Troy Griggs 22-yard field goal	OSU 7-6
3	5:40	OSU	Simonton 14-yard run (Cesca kick)	OSU 14-6
3	3:48	EWASH	Jesse Chatman 2-yard run (two-point attempt failed)	OSU 14-12
4	4:26	OSU	Simonton 14-yard run (Cesca kick)	OSU 21-12
4	3:16	EWASH	Fred Salanoa 7-yard run (Griggs kick)	OSU 21-19

=== USC ===
Trojans (3-0) at Beavers (3-0)

Team	1	2	3	4	Total
USC	7	7	0	7	21
• Oregon State	14	0	0	17	31

- Date: September 30
- Location: Reser Stadium, Corvallis, OR
- Game attendance: 33,775
- Source: Box Score

=== At Washington ===
Beavers (4-0) at Huskies (3-1)

Team	1	2	3	4	Total
Oregon State	14	0	7	9	30
• Washington	7	13	0	13	33

- Date: October 7
- Location: Husky Stadium, Seattle, WA
- Game attendance: 73,145
- TV announcers (FSN): Steve Physioc (Play-by-play),
  Tom Ramsey (Color) & Lisa Malosky (Sideline)
- Source: Box Score

Scoring summary
1	5:29	OSU	Robert Prescott 48-yard pass from Jonathan Smith (Ryan Cesca kick)	OSU 7–0
1	2:23	WASH	Justin Robbins 16-yard pass from Marques Tuiasosopo (John Anderson kick)	Tied 7–7
1	0:18	OSU	Patrick McCall 43-yard run (Cesca kick)	OSU 14–7
2	11:27	WASH	Rich Alexis 1-yard run (Anderson kick)	Tied 14-14
2	5:33	WASH	John Anderson 27-yard field goal	Wash 17-14
2	0:00	WASH	John Anderson 23-yard field goal	Wash 20-14
3	4:29	OSU	T.J. Houshmandzadeh 11-yard pass from Jonathan Smith (Cesca kick)	OSU 21-20
4	14:01	WASH	Rich Alexis 1-yard run (two point attempt failed)	Wash 26-21
4	14:01	OSU	Keith Heyward-Johnson 98-yard fumble return of two-point conversion attempt	Wash 26-23
4	8:23	WASH	Marques Tuiasosopo 4-yard run (Anderson kick)	Wash 33-23
4	7:22	OSU	Chad Johnson 80-yard pass from Jonathan Smith (Cesca kick)	Wash 33-30

=== Oregon ===
Ducks (9-1) at Beavers (9-1)
Civil War

Team	1	2	3	4	Total
Oregon	0	7	0	6	13
• Oregon State	14	3	6	0	23

- Date: November 18
- Location: Reser Stadium, Corvallis, OR
- Game attendance: 36,044
- TV announcers (ABC): Keith Jackson (Play-by-play),
  Tim Brant (Color), & Todd Harris (Sideline)
- Source: Box Score

=== Vs. Notre Dame (Fiesta Bowl) ===
Fighting Irish (9-2) vs. Beavers (10-1)

Team	1	2	3	4	Total
Notre Dame	0	3	0	6	9
• Oregon State	3	9	29	0	41

- Date: January 1, 2001
- Location: Sun Devil Stadium, Tempe, AZ
- Game attendance: 75,428
- TV announcers (ABC): Sean McDonough (Play-by-play),
  Ed Cunningham (Color), & Leslie Gudel (Sideline)
- Source: Box Score

== Roster ==
2000 Oregon State Beavers football team roster
Players
Coaches
Offense

Pos.	#	Name	Class
RB	33	Antonio Battle	Sr
TE	84	Tim Euhus	Fr
OL	60	Chris Gibson	Jr
WR	18	T. J. Houshmandzadeh	Sr
OL	61	Dustin Janz	Jr
TE	89	Bennie Johnson	Sr
WR	80	Chad Johnson	Sr
OT	70	Mike Kuykendall	So
TE	87	Marty Maurer	Sr
RB	8	Patrick McCall	Jr
WR	2	James Newson	So
WR	82	Robert Prescott	Sr
TE	85	Tyler Ross	So
OL	74	Vince Sandoval	Jr
RB	35	Ken Simonton	Jr
QB	9	Jonathan Smith	Jr
OL	72	Robert Sykes	Sr
TE	19	Seth Trimmer	So

Defense

Pos.	#	Name	Class
LB	34	James Allen	Jr
LB	42	Nick Barnett	So
CB	32	Calvin Carlyle	Jr
CB	44	Terrence Carroll	Sr
S	31	Jake Cookus	Jr
DT	98	Dwan Edwards	Fr
DE	1	DeLawrence Grant	Sr
CB	7	Terrance Gray	Sr
S	3	Keith Heyward-Johnson	Sr
DE	95	LaDairis Jackson	Sr
DT	93	David Lose	Fr
DT	99	Eric Manning	So
S	37	Mitch Meeuwsen	Fr
LB	2	Tevita Moala	Sr
CB	12	Eric Mobley	Jr
DT	71	Charles O'Neal	Sr
DE	45	Sefa O'Reilly	Sr
CB	23	Terrell Roberts	So
LB	5	Darnell Robinson	Sr
LB	51	Richard Siegler	Fr
DT	96	Daniel Torres	Jr
CB	4	Ricky Walker	Sr
CB	21	Dennis Weathersby	So
CB	36	Aric Williams	Fr

Special teams

Pos.	#	Name	Class
PK	41	Ryan Cesca	So
P	25	Mike Fessler	Sr

Head coach

- Dennis Erickson (2nd year)

Coordinators/assistant coaches

- Gregg Smith (AHC, OL)
- Tim Lappano (OC)
- Craig Bray (DC)
- Eric Yarber (WR)
- Dan Cozzetto (RB)
- Jim Michalczik (TE, ST)

Legend

- (C) Team captain
- (S) Suspended
- (I) Ineligible
- Injured
- Redshirt

Roster

== Team players in the 2001 NFL draft ==
Player	Position	Round	Pick	NFL club
Chad Johnson	Wide receiver	2	36	Cincinnati Bengals
DeLawrence Grant	Defensive end	3	89	Oakland Raiders
Mitch White	Tackle	6	185	New Orleans Saints
T. J. Houshmandzadeh	Wide receiver	7	204	Cincinnati Bengals
