= Rick Neuheisel =

American football analyst, coach, player, and attorney (born 1961)

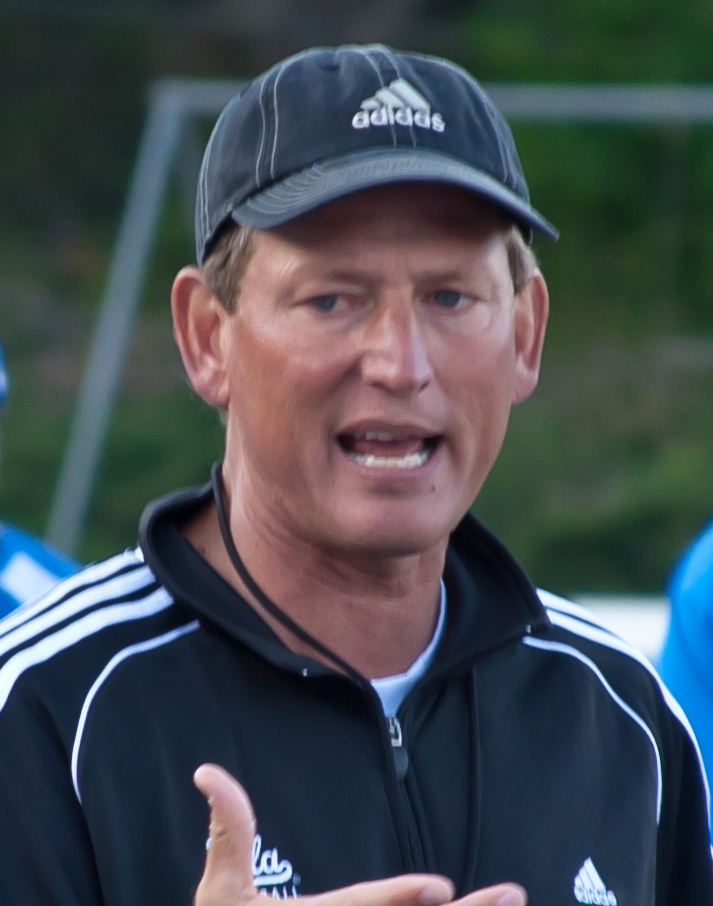
- Neuheisel at the UCLA spring scrimmage in 2011

Colorado Stampede
- Title: Head coach

Personal information
- Born: February 7, 1961 (age 65); Madison, Wisconsin, U.S.

Career information
- Position: Quarterback (No. 7)
- College: UCLA (1979–1983)
- NFL draft: 1984: undrafted

Career history

Playing
- San Antonio Gunslingers (1984–1985); San Diego Chargers (1987); Tampa Bay Buccaneers (1987)

Coaching
- UCLA (1986) Graduate assistant; UCLA (1988–1989) Quarterbacks coach; UCLA (1990–1993) Wide receivers coach; Colorado (1994) QB/Receivers Coach; Colorado (1995–1998) Head coach; Washington (1999–2002) Head coach; Baltimore Ravens (2005–2006) Quarterbacks coach; Baltimore Ravens (2007) Offensive coordinator; UCLA (2008–2011) Head coach; Arizona Hotshots (2019) Head coach; Dallas Renegades (2026) Head coach; Colorado Stampede (2027–present) Head coach

Awards and highlights
- Coaching: Pac-10 champion (2000); Pac-12 South Division champion (2011)

Head coaching record
- Regular season: NCAA: 82–55 (.599); UFL: 4–6 (.400); AAF: 5–3 (.625)
- Postseason: NCAA: 5–4 (.556); UFL: 0–0 (–); AAF: 0–0 (–)
- Career: NCAA: 87–59 (.596); UFL: 4–6 (.400); AAF: 5–3 (.625)
- Stats at Pro Football Reference

Richard Gerald Neuheisel Jr. (/ˈnuːhaɪzəl/; born February 7, 1961) is an American football analyst, coach, and former player who currently serves as the head coach for the Colorado Stampede of the United Football League (UFL). He served as the head football coach at the University of Colorado Boulder from 1995 to 1999, at the University of Washington from 1999 to 2002, and at his alma mater, the University of California, Los Angeles (UCLA), from 2008 to 2011, compiling a career college football coaching record of 87–59. From 2005 to 2007, Neuheisel was an assistant coach with the Baltimore Ravens of the National Football League (NFL), as quarterbacks coach for two seasons and offensive coordinator for one. He formerly served as head coach for the Arizona Hotshots of the Alliance of American Football (AAF) before the collapse of the league. Before coaching, Neuheisel played quarterback for the UCLA Bruins from 1980 to 1983, then spent two seasons with the San Antonio Gunslingers of the United States Football League (USFL) before splitting the 1987 NFL season between the San Diego Chargers and the Tampa Bay Buccaneers.

== Early life ==
Neuheisel was born in Madison, Wisconsin, one of four children and the only son of Dick and Jane (Jackson) Neuheisel, with sisters Nancy, Katie, and Deborah. Dick is an attorney and Rick grew up in Tempe, Arizona, and graduated from McClintock High School in 1979. He lettered in three sports (football, basketball, baseball) and was named its outstanding athlete during his senior year.

== Playing career ==
=== Collegiate ===
Neuheisel played his college football at UCLA, beginning his career as a walk-on and holding placekicks for John Lee. He was the starting quarterback in his senior year in the 1983 season. UCLA opened with a loss at Georgia, a tie with Arizona State and then a 42–10 loss at #1-ranked Nebraska. Neuheisel was benched after the Nebraska loss in favor of Steve Bono. On October 1, the Bruins lost to BYU to start the season 0–3–1. Bono was injured during the Stanford game, and Neuheisel came back to finish the season. Neuheisel led the Bruins to an eventual 6–4–1 record, culminating with a win over arch-rival USC that, combined with Washington State's upset of Washington, gave UCLA the Pac-10 championship in 1983 and sent them to the Rose Bowl on January 2, 1984.

Neuheisel led the Bruins to a 45–9 victory over 4th-ranked and heavily favored Illinois in the 1984 Rose Bowl, in which he was named the MVP; two of his four touchdown passes were caught by a sophomore wide receiver from San Diego named Karl Dorrell, a future Neuheisel assistant coach and later his predecessor as the UCLA head coach. The victory vaulted the Bruins, unranked through most of the season, into the top 20 in wire service polls. Much like his rise to stardom at UCLA, the road to the victory was a bumpy one. Neuheisel and two other players on the defensive side of the ball suffered from food poisoning hours before the Rose Bowl and it was unsure that Neuheisel would start. Neuheisel would end up starting the game. He also set an NCAA record that year for single game pass completion percentage (since broken) by completing 25 of 27 passes (92.6%) in a Pac-10 win over Washington. In 1998, Neuheisel was inducted into the Rose Bowl Hall of Fame.

Neuheisel was named to the Pac-10 All-Academic team and graduated from UCLA in May 1984 with a B.A. in political science and a 3.4 GPA. Neuheisel still holds the UCLA single season record for completion percentage, completing 185 of 267 passes (69.3%) for 2,245 yards in the 1983 season. He was also a member of Sigma Nu fraternity while a student.

=== Professional ===
Neuheisel was bypassed in the 1984 NFL draft and joined the San Antonio Gunslingers of the USFL, where he played the 1984 and 1985 seasons as the Gunslingers' starter. Never considered a major NFL prospect, he went undrafted in the NFL's supplemental draft of USFL players and his career in that league was extremely brief, lasting only five weeks. In the 1987 season, Neuheisel signed with the San Diego Chargers as a replacement player during the three-game long players' strike. He spent the last two weeks of that season as a backup with the Tampa Bay Buccaneers, not playing in either game.

== Coaching career ==
=== Early years as assistant ===
While attending USC Law School on an NCAA postgraduate scholarship, Neuheisel served as a graduate assistant with UCLA, where he tutored Troy Aikman. He graduated with a Juris Doctor (J.D.) from USC in 1990 and passed the Arizona State Bar in May 1991 and the Washington, D.C. Bar in March 1993.

He later became a full-time assistant coach in 1988, and stayed at UCLA through the 1993 season. Hard feelings emerged with UCLA coach Terry Donahue in 1994, when Donahue picked Texas A&M assistant Bob Toledo to be the Bruins' offensive coordinator over Neuheisel. In 1994, Neuheisel moved to Colorado as an assistant to Bill McCartney. Neuheisel and Donahue had a chance meeting at the airport in Dallas in 1999, and resolved their differences.

=== Colorado (1995–1998) ===
McCartney retired following the 1994 season and Neuheisel, age 34, was named the head coach. He stayed for four seasons (1995–1998) in Boulder as the Buffs coach. His best season was his first, in which the Buffs tied for second in the final season of Big Eight Conference play and won the Cotton Bowl. His only losing season at Colorado was 1997; the Buffs were expected to be national title contenders, but never recovered from a blowout loss to Michigan on national television. After the season, the Buffs were forced to forfeit their five wins due to an ineligible player, though Neuheisel was subsequently ruled to not be affected.

=== Washington (1999–2002) ===
Neuheisel was welcomed into the Rose Bowl Hall of Fame before the 1999 Rose Bowl. University of Washington athletic director Barbara Hedges took the opportunity to meet with him. She fired coach Jim Lambright and named Neuheisel as his replacement. Neuheisel left for Seattle in January 1999 to coach at the University of Washington for four seasons (1999–2002). His starting salary was $1,000,000 annually, at the time one of the five highest in the nation. One of Neuheisel's first acts was to restore the Huskies' traditional gold helmets; they had worn purple helmets for the previous four seasons.

In the 2000 season, the Huskies won the Pac-10 title and the Rose Bowl over Big Ten champ Purdue, led by quarterback Drew Brees. Their only loss was to the rival Oregon Ducks. Washington, led by senior quarterback Marques Tuiasosopo, the Rose Bowl MVP, finished the season at 11–1 and was ranked third in the final national polls. Neuheisel became the first (and as of 2016 only) former Rose Bowl MVP to coach a winning Rose Bowl team.

In 2008, The Seattle Times ran a series of articles which accused Neuheisel and athletic director Barbara Hedges of overlooking numerous discipline problems—including outright criminal behavior—during the 2000 season. During that year, UW safety Curtis Williams was allowed to play despite being issued an outstanding arrest warrant for assaulting his wife, Michelle. Linebacker Jeremiah Pharms was under investigation for robbing and shooting a drug dealer after police found his fingerprints at the scene, but was not charged until the season was over. Jerramy Stevens, the Huskies star tight end, was under investigation of raping a UW freshman on sorority row. When Stevens later crashed his truck into a retirement home, Neuheisel suspended him for half a game.

In August 2002, Neuheisel signed a six-year contract extension, through the 2008 season. In February 2003, he secretly interviewed for the San Francisco 49ers coaching job without telling anyone at UW about it. The 49ers' general manager was Terry Donahue, who had been Neuheisel's head coach as a player and assistant coach at UCLA. A day after his interview, he issued a statement through UW's athletic department saying he wasn't interested in the job. However, a few days later, a Seattle newspaper reporter wrote that he'd eavesdropped on a private conversation of Neuheisel discussing the 49ers job on his cell phone while the two were waiting for a flight at San Francisco International Airport. When Hedges found out about it, she and school president Lee Huntsman warned him that further lies would not be tolerated.

==== NCAA infractions at Washington ====
Before Neuheisel coached his first game for the Huskies, he had already violated NCAA recruiting rules by visiting high school players before the NCAA approved date to do so. In the summer of 2003, Neuheisel came under fire for taking part in a neighborhood pool for the 2003 NCAA Division I men's basketball tournament and lies he told about his actions. He first denied the accusation to investigators before admitting to it after consultation with school officials. The gambling case became a local sensation when it was revealed that he had received an internal UW memo which authorized gambling in off-campus tournament basketball pools. UW athletic director Barbara Hedges learned that the NCAA was considering giving Neuheisel a two-year show-cause order, which would have effectively blacklisted him from the coaching ranks for two years. She then gave Neuheisel an ultimatum—resign or be fired for cause. He refused, and was fired on June 11.

That fall, the NCAA infractions committee found Neuheisel violated NCAA rules against gambling but didn't sanction him, citing the memo by Washington's then compliance officer, Dana Richardson, that mistakenly identified this type of action as a permissible exception to NCAA gambling sanctions. It also became apparent that the NCAA violated its own rules when questioning Neuheisel about the gambling. UW had its probation extended for failing to monitor its football program.

Neuheisel sued both the NCAA and the University of Washington concerning the termination of his employment contract. Toward the end of trial, it was revealed that the NCAA had failed to turn over certain crucial evidence to Neuheisel's attorneys. The new evidence (updated NCAA bylaws pertaining to rules investigations) bolstered Neuheisel's claim that the NCAA acted improperly during its investigation that eventually led to his firing. With the new evidence revealed, the NCAA and University of Washington requested to settle before the case went to the jury. The settlement awarded Neuheisel $4.5 million, consisting of cash payments and some loan forgiveness. He served as a volunteer coach for Rainier Beach High School in Seattle for two seasons (2003–2004).

=== Baltimore Ravens assistant (2005–2007) ===
Neuheisel became an assistant coach (quarterbacks) with the NFL's Baltimore Ravens in January 2005. In 2006, the Ravens acquired quarterback Steve McNair and won the AFC North division with a 13–3 record. After the season, Neuheisel was promoted to offensive coordinator.

=== UCLA (2008–2011) ===
Neuheisel was invited to two interviews regarding the head coaching position at his alma mater UCLA, following the firing of his former UCLA teammate, Karl Dorrell. Ravens head coach Brian Billick assured that he would allow Neuheisel to leave the team before the completion of the 2007 NFL season. Other candidates in which UCLA showed interest and interviewed included: Oregon Ducks Coach Mike Bellotti, Temple Owls Coach Al Golden, Tennessee Titans offensive coordinator Norm Chow, UCLA's defensive coordinator and interim coach DeWayne Walker, and then-Philadelphia Eagles assistant John Harbaugh.

On December 29, 2007, Neuheisel was introduced as the head coach of the UCLA Bruins in a five-year contract that paid him $1.25 million per season and included incentives that could add $500,000 a year. He immediately began to consolidate his coaching staff by retaining DeWayne Walker, Karl Dorrell's defensive coordinator and interim coach for the Bruins 2007 bowl game. He made a major move by hiring Norm Chow, offensive coordinator of the Tennessee Titans and previously the offensive coordinator of crosstown rival USC's 2003 and 2004 national championship seasons. He also began to make himself highly visible to the media, including appearing at the 2008 Rose Bowl and coining the phrase "Passion Bucket" during an interview on The Dan Patrick Show by saying, "When you're at UCLA, you have to have your passion bucket full when you play the Trojans." He also appeared in an ad created by the UCLA athletics marketing department that declared, "The Football Monopoly in L.A. Is Officially Over" and engineered an agreement with Pete Carroll that allows both UCLA and USC to wear their home jerseys during the annual game. This home jersey arrangement begat a rule change for the 2009 football season.

Neuheisel had his first win on September 1 with the Bruins as they defeated #18 Tennessee, 27–24. The win came in overtime as Tennessee's field goal try sailed wide left. However, the team's momentum came to a halt in successive weeks. A brutal 59–0 defeat on the road at the hands of #15 BYU was followed by a disappointing 31–10 loss at home to unranked Arizona in the Bruins' Pac-10 opener. The UCLA offense failed to score a touchdown in either contest. The team finished the season 4–8 overall and 3–6 in conference.

Despite this record, Neuheisel was still able secure the fifth-best recruiting class in the nation in 2009 as rated by Scout.com. The class was headlined by two former USC commits, Morrell Presley and Randall Carroll, offensive linemen Xavier Sua-Filo and Stan Hasiak, and running back Damien Thigpen. Nevertheless, the Bruins fell to 4–8 in 2010, losing six of their last seven games and failing to receive a bowl berth. Player injuries and other attrition depleted UCLA of its roster depth, while true freshmen were forced into action and seniors who were previously reserves became starters; a quarterback who had attempted only 17 passes in his career became the starter. At the end of the season Neuheisel fired two assistant coaches, including Chow, and said he would "be crushed ... if we're not going to a bowl game a year from now."

The 2011 season record improved to 6–6 in regular season play. The Bruins won the first Pac-12 South Division title, as crosstown rival USC was ineligible due to NCAA sanctions. A shocking 50–0 shutout loss to USC to end the regular season—UCLA's fifth consecutive loss to the Trojans—prompted speculation that Neuheisel would be fired.

Neuheisel was fired as head coach of UCLA on November 28, 2011. He was allowed to coach his final game, the Pac-12 Championship Game on December 2, where the team lost by a score of 49–31 to the Oregon Ducks.

=== Alliance of American Football (2019) ===
In May 2018, Neuheisel was announced as head coach for the Arizona Hotshots, a Phoenix-based team for the planned Alliance of American Football. The team played at Sun Devil Stadium in Neuheisel's home state of Arizona. Neuheisel led the team to a 5–3 record before the league folded in the middle of its inaugural season.

=== UFL (2026–present) ===
In 2025, he was announced as the head coach of the Dallas Renegades of the UFL for the 2026 season.

In 2026, he was revealed as the inaugural head coach for the Colorado Stampede.

== Broadcasting career ==
In December 2011, Neuheisel joined the CBS Sports Network as a guest analyst for their "Inside College Football" show.

In May 2012, the Pac-12 Network announced that he would be joining their networks as a studio analyst and a football game analyst starting with the 2012 football season.

Since June 2012 Neuheisel has hosted multiple shows on SiriusXM College Sports Radio Channel 91 including Full Ride with Chris Childers, and joins NFL Radio Channel 88 for the NFL Draft broadcast each year.

In March 2015, Neuheisel was hired by CBS Sports to be an analyst on College Football Today, the pre-game show for the SEC on CBS.

== Personal life ==
Neuheisel and his wife, Susan (née Wilkinson), have three sons: Jerry (b. 1992), Jack (b. 1994), and Joe (b. 1997). Jerry was a quarterback at UCLA and served as their interim offensive coordinator in 2025. He now serves as the quarterbacks coach at Northwestern. Jack was a wide receiver at Southern Methodist University. Both Jerry and Jack graduated from Loyola High School in Los Angeles, Joe also attended UCLA. Rick's father, Richard "Dick" Gerald Neuheisel Sr., was an attorney and past president of Sister Cities International. During Neuheisel's years as a quarterback for UCLA, his sister, Nancy, was a cheerleader for conference rival Arizona.

== Head coaching record ==
=== NCAA ===
Year	Team	Overall	Conference	Standing	Bowl/playoffs	Coaches^{#}	AP^{°}
Colorado Buffaloes (Big Eight Conference) (1995)
1995	Colorado	10–2	5–2	T–2nd	W Cotton	4	5
Colorado Buffaloes (Big 12 Conference) (1996–1998)
1996	Colorado	10–2	7–1	2nd (North)	W Holiday	8	8
1997	Colorado	5–6 (Note: Colorado forfeited all wins of the 1997 season due to an ineligible player, but Neuheisel was ruled not to be affected.)	3–5	T–4th (North)			
1998	Colorado	8–4	4–4	4th (North)	W Aloha		
Colorado:		33–14	19–12				
Washington Huskies (Pacific-10 Conference) (1999–2002)
1999	Washington	7–5	6–2	2nd	L Holiday		
2000	Washington	11–1	7–1	T–1st	W Rose^{†}	3	3
2001	Washington	8–4	6–2	T–2nd	L Holiday	19	19
2002	Washington	7–6	4–4	T–4th	L Sun		
Washington:		33–16	23–9				
UCLA Bruins (Pacific-10/Pac-12 Conference) (2008–2011)
2008	UCLA	4–8	3–6	8th			
2009	UCLA	7–6	3–6	8th	W EagleBank		
2010	UCLA	4–8	2–7	9th			
2011	UCLA	6–7 (Note: Neuheisel was fired after the Pac-12 Championship Game. Offensive coordinator Mike Johnson was appointed as interim head coach and coached the team in the Kraft Fight Hunger Bowl.)	5–4	1st (South) (Note: UCLA represented the South Division in the 2011 Pac-12 Football Championship Game. USC finished first place in the South Division, but was ineligible to participate in the Championship Game due to NCAA sanctions.)	L Fight Hunger		
UCLA:		21–29	13–23				
Total:		87–59					
National championship Conference title Conference division title or championship game berth
^{†}Indicates BCS bowl.; ^{#}Rankings from final Coaches Poll.; ^{°}Rankings from final AP Poll.

=== AAF ===
Team	Year	Regular season					Postseason			
Team	Year	Won	Lost	Ties	Win %	Finish	Won	Lost	Win %	Result
ARI	2019	5	3	0	.625					

=== UFL ===
Team	Year	Regular season					Postseason			
Team	Year	Won	Lost	Ties	Win %	Finish	Won	Lost	Win %	Result
DAL	2026	4	6	0	.400	5th	—	—	—	—
Total		4	6	0	.400		0	0	–	

== Bibliography ==
- Baker, Chris – Neuheisel Proves to Be Poison to Illinois. Four Scoring Passes Are a Tough Act for Illini to Stomach. Los Angeles Times, January 3, 1984. Quote:"UCLA quarterback Rick Neuheisel had trouble sleeping before Monday's Rose Bowl game, but it wasn't because he was having nightmares about facing Illinois' defense."
- Barnhart, Jim – 1984: Illini no match for Neuheisel, UCLA, Bloomington-Normal, Illinois Pantagraph (Pantagraph.com), December 15, 2007
- Dodds, Tracy – Ailing Quarterback Leads UCLA to 45-9 Win in Rose Bowl. Los Angeles Times, January 3, 1984
- Hurst, Matt – Illinois' 1984 Rose Bowl loss is one the team would like to forget Archived December 11, 2008, at the Wayback Machine. The (Riverside) Press-Enterprise, December 26, 2007
- Los Angeles Times Staff – Caltech at It Again. Credit Beavers for Sabotaging Rose Bowl Scoreboard. Los Angeles Times, January 3, 1984. Quote:"In the fourth quarter, UCLA was leading Illinois, 38-9, but the scoreboard read: Caltech 38, MIT 9."
- Los Angeles Times Staff – Favorites Bowled Over. Neuheisel Leads Bruins to Glory; Nebraska Loses. Los Angeles Times, January 3, 1984. Quote:"In a day of bowl game upsets, UCLA swamped Illinois, 45-9, No. 2-ranked Texas was defeated, 10-9, by Georgia and previously unbeaten Nebraska, rated No. 1 in all polls, was surprised by Miami, 31-30."
- Timmerman, Bob – The Rose Bowl and me: Part two: January 2, 1984 – UCLA vs. Illinois. Baseball Toaster (Griddle), December 27, 2006
- UCLA Bruins Football Media Guide (PDF copy available at www.uclabruins.com)
