= 2000 Washington Huskies football team =

American college football season

2000 Washington Huskies football

Pac-10 co-champion Rose Bowl champion

Rose Bowl, W 34–24 vs. Purdue
- Conference: Pacific-10 Conference

Ranking
- Coaches: No. 3
- AP: No. 3
- Record: 11–1 (7–1 Pac-10)
- Head coach: Rick Neuheisel (2nd season)
- Offensive coordinator: Keith Gilbertson (2nd season)
- Offensive scheme: Spread
- Defensive coordinator: Tim Hundley (2nd season)
- Base defense: Multiple
- Captains: Larry Tripplett; Marques Tuiasosopo; Chad Ward
- Home stadium: Husky Stadium

2000 Pacific-10 Conference football standings
	Conf.			Overall
Team	W		L	W		L
No. 4 Oregon State %+	7	–	1	11	–	1
No. 3 Washington $+	7	–	1	11	–	1
No. 7 Oregon +	7	–	1	10	–	2
Stanford	4	–	4	5	–	6
UCLA	3	–	5	6	–	6
Arizona State	3	–	5	6	–	6
Arizona	3	–	5	5	–	6
USC	2	–	6	5	–	7
Washington State	2	–	6	4	–	7
California	2	–	6	3	–	8
$ – BCS representative as conference champion; % – BCS at-large representative; + – Conference co-champions; Rankings from AP Poll

The 2000 Washington Huskies football team represented the University of Washington in the 2000 NCAA Division I-A football season. The Huskies were led by second-year head coach Rick Neuheisel and played their home games on campus in Seattle at Husky Stadium. Washington lost only once, on the road at Oregon, and won the Rose Bowl on New Year's Day to finish with an 11–1 record.

On the new FieldTurf at Husky Stadium, Washington opened the 2000 season on September2 with a 44–20 victory over Idaho. Fourth-ranked Miami traveled to Seattle the next week and senior QB Marques Tuiasosopo threw for 223 yards and ran for 45 as the Huskies handed the Hurricanes their only loss of the season, 34–29.

The following week, Neuheisel led UW against his former team, the Colorado Buffaloes, at Folsom Field in Boulder. The Huskies celebrated their coach's homecoming with a 17–14 victory. Border rival Oregon spoiled Washington's hopes for a perfect season with a 23–16 setback in the wind in Eugene, but the Huskies responded the next week with a dramatic 33–30 victory over eventual Fiesta Bowl champion Oregon State in the only loss of their season.

In the next five weeks, the Huskies battled back from second half deficits in every game, including a 31–28 win in the rain at Stanford that was marked with tragedy; safety Curtis Williams (1978–2002) was paralyzed after a neck injury late in the third quarter. For the remainder of the season, players and coaches wore the letters "CW" on helmets and uniforms in honor of him; he died from complications less than 19 months later.

After several second half comebacks, Washington was finally able to win a game easily with a 51–3 victory over Washington State in the Apple Cup in Pullman, setting a record for largest margin of victory (48 points) in the series. (The 1990 team led by 52 points, also in Pullman, but reserves allowed a late touchdown.) The win over the Cougars, paired with an Oregon State win over Oregon in the Civil War, put the Huskies in the Rose Bowl, taking the tiebreaker with the better non-conference record.

On New Year's Day in Pasadena, Tuiasosopo earned Rose Bowl MVP honors as he led fourth-ranked Washington to a 34–24 win over No. 14 Purdue and Drew Brees; the Huskies were third in both final polls.

== Schedule ==
Date	Time	Opponent	Rank	Site	TV	Result	Attendance	Source
September 2	12:30 p.m.	Idaho*	No. 14	Husky Stadium; Seattle, WA	FSN	W 44–20	70,117	
September 9	12:30 p.m.	No. 4 Miami (FL)*	No. 15	Husky Stadium; Seattle, WA	ABC	W 34–29	74,157	
September 16	12:30 p.m.	at Colorado*	No. 9	Folsom Field; Boulder, CO	ABC	W 17–14	50,454	
September 30	12:30 p.m.	at No. 20 Oregon	No. 6	Autzen Stadium; Eugene, OR (rivalry)	ABC	L 16–23	46,153	
October 7	7:00 p.m.	No. 23 Oregon State	No. 13	Husky Stadium; Seattle, WA	FSN	W 33–30	73,145	
October 14	7:00 p.m.	at Arizona State	No. 11	Sun Devil Stadium; Tempe, AZ	FSN	W 21–15	61,370	
October 21	3:30 p.m.	California	No. 9	Husky Stadium; Seattle, WA	FSN	W 36–24	70,113	
October 28	2:00 p.m.	at Stanford	No. 9	Stanford Stadium; Stanford, CA	FSN	W 31–28	31,300	
November 4	12:30 p.m.	Arizona	No. 8	Husky Stadium; Seattle, WA	ABC	W 35–32	70,411	
November 11	12:30 p.m.	UCLA	No. 7	Husky Stadium; Seattle, WA	ABC	W 35–28	71,886	
November 18	3:30 p.m.	at Washington State	No. 6	Martin Stadium; Pullman, WA (Apple Cup)	FSN	W 51–3	33,010	
January 1, 2001	1:30 p.m.	vs. No. 14 Purdue*	No. 4	Rose Bowl; Pasadena, CA (Rose Bowl)	ABC	W 34–24	94,392	
*Non-conference game; Rankings from AP Poll released prior to the game; All times are in Pacific time

== Rankings ==
Ranking movements Legend: ██ Increase in ranking ██ Decrease in ranking
	Week																
Poll	Pre	1	2	3	4	5	6	7	8	9	10	11	12	13	14	15	Final
AP	13	14	15	9	8	6	13	11	9	9	8	7	6	4	4	4	3
Coaches	14	15	15	10	7	6	11	10	9	9	7	6	5	4	4	4	3
BCS	Not released									9	8	6	5	4	4	4	Not released

== Game summaries ==
=== Miami (FL) ===
#4 Miami (FL) at #15 Washington

Team	1	2	3	4	Total
Miami (FL)	3	0	19	7	29
• Washington	7	14	6	7	34

- Date: September 9
- Location: Husky Stadium • Seattle, Washington
- Game attendance: 74,157
- Referee: Chuck McFerrin

Scoring summary
1	8:19	WASH	Braxton Cleman 3-yard run (John Anderson kick)	Washington 7-0
1	2:25	MIA	Todd Sievers 27-yard field goal	Washington 7-3
2	5:19	WASH	Marques Tuiasosopo 12-yard run (John Anderson kick)	Washington 14-3
2	2:02	WASH	Jeremy Stevens 23-yard pass from Marques Tuiasosopo (John Anderson kick)	Washington 21-3
3	7:34	MIA	Reggie Wayne 21-yard pass from Ken Dorsey (two-point conversion failed)	Washington 21-9
3	6:10	WASH	Rich Alexis 50-yard run (two-point conversion failed)	Washington 27-9
3	5:23	MIA	Najeh Davenport 8-yard run (two-point conversion failed)	Washington 27-15
3	3:50	MIA	James Jackson 8-yard run (Todd Sievers kick)	Washington 27-22
4	14:30	WASH	Pat Condiff 1-yard run (John Anderson kick)	Washington 34-22
4	2:52	MIA	James Jackson 1-yard run (Todd Sievers kick)	Washington 34-29

=== Oregon State ===
Beavers (4-0) at Huskies (3-1)

Team	1	2	3	4	Total
Oregon State	14	0	7	9	30
• Washington	7	13	0	13	33

- Date: October 7, 2000
- Location: Husky Stadium, Seattle, WA
- Game attendance: 73,145
- TV announcers (FSN): Steve Physioc (Play-by-play), Tom Ramsey (Color) & Lisa Malosky (Sideline)
- Source: Box Score

Scoring summary
1	5:29	OSU	Robert Prescott 48-yard pass from Jonathan Smith (Ryan Cesca kick)	OSU 7–0
1	2:23	WASH	Justin Robbins 16-yard pass from Marques Tuiasosopo (John Anderson kick)	Tied 7–7
1	0:18	OSU	Patrick McCall 43-yard run (Cesca kick)	OSU 14–7
2	11:27	WASH	Rich Alexis 1-yard run (Anderson kick)	Tied 14-14
2	5:33	WASH	John Anderson 27-yard field goal	Wash 17-14
2	0:00	WASH	John Anderson 23-yard field goal	Wash 20-14
3	4:29	OSU	T.J. Houshmandzadeh 11-yard pass from Jonathan Smith (Cesca kick)	OSU 21-20
4	14:01	WASH	Rich Alexis 1-yard run (two point attempt failed)	Wash 26-21
4	14:01	OSU	Keith Heyward-Johnson 98-yard fumble return of two-point conversion attempt	Wash 26-23
4	8:23	WASH	Marques Tuiasosopo 4-yard run (Anderson kick)	Wash 33-23
4	7:22	OSU	Chad Johnson 80-yard pass from Jonathan Smith (Cesca kick)	Wash 33-30

=== Vs. Purdue (Rose Bowl) ===
Team	1	2	3	4	Total
Purdue	0	10	7	7	24
• Washington	14	0	6	14	34

- Date: January 1
- Location: Rose Bowl, Pasadena, CA
- Game attendance: 94,392
- Referee: Jack Childress
- TV announcers (ABC): Keith Jackson (Play-by-play), Tim Brant (Color) & Todd Harris (Sideline)

Scoring summary
1	8:33	WASH	Cleman 1-yard run (Anderson kick)	WASH 7–0
1	4:42	WASH	Tuiasosopo 5-yard run (Anderson kick)	WASH 14–0
2	11:32	PUR	Sutherland 5-yard pass from Brees (Dorsch kick)	WASH 14–7
2	0:26	PUR	Travis Dorsch 26-yard field goal	WASH 14–10
3	13:12	WASH	Anderson 47-yard field goal	WASH 17–10
3	11:58	PUR	Sutherland 24-yard pass from Brees (Dorsch kick)	Tied 17–17
3	6:55	WASH	Anderson 42-yard field goal	WASH 20–17
4	12:00	WASH	Elstrom 8-yard pass from Tuiasosopo (Anderson kick)	WASH 27–17
4	7:25	WASH	Hurst 8-yard run (Anderson kick)	WASH 34–17
4	6:37	PUR	Brown 42-yard run (Dorsch kick)	WASH 34–24

== Roster ==
2000 Washington Huskies football team roster
Players
Coaches
Offense

Pos.	#	Name	Class
RB	24	Rich Alexis	Fr
RB	20	Paul Arnold	So
C	64	Kyle Benn	Jr
OT	74	Wes Call	Sr
RB	29	Braxton Cleman	Jr
TE	97	Joe Collier	Jr
TE	85	John Westra	Jr
FB	47	Pat Conniff	Sr
WR	19	Wondame Davis	Jr
WR	18	Todd Elstrom	Jr
G	54	Matt Fraize	Sr
WR	9	Gerald Harris	Sr
RB	8	Willie Hurst	Jr
WR	89	Chris Juergens	Jr
G	55	Rock Nelson	Jr
QB	3	Cody Pickett	Fr
WR	5	Patrick Reddick	Jr
WR	80	Justin Robbins	Fr
G	77	Matt Rogers	Sr
QB	12	J.K. Scott	Jr
OT	68	Elliot Silvers	Sr
TE	14	Jerramy Stevens	So
QB	11	Marques Tuiasosopo (C)	Sr
FB	45	Ken Walker	Jr
G	71	Chad Ward (C)	Sr
TE	84	Kevin Ware	So

Defense

Pos.	#	Name	Class
SS	9	Hakim Akbar	Sr
DB	3	Roc Alexander	Fr
FS	43	Owen Biddle	So
CB	10	Toure Butler	Sr
FS	34	Greg Carothers	Fr
LB	24	Derrell Daniels	Sr
DE	46	Ossim Hatem	So
DB	21	Derrick Johnson	Fr
DT	76	Ryan Julian	Sr
LB	47	Anthony Kelley	Jr
LB	42	Tyler Krambrink	Fr
CB	12	Omare Lowe	Jr
LB	41	Ben Mahdavi	So
CB	28	Chris Massey	Fr
LB	4	Jeremiah Pharms	Sr
DE	97	Marcus Roberson	Jr
DE	59	Jerome Stevens	Fr
NT	70	Larry Tripplett (C)	Jr
CB	23	Anthony Vontoure	Jr
FS	25	Curtis Williams	Sr
LB	13	Jafar Williams	Jr
LB	6	Jamaun Willis	Jr

Special teams

Pos.	#	Name	Class
K	15	John Anderson	So
P	16	Ryan Fleming	Sr

Head coach

- Rick Neuheisel (2nd year)

Coordinators/assistant coaches

- Keith Gilbertson (OC, TE)
- Tim Hundley (DC, ILB)
- Steve Axman (AHC, QB, WR)
- Randy Hart (DL)
- Bobby Hauck (S, ST)
- Chuck Heater (CB)
- Wayne Moses (RB)
- Brent Myers (OL)
- Tom Williams (OLB)
- Ikaika Malloe (GA)

Legend

- (C) Team captain
- (S) Suspended
- (I) Ineligible
- Injured
- Redshirt

Roster
Last update: 2020-01-31

== Awards and honors ==
- Marques Tuiasosopo, Rose Bowl Player of the Game

== NFL draft selections ==
Player	Position	Round	Pick	NFL club
Marques Tuiasosopo	Quarterback	2	59	Oakland Raiders
Elliot Silvers	Tackle	5	132	San Diego Chargers
Jeremiah Pharms	Linebacker	5	134	Cleveland Browns
Hakim Akbar	Defensive back	5	163	New England Patriots
Chad Ward	Guard	6	170	Jacksonville Jaguars
