= 2000 UCLA Bruins football team =

American college football season

2000 UCLA Bruins football

Sun Bowl, L 20–21 vs. Wisconsin
- Conference: Pacific-10 Conference
- Record: 6–6 (3–5 Pac-10)
- Head coach: Bob Toledo (5th season)
- Offensive coordinator: Al Borges (5th season)
- Offensive scheme: Pro-style
- Defensive coordinator: Bob Field (16th season)
- Base defense: 4–3
- Home stadium: Rose Bowl

2000 Pacific-10 Conference football standings
	Conf.			Overall
Team	W		L	W		L
No. 4 Oregon State %+	7	–	1	11	–	1
No. 3 Washington $+	7	–	1	11	–	1
No. 7 Oregon +	7	–	1	10	–	2
Stanford	4	–	4	5	–	6
UCLA	3	–	5	6	–	6
Arizona State	3	–	5	6	–	6
Arizona	3	–	5	5	–	6
USC	2	–	6	5	–	7
Washington State	2	–	6	4	–	7
California	2	–	6	3	–	8
$ – BCS representative as conference champion; % – BCS at-large representative; + – Conference co-champions; Rankings from AP Poll

The 2000 UCLA Bruins football team represented the University of California, Los Angeles (UCLA) as a member of the Pacific-10 Conference (Pac-10) during the 2000 NCAA Division I-A football season. Led by fifth-year head coach Bob Toledo, the Bruins compiled an overall record of 6–6 with a mark of 3–5 in conference play, placing in a three-way tie for fifth in the Pac-10. UCLA was invited to the Sun Bowl, where the Bruins lost to Wisconsin. The team played home games at the Rose Bowl in Pasadena, California.

== Schedule ==
Date	Time	Opponent	Rank	Site	TV	Result	Attendance
September 2	12:30 pm	No. 3 Alabama*		Rose Bowl; Pasadena, CA	ABC	W 35–24	76,640
September 9	4:30 pm	Fresno State*	No. 16	Rose Bowl; Pasadena, CA	FSNW2	W 24–21	45,605
September 16	12:30 pm	No. 3 Michigan*	No. 14	Rose Bowl; Pasadena, CA	ABC	W 23–20	88,044
September 23	12:30 pm	at Oregon	No. 6	Autzen Stadium; Eugene, OR (College GameDay)	FSN	L 10–29	45,470
September 30	7:15 pm	Arizona State	No. 15	Rose Bowl; Pasadena, CA	FSN	W 38–31	68,113
October 14	12:30 pm	at California	No. 13	California Memorial Stadium; Berkeley, CA (rivalry)		L 38–46 ^{3OT}	53,000
October 21	3:30 pm	No. 19 Oregon State	No. 23	Rose Bowl; Pasadena, CA	FSNW2	L 38–44	48,293
October 28	4:00 pm	at No. 24 Arizona		Arizona Stadium; Tucson, AZ	ABC	W 27–24	45,540
November 4	3:30 pm	Stanford^{†}		Rose Bowl; Pasadena, CA (rivalry)	FSN	W 37–35	64,039
November 11	4:00 pm	at No. 7 Washington		Husky Stadium; Seattle, WA	ABC	L 28–35	71,886
November 18	3:30 pm	USC		Rose Bowl; Pasadena, CA (Victory Bell)	FSNW2	L 35–38	80,227
December 29	11:15 am	vs. Wisconsin*		Sun Bowl; El Paso, TX (Sun Bowl)	CBS	L 20–21	49,093
*Non-conference game; ^{†}Homecoming; Rankings from AP Poll released prior to the game; All times are in Pacific time

== Rankings ==
Ranking movements Legend: ██ Increase in ranking ██ Decrease in ranking — = Not ranked ( ) = First-place votes
	Week																
Poll	Pre	1	2	3	4	5	6	7	8	9	10	11	12	13	14	15	Final
AP	—	—	16 (1)	14	6 (1)	15	16	13	23	—	—	—	—	—	—	—	—
Coaches Poll	—	—	17	17	8	17	17	15	24	—	—	—	—	—	—	—	—
BCS	Not released									—	—	—	—	—	—	—	Not released

== Game summaries ==
=== Alabama ===
Team	1	2	3	4	Total
Alabama	7	10	7	0	24
• UCLA	14	7	14	0	35

- Date: September 2
- Location: Rose Bowl, Pasadena, CA
- Game attendance: 76,640
- TV announcers (ABC): Keith Jackson (play-by-play), Tim Brant (color) and Todd Harris (sideline)

Scoring summary
Q1	13:45	ALA	Freddie Milons 71 yard punt return (Neal Thomas kick)	ALA 7–0
Q1	4:39	UCLA	DeShaun Foster 2 yard run (Chris Griffith kick)	Tie 7–7
Q1	:52	UCLA	Brian Poli-Dixon 31 yard pass from Freddie Mitchell (Chris Griffith kick)	UCLA 14–7
Q2	8:39	UCLA	DeShaun Foster 1 yard run (Chris Griffith kick)	UCLA 21–7
Q2	5:35	ALA	Ahmad Galloway 1 yard run (Neal Thomas kick)	UCLA 21–14
Q2	:59	ALA	Neal Thomas 38 yard field goal	UCLA 21–17
Q3	8:26	ALA	Reggie Myles 91 yard interception return (Neal Thomas kick)	ALA 24–21
Q3	7:05	UCLA	Freddie Mitchell 46 yard pass from Ryan McCann (Chris Griffith kick)	UCLA 28–24
Q3	1:50	UCLA	DeShaun Foster 8 yard run (Chris Griffith kick)	UCLA 35–24

- DeShaun Foster 42 Att, 187 Yds

== Roster ==
2000 UCLA Bruins football team roster
Players
Coaches
Offense

Pos.	#	Name	Class
WR	11	Drew Bennett	Sr
TE	81	Bryan Fletcher	Jr
RB	26	DeShaun Foster	Jr
WR	3	Freddie Mitchell	Jr
QB	10	Cory Paus	So
TE	18	Mike Seidman	So
RB	32	Matt Stanley	Jr
RB	15	Ed Stansbury	So

Defense

Pos.	#	Name	Class
S	7	Marques Anderson	Jr
DE	43	Dave Ball	Fr
DE	49	Mat Ball	Fr
LB	11	Brandon Chillar	Fr
DT	99	Kenyon Coleman	So
DT	77	Rodney Leisle	Fr
CB	9	Ricky Manning	So
LB	47	Ryan Nece	Jr
DE	90	Adam Peters	Jr
LB	44	Marcus Reese	So
LB	8	Robert Thomas	Jr

Special teams

Pos.	#	Name	Class
LS	58	Jeff Grau	Jr

Head coach

- Bob Toledo

Coordinators/assistant coaches

Legend

- (C) Team captain
- (S) Suspended
- (I) Ineligible
- Injured
- Redshirt

Roster
Last update: 2001-02-21
