= 2000 USC Trojans football team =

American college football season

2000 USC Trojans football
- Conference: Pacific-10 Conference
- Record: 5–7 (2–6 Pac-10)
- Head coach: Paul Hackett (3rd season)
- Offensive coordinator: Hue Jackson (4th season)
- Offensive scheme: Pro-style
- Defensive coordinator: Bill Young (3rd season)
- Base defense: 4–3
- Captains: Ennis Davis; Eric Denmon; Zeke Moreno; Petros Papadakis
- Home stadium: Los Angeles Memorial Coliseum

2000 Pacific-10 Conference football standings
	Conf.			Overall
Team	W		L	W		L
No. 4 Oregon State %+	7	–	1	11	–	1
No. 3 Washington $+	7	–	1	11	–	1
No. 7 Oregon +	7	–	1	10	–	2
Stanford	4	–	4	5	–	6
UCLA	3	–	5	6	–	6
Arizona State	3	–	5	6	–	6
Arizona	3	–	5	5	–	6
USC	2	–	6	5	–	7
Washington State	2	–	6	4	–	7
California	2	–	6	3	–	8
$ – BCS representative as conference champion; % – BCS at-large representative; + – Conference co-champions; Rankings from AP Poll

The 2000 USC Trojans football team represented the University of Southern California (USC) as a member of Pacific-10 Conference (Pac-10) during the 2000 NCAA Division I-A football season. In their third and final year under head coach Paul Hackett, the Trojans compiled an overall record of 5–7 record with a mark of 2–6 in conference play, placing in a three-way for eighth at the bottom of the Pac-10 standings, and were outscored by opponents 337 to 309. The team played home games at Los Angeles Memorial Coliseum in Los Angeles.

This was first time the USC finished last in the Pac-10. After winning the 18th Kickoff Classic against ranked Penn State, the Trojans won their next two non-conference games and were ranked as high as No. 8 in the AP poll. The game against San Jose State in September 23 was the 500th game USC played in the Coliseum, which the Trojans won after trailing 24–12. They lost their first conference game to Oregon State, breaking their 26-game winning streak against the conference rival, and then lost the next four games, tying with California and Washington State for last place in the Pac-10. Petros Papadakis, a team captain for the season and later a broadcaster, claims he was "the captain of the worst football team in USC history."

Quarterback Carson Palmer led the team in passing, completing 228 of 415 passes for 2,914 yards with 16 touchdowns and 18 interceptions. Sultan McCullough led the team in rushing with 227 carries for 1,163 yards and six touchdowns. Kareem Kelly led the team in receiving yards with 55 catches for 796 yards and four touchdowns.

== Schedule ==
Date	Time	Opponent	Rank	Site	TV	Result	Attendance	Source
August 27	11:30 a.m.	vs. No. 22 Penn State*	No. 15	Giants Stadium; East Rutherford, NJ (Kickoff Classic)	ABC	W 29–5	78,902	
September 9	5:00 p.m.	Colorado*	No. 11	Los Angeles Memorial Coliseum; Los Angeles, CA	ABC	W 17–14	65,153	
September 23	3:30 p.m.	San Jose State*	No. 9	Los Angeles Memorial Coliseum; Los Angeles, CA	FSNW2	W 34–24	56,545	
September 30	3:30 p.m.	at Oregon State	No. 8	Reser Stadium; Corvallis, OR	FSNW2	L 21–31	33,775	
October 7	12:30 p.m.	Arizona	No. 18	Los Angeles Memorial Coliseum; Los Angeles, CA	ABC	L 15–31	49,342	
October 14	12:30 p.m.	No. 9 Oregon		Los Angeles Memorial Coliseum; Los Angeles, CA	ABC	L 17–28	54,031	
October 21	12:30 p.m.	at Stanford		Stanford Stadium; Stanford, CA (rivalry)	ABC	L 30–32	50,125	
October 28	3:30 p.m.	California^{†}		Los Angeles Memorial Coliseum; Los Angeles, CA	FSN	L 16–28	54,393	
November 4	6:00 p.m.	at Arizona State		Sun Devil Stadium; Tempe, AZ	FSNW	W 44–38 ^{2OT}	49,865	
November 11	3:30 p.m.	Washington State		Los Angeles Memorial Coliseum; Los Angeles, CA	FSN	L 27–33	40,565	
November 18	3:30 p.m.	at UCLA		Rose Bowl; Pasadena, CA (Victory Bell)	FSNW2	W 38–35	80,227	
November 25	12:30 p.m.	No. 11 Notre Dame*		Los Angeles Memorial Coliseum; Los Angeles, CA (rivalry)	ABC	L 21–38	81,342	
*Non-conference game; ^{†}Homecoming; Rankings from AP Poll released prior to the game; All times are in Pacific time

== Rankings ==
Ranking movements Legend: ██ Increase in ranking ██ Decrease in ranking — = Not ranked
	Week																
Poll	Pre	1	2	3	4	5	6	7	8	9	10	11	12	13	14	15	Final
AP	15	12	11	10	9	8	18	—	—	—	—	—	—	—	—	—	—
Coaches Poll	16	13	12	11	9	7	16	—	—	—	—	—	—	—	—	—	—
BCS	Not released									—	—	—	—	—	—	—	Not released

== Game summaries ==
=== vs Penn State ===
	1	2	3	4	Total
No. 22 Nittany Lions	3	0	2	0	5
No. 15 Trojans	14	9	0	6	29

=== vs Colorado ===
	1	2	3	4	Total
Buffaloes	0	7	7	0	14
No. 11 Trojans	0	7	7	3	17

=== vs San Jose State ===
	1	2	3	4	Total
Spartans	10	14	0	0	24
No. 9 Trojans	0	12	0	22	34

=== at Oregon State ===
	1	2	3	4	Total
No. 8 Trojans	7	7	0	7	21
Beavers	14	0	0	17	31

=== vs Arizona ===
	1	2	3	4	Total
Wildcats	21	0	7	3	31
No. 18 Trojans	0	6	3	6	15

=== vs Oregon ===
	1	2	3	4	Total
No. 9 Ducks	7	7	7	7	28
Trojans	7	0	3	7	17

=== at Stanford ===
	1	2	3	4	Total
Trojans	0	8	13	9	30
Cardinal	7	7	6	12	32

=== vs California ===
	1	2	3	4	Total
Golden Bears	7	7	8	6	28
Trojans	6	10	0	0	16

=== at Arizona State ===
	1	2	3	4	OT	2OT	Total
Trojans	7	14	14	0	3	6	44
Sun Devils	3	0	10	22	3	0	38

=== vs Washington State ===
	1	2	3	4	Total
Cougars	0	12	7	14	33
Trojans	0	0	7	20	27

=== at UCLA ===
	1	2	3	4	Total
Trojans	7	14	7	10	38
Bruins	14	7	7	7	35

=== vs Notre Dame ===
	1	2	3	4	Total
No. 11 Fighting Irish	7	14	7	10	38
Trojans	7	7	0	7	21

== Roster ==
2000 USC Trojans football team roster
Players
Coaches
Offense

Pos.	#	Name	Class
C	50	Eric Denmon	Sr
OT	67	Phillip Eaves	Jr
RB	40	Miguel Fletcher	So
WR	7	Sandy Fletcher	Fr
WR	2	Kareem Kelly	So
FB	21	Malaefou MacKenzie	So
RB	4	Sultan McCullough	So
QB	3	Carson Palmer	So
QB	11	Mike Van Raaphorst	Sr

Defense

Pos.	#	Name	Class
CB	29	Chris Cash	Jr
LB	18	Kori Dickerson	Jr
LB	9	Zeke Moreno	Sr
S	47	John Morgan	Sr
DT	90	Ryan Nielsen	Jr
S	31	Ifeanyi Ohalete	Sr
S	43	Troy Polamalu	So
CB	42	Kris Richard	Jr
DT	93	Bernard Riley	So
LB	55	Markus Steele	Sr

Special teams

Pos.	#	Name	Class
PK	15	David Newbury	Jr

Head coach

- Paul Hackett

Coordinators/assistant coaches

Legend

- (C) Team captain
- (S) Suspended
- (I) Ineligible
- Injured
- Redshirt

Roster
Last update: 2001-02-16

== Awards ==
- No All-Pac-10 selections
