= 2000 California Golden Bears football team =

American college football season

2000 California Golden Bears football
- Conference: Pacific-10 Conference
- Record: 3–8 (2–6 Pac-10)
- Head coach: Tom Holmoe (4th season)
- Offensive coordinator: Steve Hagen (2nd season)
- Defensive coordinator: Lyle Setencich (4th season)
- Home stadium: California Memorial Stadium

2000 Pacific-10 Conference football standings
| | Conf. | | | Overall |
| Team | W | | L | W | | L |
|---|---|---|---|---|---|---|
| No. 4 Oregon State %+ | 7 | – | 1 | 11 | – | 1 |
| No. 3 Washington $+ | 7 | – | 1 | 11 | – | 1 |
| No. 7 Oregon + | 7 | – | 1 | 10 | – | 2 |
| Stanford | 4 | – | 4 | 5 | – | 6 |
| UCLA | 3 | – | 5 | 6 | – | 6 |
| Arizona State | 3 | – | 5 | 6 | – | 6 |
| Arizona | 3 | – | 5 | 5 | – | 6 |
| USC | 2 | – | 6 | 5 | – | 7 |
| Washington State | 2 | – | 6 | 4 | – | 7 |
| California | 2 | – | 6 | 3 | – | 8 |
$ – BCS representative as conference champion; % – BCS at-large representative; + – Conference co-champions; Rankings from AP Poll

The 2000 California Golden Bears football team was an American football team that represented the University of California, Berkeley as a member of the Pacific-10 Conference (Pac-10) during the 2000 NCAA Division I-A football season. In their fourth year under head coach Tom Holmoe, the Golden Bears compiled an overall record of 3–8 record with a mark of 2–6 against conference opponent), placing a three-way tie for eighth at the bottom of the Pac-10 standings, and were outscored by opponents 295 to 246. The team played home games at California Memorial Stadium in Berkeley, California.

The team's statistical leaders included Kyle Boller with 2,121 passing yards, Joe Igber with 901 rushing yards, and Geoff McArthur with 336 receiving yards.

== Schedule ==
| Date | Time | Opponent | Site | TV | Result | Attendance | Source |
|---|---|---|---|---|---|---|---|
| September 9 | 3:15 p.m. | Utah* | California Memorial Stadium; Berkeley, CA | FSNBA | W 24–21 | 44,500 | |
| September 16 | 9:00 a.m. | at No. 19 Illinois* | Memorial Stadium; Champaign, IL | ESPN2 | L 15–17 | 50,181 | |
| September 23 | 7:15 p.m. | at Fresno State* | Bulldog Stadium; Fresno, CA | FSN | L 3–17 | 42,285 | |
| September 30 | 2:30 p.m. | Washington State | California Memorial Stadium; Berkeley, CA | | L 17–21 | 30,500 | |
| October 7 | 3:30 p.m. | at Arizona State | Sun Devil Stadium; Tempe, AZ | FSN | L 10–30 | 41,113 | |
| October 14 | 12:30 p.m. | No. 13 UCLA | California Memorial Stadium; Berkeley, CA (rivalry) | | W 46–38 ^{3OT} | 53,000 | |
| October 21 | 3:30 p.m. | at No. 9 Washington | Husky Stadium; Seattle, WA | FSNBA | L 24–36 | 70,113 | |
| October 28 | 3:30 p.m. | at USC | Los Angeles Memorial Coliseum; Los Angeles, CA | FSNBA | W 28–16 | 54,393 | |
| November 4 | 12:30 p.m. | No. 14 Oregon State | California Memorial Stadium; Berkeley, CA | | L 32–38 | 36,000 | |
| November 11 | 12:30 p.m. | at No. 6 Oregon | Autzen Stadium; Eugene, OR | FSN | L 17–25 | 45,845 | |
| November 18 | 12:30 p.m. | Stanford | California Memorial Stadium; Berkeley, CA (Big Game) | | L 30–36 ^{OT} | 67,500 | |
*Non-conference game; Rankings from AP Poll released prior to the game; All times are in Pacific time

== Roster ==
2000 California Golden Bears football team roster
Players
Coaches
Offense

| Pos. | # | Name | Class |
|---|---|---|---|
| QB | 7 | Kyle Boller | So |
| OL | 63 | Mark Wilson | Fr |
| G | 64 | Scott Tercero | So |

Defense

| Pos. | # | Name | Class |
|---|---|---|---|
| CB | 1 | Jemeel Powell | So |
| S | 2 | Nnamdi Asomugha | So |
| CB | 25 | Chidi Iwuoma | Sr |
| S | 26 | Jeremy Drake | So |
| CB | 27 | Adam Sugarman | Jr |
| LB | 46 | Tully Banta-Cain | So |
| LB | 49 | Scott Fujita | Jr |
| DT | 94 | Jacob Waasdorp | Sr |
| DE | 97 | Andre Carter | Sr |

Special teams

| Pos. | # | Name | Class |
|---|---|---|---|
| P | 89 | Nick Harris | Sr |

Head coach

- Tom Holmoe (4th year)

Coordinators/assistant coaches

Legend

- (C) Team captain
- (S) Suspended
- (I) Ineligible
- Injured
- Redshirt

Roster
