= 2000 Washington State Cougars football team =

American college football season

2000 Washington State Cougars football
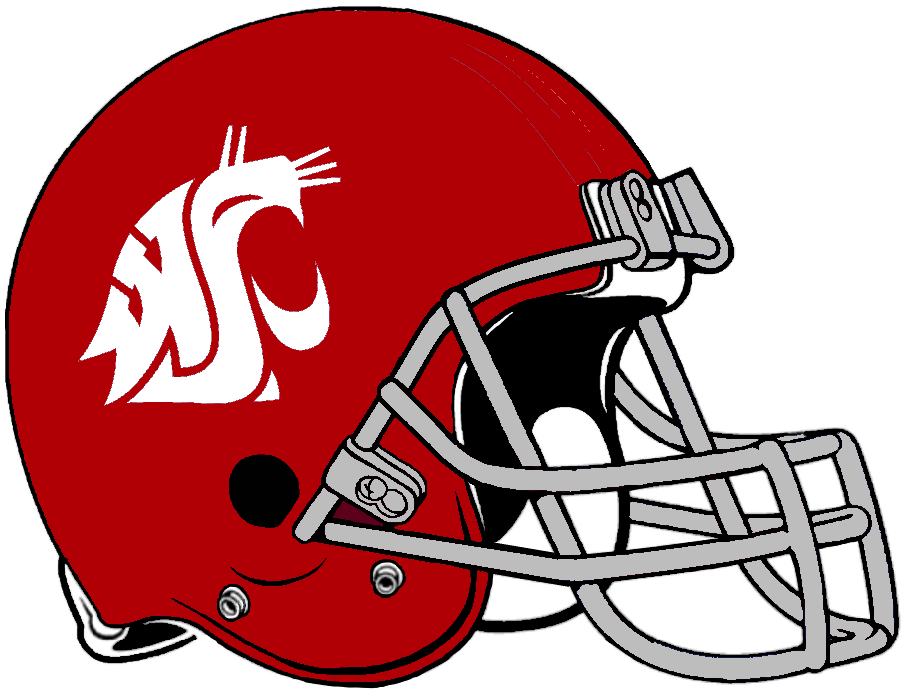
- Conference: Pacific-10 Conference
- Record: 4–7 (2–6 Pac-10)
- Head coach: Mike Price (12th season)
- Offensive coordinator: Jim McDonell (7th season)
- Offensive scheme: Spread
- Defensive coordinator: Bill Doba (7th season)
- Base defense: 4–3
- Home stadium: Martin Stadium

2000 Pacific-10 Conference football standings
	Conf.			Overall
Team	W		L	W		L
No. 4 Oregon State %+	7	–	1	11	–	1
No. 3 Washington $+	7	–	1	11	–	1
No. 7 Oregon +	7	–	1	10	–	2
Stanford	4	–	4	5	–	6
UCLA	3	–	5	6	–	6
Arizona State	3	–	5	6	–	6
Arizona	3	–	5	5	–	6
USC	2	–	6	5	–	7
Washington State	2	–	6	4	–	7
California	2	–	6	3	–	8
$ – BCS representative as conference champion; % – BCS at-large representative; + – Conference co-champions; Rankings from AP Poll

The 2000 Washington State Cougars football team represented Washington State University as a member of the Pacific-10 Conference during the 2000 NCAA Division I-A football season. Led by 12th-year head coach Mike Price, the Cougars compiled an overall record of 4–7 with a mark of 2–6 in conference play, placing in a three-way tie for eighth the Pac-10. Washington State played home games on campus at Martin Stadium in Pullman, Washington.

== Schedule ==
Date	Time	Opponent	Site	TV	Result	Attendance	Source
September 2	7:15 pm	Stanford	Martin Stadium; Pullman, WA	FSN	L 10–24	21,793	
September 16	5:00 pm	at Utah*	Rice–Eccles Stadium; Salt Lake City, UT		W 38–21	38,814	
September 23	2:00 pm	Idaho*^{†}	Martin Stadium; Pullman, WA (Battle of the Palouse)		L 34–38	31,409	
September 30	2:30 pm	at California	California Memorial Stadium; Berkeley, CA		W 21–17	30,500	
October 7	2:00 pm	Boise State*	Martin Stadium; Pullman, WA		W 42–35	25,129	
October 14	6:00 pm	at No. 22 Arizona	Arizona Stadium; Tucson, AZ		L 47–53 ^{3OT}	50,350	
October 21	2:00 pm	Arizona State	Martin Stadium; Pullman, WA		L 20–23 ^{OT}	25,199	
October 28	1:00 pm	at No. 18 Oregon State	Reser Stadium; Corvallis, OR		L 9–38	34,491	
November 4	2:00 pm	No. 7 Oregon	Martin Stadium; Pullman, WA	FSN	L 24–27 ^{OT}	23,314	
November 11	3:30 pm	at USC	Memorial Coliseum; Los Angeles, CA	FSN	W 33–27	40,565	
November 18	3:30 pm	No. 5 Washington	Martin Stadium; Pullman, WA (Apple Cup)	FSN	L 3–51	33,010	
*Non-conference game; ^{†}Homecoming; Rankings from AP Poll released prior to the game; All times are in Pacific time
