= 2000 Stanford Cardinal football team =

American college football season

2000 Stanford Cardinal football
- Conference: Pacific-10 Conference
- Record: 5–6 (4–4 Pac-10)
- Head coach: Tyrone Willingham (6th season)
- Offensive coordinator: Bill Diedrick (3rd season)
- Offensive scheme: West Coast
- Defensive coordinator: Kent Baer (2nd season)
- Base defense: 4–3
- Home stadium: Stanford Stadium

2000 Pacific-10 Conference football standings
	Conf.			Overall
Team	W		L	W		L
No. 4 Oregon State %+	7	–	1	11	–	1
No. 3 Washington $+	7	–	1	11	–	1
No. 7 Oregon +	7	–	1	10	–	2
Stanford	4	–	4	5	–	6
UCLA	3	–	5	6	–	6
Arizona State	3	–	5	6	–	6
Arizona	3	–	5	5	–	6
USC	2	–	6	5	–	7
Washington State	2	–	6	4	–	7
California	2	–	6	3	–	8
$ – BCS representative as conference champion; % – BCS at-large representative; + – Conference co-champions; Rankings from AP Poll

The 2000 Stanford Cardinal football team represented Stanford University as a member of the Pacific-10 Conference (Pac-10) during 2000 NCAA Division I-A football season. Led by sixth-year head coach Tyrone Willingham, the Cardinal compiled an overall record of 5–6 with a mark of 4–4 in conference play, placing fourth in the Pac-10. The team played home games at Stanford Stadium in Stanford, California.

== Schedule ==
Date	Time	Opponent	Site	TV	Result	Attendance	Source
September 2	7:15 p.m.	at Washington State	Martin Stadium; Pullman, WA	FSN	W 24–10	21,793	
September 9	7:00 p.m.	San Jose State*	Stanford Stadium; Stanford, CA (rivalry)		L 27–40	41,525	
September 16	7:15 p.m.	No. 5 Texas*	Stanford Stadium; Stanford, CA	FSN	W 27–24	43,970	
September 30	2:00 p.m.	Arizona	Stanford Stadium; Stanford, CA		L 3–27	31,165	
October 7	11:30 a.m.	at No. 25 Notre Dame*	Notre Dame Stadium; Notre Dame, IN (rivalry)	NBC	L 14–20	80,232	
October 14	3:30 p.m.	at No. 23 Oregon State	Reser Stadium; Corvallis, OR	FSN	L 6–38	34,777	
October 21	12:30 p.m.	USC	Stanford Stadium; Stanford, CA (rivalry)	ABC	W 32–30	50,125	
October 28	2:00 p.m.	No. 9 Washington	Stanford Stadium; Stanford, CA		L 28–31	31,300	
November 4	3:30 p.m.	at UCLA	Rose Bowl; Pasadena, CA (rivalry)	FSN	L 35–37	64,039	
November 11	2:00 p.m.	Arizona State	Stanford Stadium; Stanford, CA		W 29–7	29,795	
November 18	12:30 p.m.	at California	California Memorial Stadium; Berkeley, CA (Big Game)	KGO	W 36–30 ^{OT}	67,500	
*Non-conference game; Rankings from AP Poll released prior to the game; All times are in Pacific time

== Game summaries ==
=== At Washington State ===
	1	2	3	4	Total
Cardinal					0
Cougars					0

=== San Jose State ===
	1	2	3	4	Total
Spartans					0
Cardinal					0

=== Texas ===
	1	2	3	4	Total
No. 5 Longhorns					0
Cardinal					0

=== Arizona ===
	1	2	3	4	Total
Wildcats					0
Cardinal					0

=== At Notre Dame ===
	1	2	3	4	Total
Cardinal					0
No. 25 Fighting Irish					0

=== At Oregon State ===
	1	2	3	4	Total
Cardinal					0
No. 23 Beavers					0

=== USC ===
	1	2	3	4	Total
Trojans					0
Cardinal					0

=== Washington ===
	1	2	3	4	Total
No. 9 Huskies					0
Cardinal					0

=== At UCLA ===
	1	2	3	4	Total
Cardinal					0
Bruins					0

=== Arizona State ===
	1	2	3	4	Total
Sun Devils					0
Cardinal					0

=== At California ===
	1	2	3	4	Total
Cardinal					0
Golden Bears					0

== Coaching staff ==
- Tyrone Willingham: head coach
- Bill Diedrick: offensive coordinator and quarterbacks
- Buzz Preston: running backs
- Mose Rison: wide receivers
- Tom Brattan: offensive line (centers and guards)
- Chuck Moller: tight ends and offensive line (tackles)
- Kent Baer: defensive coordinator and linebackers
- Phil Zacharias: defensive ends and special teams coordinator
- Denny Schuler: defensive backs
- Dave Tipton: recruiting coordinator
