= 2000 Holiday Bowl =

2000 Culligan Holiday Bowl
Texas Longhorns	Oregon Ducks
(9–2)	(9–2)
Big 12	Pac-10
30	35
Head coach: Mack Brown	Head coach: Mike Bellotti
AP / Coaches / BCS; 12 / 12 / 12	AP / Coaches / BCS; 8 / 11 / 10
	1	2	3	4	Total
Texas	0	21	0	9	30
Oregon	14	0	7	14	35
- Date: December 29, 2000
- Season: 2000
- Stadium: Qualcomm Stadium
- Location: San Diego, California
- MVP: Offensive: Joey Harrington, Oregon; Defensive: Rashad Bauman, Oregon
- Referee: Judson Howard (Big West)
- Halftime show: Marching bands (including Millard South High School Marching Band from Omaha, NE, Lincoln High School Marching Band from Lincoln, NE, Elk City High School from Elk City, OK, and Buena High School from Sierra Vista, AZ)
- Attendance: 63,278
- Payout: US$2,005,743 per team

United States TV coverage
- Network: ESPN
- Announcers: Mike Tirico (Play by Play); Lee Corso (Analyst); Kirk Herbstreit (Analyst); Dr. Jerry Punch (Sideline)

The 2000 Holiday Bowl was a college football bowl game played December 29, 2000 in San Diego, California. It was part of the 2000 NCAA Division I-A football season. It featured the 2000 Pac-10 co- champions Oregon Ducks and the Texas Longhorns. Oregon won the game by a final score of 35–30.

== Game summary ==
- Oregon – Justin Peelle 1 yard touchdown from Joey Harrington (Josh Frankel kick), 6:25
- Oregon – Joey Harrington 18 yard touchdown from Keenan Howry (Josh Frankel kick), 12:41
- Texas – Hodges Mitchell 3 yard touchdown run (Kris Stockton kick), 4:21
- Texas – Chris Simms 4 yard touchdown run (Kris Stockton kick), 10:46
- Texas – Greg Brown 23 yard interception return (Kris Stockton kick), 11:14
- Oregon – Maurice Morris 55 yard touchdown from Joey Harrington (Josh Frankel kick), 2:28
- Oregon – Joey Harrington 9 yard touchdown run (Josh Frankel kick), 5:17
- Texas – Victor Ike 93 yard kickoff return (Kris Stockton kick), 5:35
- Oregon – Jason Willis 4 yard touchdown run (Josh Frankel kick), 9:14
- Texas – Safety, 14:39

Oregon scored first when quarterback Joey Harrington threw a one yard touchdown pass to tight end Justin Peelle, which gave the Ducks an early 7–0 lead. Later in the first quarter, wide receiver Keenan Howry threw an 18 yard touchdown pass to Harrington on a trick play for a 14–0 Duck lead.

Texas responded after running back Hodges Mitchell scored on a three yard touchdown run, making it 14–7. Texas Quarterback Chris Simms later tied the game at 14–14 on a four-yard touchdown run. 30 seconds later, cornerback Greg Brown intercepted a pass and returned it 23 yards for a touchdown, putting Texas up 21–14. That score held up until halftime.

In the third quarter, Joey Harrington threw a 55 yard touchdown pass to running back Maurice Morris, and Oregon tied the game at 21. In the fourth quarter, Oregon reclaimed the lead after Harrington ran for a nine-yard touchdown score, which gave the Ducks a 28–21 lead. On the ensuing kickoff, a mere 17 seconds later, Victor Ike of Texas returned it 93 yards for a touchdown which evened the score at 28. Jason Willis of Oregon scored the go ahead touchdown run to give Oregon a 35–28 lead. A Texas safety, moved Texas within 35–30, which held up to be the final score, as Texas drove down the field after the safety but dropped potential touchdown passes to end the drive.

== Statistics ==
Statistics	Texas	Oregon
First downs	19	21
Rushing yards	54	129
Passing yards	245	291
Total offense	342	340
Return yards	45	1
Passing	17–33–4	20–32–1
Fumbles–lost	3–1	1–1
Penalties–yards	6–55	6–50
Punts–average	3–42.3	5–32.4
