= Chad Ward =

American football player (born 1977)

No. 71
- Position: Guard

Personal information
- Born: January 12, 1977 (age 49); Finley, Washington, U.S.
- Listed height: 6 ft 4 in (1.93 m)
- Listed weight: 320 lb (145 kg)

Career information
- High school: River View (Kennewick, Washington)
- College: Washington
- NFL draft: 2001: 6th round, 170th overall pick

Career history
- Jacksonville Jaguars (2001)*; San Francisco 49ers (2001); Cleveland Browns (2002–2003)*; San Diego Chargers (2004)*; Scottish Claymores (2004)
- * Offseason or practice squad member only

Awards and highlights
- First-team All-American (2000); Morris Trophy (2000); First-team All-Pac-10 (2000); Second-team All-Pac-10 (1999)

Chad Ward (born January 12, 1977) is an American former professional football player who was an offensive guard in the National Football League (NFL). He played college football for the Washington Huskies and was selected in the sixth round of the 2001 NFL draft by the Jacksonville Jaguars.

== College career ==
After completing high school, Ward played college football at the University of Washington.
