= 2001 Rose Bowl =

American college football game

2001 Rose Bowl presented by AT&T
- 87th Rose Bowl Game
Purdue Boilermakers	Washington Huskies
(8–3)	(10–1)
Big Ten	Pac-10
24	34
Head coach: Joe Tiller	Head coach: Rick Neuheisel
AP / Coaches / BCS; 14 / 14 / 17	AP / Coaches / BCS; 4 / 4 / 4
	1	2	3	4	Total
Purdue	0	10	7	7	24
Washington	14	0	6	14	34
- Date: January 1, 2001
- Season: 2000
- Stadium: Rose Bowl
- Location: Pasadena, California
- Player of the Game: Marques Tuiasosopo (Washington QB)
- Favorite: Purdue by 2 points
- Referee: Jack Childress (ACC)
- Halftime show: University of Washington Husky Marching Band, Purdue All-American Marching Band
- Attendance: 94,392

United States TV coverage
- Network: ABC
- Announcers: Keith Jackson (play-by-play); Tim Brant (analyst); Todd Harris (sideline)

The 2001 Rose Bowl was a college football bowl game played on January 1, 2001. It was the 87th Rose Bowl Game, and matched the champions of the Big Ten and Pac-10 conferences.

The University of Washington Huskies defeated the Purdue University Boilermakers 34–24. Washington senior quarterback Marques Tuiasosopo was named the Player of the Game.

== Teams ==
=== Washington Huskies ===
In the 2000 season, the Huskies shared the Pacific-10 Conference title with Oregon and Oregon State. Washington had given Oregon State their only defeat of the year 33-30. Oregon gave Washington their only defeat of the year 23-16. Oregon State beat Oregon in the 2000 Civil War game 23-13. Ultimately, it was a 23-37 loss at Wisconsin by Oregon earlier in the season that decided the Rose Bowl representative. With two losses, by the multiple team tie rules Oregon was out of the running. This left Oregon State and Washington, and the Huskies won the head-to-head matchup with the Beavers. Washington, Oregon State, and Oregon were ranked fourth, fifth, and ninth, respectively, in the final regular season AP football poll.

It was the fourteenth Rose Bowl appearance for Washington, but their first since going to three straight in the early 1990s under head coach Don James. Despite their record and ranking, the Huskies were a slight underdog to Purdue.

=== Purdue Boilermakers ===
The Big Ten champion Purdue Boilermakers were led by quarterback Drew Brees. They did not have a particularly auspicious start, winning against Central Michigan and Kent State before losing at Notre Dame. They defeated Minnesota, but then lost at struggling Penn State. The Boilermakers made surprising wins in October starting with Michigan, at Northwestern, at Wisconsin, and finishing with Ohio State. A 30-10 drubbing at the hands of Michigan State set them back, but a win over Indiana and losses by Michigan and Ohio State left them in a three-way tie with Northwestern and Michigan. Purdue got the Rose Bowl invitation by virtue of the head-to-head victories over both teams.

== Game summary ==
=== First quarter ===
- Washington – Cleman, 1-yard run, 8:33 (Anderson kick)
- Washington – Tuiasosopo, 5-yard run, 4:42 (Anderson kick)

=== Second quarter ===
- Purdue – Sutherland, 5-yard pass from Drew Brees, 11:32 (Dorsch kick)
- Purdue – Dorsch, 26-yard field goal, 0:26

=== Third quarter ===
- Washington – Anderson, 47-yard field goal, 13:12
- Purdue – Sutherland, 24-yard pass from Brees, 11:58 (Dorsch kick)
- Washington – Anderson, 42-yard field goal, 6:55

=== Fourth quarter ===
- Washington – Elstrom, 8-yard pass from Tuiasosopo, 12:00 (Anderson kick)
- Washington – Hurst, 8-yard run, 7:25 (Anderson kick)
- Purdue – Brown, 42-yard run, 6:37 (Dorsch kick)

== Aftermath ==
Washington, led by senior quarterback Marques Tuiasosopo, the Rose Bowl MVP, finished the season at 11–1 and was ranked third in the final polls. Rick Neuheisel became the only former Rose Bowl MVP to win a Rose Bowl as head coach.

Oregon State and Oregon both won their bowl games, and the final rankings were Washington 3rd, Oregon State 4th, and Oregon 7th in the final AP poll. Oklahoma, who was undefeated and beat Florida State in the Orange Bowl, was named the national champion. Washington's victory broke a four-game win streak by the Big Ten in the Rose Bowl.

This was Purdue's second Rose Bowl appearance, as both of Purdue's starting Rose Bowl quarterbacks (Bob Griese and Brees) eventually started and won the Super Bowl.
