= 2000 Arizona State Sun Devils football team =

American college football season

2000 Arizona State Sun Devils football

Aloha Bowl, L 17–31 vs. Boston College
- Conference: Pacific-10 Conference
- Record: 6–6 (3–5 Pac-10)
- Head coach: Bruce Snyder (9th season)
- Offensive coordinator: John Pettas (1st season)
- Defensive coordinator: Phil Snow (6th season)
- Home stadium: Sun Devil Stadium

2000 Pacific-10 Conference football standings
	Conf.			Overall
Team	W		L	W		L
No. 4 Oregon State %+	7	–	1	11	–	1
No. 3 Washington $+	7	–	1	11	–	1
No. 7 Oregon +	7	–	1	10	–	2
Stanford	4	–	4	5	–	6
UCLA	3	–	5	6	–	6
Arizona State	3	–	5	6	–	6
Arizona	3	–	5	5	–	6
USC	2	–	6	5	–	7
Washington State	2	–	6	4	–	7
California	2	–	6	3	–	8
$ – BCS representative as conference champion; % – BCS at-large representative; + – Conference co-champions; Rankings from AP Poll

The 2000 Arizona State Sun Devils football team represented Arizona State University as a member of the Pacific-10 Conference (Pac-10) during the 2000 NCAA Division I-A football season. In their ninth and final season under head coach Bruce Snyder, the Sun Devils compiled an overall record of 6–6 with a mark of 3–5 in conference play, placing in a three-way tie for fifth in the Pac-10. Arizona State was invited to the Aloha Bowl, where the Sun Devils lost to Boston College. The team played home games at Sun Devil Stadium in Tempe, Arizona.

Snyder was fired at the end of the season.

== Schedule ==
Date	Time	Opponent	Site	TV	Result	Attendance
August 31	7:00 pm	at San Diego State*	Qualcomm Stadium; San Diego, CA	ESPN2	W 10–7	30,931
September 16	7:00 pm	Colorado State*	Sun Devil Stadium; Tempe, AZ	KTVK	W 13–10	51,911
September 23	7:00 pm	Utah State*	Sun Devil Stadium; Tempe, AZ	KTVK	W 44–20	46,327
September 30	7:15 pm	at No. 15 UCLA	Rose Bowl; Pasadena, CA	FSN	L 31–38	68,113
October 7	3:30 pm	California	Sun Devil Stadium; Tempe, AZ	FSN	W 30–10	41,113
October 14	7:15 pm	No. 11 Washington^{†}	Sun Devil Stadium; Tempe, AZ	FSN	L 15–21	61,370
October 21	2:00 pm	at Washington State	Martin Stadium; Pullman, WA		W 23–20 ^{OT}	25,199
October 28	12:30 pm	No. 7 Oregon^{†}	Sun Devil Stadium; Tempe, AZ	ABC	L 55–56 ^{2OT}	53,085
November 4	7:00 pm	USC	Sun Devil Stadium; Tempe, AZ		L 38–44 ^{2OT}	49,865
November 11	3:00 pm	at Stanford	Stanford Stadium; Stanford, CA		L 7–29	29,795
November 24	3:00 pm	at Arizona	Arizona Stadium; Tucson, AZ (rivalry)	FSN	W 30–17	54,297
December 25	1:30 pm	vs. Boston College*	Aloha Stadium; Halawa, HI (Aloha Bowl)	ABC	L 17–31	24,397
*Non-conference game; ^{†}Homecoming; Rankings from AP Poll released prior to the game; All times are in Mountain time

== Game summaries ==
=== Washington State ===
Team	1	2	3	4	OT	Total
• Arizona State	14	6	0	0	3	23
Washington State	3	9	8	0	0	20

- Date: October 21
- Location: Martin Stadium, Pullman, WA
- Game attendance: 25,199

Scoring summary
1	ASU	M. Williams 1 yard run (Barth kick)	Arizona St 7–0
1	ASU	Pace 2 yard run (Barth kick)	Arizona St 14–0
1	WSU	A. Wilaikul 37 yard field goal	Arizona St 14–3
2	WSU	Barnett 8 yard run (A. Wilaikul kick)	Arizona St 14–10
2	WSU	Safety	Arizona St 14–12
2	ASU	O'Neal 34 yard pass from Goodman (kick failed)	Arizona St 20–12
3	WSU	M. Williams 56 yard pass from Gesser (M. Williams pass from Gesser)	Tie 20–20
OT	ASU	Barth 41 yard field goal	Arizona St 23–20
