= River View High School (Washington) =

Location
- 36509 S. Lemon Drive; Kennewick, Washington; United States; 46°09′19″N 119°02′14″W

Information
- Type: Public school
- Established: 1890s
- School district: Finley School District #053
- Superintendent: Brian Long
- Principal: Chris Davis
- Teaching staff: 16.20 (FTE)
- Grades: 9-12
- Enrollment: 299 (2023-2024)
- Student to teacher ratio: 18.46
- Campus type: Rural
- Colors: Black and red
- Athletics: EWAC
- Mascot: Panthers
- Website: River View H.S.

River View High School is a public high school located in Kennewick, Washington that serves 299 students in grades 9–12. 65% of the students are white, while 30% are Hispanic, 3% are two or more races, 1% are American Indian and 1% are Asian. In 2018, River View built a new football stadium, commonly known as Panther Field. The high school finished a "modernization" remodel project in 2018.

The School currently Offers 7 Varsity Sports, including Football, Volleyball, Boys Basketball, Girls Basketball, Cheerleading, Baseball, Softball, and Track (Coed).
