= History of Oregon State Beavers football =

American university football team history

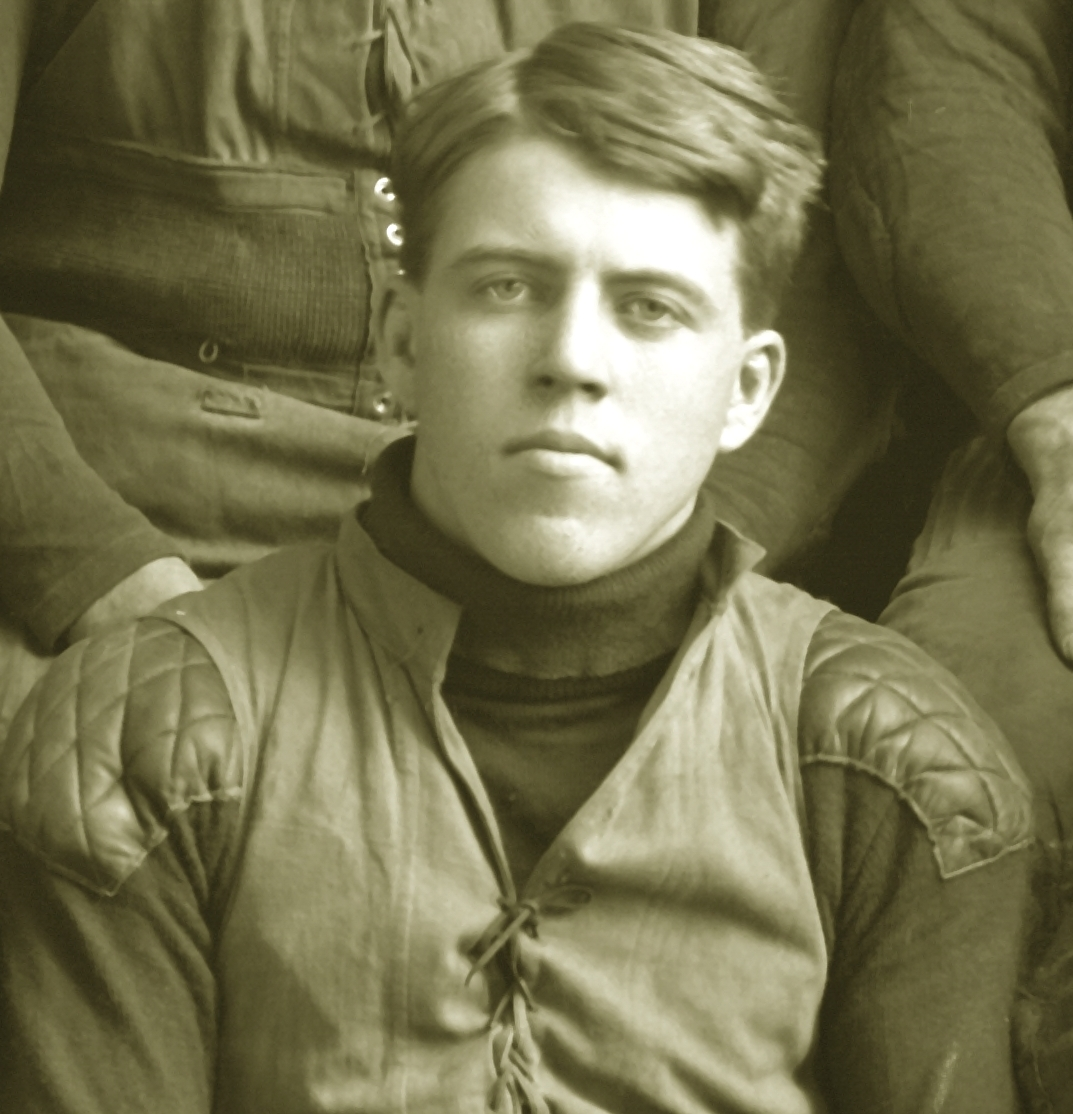
Fred Norcross in 1903.

The history of Oregon State Beavers football covers more than 130 seasons since the team began play in 1893.

In 1893, Oregon State University, known first as Oregon State Agricultural College, hired William H. Bloss as the first coach. Bloss also served as the quarterback of the 1893 team. The son of the school's president, Bloss moved to Corvallis, Oregon in June 1892. He previously played football in the Midwest and was considered a very knowledgeable student of the game. Bloss scheduled tryouts in the fall of 1893 trying to assemble a football team. By mid-October, he had assembled a 17-player roster. The team was a hodgepodge of young men from the Corvallis area. Four players were not students, including Coach Bloss. One was a high school junior and another was a faculty member.

The team played its first games on an open grass lot with a perimeter fence. In 1896 or 1897, bleachers were built for the south side, which was designated the home side, and in 1899–1901, bleachers were built for the visitors on the north side. It was first known as College Field on Lower Campus. The first game was played on November 11, 1893, at College Field on Lower Campus against Albany College. Over 500 spectators, who paid a ten-cent admission, cheered on OSU for a 62–0 victory. Brady F. Burnett scored the first touchdown in Oregon State history on a fumble return.

In 1906, Oregon State hired Fred Norcross as its head football coach. Norcross had played quarterback for Fielding H. Yost's "Point a Minute" Michigan Wolverines from 1903 to 1905. Through the first six games of the 1906 season, the college had compiled a 4–0–2 record, outscoring opponents, 77–0. In the final game of the season, Willamette defeated Oregon State, kicking a 23-yard field goal midway through the first half, the only points either team scored. Despite the result, Oregon State students marched through the streets of Salem, Oregon, chanting the early OSU fight songs.
