= Ortege Jenkins =

American football player (born 1978)

No. 13, 16
- Position: Quarterback

Personal information
- Born: February 1, 1978 (age 48); Santa Ana, California, U.S.

Career information
- High school: Jordan (Long Beach, California)
- College: Arizona

Career history
- 2001: Baltimore Ravens*
- 2001–2002: BC Lions
- * Offseason or practice squad member only

Career statistics
- TD–INT: 0–1
- Passing yards: 42

Ortege Lamar Jenkins (born February 1, 1978) is an American former professional football player who was a quarterback for the BC Lions of the Canadian Football League (CFL). He played college football for the Arizona Wildcats. He signed with the Baltimore Ravens as an undrafted free agent in 2001 but was released before the season.

Jenkins also played one season with the Arizona Wildcats basketball team.
