= 2000 Oregon Ducks football team =

American college football season

2000 Oregon Ducks football

Pac-10 co-champion Holiday Bowl champion

Holiday Bowl, W 35–30 vs. Texas
- Conference: Pacific-10 Conference

Ranking
- Coaches: No. 9
- AP: No. 7
- Record: 10–2 (7–1 Pac-10)
- Head coach: Mike Bellotti (6th season)
- Offensive coordinator: Jeff Tedford (3rd season)
- Offensive scheme: Pro-style
- Defensive coordinator: Nick Aliotti (4th season)
- Base defense: 4–3
- Captain: Game captains
- Home stadium: Autzen Stadium

2000 Pacific-10 Conference football standings
	Conf.			Overall
Team	W		L	W		L
No. 4 Oregon State %+	7	–	1	11	–	1
No. 3 Washington $+	7	–	1	11	–	1
No. 7 Oregon +	7	–	1	10	–	2
Stanford	4	–	4	5	–	6
UCLA	3	–	5	6	–	6
Arizona State	3	–	5	6	–	6
Arizona	3	–	5	5	–	6
USC	2	–	6	5	–	7
Washington State	2	–	6	4	–	7
California	2	–	6	3	–	8
$ – BCS representative as conference champion; % – BCS at-large representative; + – Conference co-champions; Rankings from AP Poll

The 2000 Oregon Ducks football team represented the University of Oregon as a member of the Pacific-10 Conference (Pac-10) during the 2000 NCAA Division I-A football season. Led by sixth-year head coach Mike Bellotti, the Ducks compiled an overall record of 10–2 with a mark of 7–1 in conference play, sharing the Pac-10 title with Oregon State and Washington. Oregon was invited to the Holiday Bowl, where the Ducks beat Texas. The team played home games at Autzen Stadium in Eugene, Oregon.

Oregon's roster on offense included quarterbacks Joey Harrington and A. J. Feeley, running backs Maurice Morris, Allan Amundson, Ryan Shaw, and Josh Line, receivers Marshaun Tucker, Sonny Cook, Cy Aleman, and tight ends Justin Peelle and Lacorey Collins.

== Schedule ==
Date	Time	Opponent	Rank	Site	TV	Result	Attendance	Source
September 2	12:30 pm	Nevada*		Autzen Stadium; Eugene, OR		W 36–7	43,371	
September 9	12:30 pm	at No. 5 Wisconsin*		Camp Randall Stadium; Madison, WI	ABC	L 23–27	78,521	
September 16	3:30 pm	Idaho*		Autzen Stadium; Eugene, OR	OSN	W 42–13	43,770	
September 23	12:30 pm	No. 6 UCLA		Autzen Stadium; Eugene, OR (College GameDay)	FSN	W 29–10	45,470	
September 30	12:30 pm	No. 6 Washington	No. 20	Autzen Stadium; Eugene, OR (rivalry)	ABC	W 23–16	46,153	
October 14	12:30 pm	at USC	No. 9	Los Angeles Memorial Coliseum; Los Angeles, CA (rivalry)	ABC	W 28–17	54,031	
October 21	7:15 pm	No. 21 Arizona	No. 9	Autzen Stadium; Eugene, OR	FSN	W 14–10	45,950	
October 28	12:30 pm	at Arizona State	No. 7	Sun Devil Stadium; Tempe, AZ	ABC	W 56–55 ^{2OT}	53,085	
November 4	2:00 pm	at Washington State	No. 7	Martin Stadium; Pullman, WA		W 27–24 ^{OT}	23,314	
November 11	12:30 pm	California	No. 6	Autzen Stadium; Eugene, OR	FSN	W 25–17	45,845	
November 18	12:30 pm	at No. 8 Oregon State	No. 5	Reser Stadium; Corvallis, OR (Civil War)	ABC	L 13–23	36,044	
December 29	5:30 pm	vs. No. 12 Texas*	No. 8	Qualcomm Stadium; San Diego, CA (Holiday Bowl)	ESPN	W 35–30	63,278	
*Non-conference game; Rankings from AP Poll released prior to the game; All times are in Pacific time; Source:

== Rankings ==
Ranking movements Legend: ██ Increase in ranking ██ Decrease in ranking — = Not ranked
	Week																
Poll	Pre	1	2	3	4	5	6	7	8	9	10	11	12	13	14	15	Final
AP	—	—	—	—	—	20	9	9	7	7	7	6	5	10	9	8	7
Coaches	—	—	—	—	—	25	15	12	11	10	8	7	6	11	11	11	9
BCS	Not released									8	7	7	7	10	10	10	Not released

== Game summaries ==
=== Arizona State ===
Oregon played at Arizona State in the 2000 college football season. Oregon trailed 49–35 in the final four minutes. The Ducks scored a touchdown to make it a one possession game, but then were unable to score after getting the ball back late in the game. With possession and time on its side, Arizona State needed just a single first down to run out the clock and win the game. But as Arizona State freshman running back Mike Williams was crossing the first down marker, he fumbled the ball and Oregon was able to recover it at the 17-yard line, giving the Ducks one last chance. Joey Harrington then hit Justin Peelle with a touchdown pass to tie the game with 27 seconds left. After neither team was able to score in the first overtime period, Oregon scored on a one-yard run by Allan Amundson and the extra point by Josh Frankel put them up by seven points in the second overtime. Freshman Jeff Krohn then threw his fifth touchdown pass on Arizona State's next possession, finding Richard Williams from 21 yards out and bringing the Sun Devils within a PAT of forcing a 3rd overtime. After an Oregon touchdown, and instead of kicking the extra point after scoring, Arizona State faked the kick and had quarterback Jeff Krohn roll out to his right, throwing a pass toward tight end Todd Heap in the back of the end zone. The pass tipped off Heap's extended hand and fell incomplete, giving Oregon a 56-55 double overtime victory.

=== Washington State ===
Oregon at Washington State

Team	1	2	3	4	OT	Total
• Oregon	13	3	0	8	3	27
Washington State	10	7	0	7	0	24

- Date: November 4
- Location: Martin Stadium • Pullman, WA
- Game attendance: 23,314
- Source: USA Today

Scoring summary
1		Oregon	Maurice Morris 9-yard run (Josh Frankel kick)	Oregon 7-0
1		Washington St	Adam Hawkins 1-yard run (Anousith Wilaikul kick)	Tie 7-7
1		Washington St	Anousith Wilaikul 41-yard field goal	Washington St 10-7
1		Oregon	Rashad Bauman 42-yard interception return (kick failed)	Oregon 13-10
2		Oregon	Josh Frankel 46-yard field goal	Oregon 16-10
2		Washington St	Dave Minnich 2-yard run (Anousith Wilaikul kick)	Washington St 17-16
4	12:25	Washington St	Matt Kegel 1-yard run (Anousith Wilaikul kick)	Washington St 24-16
4	5:52	Oregon	Marshawn Tucker 38-yard pass from Joey Harrington (two-point conversion good)	Tie 24-24
OT		Oregon	Josh Frankel 47-yard field goal	Oregon 27-24

Defensive tackle Jed Boice blocked Anousith Wilaikul's 39-yard field goal attempt in overtime to win the game.

=== Holiday Bowl ===
Team	1	2	3	4	Total
Texas	0	21	0	9	30
• Oregon	14	0	7	14	35

- Date: December 29
- Location: Qualcomm Stadium, San Diego, CA
- Game attendance: 63,278
- TV announcers (ESPN): Mike Tirico (Play-by-play), Lee Corso (Color) & Kirk Herbstreit (Color)
- Source: Sports Illustrated

Scoring summary
1		ORE	Peelle 1-yard pass from Harrington (Frankel kick)	ORE 7-0
1		ORE	Harrington 18-yard pass from Howry (Frankel kick)	ORE 14-0
2		TEX	Mitchell 3-yard run (Stockton kick)	ORE 14-7
2		TEX	Simms 4-yard run (Stockton kick)	Tied 14-14
2		TEX	Brown 23-yard interception return (Stockton kick)	TEX 21-14
3		ORE	Morris 55-yard pass from Harrington (Frankel kick)	Tied 21-21
4	9:43	ORE	Harrington 9-yard run (Frankel kick)	ORE 28-21
4		TEX	Ike 93-yard kickoff return (Stockton kick)	Tied 28-28
4	5:46	ORE	Willis 4-yard run (Frankel kick)	ORE 35-28
4	0:21	TEX	Safety, tackled in end zone	ORE 35-30

== Roster ==
2000 Oregon Ducks football team roster
Players
Coaches
Offense

Pos.	#	Name	Class
QB	3	Joey Harrington	Jr
WR	4	Samie Parker	Fr
QB	7	A. J. Feeley	Sr
TE	84	Justin Peelle	Jr

Defense

Pos.	#	Name	Class
CB	13	Brian Johnson	Sr
CB	17	Rashad Bauman	Jr
LB	18	Wesly Mallard	Jr

Special teams

Pos.	#	Name	Class

Head coach

- Mike Bellotti

Coordinators/assistant coaches

Legend

- (C) Team captain
- (S) Suspended
- (I) Ineligible
- Injured
- Redshirt

Roster
Last update: 2000-12-02
