= Ken Simonton =

American gridiron football player (born 1979)

No. 35
- Position: Running back

Personal information
- Born: June 7, 1979 (age 47); Pittsburg, California, U.S.
- Listed height: 5 ft 7 in (1.70 m)
- Listed weight: 201 lb (91 kg)

Career information
- College: Oregon State

Career history
- 2002: San Francisco 49ers*
- 2003: Scottish Claymores
- 2003: Buffalo Bills
- 2004: San Francisco 49ers
- 2005: Detroit Lions*
- 2007–2008: Calgary Stampeders
- * Offseason or practice squad member only

Awards and highlights
- First-team All-American (2000); First-team All-Pac-10 (2000); Second-team All-Pac-10 (1999)
- Stats at Pro Football Reference

Ken Simonton III (born June 7, 1979) is an American former professional football player who was a running back in the National Football League (NFL). He played college football for the Oregon State Beavers, earning first-team All-American honors in 2000. After a brief career in the NFL and NFL Europe, he played in the Canadian Football League (CFL) for the Calgary Stampeders.

== Early life ==
Simonton's family has a history of baseball. His father, Ken Simonton II played in the Boston Red Sox farm system in 1975. His brother Benji Simonton spent eight seasons in the San Francisco Giants and Anaheim Angels organizations and his cousin Cy Simonton played three seasons in the Seattle Mariners organization. Simonton originally intended to play both baseball and football at Oregon State.

Simonton was a two-sport (football and baseball) star for the Pittsburg High School Pirates. As a sophomore, Simonton rushed for 1,135 yards in 10 games on 105 carries for an average of 10.8 yards per carry. In his junior year, he rushed for 785 yards in eight games on 47 carries for an average of 16.7 yards per carry. For his senior season, Simonton rushed for 960 yards on 92 carries for a 10.4 yard average and scored 23 touchdowns. Simonton was a three-time all-league selection as a running back and he was also named all-league as a defensive back in his senior year. He was a first-team All-Northern California selection, a first-team all-region selection by the Contra Costa Times and was named Offensive Player of the Year in the region by Sports Focus.

Simonton played outfield for the Pirates baseball team and was all-league as a sophomore, junior and senior. He was listed in Parade Magazine in 1996 as one of the top 100 college baseball prospects in the nation.

== College career ==
Simonton always wanted to attend University of Southern California and was recruited to come to the Trojans by assistant coach Mike Riley. That same Mike Riley was hired as the head coach of the Oregon State Beavers football program in 1997. Simonton chose to follow Riley to Oregon State instead of going to USC.

In his freshman season (1998), Simonton had 1,028 rushing yards, only the second time a freshman running back had rushed for over a 1,000 yards in the Pac-10. He became the first freshman to ever rush for over 100 yards in his first game for Oregon State and then the first freshman to have back-to-back 100-yard rushing games. Simonton finished fourth in the Pac-10 in rushing with an average of 93.5 yards per game and was fourth in scoring with 78 points and 7.1 average points per game. In the final game of the season, Simonton scored the winning touchdown in overtime as Oregon State upset archrival Oregon 44–41. The Beavers named him a co-winner of their Rookie of the Year award.

Simonton's sophomore season built upon the success of his freshman year. He set an OSU single-season scoring record with 118 points, single-season rushing record with 1,486 yards, and all-purpose running mark with 1,705 yards. For his success, he was named second-team All-Pac-10, first-team All-Pac-10 by the Seattle Post-Intelligencer, first-team All-Pac-10 by the Football News, honorable mention All-American by the Football News, and he was selected OSU's MVP of the Oahu Bowl vs. University of Hawaiʻi. He established a Beaver record by rushing for over 100 yards in five straight games.

Firmly entrenched as one of the premier tailbacks in the Pac-10, Simonton rushed for 1,559 yards in his junior season, again a school record at the time. His efforts earned him a spot on the first-team All-Pac-10 Conference and first-team All-American rosters as well as being named the College Football News Pac-10 Conference Player of the Year and finishing ninth on the Heisman Trophy Ballot. Simonton was chosen to serve as one of OSU's captains during the 2000 season, which concluded with a 41–9 victory over the University of Notre Dame in the 2001 Fiesta Bowl, an 11–1 record, a 4th-place ranking in the country.

After a 1st place pre-season ranking by Sports Illustrated and cover photo on the magazine, Simonton's senior season did not quite go as expected. There was a strong belief through Beaver Nation and in the Pac-10 that Simonton had a legitimate shot at the Heisman Trophy. With a 1,000 yard season, he would become only the fifth player in the NCAA (1st in the Pac-10) to have a 1,000 yards rushing in each of their four seasons. Simonton totaled 971 rushing yards on 239 carries with 8 touchdowns in his senior year, coming within 29 yards of his 4th consecutive 1,000 yard season. He left Oregon State with 5,044 rushing yards, which is still the school rushing record.

Simonton majored in liberal studies at Oregon State.

== Professional career ==
Simonton was undrafted in the 2002 NFL draft, mainly due to questions of his size and durability and how that would translate into an NFL running back. He signed a free agent contract with the San Francisco 49ers on April 26, 2002, but was released shortly thereafter.

Simonton next signed with the Buffalo Bills January 23, 2003. The Bills allocated him to the Scottish Claymores of NFL Europe on March 1, 2003. As a player for the Scottish Claymores, Simonton set a team record for rushing touchdowns in a season with 8. He was selected as the NFL Europe Offensive MVP after having a league-high 841 rushing yards as well as 39 receptions, which was 4th in league.

Feeling good from his success in NFL Europe and hoping for an increased role in the NFL, Simonton returned to Buffalo September 2, 2003. He hung on with the team for the season, getting minimal playing time. He was released September 9, 2004

Simonton was again signed by the San Francisco 49ers in November 2004 by former college coach Dennis Erickson. After signing with the Detroit Lions in early 2005, he chose to retire from the NFL on April 5, 2005.

Simonton signed with the Calgary Stampeders on May 5, 2007. He played in only one game, and was released on July 14, 2008.

== See also ==
- List of Division I FBS rushing touchdown leaders
