= 2000 NCAA Division I-A football season =

American college football season

2000 NCAA Division I-A season
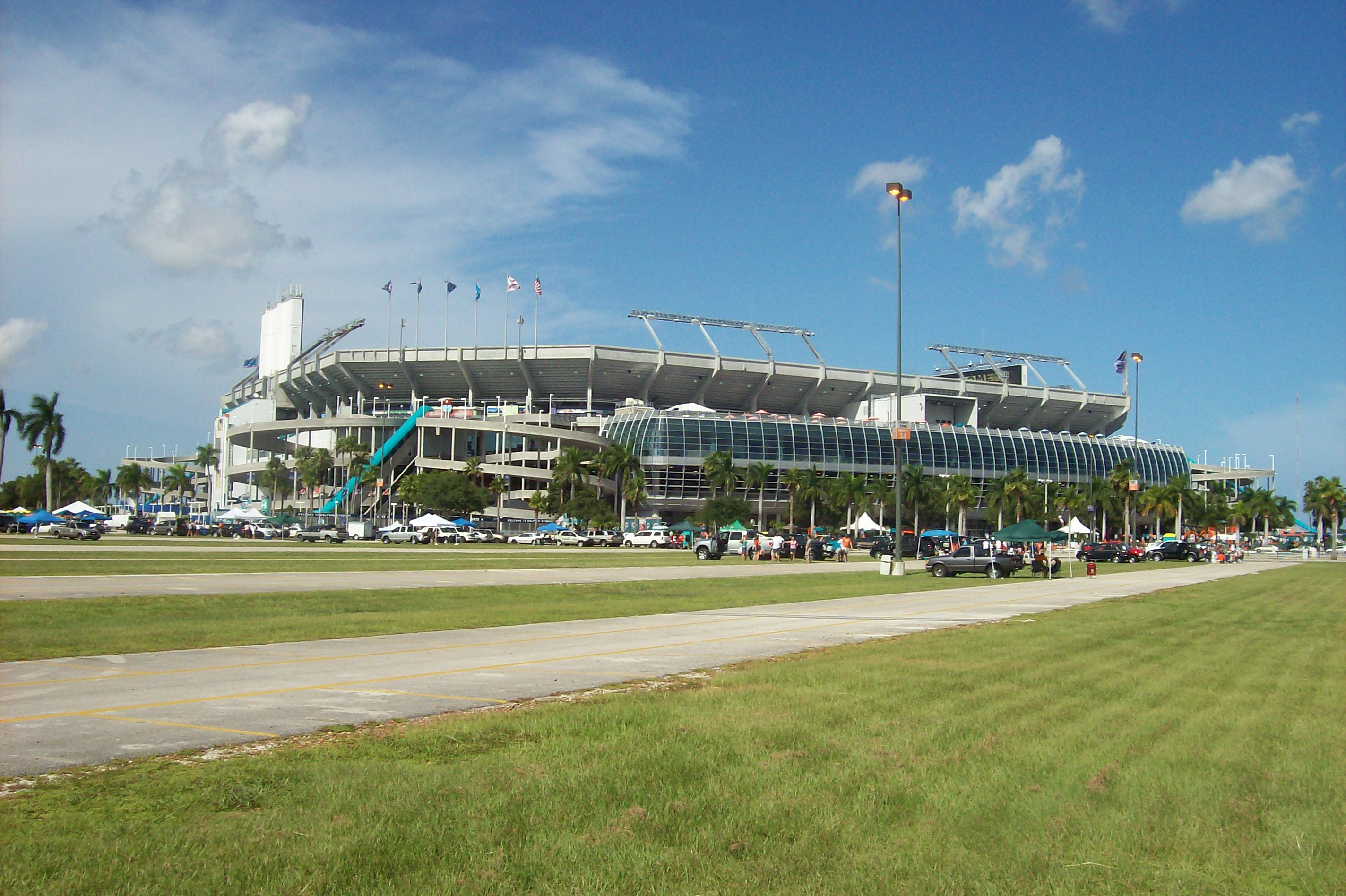
- Pro Player Stadium was the site of the national championship
- Number of teams: 116
- Preseason AP No. 1: Nebraska

Postseason
- Duration: December 20, 2000 – January 3, 2001
- Bowl games: 25
- Heisman Trophy: Chris Weinke (quarterback, Florida State

Bowl Championship Series
- 2001 Orange Bowl
- Site: Pro Player Stadium, Miami Gardens, Florida
- Champion(s): Oklahoma

Division I-A football seasons
- ← 1999 2001 →

The 2000 NCAA Division I-A football season ended with the Oklahoma Sooners beating the defending national champion Florida State Seminoles to claim the Sooners' seventh national championship and their thirty-seventh conference championship, the first of each since the 1988 departure of head coach Barry Switzer.

Oklahoma coach Bob Stoops was in his second season as head coach, having been the defensive coordinator of Steve Spurrier's 1996 National Champion Florida Gators, and also having helped Bill Snyder turn the Kansas State Wildcats around in the early 1990s. Stoops erased a three-game losing streak against rival Texas by a score of 63–14, one of the worst defeats in Texas' football history. Despite the lopsided victory, this game marked a return of the Red River Shootout to a rivalry game with national title implications.

The BCS title game, held at the Orange Bowl that year, was not without controversy, as the system shut fourth-ranked Washington out of the championship game, despite being the only team who had beaten each No. 2 Miami and No. 5 Oregon State and having the same 10–1 record as No. 3 Florida State during the regular season. 10–1 Miami, who handed No. 3 Florida State their only loss, was ranked higher in both the AP Writers' Poll and the ESPN/USA Today Coaches' Poll, and had the same record as the Seminoles, was also seen as a possible title contender.

Virginia Tech also was left out of the BCS bowls, despite being ranked higher than one of the at-large teams, Notre Dame.

The South Carolina Gamecocks broke a 21-game losing streak, stretching back into 1998, to go 8–4 including a win over Ohio State in the Outback Bowl.

Two new bowl games began in the 2000 season: the Silicon Valley Bowl, which had a contractual tie-in with the WAC, and the Galleryfurniture.com Bowl.

== Rules changes ==
The following rules changes were passed by the NCAA Rules Committee in 2000:

- The definition of an illegal block is expanded to include any high-low or low-high combination block by any two offensive players when the initial contact clearly occurs beyond the neutral zone.
- Crack-back blocks are now prohibited from any offensive player in motion in any direction (previously it was in motion toward the ball) and the restricted zone is now 10 yards beyond the neutral zone in all directions.
- Offensive teams in the process of substituting or simulated substituting are prohibited from rushing to the line of scrimmage to snap the ball to give the defense a disadvantage. The penalty for a first offense is five yards, additional violations are considered unsportsmanlike conduct (15 yards).
- Defensive players lined up within one yard of the line of scrimmage are prevented from rushing up to the line with the obvious intent of causing an offensive player to false start.
- Passers who are not within five yards of the sideline from the original position of the ball (aka the "tackle box") are allowed to throw the ball so it lands beyond the neutral zone without penalty.

== Conference and program changes ==
Two teams upgraded from Division I-AA, thus increasing the number of Division I-A schools from 114 to 116.

- Nevada left the Big West Conference to become the ninth member of the Western Athletic Conference.
- The University of Connecticut joined Division I-A football this season.

| School | 1999 Conference | 2000 Conference |
|---|---|---|
| Connecticut Huskies | I-AA Independent | I-A Independent |
| Nevada Wolf Pack | Big West | WAC |

== Regular season ==
=== August–September ===
Nebraska was voted No. 1 in the preseason AP Poll, followed by defending national champion Florida State at No. 2. Alabama and Wisconsin, last year’s winners of the SEC and Big Ten, were third and fourth, with Big East runner-up Miami at No. 5.

August 26: The only highly ranked team to play this week was No. 2 Florida State, who defeated Brigham Young 29-3 in the Pigskin Classic. The top five remained the same in the next AP Poll.

August 31-September 2: No. 1 Nebraska defeated San Jose State 49-13, and No. 2 Florida State was idle. No. 3 Alabama lost 35-24 at UCLA; the Crimson Tide turned out to be dramatically overrated to start the season, as they ended up finishing last in the SEC West with a 3-8 record. No. 4 Wisconsin beat Western Michigan 19-7, No. 5 Miami blasted McNeese State 61-14, and No. 6 Michigan won 42-7 over Bowling Green. The next poll featured No. 1 Nebraska, No. 2 Florida State, No. 3 Michigan, No. 4 Miami, and No. 5 Wisconsin.

September 9: No. 1 Nebraska held a 14-point second-half lead over No. 23 Notre Dame, but the Irish responded with a 100-yard kickoff return and an 83-yard punt return to force overtime. After a Notre Dame field goal, Eric Crouch ran for his third touchdown of the game to seal a 27-24 Cornhuskers win. No. 2 Florida State needed a fourth-quarter comeback of their own to beat Georgia Tech 26-21. No. 3 Michigan defeated Rice 38-7, but No. 4 Miami fell 34-29 at No. 15 Washington. Michael Bennett ran for 290 yards and led No. 5 Wisconsin to a 27-23 victory over Oregon, while No. 6 Texas overwhelmed Louisiana-Lafayette 52-10. The next poll featured No. 1 Nebraska, No. 2 Florida State, No. 3 Michigan, No. 4 Wisconsin, and No. 5 Texas.

September 16: No. 1 Nebraska was idle. No. 2 Florida State blew out North Carolina 63-14. No. 3 Michigan fell 23-20 to No. 14 UCLA, the Bruins’ second win in three weeks over a third-ranked team. With five starters suspended for receiving unauthorized shoe store discounts, No. 4 Wisconsin barely escaped Cincinnati in a 28-25 overtime win; the Badgers fell out of the top five in the next poll. No. 5 Texas lost 27-24 to Stanford when a late Cardinal touchdown drive erased a fourth-quarter Longhorns comeback. No. 6 Florida’s game against No. 11 Tennessee ended in controversy when a pass was knocked out of Gators receiver Jabar Gaffney’s hands in the end zone with time running out. The referees ruled that Gaffney had possession long enough for the touchdown to count, giving Florida a 27-23 win. No. 7 Kansas State shut out Ball State 76-0, and No. 8 Virginia Tech blanked Rutgers 49-0. The next poll featured No. 1 Nebraska, No. 2 Florida State, No. 3 Florida, No. 4 Kansas State, and No. 5 Virginia Tech.

September 23: No. 1 Nebraska defeated Iowa 42-13, No. 2 Florida State shut out Louisville 31-0, and No. 3 Florida beat Kentucky 59-31. No. 4 Kansas State won 55-10 over North Texas, but the Wildcats still switched places with idle No. 5 Virginia Tech in the next poll: No. 1 Nebraska, No. 2 Florida State, No. 3 Florida, No. 4 Virginia Tech, and No. 5 Kansas State.

September 28–30: No. 1 Nebraska beat Missouri 42-24, but the AP voters were more impressed by No. 2 Florida State’s 59-7 blowout of Maryland. No. 3 Florida accumulated 494 passing yards and negative 78 rushing yards in a 47-35 loss to Mississippi State. No. 4 Virginia Tech won 48-34 at Boston College, while No. 5 Kansas State was a 44-21 victor at Colorado. No. 7 Clemson beat Duke 52-22 to move up in the next AP Poll: No. 1 Florida State, No. 2 Nebraska, No. 3 Virginia Tech, No. 4 Kansas State, and No. 5 Clemson. Nebraska retained the top spot in the Coaches Poll.

=== October ===
October 7: No. 1 Florida State’s 27-24 loss to No. 7 Miami was a case of deja vu, as the Seminoles again missed a potential game-tying field goal at the end of a game with national championship implications. “Wide Right III” brought back memories of similar Florida State-Miami finishes in 1991 and 1992. No. 2 Nebraska won 49-27 at Iowa State, No. 3 Virginia Tech beat Temple 35-13, No. 4 Kansas State beat Kansas 52-13, and No. 5 Clemson held off North Carolina State 34-27. Nebraska returned to the No. 1 spot in both polls, and they were followed in the AP rankings by No. 2 Kansas State, No. 3 Virginia Tech, No. 4 Miami, and No. 5 Clemson.

October 12–14: No. 1 Nebraska dominated Texas Tech 56-3. No. 2 Kansas State fell 41-31 to No. 8 Oklahoma, whose head coach was former Wildcats assistant Bob Stoops. No. 3 Virginia Tech beat West Virginia 48-20, No. 4 Miami was idle, and No. 5 Clemson defeated Maryland 35-14. The next poll featured No. 1 Nebraska, No. 2 Virginia Tech, No. 3 Oklahoma, No. 4 Miami, and No. 5 Clemson.

October 21: No. 1 Nebraska shut out Baylor 59-0. No. 2 Virginia Tech spotted Syracuse a two-touchdown lead in the first quarter but came back to win 22-14. No. 3 Oklahoma was idle. No. 4 Miami won 45-17 at Temple, and No. 5 Clemson visited North Carolina for a 38-24 victory. The AP rankings remained the same, but the year’s first BCS rankings (which were released this weekend) had Oklahoma over Virginia Tech and Florida State in fifth place instead of Clemson.

October 28: No. 1 Nebraska visited No. 3 Oklahoma for what was expected to be a tight struggle. Instead, the game turned into a rout as the Sooners ran away with a 31-14 victory. No. 2 Virginia Tech lost star quarterback Michael Vick to an ankle injury and needed a last-minute field goal to escape Pittsburgh 37-34. No. 4 Miami, the Hokies’ Big East rival, looked sloppy in a 42-31 win over a 2-7 Louisiana Tech squad. No. 5 Clemson allowed an 80-yard game-ending touchdown drive and fell 31-28 to Georgia Tech. No. 6 Florida State won 58-14 at No. 21 North Carolina State. The next AP Poll featured No. 1 Oklahoma, No. 2 Virginia Tech, No. 3 Miami, No. 4 Florida State, and No. 5 Nebraska. The BCS standings were topped by the same five teams, but with Miami ranked fifth behind the Seminoles and Cornhuskers.

=== November–December ===
November 4: No. 1 Oklahoma blasted Baylor 56-7. With Michael Vick still hobbled by his injured ankle, No. 2 Virginia Tech was no match for No. 3 Miami. The Hokies’ 41-21 loss left Oklahoma as the only undefeated team in the nation. In a father vs. son coaching matchup, Bobby Bowden’s No. 4 Florida State crushed Tommy Bowden’s No. 10 Clemson 54-7. No. 5 Nebraska bounced back with a 56-17 victory over Kansas, and No. 6 Florida won 43-21 at Vanderbilt. The next AP Poll featured No. 1 Oklahoma, No. 2 Miami, No. 3 Florida State, No. 4 Nebraska, and No. 5 Florida, while the BCS continued to rate Florida State second and Miami third.

November 11: No. 1 Oklahoma trailed by 10 points in the fourth quarter, but an interception return for a touchdown allowed the Sooners to come back and beat No. 23 Texas A&M 35-31 before a Kyle Field record crowd of 87,188 fans. No. 2 Miami defeated Pittsburgh 35-7. No. 3 Florida State won 35-6 at Wake Forest. No. 4 Nebraska visited No. 16 Kansas State hoping to clinch a spot in the Big 12 title game. Instead, the Wildcats took over the division lead by winning a 29-28 nailbiter in a snowstorm. No. 5 Florida faced No. 21 South Carolina for the SEC East title, and the Gators won 41-21. No. 6 Oregon, the surprise first-place team of the Pac-10, beat California 25-17. The next AP Poll featured No. 1 Oklahoma, No. 2 Miami, No. 3 Florida State, No. 4 Florida, and No. 5 Oregon. The BCS had the same top four but picked Washington at No. 5, despite the Huskies’ early-season loss to the Ducks.

November 18: No. 1 Oklahoma clinched a spot in the Big 12 title game with a 27-13 victory over Texas Tech. No. 2 Miami shut out Syracuse 26-0. No. 3 Florida State overwhelmed No. 4 Florida 30-7. No. 5 Oregon and No. 8 Oregon State were both contenders for the Pac-10 title, and for the first time in 36 years the game between the two rivals would help decide the conference’s Rose Bowl representative. The Ducks had the opportunity to clinch the outright title, but Oregon quarterback Joey Harrington threw five interceptions in a 23-13 loss to the Beavers. No. 6 Washington blew out Washington State 51-3 to climb into a three-way tie for the conference lead, and the Huskies (who had beaten Oregon State in October) earned a trip to Pasadena. The next AP Poll featured No. 1 Oklahoma, No. 2 Miami, No. 3 Florida State, No. 4 Washington, and No. 5 Oregon State. However, the BCS was impressed enough with Florida State’s victory over Florida that the Seminoles were elevated back above the Hurricanes into the number-two spot.

November 25: Undefeated No. 1 Oklahoma had a tough time with 3-7 Oklahoma State, but the Sooners finally pulled out a 12-7 victory. No. 2 Miami beat Boston College 52-6. No. 3 Florida State, No. 4 Washington, and No. 5 Oregon State had all finished their seasons, and the next AP Poll remained the same.

December 2: No. 1 Oklahoma faced No. 8 Kansas State in the Big 12 Championship Game, hoping to preserve their undefeated record and earn a spot in the national title game. The game was tied at 17 going into the fourth quarter, but the Sooners scored a touchdown and kicked a 46-yard field goal to go ahead for good. After Kansas State cut the score to 27-24 with six seconds left, Oklahoma recovered the onside kick to salt away the win.

Undefeated No. 1 Oklahoma was guaranteed a spot in the Orange Bowl to play for the national championship, but the BCS caused a controversy by selecting AP No. 3 Florida State rather than No. 2 Miami or No. 4 Washington as the Sooners’ opponent. All three teams had been defeated only once, but Florida State’s loss was to Miami whose loss was to Washington. Miami would go to the Sugar Bowl against No. 7 Florida (who had easily beaten No. 18 Auburn in the SEC Championship Game), while Washington would play No. 14 Purdue in the Rose Bowl’s Pac-10 vs. Big Ten matchup. The BCS bowls were rounded out by two at-large teams, No. 5 Oregon State and No. 10 Notre Dame, who would meet in the Fiesta Bowl.

== Regular season top 10 matchups ==
Rankings reflect the AP Poll. Rankings for Week 9 and beyond will list BCS Rankings first and AP Poll second. Teams that failed to be a top 10 team for one poll or the other will be noted.

- Week 6
  - No. 7 Miami defeated No. 1 Florida State, 27–24 (Miami Orange Bowl, Miami, Florida)
- Week 7
  - No. 8 Oklahoma defeated No. 2 Kansas State, 41–31 (KSU Stadium, Manhattan, Kansas)
- Week 9
  - No. 2/3 Oklahoma defeated No. 1/1 Nebraska, 31–14 (Oklahoma Memorial Stadium, Norman, Oklahoma)
- Week 10
  - No. 3/4 Florida State defeated No. 13/10 Clemson, 54–7 (Doak Campbell Stadium, Tallahassee, Florida)
  - No. 5/3 Miami defeated No. 2/2 Virginia Tech, 41–21 (Miami Orange Bowl, Miami, Florida)
- Week 12
  - No. 3/3 Florida State defeated No. 4/4 Florida, 30–7 (Doak Campbell Stadium, Tallahassee, Florida)
  - No. 9/8 Oregon State defeated No. 7/5 Oregon, 23–13 (Reser Stadium, Corvallis, Oregon)
- Week 14
  - No. 1/1 Oklahoma defeated No. 9/8 Kansas State, 27–24 (2000 Big 12 Championship Game, Arrowhead Stadium, Kansas City, Missouri)

== Conference standings ==
2000 Atlantic Coast Conference football standings
| | Conf. | | | Overall |
| Team | W | | L | W | | L |
|---|---|---|---|---|---|---|
| No. 5 Florida State $ | 8 | – | 0 | 11 | – | 2 |
| No. 17 Georgia Tech | 6 | – | 2 | 9 | – | 3 |
| No. 16 Clemson | 6 | – | 2 | 9 | – | 3 |
| Virginia | 5 | – | 3 | 6 | – | 6 |
| NC State | 4 | – | 4 | 8 | – | 4 |
| North Carolina | 3 | – | 5 | 6 | – | 5 |
| Maryland | 3 | – | 5 | 5 | – | 6 |
| Wake Forest | 1 | – | 7 | 2 | – | 9 |
| Duke | 0 | – | 8 | 0 | – | 11 |
$ – BCS representative as conference champion; Rankings from AP Poll

2000 Big 12 Conference football standings
| | Conf. | | | Overall |
| Team | W | | L | W | | L |
|---|---|---|---|---|---|---|
North Division
| No. 9 Kansas State xy | 6 | – | 2 | 11 | – | 3 |
| No. 8 Nebraska x | 6 | – | 2 | 10 | – | 2 |
| No. 25 Iowa State | 5 | – | 3 | 9 | – | 3 |
| Colorado | 3 | – | 5 | 3 | – | 8 |
| Kansas | 2 | – | 6 | 4 | – | 7 |
| Missouri | 2 | – | 6 | 3 | – | 8 |
South Division
| No. 1 Oklahoma x$# | 8 | – | 0 | 13 | – | 0 |
| No. 12 Texas | 7 | – | 1 | 9 | – | 3 |
| Texas A&M | 5 | – | 3 | 7 | – | 5 |
| Texas Tech | 3 | – | 5 | 7 | – | 6 |
| Oklahoma State | 1 | – | 7 | 3 | – | 8 |
| Baylor | 0 | – | 8 | 2 | – | 9 |
Championship: Oklahoma 27, Kansas State 24
# – BCS National Champion; $ – BCS representative as conference champion; x – Division champion/co-champions; y – Championship game participant; Rankings from AP Poll

2000 Big East Conference football standings
| | Conf. | | | Overall |
| Team | W | | L | W | | L |
|---|---|---|---|---|---|---|
| No. 2 Miami (FL) $ | 7 | – | 0 | 11 | – | 1 |
| No. 6 Virginia Tech | 6 | – | 1 | 11 | – | 1 |
| Pittsburgh | 4 | – | 3 | 7 | – | 5 |
| Syracuse | 4 | – | 3 | 6 | – | 5 |
| Boston College | 3 | – | 4 | 7 | – | 5 |
| West Virginia | 3 | – | 4 | 7 | – | 5 |
| Temple | 1 | – | 6 | 4 | – | 7 |
| Rutgers | 0 | – | 7 | 3 | – | 8 |
$ – BCS representative as conference champion; Rankings from AP Poll

2000 Big Ten Conference football standings
| | Conf. | | | Overall |
| Team | W | | L | W | | L |
|---|---|---|---|---|---|---|
| No. 11 Michigan + | 6 | – | 2 | 9 | – | 3 |
| Northwestern + | 6 | – | 2 | 8 | – | 4 |
| No. 13 Purdue $+ | 6 | – | 2 | 8 | – | 4 |
| Ohio State | 5 | – | 3 | 8 | – | 4 |
| No. 23 Wisconsin | 4 | – | 4 | 9 | – | 4 |
| Minnesota | 4 | – | 4 | 6 | – | 6 |
| Penn State | 4 | – | 4 | 5 | – | 7 |
| Iowa | 3 | – | 5 | 3 | – | 9 |
| Illinois | 2 | – | 6 | 5 | – | 6 |
| Michigan State | 2 | – | 6 | 5 | – | 6 |
| Indiana | 2 | – | 6 | 3 | – | 8 |
$ – BCS representative as conference champion; + – Conference co-champions; Rankings from AP Poll

2000 Big West Conference football standings
| | Conf. | | | Overall |
| Team | W | | L | W | | L |
|---|---|---|---|---|---|---|
| Boise State $ | 5 | – | 0 | 10 | – | 2 |
| Utah State | 4 | – | 1 | 5 | – | 6 |
| Idaho | 3 | – | 2 | 5 | – | 6 |
| New Mexico State | 1 | – | 4 | 3 | – | 8 |
| North Texas | 1 | – | 4 | 3 | – | 8 |
| Arkansas State | 1 | – | 4 | 1 | – | 10 |
$ – Conference champion

2000 Conference USA football standings
| | Conf. | | | Overall |
| Team | W | | L | W | | L |
|---|---|---|---|---|---|---|
| Louisville $ | 6 | – | 1 | 9 | – | 3 |
| East Carolina | 5 | – | 2 | 8 | – | 4 |
| Cincinnati | 5 | – | 2 | 7 | – | 5 |
| Southern Miss | 4 | – | 3 | 8 | – | 4 |
| UAB | 3 | – | 3 | 7 | – | 4 |
| Tulane | 3 | – | 4 | 6 | – | 5 |
| Memphis | 2 | – | 5 | 4 | – | 7 |
| Houston | 2 | – | 5 | 3 | – | 8 |
| Army | 1 | – | 6 | 1 | – | 10 |
$ – Conference champion; Rankings from AP Poll

2000 Mid-American Conference football standings
| | Div | | | Conf. | | | Overall |
| Team | W | | L | W | | L | W | | L |
|---|---|---|---|---|---|---|---|---|---|
East Division
| Marshall xy$ | 5 | – | 1 | 5 | – | 3 | 8 | – | 5 |
| Akron x | 5 | – | 1 | 5 | – | 3 | 6 | – | 5 |
| Ohio | 4 | – | 2 | 5 | – | 3 | 7 | – | 4 |
| Miami (OH) | 4 | – | 2 | 5 | – | 3 | 6 | – | 5 |
| Bowling Green | 1 | – | 5 | 2 | – | 6 | 2 | – | 9 |
| Buffalo | 2 | – | 4 | 2 | – | 6 | 2 | – | 9 |
| Kent State | 0 | – | 6 | 1 | – | 7 | 1 | – | 10 |
West Division
| Western Michigan xy | 4 | – | 1 | 7 | – | 1 | 9 | – | 3 |
| Toledo x | 4 | – | 1 | 6 | – | 1 | 10 | – | 1 |
| Northern Illinois | 2 | – | 3 | 4 | – | 3 | 6 | – | 5 |
| Ball State | 2 | – | 3 | 4 | – | 3 | 5 | – | 6 |
| Eastern Michigan | 2 | – | 3 | 2 | – | 5 | 3 | – | 8 |
| Central Michigan | 1 | – | 4 | 2 | – | 6 | 2 | – | 9 |
Championship: Marshall 19, Western Michigan 14
$ – Conference champion; x – Division champion/co-champions; y – Championship game participant; Due to an unbalanced conference schedule, the team with best division record within each division was awarded that division's championship game berth.

2000 Mountain West Conference football standings
| | Conf. | | | Overall |
| Team | W | | L | W | | L |
|---|---|---|---|---|---|---|
| No. 14 Colorado State $ | 6 | – | 1 | 10 | – | 2 |
| Air Force | 5 | – | 2 | 9 | – | 3 |
| UNLV | 4 | – | 3 | 8 | – | 5 |
| BYU | 4 | – | 3 | 6 | – | 6 |
| New Mexico | 3 | – | 4 | 5 | – | 7 |
| Utah | 3 | – | 4 | 4 | – | 7 |
| San Diego State | 3 | – | 4 | 3 | – | 8 |
| Wyoming | 0 | – | 7 | 1 | – | 10 |
$ – Conference champion; Rankings from AP Poll

2000 Pacific-10 Conference football standings
| | Conf. | | | Overall |
| Team | W | | L | W | | L |
|---|---|---|---|---|---|---|
| No. 4 Oregon State %+ | 7 | – | 1 | 11 | – | 1 |
| No. 3 Washington $+ | 7 | – | 1 | 11 | – | 1 |
| No. 7 Oregon + | 7 | – | 1 | 10 | – | 2 |
| Stanford | 4 | – | 4 | 5 | – | 6 |
| UCLA | 3 | – | 5 | 6 | – | 6 |
| Arizona State | 3 | – | 5 | 6 | – | 6 |
| Arizona | 3 | – | 5 | 5 | – | 6 |
| USC | 2 | – | 6 | 5 | – | 7 |
| Washington State | 2 | – | 6 | 4 | – | 7 |
| California | 2 | – | 6 | 3 | – | 8 |
$ – BCS representative as conference champion; % – BCS at-large representative; + – Conference co-champions; Rankings from AP Poll

2000 Southeastern Conference football standings
| | Conf. | | | Overall |
| Team | W | | L | W | | L |
|---|---|---|---|---|---|---|
Eastern Division
| No. 10 Florida x$ | 7 | – | 1 | 10 | – | 3 |
| No. 19 South Carolina | 5 | – | 3 | 8 | – | 4 |
| No. 20 Georgia | 5 | – | 3 | 8 | – | 4 |
| Tennessee | 5 | – | 3 | 8 | – | 4 |
| Vanderbilt | 1 | – | 7 | 3 | – | 8 |
| Kentucky | 0 | – | 8 | 2 | – | 9 |
Western Division
| No. 18 Auburn x | 6 | – | 2 | 9 | – | 4 |
| No. 22 LSU | 5 | – | 3 | 8 | – | 4 |
| Ole Miss | 4 | – | 4 | 7 | – | 5 |
| No. 24 Mississippi State | 4 | – | 4 | 8 | – | 4 |
| Arkansas | 3 | – | 5 | 6 | – | 6 |
| Alabama | 3 | – | 5 | 3 | – | 8 |
Championship: Florida 28, Auburn 6
$ – BCS representative as conference champion; x – Division champion/co-champions; Rankings from AP Poll

2000 Western Athletic Conference football standings
| | Conf. | | | Overall |
| Team | W | | L | W | | L |
|---|---|---|---|---|---|---|
| No. 21 TCU + | 7 | – | 1 | 10 | – | 2 |
| UTEP + | 7 | – | 1 | 8 | – | 4 |
| Fresno State | 6 | – | 2 | 7 | – | 5 |
| San Jose State | 5 | – | 3 | 7 | – | 5 |
| Tulsa | 4 | – | 4 | 5 | – | 7 |
| Rice | 2 | – | 6 | 3 | – | 8 |
| Hawaii | 2 | – | 6 | 3 | – | 9 |
| SMU | 2 | – | 6 | 3 | – | 9 |
| Nevada | 1 | – | 7 | 2 | – | 10 |
+ – Conference co-champions; Rankings from AP Poll

2000 NCAA Division I-A independents football records
| | Conf. | | | Overall |
| Team | W | | L | W | | L |
|---|---|---|---|---|---|---|
| No. 15 Notre Dame % | | – | | 9 | – | 3 |
| UCF | | – | | 7 | – | 4 |
| Middle Tennessee | | – | | 6 | – | 5 |
| Connecticut | | – | | 3 | – | 8 |
| Louisiana Tech | | – | | 3 | – | 9 |
| Louisiana–Lafayette | | – | | 1 | – | 10 |
| Louisiana–Monroe | | – | | 1 | – | 10 |
| Navy | | – | | 1 | – | 10 |
% – BCS at-large representative; Rankings from AP Poll

== I-AA team wins over I-A teams ==
Italics denotes I-AA teams.

| Date | Visiting team | Home team | Site | Result | Attendance | Ref. |
|---|---|---|---|---|---|---|
| August 31 | No. 6 (I-AA) Appalachian State | Wake Forest | Groves Stadium • Winston-Salem, North Carolina | 20–16 | 26,853 | |
| September 2 | Sam Houston State | UL Lafayette | Cajun Field • Lafayette, Louisiana | 21–14 | 15,728 | |
| September 9 | No. 10 (I-AA) Montana | Idaho | Martin Stadium • Pullman, Washington (Little Brown Stein) | 45–38 | 17,929 | |
| September 9 | No. 12 (I-AA) Portland State | Hawaii | Aloha Stadium • Hālawa, Hawaii | 45–20 | 50,000 | |
| September 9 | No. 25 (I-AA) Western Illinois | Ball State | Ball State Stadium • Muncie, Indiana | 24–14 | 12,779 | |
| September 16 | Stephen F. Austin | Louisiana Tech | Joe Aillet Stadium • Ruston, Louisiana | 34–31 ^{2OT} | 17,320 | |
| September 16 | Youngstown State | Kent State | Dix Stadium • Kent, Ohio | 26–20 | 13,642 | |
| September 23 | Northeastern | Connecticut | Memorial Stadium • Storrs, Connecticut | 35–27 | 16,549 | |
| September 23 | Northwestern State | UL Lafayette | Cajun Field • Lafayette, Louisiana | 23–21 | 15,212 | |
| September 30 | No. 19 (I-AA) Richmond | Arkansas State | Indian Stadium • Jonesboro, Arkansas | 30–27 | 13,116 | |
| September 30 | Southwest Texas State | UL Monroe | Malone Stadium • Monroe, Louisiana | 27–7 | 8,178 | |
| November 11 | Jacksonville State | UL Lafayette | Cajun Field • Lafayette, Louisiana | 28–14 | 8,595 | |
| November 11 | Rhode Island | Connecticut | Memorial Stadium • Storrs, Connecticut (rivalry) | 26–21 | 9,951 | |
| November 18 | Idaho State | Utah State | Romney Stadium • Logan, Utah | 27–24 | 13,877 | |
| November 18 | Wofford | UL Monroe | Malone Stadium • Monroe, Louisiana | 24–6 | 4,208 | |
^{#}Rankings from AP Poll released prior to game.

== Bowl games ==
=== BCS bowls ===
- Orange Bowl: No. 1 Oklahoma (BCS No. 1) 13, No. 3 Florida State (BCS No. 2) 2
- Rose Bowl: No. 4 Washington (Pac 10 co-champ) 34, No. 14 Purdue (Big Ten co-Champ) 24
- Fiesta Bowl: No. 5 Oregon State (At Large [Pac 10 co-champ]) 41, No. 10 Notre Dame (At Large) 9
- Sugar Bowl: No. 2 Miami (Big East Champ) 37, No. 7 Florida (SEC Champ) 20

=== Other New Year's Day bowls ===
- Cotton Bowl Classic: No. 11 Kansas State (Big 12 runner-up) 35, No. 21 Tennessee 21
- Florida Citrus Bowl: No. 17 Michigan (Big Ten co-champ) 31, No. 20 Auburn (SEC runner-up) 28
- Gator Bowl: No. 6 Virginia Tech 41, No. 16 Clemson 20
- Outback Bowl: South Carolina 24, No. 19 Ohio State 7

=== December bowl games ===
- Holiday Bowl: No. 8 Oregon (Pac 10 co-champ) 35, No. 12 Texas 30
- Peach Bowl: LSU 28, No. 15 Georgia Tech 14
- MicronPC.com Bowl: NC State 38, Minnesota 30
- Sun Bowl: Wisconsin 21, UCLA 20
- Alamo Bowl: No. 9 Nebraska 66, No. 18 Northwestern (Big Ten co-champ) 17
- Insight.com Bowl: Iowa State 37, Pittsburgh 29
- Liberty Bowl: No. 23 Colorado State (MWC champ) 22, No. 22 Louisville (C-USA champ) 17
- Aloha Bowl: Boston College 31, Arizona State 17
- Oahu Bowl: No. 24 Georgia 37, Virginia 14
- Independence Bowl: Mississippi State 43, Texas A&M 41 (OT)
- Music City Bowl: West Virginia 49, Mississippi 38
- Las Vegas Bowl: UNLV 31, Arkansas 14
- Motor City Bowl: Marshall (MAC champ) 25, Cincinnati 14
- Humanitarian Bowl: Boise State (Big West champ) 38, UTEP (WAC co-champ) 23
- Mobile Alabama Bowl: Southern Miss 28, No. 13 TCU (WAC co-champ) 21
- Silicon Valley Classic: Air Force 37, Fresno State 34
- Galleryfurniture.com bowl: East Carolina 40, Texas Tech 27

== Heisman Trophy voting ==
The Heisman Trophy is given to the year's most outstanding player

| Player | School | Position | 1st | 2nd | 3rd | Total |
|---|---|---|---|---|---|---|
| Chris Weinke | Florida State | QB | 369 | 216 | 89 | 1,628 |
| Josh Heupel | Oklahoma | QB | 286 | 290 | 114 | 1,552 |
| Drew Brees | Purdue | QB | 69 | 107 | 198 | 619 |
| LaDainian Tomlinson | TCU | RB | 47 | 110 | 205 | 566 |
| Damien Anderson | Northwestern | RB | 6 | 20 | 43 | 101 |
| Michael Vick | Virginia Tech | QB | 7 | 14 | 34 | 83 |
| Santana Moss | Miami (FL) | WR | 3 | 9 | 28 | 55 |
| Marques Tuiasosopo | Washington | QB | 5 | 8 | 10 | 41 |
| Ken Simonton | Oregon State | RB | 1 | 5 | 12 | 25 |
| Rudi Johnson | Auburn | RB | 3 | 1 | 9 | 20 |

== Other major awards ==
- Maxwell Award (College Player of the Year) – Drew Brees, Purdue
- Walter Camp Award (Back) – Josh Heupel, Oklahoma
- Davey O'Brien Award (Quarterback) – Chris Weinke, Florida State
- Johnny Unitas Golden Arm Award (Senior quarterback) – Chris Weinke, Florida State
- Doak Walker Award (Running back) – LaDainian Tomlinson, TCU
- Fred Biletnikoff Award (Wide receiver) – Antonio Bryant, Pittsburgh
- Bronko Nagurski Trophy (Defensive player) – Dan Morgan, Miami
- Chuck Bednarik Award – Dan Morgan, Miami
- Dick Butkus Award (Linebacker) – Dan Morgan, Miami
- Lombardi Award (Lineman or Linebacker) – Jamal Reynolds, Florida State
- Outland Trophy (Interior lineman) – John Henderson, Tennessee, DT
- Jim Thorpe Award (Defensive back) – Jamar Fletcher, Wisconsin
- Lou Groza Award (Placekicker) – Jonathan Ruffin, Cincinnati
- Paul "Bear" Bryant Award – Bob Stoops, Oklahoma

== Attendances ==
| # | Team | Games | Total | Average |
|---|---|---|---|---|
| 1 | Michigan | 6 | 664,930 | 110,822 |
| 2 | Tennessee | 6 | 645,567 | 107,595 |
| 3 | Ohio State | 6 | 586,542 | 97,757 |
| 4 | Penn State | 6 | 573,256 | 95,543 |
| 5 | LSU | 7 | 614,704 | 87,815 |
| 6 | Florida | 6 | 511,518 | 85,253 |
| 7 | Georgia | 6 | 506,922 | 84,487 |
| 8 | Alabama | 6 | 502,622 | 83,770 |
| 9 | Texas | 6 | 493,297 | 82,216 |
| 10 | Auburn | 6 | 491,433 | 81,906 |
| 11 | South Carolina | 6 | 491,425 | 81,904 |
| 12 | Florida State | 6 | 484,985 | 80,831 |
| 13 | Notre Dame | 6 | 481,813 | 80,302 |
| 14 | Wisconsin | 7 | 550,974 | 78,711 |
| 15 | Clemson | 7 | 548,647 | 78,378 |
| 16 | Nebraska | 6 | 467,269 | 77,878 |
| 17 | Texas A&M | 6 | 465,471 | 77,579 |
| 18 | Oklahoma | 6 | 450,449 | 75,075 |
| 19 | Michigan State | 6 | 444,138 | 74,023 |
| 20 | Washington | 6 | 429,829 | 71,638 |
| 21 | UCLA | 7 | 470,961 | 67,280 |
| 22 | Kentucky | 6 | 392,772 | 65,462 |
| 23 | Purdue | 6 | 384,937 | 64,156 |
| 24 | Iowa | 6 | 366,737 | 61,123 |
| 25 | BYU | 6 | 363,711 | 60,619 |
| 26 | Miami Hurricanes | 6 | 350,578 | 58,430 |
| 27 | Southern California | 7 | 401,371 | 57,339 |
| 28 | Virginia | 6 | 337,623 | 56,271 |
| 29 | Illinois | 6 | 335,866 | 55,978 |
| 30 | Missouri | 6 | 321,600 | 53,600 |
| 31 | Virginia Tech | 6 | 317,154 | 52,859 |
| 32 | West Virginia | 7 | 363,948 | 51,993 |
| 33 | Arkansas | 4 | 203,238 | 50,810 |
| 34 | Arizona State | 6 | 303,671 | 50,612 |
| 35 | North Carolina | 6 | 303,000 | 50,500 |
| 36 | Kansas State | 7 | 351,820 | 50,260 |
| 37 | Colorado | 5 | 249,950 | 49,990 |
| 38 | Arizona | 6 | 291,288 | 48,548 |
| 39 | Mississippi | 7 | 336,322 | 48,046 |
| 40 | Minnesota | 6 | 284,112 | 47,352 |
| 41 | North Carolina State | 6 | 280,489 | 46,748 |
| 42 | California | 5 | 230,500 | 46,100 |
| 43 | Oregon | 6 | 270,559 | 45,093 |
| 44 | UTEP | 5 | 223,577 | 44,715 |
| 45 | Syracuse | 6 | 258,370 | 43,062 |
| 46 | Mississippi State | 5 | 214,790 | 42,958 |
| 47 | Georgia Tech | 6 | 256,028 | 42,671 |
| 48 | Air Force | 6 | 255,357 | 42,560 |
| 49 | Texas Tech | 8 | 337,723 | 42,215 |
| 50 | Iowa State | 6 | 252,122 | 42,020 |
| 51 | Pittsburgh | 6 | 245,208 | 40,868 |
| 52 | Fresno State | 5 | 202,205 | 40,441 |
| 53 | Oklahoma State | 6 | 238,875 | 39,813 |
| 54 | Louisville | 7 | 278,136 | 39,734 |
| 55 | Boston College | 6 | 235,962 | 39,327 |
| 56 | Vanderbilt | 6 | 232,464 | 38,744 |
| 57 | Utah | 6 | 231,225 | 38,538 |
| 58 | Army | 5 | 192,580 | 38,516 |
| 59 | Stanford | 6 | 227,880 | 37,980 |
| 60 | Hawaii | 8 | 292,548 | 36,569 |
| 61 | East Carolina | 6 | 217,742 | 36,290 |
| 62 | Maryland | 6 | 204,775 | 34,129 |
| 63 | Oregon State | 6 | 201,896 | 33,649 |
| 64 | Northwestern | 6 | 200,986 | 33,498 |
| 65 | Indiana | 6 | 198,675 | 33,113 |
| 66 | TCU | 6 | 195,805 | 32,634 |
| 67 | Kansas | 6 | 193,300 | 32,217 |
| 68 | Memphis | 6 | 181,720 | 30,287 |
| 69 | Navy | 5 | 146,645 | 29,329 |
| 70 | Baylor | 6 | 173,462 | 28,910 |
| 71 | Southern Miss | 4 | 114,036 | 28,509 |
| 72 | Marshall | 5 | 142,488 | 28,498 |
| 73 | Colorado State | 5 | 137,662 | 27,532 |
| 74 | Central Florida | 5 | 136,393 | 27,279 |
| 75 | Toledo | 6 | 161,304 | 26,884 |
| 76 | Washington State | 6 | 159,854 | 26,642 |
| 77 | Boise State | 5 | 132,463 | 26,493 |
| 78 | Western Michigan | 5 | 125,214 | 25,043 |
| 79 | Rutgers | 6 | 147,338 | 24,556 |
| 80 | San Diego State | 5 | 116,704 | 23,341 |
| 81 | New Mexico | 6 | 137,064 | 22,844 |
| 82 | Duke | 5 | 110,578 | 22,116 |
| 83 | SMU | 6 | 130,888 | 21,815 |
| 84 | Wake Forest | 6 | 127,691 | 21,282 |
| 85 | Cincinnati | 6 | 125,712 | 20,952 |
| 86 | Tulane | 5 | 104,226 | 20,845 |
| 87 | UNLV | 5 | 103,491 | 20,698 |
| 88 | Central Michigan | 5 | 100,583 | 20,117 |
| 89 | Utah State | 5 | 99,549 | 19,910 |
| 90 | Ohio | 5 | 99,253 | 19,851 |
| 91 | Tulsa | 6 | 116,776 | 19,463 |
| 92 | Rice | 5 | 95,885 | 19,177 |
| 93 | Temple | 6 | 111,672 | 18,612 |
| 94 | UAB | 6 | 111,000 | 18,500 |
| 95 | Nevada | 5 | 85,086 | 17,017 |
| 96 | Idaho | 4 | 67,412 | 16,853 |
| 97 | Louisiana Tech | 4 | 66,542 | 16,636 |
| 98 | Miami RedHawks | 4 | 64,638 | 16,160 |
| 99 | New Mexico State | 5 | 79,130 | 15,826 |
| 100 | Houston | 4 | 63,179 | 15,795 |
| 101 | Wyoming | 5 | 74,112 | 14,822 |
| 102 | Ball State | 5 | 73,962 | 14,792 |
| 103 | Louisiana-Lafayette | 5 | 73,119 | 14,624 |
| 104 | North Texas | 5 | 70,900 | 14,180 |
| 105 | Northern Illinois | 5 | 60,901 | 12,180 |
| 106 | San Jose State | 5 | 60,514 | 12,103 |
| 107 | Arkansas State | 5 | 54,784 | 10,957 |
| 108 | Akron | 6 | 63,823 | 10,637 |
| 109 | Middle Tennessee State | 5 | 51,116 | 10,223 |
| 110 | Eastern Michigan | 6 | 60,163 | 10,027 |
| 111 | Louisiana-Monroe | 5 | 49,130 | 9,826 |
| 112 | Buffalo | 5 | 48,825 | 9,765 |
| 113 | Bowling Green | 5 | 42,320 | 8,464 |
| 114 | Kent State | 5 | 37,338 | 7,468 |
