= Daryl Daye =

American football player and coach (born 1963)

Biographical details
- Born: February 1, 1963 (age 63)

Playing career
- 1982–1985: LSU
- Position: Linebacker

Coaching career (HC unless noted)
- 1986–1988: LSU (GA)
- 1989–1990: Southern Miss (GA)
- 1991–1998: Liberty (DC/DL)
- 1999–2003: Nicholls State
- 2004–2005: Southern (ST)
- 2006–2009: Missouri Southern (DC)
- 2010–2011: Buffalo Bills (assistant to HC)
- 2012–2014: Missouri Southern
- 2015: Northwestern State (DC)
- 2017–2019: East Tennessee State (DL)

Head coaching record
- Overall: 30–57

Accomplishments and honors

Awards
- Southland Coach of the Year (2002)

Daryl Daye (born February 1, 1963) is an American former football coach . He served as the head football coach at Nicholls State University from 1999 to 2003 and Missouri Southern State University from 2012 to 2014.

== Head coaching career ==
Daye served as head coach at Nicholls State University from 1999 to 2003, and compiled a record of 17 wins and 38 losses. At Nicholls State, he was named Southland Conference Coach of the Year in 2002.

From 2012 until 2014, Daye was head football coach at Missouri Southern State University and compiled a record of 17 wins and 15 losses.

== Assistant coaching career ==
Daye has been an assistant coach at LSU (graduate assistant) from 1986 to 1988, the University of Southern Mississippi (graduate assistant) from 1989 to 1990, Liberty University (defensive line coach and defensive coordinator) from 1991 to 1998, Southern University (special teams coach) from 2004 to 2005 and Missouri Southern State University (defensive coordinator) from 2006 to 2009. He spent two years in the National Football League (NFL) as an assistant to Buffalo Bills head coach Chan Gailey from 2010 to 2011. Daye was also defensive coordinator at Northwestern State in 2015.

== Playing career ==
Daye is an alumnus of Louisiana State University (LSU), where he played football.

== Head coaching record ==
Year	Team	Overall	Conference	Standing	Bowl/playoffs
Nicholls State Colonels (Southland Conference) (1999–2003)
1999	Nicholls State	1–10	1–6	T–7th	
2000	Nicholls State	2–9 (Note: Nicholls State finished the 2000 season with an overall record of 1–10 and a mark of 0–7 in conference, placing last out of eight teams in the Southland Conference In the spring of 2001, Northwestern State forfeited two wins from the 2000 season, over Nicholls State and Troy State, because an ineligible player had participated for the Demons in those games. With the forfeit, the Colonels' record improved to 2–9 overall and 1–6 in conference play, moving Troy State into a tie with Northwestern State for seventh place in the Southland standings.)	1–6	T–7th	
2001	Nicholls State	3–8	1–6	6th	
2002	Nicholls State	7–4	3–3	T–3rd	
2003	Nicholls State	0–11 (Note: Nicholls State finished the 2003 season with an overall record of 5–6 and a mark of 3–2 in conference play, placing third in the Southland Conference. In 2005, Nicholls State forfeited five victories, including three conference wins, from the 2003 season because an ineligible player had participated in those games. With the forfeits, the Colonels' record dropped to 0–11 overall and 0–5 in conference play, placing them last out of six teams in the Southland.)	0–5	6th	
Nicholls State:		13–42	6–26		
Missouri Southern Lions (Mid-America Intercollegiate Athletics Association) (2012–2014)
2012	Missouri Southern	6–5	5–5	8th	
2013	Missouri Southern	7–3	5–3	6th	
2014	Missouri Southern	4–7	4–7	T–7th	
Missouri Southern:		17–15	14–15		
Total:		30–57			
