= 2000 Notre Dame Fighting Irish football team =

American college football season

2000 Notre Dame Fighting Irish football

Fiesta Bowl, L 9–41 vs. Oregon State
- Conference: Independent

Ranking
- Coaches: No. 16
- AP: No. 15
- Record: 9–3
- Head coach: Bob Davie (4th season)
- Offensive coordinator: Kevin Rogers (2nd season)
- Offensive scheme: Option
- Defensive coordinator: Greg Mattison (4th season)
- Base defense: 4–3
- Captains: Anthony Denman; Jabari Holloway; Grant Irons; Dan O'Leary
- Home stadium: Notre Dame Stadium

2000 NCAA Division I-A independents football records
	Conf.			Overall
Team	W		L	W		L
No. 15 Notre Dame %		–		9	–	3
UCF		–		7	–	4
Middle Tennessee		–		6	–	5
Connecticut		–		3	–	8
Louisiana Tech		–		3	–	9
Louisiana–Lafayette		–		1	–	10
Louisiana–Monroe		–		1	–	10
Navy		–		1	–	10
% – BCS at-large representative; Rankings from AP Poll

The 2000 Notre Dame Fighting Irish football team was an American football team that represented the University of Notre Dame as an independent during the 2000 NCAA Division I-A football season. In their fourth year under head coach Bob Davie, the Irish compiled a 9–3 record, outscored opponents by a total of 344 to 226, and were ranked No. 15 in the final AP poll and No. 16 in the UPI poll. In games against ranked opponents, they defeated No. 25 Texas A&M and No. 13 Purdue but lost to No. 1 Nebraska, No. 23 Michigan State, and No. 5 Oregon State, the latter in the Fiesta Bowl.

Julius Jones received first-team honors as a kick returner from CNNSI on the 2000 All-America college football team. The team's statistical leaders included quarterback Matt LoVecchio (980 passing yards), Julius Jones (657 rushing yards), wide receiver David Givens (25 receptions for 310 yards), and kicker Nicholas Setta (74 points scored, 44 of 45 PAT, 8 of 14 field goals).

The team played its home games at Notre Dame Stadium in Notre Dame, Indiana.

== Schedule ==
Date	Time	Opponent	Rank	Site	TV	Result	Attendance
September 2	1:00 p.m.	No. 25 Texas A&M		Notre Dame Stadium; Notre Dame, IN	NBC	W 24–10	80,232
September 9	2:30 p.m.	No. 1 Nebraska	No. 23	Notre Dame Stadium; Notre Dame, IN (rivalry)	NBC	L 24–27 ^{OT}	80,232
September 16	1:00 p.m.	No. 13 Purdue	No. 21	Notre Dame Stadium; Notre Dame, IN (rivalry)	NBC	W 23–21	80,232
September 23	3:30 p.m.	at No. 23 Michigan State	No. 16	Spartan Stadium; East Lansing, MI (rivalry)	ABC	L 21–27	74,714
October 7	2:30 p.m.	Stanford	No. 25	Notre Dame Stadium; Notre Dame, IN (rivalry)	NBC	W 20–14	80,232
October 14	12:00 p.m.	vs. Navy	No. 20	Florida Citrus Bowl; Orlando, FL (rivalry)	CBS	W 45–14	47,291
October 21	12:00 p.m.	at West Virginia	No. 20	Mountaineer Field; Morgantown, WV	CBS	W 42–28	64,424
October 28	2:30 p.m.	Air Force	No. 19	Notre Dame Stadium; Notre Dame, IN (rivalry)	NBC	W 34–31 ^{OT}	80,232
November 11	2:30 p.m.	Boston College	No. 11	Notre Dame Stadium; Notre Dame, IN (Holy War)	NBC	W 28–16	80,232
November 18	3:30 p.m.	at Rutgers	No. 11	Rutgers Stadium; Piscataway, NJ	CBS	W 45–17	40,011
November 25	3:30 p.m.	at USC	No. 11	Los Angeles Memorial Coliseum; Los Angeles, CA (rivalry)	ABC	W 38–21	81,342
January 1, 2001	8:00 p.m.	vs. No. 5 Oregon State	No. 10	Sun Devil Stadium; Tempe, AZ (Fiesta Bowl)	ABC	L 9–41	75,428
Rankings from AP Poll released prior to the game; All times are in Eastern time

== Rankings ==
Ranking movements Legend: ██ Increase in ranking ██ Decrease in ranking — = Not ranked
	Week																
Poll	Pre	1	2	3	4	5	6	7	8	9	10	11	12	13	14	15	Final
AP	—	—	23	21	16	—	25	20	20	19	15	11	11	11	11	10	15
Coaches Poll	—	—	22	23	18	—	—	—	22	19	16	12	11	10	10	10	16
BCS	Not released									—	14	12	11	11	11	11	Not released

== Season summary ==
After losing ten players to the NFL, the Irish began the 2000 season signing 17 recruits Having to replace two-year starter, Jarious Jackson, Davie chose Arnaz Battle, who looked to have a rough road ahead with the Irish playing four ranked teams in a row to begin the season, including a game against the favorite to win the national championship, Nebraska. Battle, however, did have some help with three veterans named to pre-season award watchlists. The Irish started the season playing the 25th ranked Texas A&M Aggies. With Battle throwing two touchdowns and the defense holding the Aggies to only a field goal in the second half, the Irish won by two touchdowns. Moving into the rankings for the first time since early November 1999, the Irish would next face the top-ranked Cornhuskers. After coming back from being down by two touchdowns, the Irish eventually fell in overtime after they settled for a field goal and Nebraska quarterback, Eric Crouch, ran for the winning touchdown. Despite the loss, and losing Battle indefinitely to a wrist injury that he suffered on the first play of the game, the Irish felt they proved something to the country, and moved up in the rankings to 21st.

The Irish next faced the 13th ranked Purdue Boilermakers, led by Heisman Trophy-hopeful quarterback Drew Brees. The Irish defense held Brees to only 13 completed passes, while Irish backup quarterback Gary Godsey completed 14, and led the team to a last minute win with a Nick Setta field goal. Moving into the top-20 the Irish next went to Michigan State to face the 23rd ranked Spartans. Though the Spartans were led by freshman quarterback Jeff Smoker, he led the team to a win with a 68-yard touchdown pass on a fourth down attempt with a minute remaining in the game. Losing the game, the Irish hadn't won an away game in eight attempts and hadn't beaten the Spartans since 1994. Dropping almost out of the rankings again, the Irish started playing freshman quarterback Matt LoVecchio and began to roll with wins over Stanford and Navy. Going to Morgantown to face the West Virginia Mountaineers, LoVecchio led the Irish with two touchdown passes to Tony Fisher to give the Irish their first road win in two years. With a win over Air Force the next week, their first ever in overtime, the Irish were once again bowl eligible.

Ranked 11th, the Irish continued with wins over Boston College, Rutgers, and their first win at USC since 1992. With a 9–2 record, the Irish got a BCS Bowl bid for the first time ever, with an invitation to the Fiesta Bowl to play the Oregon State Beavers. Getting blown out by the Beavers, the Irish ended the season ranked 15th with a 9–3 record. With the end of the season, Davie was named finalist in two coach of the year awards. In addition, four Irish players were named to All-America Teams, seven players were selected to play in post-season All-Star games, and six players were selected in the 2001 NFL draft, while another three signed free agent contracts with NFL teams. The season ended on a positive note for Davie who signed a five-year contract extension.

== Game summaries ==
=== Nebraska ===
Nebraska (1–0) at Notre Dame (1–0)

Team	1	2	3	4	OT	Total
• No. 1 Cornhuskers	7	7	7	0	6	27
No. 23 Fighting Irish	0	7	7	7	3	24

- Date: September 9
- Location: Notre Dame Stadium, Notre Dame, Indiana
- Game attendance: 80,232
- TV announcers (NBC): Craig Minervini (Play-by-play), Pat Haden (Color) & Bob Wischusen (Sideline)

=== Vs. Oregon State—Fiesta Bowl ===
Notre Dame (9–2) vs. Oregon State(10–1)

Team	1	2	3	4	Total
No. 10 Fighting Irish	0	3	0	6	9
• No. 5 Beavers	3	9	29	0	41

- Date: January 1, 2001
- Location: Sun Devil Stadium, Tempe, AZ
- Game attendance: 75,428
- TV announcers (ABC): Sean McDonough (Play-by-play), Ed Cunningham (Color) & Leslie Gudel (Sideline)
- Source: Box Score

== Roster ==
2000 Notre Dame Fighting Irish football team roster
Players
Coaches
Offense

Pos.	#	Name	Class
QB	2	Dan Novakov	So
QB	3	Arnaz Battle	Jr
FL	6	David Givens	Jr
QB	7	Carlyle Holiday	Fr
WR	8	Lorenzo Crawford	Fr
QB	8	Matt Krueger	Fr
QB	9	Jared Clark	Fr
QB	10	Ryan Krueger	Jr
QB	10	Matt LoVecchio	Fr
SE	11	Jay Johnson	Sr
RB	12	Tony Fisher	Jr
QB	13	Joe Recendez	Sr
QB	14	Gary Godsey	So
QB	16	Abram Elam	Fr
FL	18	Joey Getherall	Sr
SE	21	Javin Hunter	Jr
RB	22	Julius Jones	So
FB	23	Chris Yura	So
RB	26	Garron Bible	Fr
FL	29	Brian Oleniczak	Sr
RB	32	Terrance Howard	Jr
RB	34	Vontez Duff	Fr
RB	35	Tim O'Neill	Jr
FB	36	Tom Lopienski	Jr
FB	40	Jason Murray	Sr
FB	46	Jeremy Juarez	Sr
FB	47	Mike McNair	Jr
C	52	Jeff Faine	So
G	55	Jim Jones	Sr
C	56	John Crowther	Jr
FB	61	Mike Zelenka	Sr
OT	62	Casey Robin	Sr
OT	63	Brennan Curtin	So
TE	64	Jeffrey Campbell	Jr
G	65	Sean Milligan	So
C	66	JW Jordan	Sr
G	67	Ryan Gillis	So
G	69	Mike Gandy	Sr
G	72	Ryan Scarola	Jr
OT	75	Kurt Vollers	Sr
OT	76	John Teasdale	Sr
OT	78	Jordan Black	Jr
G	79	Sean Mahan	Jr
WR	80	Omar Jenkins	Fr
WR	81	Jerome Collins	Fr
SE	82	Bernard Akatu	Jr
WR	82	Ronnie Rodamer	Fr
TE	83	Brendan Hart	Fr
TE	85	Billy Palmer	Fr
TE	86	Dan O'Leary	Sr
TE	87	Jabari Holloway	Sr
TE	89	Gerald Morgan	Jr

Defense

Pos.	#	Name	Class
CB	1	Brock Williams	Sr
MLB	2	Carlos Pierre-Antoine	Jr
FS	4	Justin Smith	Sr
SS	5	Ron Israel	Sr
CB	15	Clifford Jefferson	Jr
SS	19	Glenn Earl	So
FS	20	Gerome Sapp	So
CB	24	Chad DeBolt	Jr
FS	25	Tony Driver	Sr
CB	27	Jason Beckstrom	So
SS	28	Donald Dykes	Jr
OLB	30	Rocky Boiman	Jr
CB	31	Dwayne Francis	Jr
MLB	33	Courtney Watson	So
DB	38	Preston Jackson	Fr
LB	38	Eric Nelson	Jr
MLB	39	Anthony Denman	Sr
LB	41	Mike Goolsby	Fr
CB	42	Shane Walton	Jr
MLB	43	Anthony Brannan	Sr
DE	44	Grant Irons	Sr
SS	45	Matt Sarb	Jr
DL	48	Kyle Budinscak	Fr
LB	49	Derek Curry	Fr
DT	50	Cedric Hilliard	So
MLB	51	Tyreo Harrison	Jr
OLB	52	Mark Mitchell	Sr
LB	53	Jason Halvorson	So
MLB	54	Luigi Rao	Sr
MLB	56	Pat Ryan	So
OLB	57	Justin Thomas	So
LB	58	Joseph Mueller	Sr
MLB	59	Brian Dierckman	Sr
DE	60	Darrell Campbell	So
DE	70	Jim Molinaro	So
DL	77	Greg Pauly	Fr
DE	84	John Owens	Jr
NG	90	Lance Legree	Sr
DE	91	Andrew Dempsey	Sr
DT	93	B.J. Scott	Sr
DT	94	Andy Wisne	Sr
DE	95	Ryan Roberts	Jr
DT	98	Anthony Weaver	Jr
LB	99	Jason Sapp	Fr

Special teams

Pos.	#	Name	Class
K	13	Nick Setta	So
P	17	Joey Hildbold	So
K	35	David Miller	Jr
K	80	Adam Tibble	Jr
K	83	Josh Gentine	So
K	92	Matt McNew	Sr

Head coach

- Bob Davie

Coordinators/assistant coaches

- Kirk Doll – Assistant Head Coach, Linebackers
- Greg Mattison – Defensive Coordinator/Defensive Line
- Urban Meyer – Receivers
- Desmond Robinson – Running Backs
- Dave Borbely – Offensive Line (Guards & Centers)
- Bob Chmiel – Coordinator of Football Operations
- Kevin Rogers – Offensive Coordinator/Quarterbacks
- Lou West – Safeties
- Jerry Rosburg – Cornerbacks
- Steve Addazio – Offensive Line (Tackles & Tight Ends)
- Dan Mullen – Graduate Assistant
- Dennis Moynihan – Graduate Assistant

Legend

- (C) Team captain
- (S) Suspended
- (I) Ineligible
- Injured
- Redshirt

Roster
