= Bob Davie (American football) =

American football player and coach (born 1954)

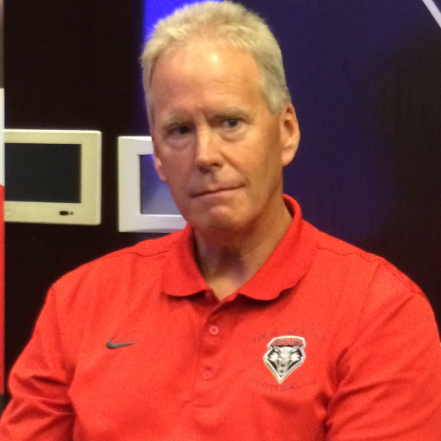
- Davie at 2016 Mountain West Media Days

Biographical details
- Born: September 30, 1954 (age 72); Sewickley, Pennsylvania, U.S.

Playing career
- 1973–1975: Youngstown State
- Position: Tight end

Coaching career (HC unless noted)
- 1977: Pittsburgh (GA)
- 1978–1979: Arizona (LB)
- 1980–1982: Pittsburgh (LB)
- 1983–1984: Tulane (DC)
- 1985–1988: Texas A&M (OLB)
- 1989–1993: Texas A&M (DC)
- 1994–1996: Notre Dame (DC)
- 1997–2001: Notre Dame
- 2012–2019: New Mexico

Head coaching record
- Overall: 70–89
- Bowls: 1–4

Accomplishments and honors

Championships
- 1 MW Mountain Division (2016)

Robert Edwin Davie Jr. (born September 30, 1954) is an American former college football coach and player. He served as the head football coach at the University of Notre Dame from 1997 to 2001 and the University of New Mexico from 2012 to 2019. Davie worked for ESPN as a college football color commentator from 2002 to 2011.

== Early life and playing career ==
Robert Edwin Davie Jr. was born in Sewickley, Pennsylvania to Robert Sr. and June. Davie was raised in Coraopolis, Pennsylvania. As a student at Moon Area High School, Davie excelled in sports, lettering three times each in football, baseball, and basketball. During his senior year, Davie served as captain of both the football and basketball teams. The same year, his elder brother died of cancer.

Davie received a football scholarship to attend the University of Arizona. After two weeks in Arizona, however, Davie became homesick and returned to Pennsylvania. He soon enrolled in nearby Youngstown State University, where he was a starting tight end for three years.

== Assistant coach ==
Following his graduation from Youngstown State in 1977, Davie took a job as a graduate assistant for the University of Pittsburgh football team, working under head coach Jackie Sherrill. Davie then spent two years as an assistant coach at the University of Arizona before returning to the University of Pittsburgh for the 1980–1982 seasons. He then moved to Tulane as defensive coordinator and assistant head coach from 1983 to 1984. From 1985 to 1988, Davie served as the outside linebackers coach at Texas A&M University before serving as the school's defensive coordinator from 1989 to 1993. During his stint at A&M, he helped further develop the "Wrecking Crew" defense, which, in 1991 was No. 1 in the nation in total defense.

In 1994, Lou Holtz, the head coach at the University of Notre Dame, offered Davie a job as defensive coordinator, at the recommendation of Notre Dame offensive line coach Joe Moore. Although Davie twice turned down this job offer, after discussing the matter with his wife he agreed to work for Holtz. Under Davie, the Notre Dame defense improved, and in 1996 the team set a school record for number of sacks and allowed the lowest total yardage of any Notre Dame team since 1980. In September 1995, Davie served as interim head coach when Holtz missed a game in order to have surgery. Under Davie, Notre Dame beat Vanderbilt 41–0.

== Head coach ==
=== Notre Dame ===
In November 1996, Holtz retired from Notre Dame after eleven seasons as head coach. Notre Dame interviewed four candidates, including Gary Barnett, Tom Clements, and Davie. Davie had applied for several other head coaching jobs and was offered a position at Purdue University. He turned down Purdue when offered the opportunity to become the next head coach at Notre Dame. Davie was the first assistant to become a head coach at Notre Dame since 1954 when Terry Brennan replaced Frank Leahy.

Many fans were not excited about Davie's promotion. His habit of referring to the traditions of Texas A&M University rather than those of Notre Dame alienated some. Within months of his hiring, Davie and the university were sued by Joe Moore, who had been fired by Davie. Moore alleged that Davie had defamed him and that his firing was a result of age discrimination. Although a judge dismissed the defamation charges, the university was later found guilty of age discrimination, and Moore received a small settlement. Throughout much of the proceedings, fan sentiment had been on Moore's side, with many fans very unhappy with Davie. During Davie's tenure, Notre Dame was also placed under NCAA sanctions for the first time over the actions of a booster Kim Dunbar, who had stolen $1.2 million and spent it on Notre Dame players during Lou Holtz's time as head coach. The school was placed on probation and lost two scholarships, and the university subsequently disbanded all booster clubs.

In five seasons at Notre Dame, Davie compiled a 35–25 record including three bowl games. The 2001 Fiesta Bowl, a 41–9 loss to Oregon State, was the first Bowl Championship Series game in school history. His final season included the 2001 AFCA Academic Achievement Award when the Notre Dame football team posted a 100% graduation rate.

Notre Dame's performance on the field was inconsistent from year to year during Davie's tenure. Following a 7–6 campaign in 1997 which saw Notre Dame overcome a 2–5 start, the 1998 Irish were poised for a major bowl bid with a 9–1 record going into their 1998 season finale against USC. The Irish led 39-36 with 21 seconds left but were mired in their own territory and had to kill time for four plays because LSU had three timeouts. On 4th down with eight seconds remaining, Davie instructed his quarterback Jarious Jackson to scramble around in the end zone before taking a safety. Ideally, this would have wound the clock almost to zero, but instead, Jackson suffered a blindsided hit, leading to ligament damage in his right knee. Consequently, Jackson did not play against Southern California and Notre Dame, its offense rendered powerless, suffered a 10–0 loss. The team had to settle for a Gator Bowl bid and lost to Georgia Tech, finishing the season 9–3. A 5–7 campaign followed in 1999, and the national media began to question Davie's abilities.

In 2000 the Irish bounced back and finished 9–3 once again. Newly hired athletic director Kevin White promptly gave Davie a five-year contract extension. Within weeks of signing the contract extension, Davie's team lost in the Fiesta Bowl. During the next season, Davie presided over the first 0–3 start in Notre Dame history in 2001. The Irish won their next three games to even their record, but losses to Boston College, Tennessee and Stanford sealed Davie's fate as the Irish finished 5–6.

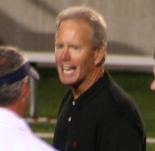
Bob Davie in 2009.

He was fired on December 2, one day after a 24–18 win over Purdue. Davie was replaced by George O'Leary, who in turn resigned after it was revealed that his resume contained serious inaccuracies. Notre Dame then turned to Tyrone Willingham to lead the program.

=== New Mexico ===
On November 16, 2011, Davie was hired as the new football coach at New Mexico replacing Mike Locksley. With Davie, the Lobos won the 2016 Mountain West Conference Mountain Division championship along with Wyoming and Boise State. On February 8, 2018, he was suspended 30 days without pay; this was related to his handling of incidents of alleged misconduct by football players at UNM.

After the Lobos' 2019 season opener, a 39–31 victory against Sam Houston State, Davie was hospitalized for heart problems, forcing him to cancel the post-game press conference. Run game coordinator and offensive line coach Saga Tuitele served as interim head coach for New Mexico's game against Notre Dame.

On November 25, 2019, it was announced that New Mexico and Davie have agreed to part ways.

== Media career ==
Between his head coaching positions at Notre Dame and New Mexico, Davie was a college football analyst for ESPN.

== Personal life ==
Davie is married to the former Joanne Fratangelo. They are the parents of two children, Audra and Clay. Clay Davie played football at Arizona State University.

== Head coaching record ==
Year	Team	Overall	Conference	Standing	Bowl/playoffs	Coaches^{#}	AP^{°}
Notre Dame Fighting Irish (NCAA Division I-A Independent) (1997–2001)
1997	Notre Dame	7–6			L Independence		
1998	Notre Dame	9–3			L Gator	22	22
1999	Notre Dame	5–7					
2000	Notre Dame	9–3			L Fiesta^{†}	16	15
2001	Notre Dame	5–6					
Notre Dame:		35–25					
New Mexico Lobos (Mountain West Conference) (2012–2019)
2012	New Mexico	4–9	1–7	T–9th			
2013	New Mexico	3–9	1–7	5th (Mountain)			
2014	New Mexico	4–8	2–6	T–5th (Mountain)			
2015	New Mexico	7–6	5–3	T–2nd (Mountain)	L New Mexico		
2016	New Mexico	9–4	6–2	T–1st (Mountain)	W New Mexico		
2017	New Mexico	3–9	1–7	6th (Mountain)			
2018	New Mexico	3–9	1–7	6th (Mountain)			
2019	New Mexico	2–10	0–8	6th (Mountain)			
New Mexico:		35–64	17–47				
Total:		70–89					
National championship Conference title Conference division title or championship game berth
^{†}Indicates BCS bowl.; ^{#}Rankings from final Coaches Poll.; ^{°}Rankings from final AP Poll.

== Sources ==
- Eden, Scott (2005), Touchdown Jesus: Faith and Fandom at Notre Dame, Simon and Schuster, ISBN 0-7432-8165-9
