= 2000 Stephen F. Austin Lumberjacks football team =

American college football season

2000 Stephen F. Austin Lumberjacks football
- Conference: Southland Conference
- Record: 6–5 (3–4 Southland)
- Head coach: Mike Santiago (2nd season)
- Defensive coordinator: Denzil Cox
- Home stadium: Homer Bryce Stadium

2000 Southland Football League standings
	Conf.			Overall
Team	W		L	W		L
No. 9 Troy State $^	7	–	0	10	–	2
No. 16 McNeese State ^	5	–	2	8	–	4
No. 25 Southwest Texas State	5	–	2	7	–	4
Sam Houston State	4	–	3	7	–	4
Stephen F. Austin	3	–	4	6	–	5
Jacksonville State	2	–	5	4	–	6
Northwestern State	1	–	6	4	–	7
Nicholls State	1	–	6	2	–	9
$ – Conference champion; ^ – NCAA Division I-AA playoff participant; Northwestern State forfeited conference wins over Troy State and Nicholls State.; Rankings from The Sports Network poll

The 2000 Stephen F. Austin Lumberjacks football team represented Stephen F. Austin State University as a member of the Southland Conference during the 2000 NCAA Division I-AA football season. Led by second-year head coach Mike Santiago the Lumberjacks compiled an overall record of 6–5 with a mark of 3–4 in conference play, placing fifth in the Southland. Stephen F. Austin played home games at Homer Bryce Stadium in Nacogdoches, Texas.

== Schedule ==
Date	Time	Opponent	Rank	Site	Result	Attendance	Source
August 31		Central Oklahoma*		Homer Bryce Stadium; Nacogdoches, TX	W 38–31 ^{OT}	7,350	
September 9		Texas A&M–Commerce*		Homer Bryce Stadium; Nacogdoches, TX	W 48–21	10,048	
September 16	6:00 p.m.	at Louisiana Tech*		Joe Aillet Stadium; Ruston, LA	W 34–31 ^{2OT}	17,320	
September 23	4:05 p.m.	at Northern Iowa*	No. 10	UNI-Dome; Cedar Falls, IA	L 30–37	12,206	
October 7		at McNeese State	No. 14	Cowboy Stadium; Lake Charles, LA	L 6-37	17,000 (Note: According to the 2000 SFA statistics sheet, a total of 72,995 spectators attended the six away games. 55,995 combined spectators attended the away games not including McNeese.)	
October 14		Sam Houston State	No. 24	Homer Bryce Stadium; Nacogdoches, TX (Battle of the Piney Woods)	L 41–52	13,473	
October 21		at Nicholls State		John L. Guidry Stadium; Thibodaux, LA	W 27–20	2,673	
October 26	6:30 p.m.	at Jacksonville State		Paul Snow Stadium; Jacksonville, AL	W 27–21	10,107	
November 4		No. 7 Troy State		Homer Bryce Stadium; Nacogdoches, TX	L 0–6	4,806	
November 11		at Southwest Texas State		Bobcat Stadium; San Marcos, TX	L 21–38	13,689	
November 18	2:00 p.m.	Northwestern State		Homer Bryce Stadium; Nacogdoches, TX (Chief Caddo)	W 17–3	2,317	
*Non-conference game; Rankings from The Sports Network Poll released prior to the game; All times are in Central time

== Game summaries ==
=== Central Oklahoma ===
The Central Oklahoma Bronchos (the #4-ranked NCAA Division II team according to Sports Illustrated) scored first with a 49-yard field goal by Evan Lutrell. The Jacks would respond with Freddy Lyons scoring a 32-yard touchdown from quarterback Wes Pate; then, nineteen seconds later, Central Oklahoma fumbled the ball and linebacker Maada Smith returned it for a 23-yard touchdown. SFA later scored on an 80-yard receiving touchdown by Lawrence Hamilton.

At halftime, the Lumberjacks led 21-3. However, the Bronchos would climb back into the game and take the lead when the Jacks fell victim to a fumble and a blocked punt in the third quarter. Furthermore, Wes Pate injured his knee late in the game, but SFA tied the game with a field goal on that same drive with 19 seconds left in the fourth quarter.

The Lumberjacks struck first in overtime when backup quarterback Travis Fallon connected on an 8-yard pass to Freddy Lyons for the touchdown. The game ended with a Lumberjack victory when defensive lineman Michael Adams tackled Brochos’ quarterback Brett Manning on fourth down.

=== Texas A&M-Commerce ===
Backup quarterback Travis Fallon continued his success from the previous game by throwing 111 passing yards and scoring two touchdowns (one rushing) and running back Derrick Blaylock ran for 218 rushing yards scoring three touchdowns as the Lumberjacks defeated Texas A&M-Commerce, 48-21.

=== Louisiana Tech ===
The Lumberjacks went into Ruston, LA, and upset the Division I-A Louisiana Tech Bulldogs, 34-31, in double overtime.

=== Northern Iowa ===
After Panthers kicker Mackenzie Hoambrecker’s 37-yard field goal gave Northern Iowa a 37-23 lead over SFA halfway through the fourth quarter, Lumberjacks’ Richard Daniels returned the ensuing kickoff 100 yards for a touchdown, making it a one-score game. Stephen F. Austin drove down to the Panther’s 12-yard line on their next drive but failed to capitalize as quarterback Wes Pate threw four straight incomplete passes. Stephen F. Austin led 17-0 at the end of the first quarter but were outscored 20-6 in the second quarter and 17-7 in the second half.

=== McNeese State ===
In the Southland opener for both teams, McNeese dominated as the Cowboys defeated the Lumberjacks, 37-6. The Cowboys were led by Jesse Burton, who ran for 128 yards, while Derrick Blaylock of SFA ran for 98 yards.

=== Sam Houston State ===
Sam Houston began the game by scoring 17 unanswered points, but Stephen F. Austin answered with a 27-point second quarter to go into halftime up 27-24 on Homecoming Saturday. The Jacks lead was short-lived, however, as Bearkats’ Chris Foster returned the second-half kickoff 91 yards for the TD. Both teams would trade blows as SFA’s Derrick Blaylock and SHSU’s Willie Thomas each scored a touchdown. Sam Houston later got another touchdown on a 3-yard run by Eric Brown.

=== Nicholls State ===
The Lumberjacks snapped their three-game losing streak by outscoring Nicholls State 20-3 in the second half. This was highlighted by a 68-yard touchdown run by Derrick Blaylock in the third quarter.

=== Jacksonville State ===
Stephen F. Austin led Jacksonville State 27-0, but Jacksonville State staged a furious comeback only to fall short, as the Lumberjacks won, 27-21—their second straight victory. Gamecocks’ Roger Bell ran for 114 yards on only eight attempts. Derrick Blaylock ran for 120 on 13 attempts to get over 1,000-yard rushing yards on the season, but he left the game with a sprained ankle in the third quarter.

=== Troy State ===
The Lumberjacks lost a defensive slugfest, 6-0, at Homer Bryce Stadium. Wes Pate threw two interceptions, while Derrick Blaylock ran for 99 yards on 17 carries.

=== Southwest Texas State ===
SFA quarterback Wes Pate continued his struggles as he threw 11-21 with two interceptions. While Stephen F. Austin opened the game with a lead, turnovers and penalties plagued the Jacks for the rest of the game, including a lost fumble by backup quarterback Travis Fallon. The Bobcats ran for 186 yards in SFA’s 38-21 loss.

=== Northwestern State ===
The Stephen F. Austin Lumberjacks ended their seesaw season on a high note against Northwestern State. Both teams were at a 3-3 stalemate at halftime, but SFA woke up in the second half by outscoring the Demons 14-0. Derrick Blaylock ran for 131 yards and one touchdown, while Lawrence Hamilton caught four passes for 101 yards and one touchdown.

== Roster ==
2000 Stephen F. Austin Lumberjacks Football
Quarterbacks: 2 – Wes Pate – Junior (6'3, 240); 5 - Matt Williford - Sophomore (6'1, 195); 8 - Peyton Jones - Senior (6'4, 220); 12 - Travis Fallon - Senior (6'3, 210); 18 - Michael Williams - Freshman (6'0, 190; Running backs: 7 - Taylor Bunch - Sophomore (5'11, 220); 26 - Derrick Blaylock - Senior (5'10, 190); 29 - Mike Kroese - Junior (6'0, 200); 30 - Ahmad Traylor - Junior (5'9, 195); 37 - Gary Allen - Freshman (5'11, 220); 41 - Felton Johnson - (redshirt) Freshman (5'11, 200); 42 - Thomas Williams - Freshman (6'0, 196); Fullbacks: 31 - Marcus Hamilton - Freshman (5'10, 240); 34 - Will Bowers - Sophomore (6'1, 235); Wide receivers: 1 - Freddy Lyons - Senior (5'8, 165); 3 - Richard Daniels - Senior (5'10, 170); 9 - Paul Todd - (redshirt) Freshman (6'1, 175); 15 - Anthony Dingle - Sophomore (5'11, 185); 80 - Robert Price - Freshman (6'3, 190); 84 - Ryan White - Senior (6'2, 188); 85 - Scott Keys - Senior (6'2, 200); 88 - Lawrence Hamilton - Sophomore (6'4, 185); Tight ends: 82 - Beau Hodges - Sophomore (6'3, 255); 86 - Lance Hays - Freshman (6'2, 220); 87 - Vince Walker - Sophomore (6'5, 250); Kicker/Punter: 48 - Ryan Rossner - Freshman (6'3, 238) (K); 49 - Marc Rutherford - Senior (6'0, 220) (P)	Offensive Lineman: 51 - Josh Arceneaux - Senior (6'5, 290); 55 - David Phillips - (redshirt) Freshman (6'5, 250); 62 - Roy Chad Eddins - Freshman (6'5, 320); 64 - Dustin Nichols - Junior (6'3, 270); 66 - Chuck Thompson - Junior (6'2, 285); 67 - Luke Herrick - Senior (6'2, 312); 68 - Justin Fenley - (redshirt) Freshman (6'6, 280); 71 - Tim Hodges - Sophomore (6'8, 310); 73 - Shannon Yates - Senior (6'4, 311); 74 - Brett Carroll - Junior (6'6, 291); 75 - Demetrius Hoyle - Freshman (6'5, 320); 77 - Jeremy Stolfa - (redshirt) Freshman (6'5, 287); 78 - Joe Owens - Sophomore (6'4, 295); 79 - Terry Mayer - (redshirt) Freshman (6'8, 345); Defensive Lineman: 53 - Walker Molinare - Junior (6'3, 240); 56 - Travis Carter - Sophomore (5'9, 220); 57 - Chad Harrison - Junior (6'3, 225); 60 - Christopher Smith - (redshirt) Freshman (6'3, 246); 69 - Kevin Pesic - Junior (6'4, 255); 72 - Greg Barnum - Sophomore (6'1, 300); 90 - Michael Adams - Sophomore (6'3, 220); 92 - Willie Harvey - Senior (6'4, 270); 93 - Vernon Holman - (redshirt) Freshman (6'2, 210); 96 - Kenneth Winters - Freshman (6'3, 260); 97 - Le Alfred Sanders - Freshman (6'2, 255); 98 - Phillip Richard - Freshman (6'2, 275); 99 - Ed Henson - Freshman (6'4, 275)	Linebackers: 11 - DeKendrick Vidito - Junior (6'0, 215); 28 - Aubrey Brisendine - Junior (6'0, 205); 32 - Kyle Dews - Senior (6'1, 230); 36 - Nick Trotter - Freshman (6'11, 215); 39 - Mike McElroy - Senior (6'3, 225); 40 - Reggie Williams - Junior (6'1, 225); 43 - Jeremy Davis - Freshman (6'2, 220); 44 - Jared Williams - Sophomore (6'2, 245); 50 - Eric Robinson - Freshman (5'11, 215); 52 - Maada Smith - Junior (6'1, 225); 54 - Bruce Bates - Junior (5'9, 200); Defensive backs: 4 - Braxton O'Banion - Junior (5'11, 180); 6 - Thomas Hightower - Junior (5'10, 165); 13 - Larry Brooks - Junior (5'10, 173); 14 - Braylon Lester - Freshman (5'9, 185); 20 - Daron Ballard - (redshirt) Freshman (5'8, 180); 22 - Jonathan Daniels - Sophomore (5'9, 165); 23 - Ahmad Vital - Junior (5'8, 180); 24 - Kevon Morton - Junior (5'7, 160); 25 - David Crocker - (redshirt) Freshman (5'10, 195); 27 - Tim Mays - Junior (5'11, 195); 33 - Brandon North - Senior (5'11, 205); 38 - Brad Verret - Sophomore (6'2, 210); 45 - James Prince - Freshman (6'2, 185); 47 - Brent Hafford - Freshman (5'10, 165); Defensive Ends: 35 - Albert Sanchez - Senior (6’2, 240); 95 - Fred Tucker - (redshirt) Freshman (6’4, 240); Safeties: 58 - Brandon Louvier - Junior (6’0, 210); 94 - Louis Rossitto - Junior (6’3, 245); Legend: (C) Team captain; (S) Suspended; (I) Ineligible; Injured; Redshirt
