= 2000 Louisiana–Lafayette Ragin' Cajuns football team =

American college football season

2000 Louisiana–Lafayette Ragin' Cajuns football
- Conference: Independent
- Record: 1–10
- Head coach: Jerry Baldwin (2nd season)
- Offensive coordinator: Larry Edmondson (2nd season)
- Defensive coordinator: Tony Tademy (2nd season)
- Home stadium: Cajun Field

2000 NCAA Division I-A independents football records
	Conf.			Overall
Team	W		L	W		L
No. 15 Notre Dame %		–		9	–	3
UCF		–		7	–	4
Middle Tennessee		–		6	–	5
Connecticut		–		3	–	8
Louisiana Tech		–		3	–	9
Louisiana–Lafayette		–		1	–	10
Louisiana–Monroe		–		1	–	10
Navy		–		1	–	10
% – BCS at-large representative; Rankings from AP Poll

The 2000 Louisiana–Lafayette Ragin' Cajuns football team represented the University of Louisiana at Lafayette as an independent in the 2000 NCAA Division I-A football season. They were led by second-year head coach Jerry Baldwin and played their home games at Cajun Field in Lafayette, Louisiana.

== Schedule ==
Date	Opponent	Site	TV	Result	Attendance	Source
September 2	Sam Houston State	Cajun Field; Lafayette, LA		L 14–21	15,728	
September 9	at No. 6 Texas	Darrell K Royal–Texas Memorial Stadium; Austin, TX	FSSW	L 10–52	80,017	
September 16	at Texas Tech	Jones SBC Stadium; Lubbock, TX		L 0–26	35,740	
September 23	Northwestern State	Cajun Field; Lafayette, LA		L 21–23	15,212	
September 30	at UAB	Legion Field; Birmingham, AL		L 2–47	22,000	
October 7	Tulane	Cajun Field; Lafayette, LA		L 37–38	20,113	
October 14	at Louisiana Tech	Joe Aillet Stadium; Ruston, LA		L 14–48	18,125	
October 28	North Texas	Cajun Field; Lafayette, LA		L 0–13	12,650	
November 4	at Louisiana–Monroe	Malone Stadium; Monroe, LA (Battle on the Bayou)		W 21–18	7,782	
November 11	Jacksonville State	Cajun Field; Lafayette, LA		L 14–28	8,595	
November 18	at Middle Tennessee	Johnny "Red" Floyd Stadium; Murfreesboro, TN		L 38–41 ^{2OT}	7,913	
Rankings from AP Poll released prior to the game
