= 2000 McNeese State Cowboys football team =

American college football season

2000 McNeese State Cowboys football

NCAA Division I-AA First Round, L 17–42 vs. Georgia Southern
- Conference: Southland Conference

Ranking
- Sports Network: No. 16
- Record: 8–4 (5–2 Southland)
- Head coach: Tommy Tate (1st season)
- Offensive coordinator: Matt Viator (1st season)
- Defensive coordinator: Scott Stoker (1st season)
- Home stadium: Cowboy Stadium

2000 Southland Football League standings
	Conf.			Overall
Team	W		L	W		L
No. 9 Troy State $^	7	–	0	10	–	2
No. 16 McNeese State ^	5	–	2	8	–	4
No. 25 Southwest Texas State	5	–	2	7	–	4
Sam Houston State	4	–	3	7	–	4
Stephen F. Austin	3	–	4	6	–	5
Jacksonville State	2	–	5	4	–	6
Northwestern State	1	–	6	4	–	7
Nicholls State	1	–	6	2	–	9
$ – Conference champion; ^ – NCAA Division I-AA playoff participant; Northwestern State forfeited conference wins over Troy State and Nicholls State.; Rankings from The Sports Network poll

The 2000 McNeese State Cowboys football team was an American football team that represented McNeese State University as a member of the Southland Conference (Southland) during the 2000 NCAA Division I-AA football season. In their first year under head coach Tommy Tate, the team compiled an overall record of 8–4, with a mark of 5–2 in conference play, and finished tied for second in the Southland. The Cowboys advanced to the NCAA Division I-AA Football Championship playoffs and lost to Georgia Southern in the first round.

== Schedule ==
Date	Opponent	Rank	Site	Result	Attendance	Source
August 31	at No. 5 (I-A) Miami (FL)*		Miami Orange Bowl; Miami, FL	L 14–61	48,111	
September 9	vs. Prairie View A&M*		Reliant Astrodome; Houston, TX	W 41–0	3,105	
September 16	Southwest Missouri State*		Cowboy Stadium; Lake Charles, LA	W 26–19 ^{2OT}	14,460	
September 23	at Alcorn State*		Jack Spinks Stadium; Lorman, MS	W 41–12	3,500	
October 7	No. 14 Stephen F. Austin		Cowboy Stadium; Lake Charles, LA	W 40–14	17,000	
October 14	Jacksonville State	No. 22	Cowboy Stadium; Lake Charles, LA	W 28–0	15,021	
October 21	at No. 9 Northwestern State	No. 17	Harry Turpin Stadium; Natchitoches, LA (rivalry)	L 34–37	14,586	
October 28	at Sam Houston State	No. 21	Bowers Stadium; Huntsville, TX	W 31–17	10,017	
November 4	Southwest Texas State	No. 17	Cowboy Stadium; Lake Charles, LA	W 18–3	11,606	
November 11	at No. 3 Troy State	No. 16	Veterans Memorial Stadium; Troy, AL	L 16–20	15,715	
November 18	Nicholls State	No. 17	Cowboy Stadium; Lake Charles, LA	W 12–7	5,000	
November 25	at No. 5 Georgia Southern*	No. 16	Paulson Stadium; Statesboro, GA (NCAA Division I-AA First Round)	L 17–42	5,350	
*Non-conference game; Rankings from The Sports Network Poll released prior to the game
