= 2000 Louisiana Tech Bulldogs football team =

American college football season

2000 Louisiana Tech Bulldogs football
- Conference: Independent
- Record: 3–9
- Head coach: Jack Bicknell Jr. (2nd season)
- Co-offensive coordinators: Conroy Hines (1st season); Rob Spence (1st season)
- Defensive coordinator: Tom Masella (2nd season)
- Captains: Brian Bradford; Sean Cangelosi; James Jordan; Quincy Stewart
- Home stadium: Joe Aillet Stadium

2000 NCAA Division I-A independents football records
	Conf.			Overall
Team	W		L	W		L
No. 15 Notre Dame %		–		9	–	3
UCF		–		7	–	4
Middle Tennessee		–		6	–	5
Connecticut		–		3	–	8
Louisiana Tech		–		3	–	9
Louisiana–Lafayette		–		1	–	10
Louisiana–Monroe		–		1	–	10
Navy		–		1	–	10
% – BCS at-large representative; Rankings from AP Poll

The 2000 Louisiana Tech Bulldogs football team represented Louisiana Tech University as an independent during the 2000 NCAA Division I-A football season. Led by second-year head coach Jack Bicknell Jr., the Bulldogs played their home games at Joe Aillet Stadium in Ruston, Louisiana. The team finished the season with a record of 3–9.

== Schedule ==
Date	Time	Opponent	Site	TV	Result	Attendance	Source
August 26	6:00 pm	Mississippi Valley State	Joe Aillet Stadium; Ruston, LA		W 63–10	18,565	
September 2	6:00 pm	at No. 8 Kansas State	KSU Stadium; Manhattan, KS	FSN	L 10–54	48,902	
September 9	11:00 am	at Penn State	Beaver Stadium; University Park, PA	ESPN Plus	L 7–67	94,955	
September 16	6:00 pm	Stephen F. Austin	Joe Aillet Stadium; Ruston, LA		L 31–34 ^{2OT}	17,320	
September 23	6:00 pm	at Tulsa	Skelly Stadium; Tulsa, OK		L 10–22	17,673	
October 7	6:00 pm	at Middle Tennessee	Johnny "Red" Floyd Stadium; Murfreesboro, TN		L 21–49	11,302	
October 14	6:00 pm	Louisiana–Lafayette^{†}	Joe Aillet Stadium; Ruston, LA (rivalry)		W 48–14	18,125	
October 21	1:00 pm	at Auburn	Jordan–Hare Stadium; Auburn, AL	PPV	L 28–38	82,140	
October 28	5:00 pm	at No. 4 Miami (FL)	Miami Orange Bowl; Miami, FL	ESPN Plus	L 31–42	46,617	
November 4	6:00 pm	UCF	Joe Aillet Stadium; Ruston, LA		L 16–20	12,532	
November 11	6:00 pm	at Louisiana–Monroe	Malone Stadium; Monroe, LA (rivalry)		W 42–19	14,756	
November 18	10:00 pm	at Hawaii	Aloha Stadium; Honolulu, HI		L 10–27	31,963	
^{†}Homecoming; Rankings from Coaches' Poll released prior to the game; All times are in Central time
