= 2000 Navy Midshipmen football team =

American college football season

2000 Navy Midshipmen football
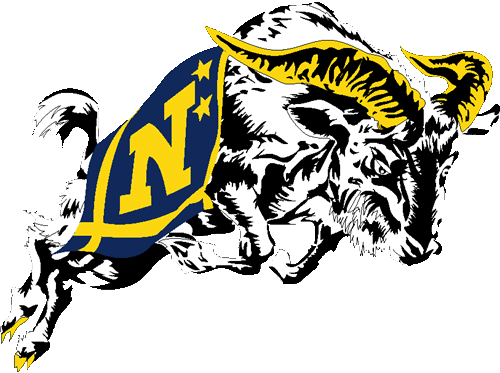
- Conference: Independent
- Record: 1–10
- Head coach: Charlie Weatherbie (6th season)
- Offensive coordinator: Mike Vaught (2nd season)
- Offensive scheme: Triple option
- Defensive coordinator: Tim DeRuyter (2nd season)
- Base defense: 3–4
- MVP: Chris Lepore
- Captains: Brian Broadwater; Brad Wimsatt
- Home stadium: Navy–Marine Corps Memorial Stadium

2000 NCAA Division I-A independents football records
	Conf.			Overall
Team	W		L	W		L
No. 15 Notre Dame %		–		9	–	3
UCF		–		7	–	4
Middle Tennessee		–		6	–	5
Connecticut		–		3	–	8
Louisiana Tech		–		3	–	9
Louisiana–Lafayette		–		1	–	10
Louisiana–Monroe		–		1	–	10
Navy		–		1	–	10
% – BCS at-large representative; Rankings from AP Poll

The 2000 Navy Midshipmen football team represented the United States Naval Academy (USNA) as an independent during the 2000 NCAA Division I-A football season. The team was led by sixth-year head coach Charlie Weatherbie.

== Schedule ==
Date	Time	Opponent	Site	TV	Result	Attendance
September 2	7:00 p.m.	Temple	Navy–Marine Corps Memorial Stadium; Annapolis, MD		L 6–17	28,335
September 16	3:30 p.m.	at Georgia Tech	Bobby Dodd Stadium; Atlanta, GA	HTS	L 13–40	46,042
September 23	12:00 p.m.	at Boston College	Alumni Stadium; Chestnut Hill, MA	ESPN Plus	L 7–48	42,681
September 30	12:00 p.m.	No. 18 TCU	Navy–Marine Corps Memorial Stadium; Annapolis, MD	FSN	L 0–24	28,477
October 7	3:00 p.m.	at Air Force	Falcon Stadium; Colorado Springs, CO (Commander-in-Chief's Trophy)		L 13–27	50,342
October 14	12:00 p.m.	vs. No. 20 Notre Dame	Florida Citrus Bowl; Orlando, FL (rivalry)	CBS	L 14–45	47,291
October 21	12:00 p.m.	Rutgers^{†}	Navy–Marine Corps Memorial Stadium; Annapolis, MD		L 21–28	32,108
October 28	12:00 p.m.	Toledo	Navy–Marine Corps Memorial Stadium; Annapolis, MD		L 20–21	27,355
November 11	6:00 p.m.	at Tulane	Louisiana Superdome; New Orleans, LA		L 38–50	20,081
November 18	12:00 p.m.	Wake Forest	Navy–Marine Corps Memorial Stadium; Annapolis, MD		L 26–49	30,370
December 2	12:00 p.m.	vs. Army	PSINet Stadium; Baltimore, MD (Army–Navy Game)	CBS	W 30–28	70,685
^{†}Homecoming; Rankings from AP Poll released prior to the game; All times are in Eastern time

== Game summaries ==
=== Army ===
Army Black Knights (1–9) vs. Navy Midshipmen (0–10)

Quarter	1	2	3	4	Total
Army	7	0	7	14	28
Navy	10	10	7	3	30

at PSINet Stadium • Baltimore, Maryland

- Date: December 2
- Game attendance: 70,685
- TV announcers (CBS): Verne Lundquist, Todd Blackledge, and Jill Arrington
- DailyPress.com

Game information

Army

- Curtis Zervic
  9/15, 99 Yds, 2 TD
- Michael Wallace
  159 Rush Yds, TD

Navy

- Brian Broadwater
  88 Pass Yds, TD
  121 Rush Yds, TD

The first Army–Navy game in Baltimore since 1944.

Scoring summary

Quarter	Time	Drive			Team	Scoring information	Score	
Quarter	Time	Plays	Yards	TOP	Team	Scoring information	ARMY	NAVY
1					Army	Michael Wallace 65-yard touchdown run, kick good	7	0
1					Navy	-yard field goal by David Hills	7	3
1					Navy	Brian Broadwater 45-yard touchdown run, David Hills kick good	7	10
					Navy	Brian Williams 32-yard touchdown reception from Brian Broadwater, David Hills kick good	7	17
					Navy	-yard field goal by David Hills	7	20
3	3:22				Navy	Fumble recovery returned 3 yards for touchdown by Brad Wimsatt, David Hills kick good	7	27
3					Army	Blocked punt returned 7 yards for touchdown by Ben Woodruff, kick good	14	27
4					Army	Brian Bruenton 23-yard touchdown reception from Curtis Zervic, kick good	21	27
4	5:32				Navy	-yard field goal by David Hills	21	30
4	2:44				Army	-yard touchdown reception from Curtis Zervic, kick good	28	30
"TOP" = time of possession. For other American football terms, see Glossary of American football.							28	30

== Roster ==
2000 Navy Midshipmen football team roster
Players
Coaches
Offense

Pos.	#	Name	Class
QB	6	Craig Candeto	Fr
QB	10	Ed Malinowski	Jr
QB	14	Brian Broadwater	Sr
G	64	John Jeffery	Jr
C	74	Chad Adams	Sr
WR	81	Brian Williams	Sr
WR	83	Dominic Bailey	Fr

Defense

Pos.	#	Name	Class
S	26	Chris Lepore	Sr
LB	50	Bent Matthews	Fr
DE	57	Josh Wolf	Jr
DE	94	Brad Wimsatt (C)	Sr

Special teams

Pos.	#	Name	Class
K	4	David Hills	Jr

Head coach

- Charlie Weatherbie

Coordinators/assistant coaches

Legend

- (C) Team captain
- (S) Suspended
- (I) Ineligible
- Injured
- Redshirt

Roster
