= 2000 Nicholls State Colonels football team =

American college football season

2000 Nicholls State Colonels football
- Conference: Southland Football League
- Record: 2–9 (1–6 Southland)
- Head coach: Daryl Daye (2nd season)
- Offensive coordinator: Mike McCarty (2nd season)
- Defensive coordinator: Jay Thomas (2nd season)
- Home stadium: John L. Guidry Stadium

2000 Southland Football League standings
	Conf.			Overall
Team	W		L	W		L
No. 9 Troy State $^	7	–	0	10	–	2
No. 16 McNeese State ^	5	–	2	8	–	4
No. 25 Southwest Texas State	5	–	2	7	–	4
Sam Houston State	4	–	3	7	–	4
Stephen F. Austin	3	–	4	6	–	5
Jacksonville State	2	–	5	4	–	6
Northwestern State	1	–	6	4	–	7
Nicholls State	1	–	6	2	–	9
$ – Conference champion; ^ – NCAA Division I-AA playoff participant; Northwestern State forfeited conference wins over Troy State and Nicholls State.; Rankings from The Sports Network poll

The 2000 Nicholls State Colonels football team represented Nicholls State University as a member of the Southland Football League during the 2000 NCAA Division I-AA football season. Led by second-year head Daryl Daye, the Colonels finished the season with an overall record of 1–10 and a mark of 0–7 in conference play, placing last out of eight teams in the Southland. Nicholls State played home games at John L. Guidry Stadium in Thibodaux, Louisiana.

In the spring of 2001, Northwestern State forfeited two wins from the 2000 season, over Nicholls State and Troy State, because an ineligible player had participated for the Demons in those games. With the forfeit, the Colonels' record improved to 2–9 overall and 1–6 in conference play, moving Troy State into a tie with Northwestern State for seventh place in the Southland standings.

== Schedule ==
Date	Time	Opponent	Site	Result	Attendance	Source
August 31		Central Arkansas*	John L. Guidry Stadium; Thibodaux, LA	W 52–44	2,567	
September 9	6:30 p.m.	Jacksonville State	John L. Guidry Stadium; Thibodaux, LA	L 3–10	13,211	
September 16	6:00 p.m.	at Louisiana–Monroe*	Malone Stadium; Monroe, LA	L 21–27	14,206	
September 23	1:05 p.m.	at No. 15 Western Illinois*	Hanson Field; Macomb, IL	L 3–44	4,787	
September 30	6:00 p.m.	at Samford*	Seibert Stadium; Homewood, AL	L 10–28	7,231	
October 7		at Southwest Texas State	Bobcat Stadium; San Marcos, TX (rivalry)	L 0–25	11,277	
October 14		No. 10 Northwestern State	John L. Guidry Stadium; Thibodaux, LA (rivalry)	W 21–27 (forfeit)		
October 21		Stephen F. Austin	John L. Guidry Stadium; Thibodaux, LA	L 20–27	2,673	
October 28		at No. 10 Troy State	Veterans Memorial Stadium; Troy, AL	L 12–41	17,547	
November 4		Sam Houston State	John L. Guidry Stadium; Thibodaux, LA	L 21–27	1,068	
November 18		at No. 17 McNeese State	Cowboy Stadium; Lake Charles, LA	L 7–12	5,000	
*Non-conference game; Rankings from The Sports Network Poll released prior to the game; All times are in Central time
