= 2000 UCF Golden Knights football team =

American college football season

2000 UCF Golden Knights football
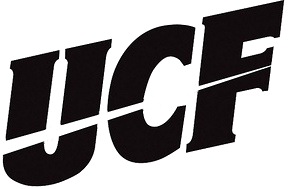
- Conference: Independent
- Record: 7–4
- Head coach: Mike Kruczek (3rd season)
- Defensive coordinator: Gene Chizik (3rd season)
- Home stadium: Florida Citrus Bowl

2000 NCAA Division I-A independents football records
| | Conf. | | | Overall |
| Team | W | | L | W | | L |
|---|---|---|---|---|---|---|
| No. 15 Notre Dame % | | – | | 9 | – | 3 |
| UCF | | – | | 7 | – | 4 |
| Middle Tennessee | | – | | 6 | – | 5 |
| Connecticut | | – | | 3 | – | 8 |
| Louisiana Tech | | – | | 3 | – | 9 |
| Louisiana–Lafayette | | – | | 1 | – | 10 |
| Louisiana–Monroe | | – | | 1 | – | 10 |
| Navy | | – | | 1 | – | 10 |
% – BCS at-large representative; Rankings from AP Poll

The 2000 UCF Golden Knights football team represented the University of Central Florida in the 2000 NCAA Division I-A football season. Their head coach was Mike Kruczek, who was in his third season with the team. The 2000 season marked the Golden Knights fifth year since ascending to the NCAA Division I Football Bowl Subdivision in 1996.

Quarterback Vic Penn was sidelined after four games with a separated shoulder. Redshirt freshman Ryan Schneider was elevated to starting quarterback, and won his first start, a 31–10 triumph over Eastern Michigan. During the season, UCF recorded its biggest win in program history at the time, when the Golden Knights upset the Alabama Crimson Tide 40–38 during their Homecoming on a last-second field goal by Javier Beorlegui. The victory was part of a mid-season streak where the Golden Knights won six out of seven games.

The season finale was a much-anticipated, nationally televised match-up hosting #8 Virginia Tech. A crowd of 50,220 fans packed the Citrus Bowl, and Hokies quarterback Michael Vick sat out with an ankle injury. Mistakes ruled the day, as Ryan Schneider threw four interceptions, and the Hokies jumped out to a 30–7 halftime lead. Lee Suggs rushed for five touchdowns, as the Knights fell 44–21.

Despite a strong 7–4 record, the Golden Knights were not selected for a bowl at the end of the season. The lack of a conference affiliation worked heavily against UCF's favor, and rumors of a possible invitation to the Las Vegas Bowl never came to fruition.

== Schedule ==
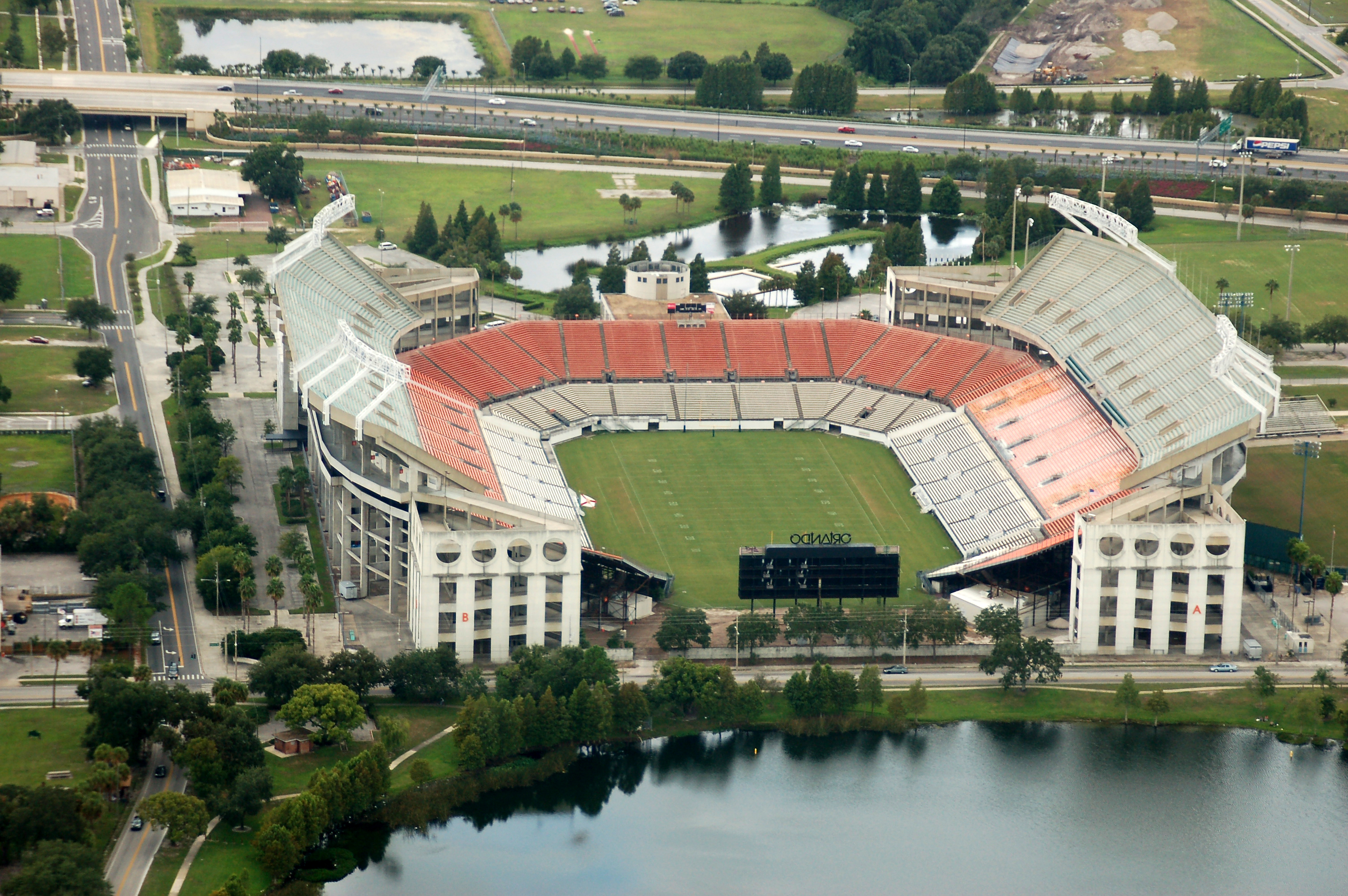
The Citrus Bowl, the Knights home field

| Date | Time | Opponent | Site | TV | Result | Attendance | Source |
|---|---|---|---|---|---|---|---|
| September 2 | 7:00 pm | at Georgia Tech | Bobby Dodd Stadium; Atlanta, GA | | L 17–21 | 40,993 | |
| September 9 | 6:00 pm | Northwestern State | Florida Citrus Bowl; Orlando, FL | | W 19–7 | 19,003 | |
| September 16 | 7:00 pm | at Akron | Rubber Bowl; Akron, OH | | L 24–35 | 12,964 | |
| September 23 | 6:00 pm | William & Mary | Citrus Bowl; Orlando, FL | | W 52–7 | 23,164 | |
| September 30 | 1:00 pm | at Eastern Michigan | Rynearson Stadium; Ypsilanti, MI | | W 31–10 | 10,238 | |
| October 7 | 2:00 pm | at Northern Illinois | Huskie Stadium; DeKalb, IL | | L 20–40 | 18,148 | |
| October 14 | 7:30 pm | Eastern Kentucky | Florida Citrus Bowl; Orlando, FL | | W 34–3 | 18,908 | |
| October 21 | 4:00 pm | Louisiana–Monroe^{†} | Florida Citrus Bowl; Orlando, FL | | W 55–0 | 25,093 | |
| October 28 | 3:00 pm | at Alabama | Bryant–Denny Stadium; Tuscaloosa, AL | SUN | W 40–38 | 83,818 | |
| November 4 | 7:00 pm | at Louisiana Tech | Joe Aillet Stadium; Ruston, LA | | W 20–16 | 12,532 | |
| November 11 | 6:00 pm | No. 8 Virginia Tech | Florida Citrus Bowl; Orlando, FL | ESPN | L 21–44 | 50,220 | |
^{†}Homecoming; Rankings from AP Poll released prior to the game; All times are in Eastern time

== Game summaries ==
=== October 28: at Alabama – "The Kick" ===
The Kick
- Non-conference game
| UCF Golden Knights | Alabama Crimson Tide |
| (5–3) | (3–4) |
| Independent | SEC |
| 40 | 38 |
| Head coach: Mike Kruczek | Head coach: Mike DuBose |
| | 1 | 2 | 3 | 4 | Total |
|---|---|---|---|---|---|
| UCF | 10 | 7 | 17 | 6 | 40 |
| Alabama | 14 | 10 | 0 | 14 | 38 |
- Date: October 28, 2000
- Season: 2000
- Stadium: Bryant–Denny Stadium
- Location: Tuscaloosa, Alabama
- Favorite: Alabama by 18½
- Attendance: 83,818

United States TV coverage
- Network: CSS/Sunshine Network

The UCF Golden Knights notched their first victory against an SEC team, and first victory against a major Division I-A school, defeating Alabama 40–38 at Bryant–Denny Stadium. Javier Beorlegui kicked a 37-yard field goal with 3 seconds remaining to defeat the Crimson Tide on homecoming. UCF entered the game as an 18½-point underdog, and 0–9 against the SEC. They were coming off a 55–0 blowout win over Louisiana–Monroe, and in their fifth season as a Division I-A Independent, were still looking for their first major victory. They left with their program's biggest win to-date. UCF picked off quarterback Andrew Zow four times, forced a fumble, and scored 27 points off of turnovers. They delivered Alabama's largest homecoming loss, and it was the most points the Crimson Tide surrendered at Bryant–Denny Stadium since 1951. A few days after the game, Alabama head coach Mike DuBose was fired after the stunning loss, but was allowed to finish out the season. The game is sometimes known in UCF circles as "The Kick" or "The Drive", and was seen as a major milestone for the program. It is considered one of the greatest games in UCF Knights history.

==== First quarter ====
UCF won the coin toss and deferred to the second half. Alabama took the opening kickoff, but on the fourth play of the game, Josh McKibben tipped and intercepted Andrew Zow, giving the Golden Knights the ball at the Alabama 20 yard line. Edward Mack took a draw play handoff 16 yards to the 4, setting up 1st & Goal. Ryan Schneider threw a 4-yard touchdown pass to Kenny Clark, and UCF led 7–0. The two teams traded punts, then Alabama took over at their own 14 yard line. Zow threw his second interception of the first quarter, this time picked off by Elliot Shorter and returned to the 19 yard line. The Crimson Tide defense stiffened, and kept UCF out of the endzone. Javier Beorlegui kicked a 26-yard field goal, and UCF extended their lead to 10–0.

Alabama shifted to rushing attack. Four Brandon Miree rushes gained 36 yards. Then Miree broke free for a 37-yard touchdown run to put Alabama on the board. The score was 10–7. UCF went three-and-out on their next drive, and punted back to Alabama. Andrew Zow tossed a tight end screen to Shawn Draper, who broke away for a 56-yard touchdown, and the Crimson Tide took a 14–10 lead with 2 seconds left in the quarter.

==== Second quarter ====
Ryan Schneider was picked off by Troy Dixon, leading to an Alabama field goal. Trailing 17–10, the game started to unravel for UCF. On 1st & 10 at their own 20 yard line, Edward Mack fumbled and it was recovered by Milo Lewis. Lewis scooped up the ball and ran it back 22 yards for a touchdown. The Crimson Tide stretched their lead to 24–10 at the 13:04 mark of the second quarter.

With under six minutes to go, Alabama faced a 4th & 11 at the UCF 35. Head coach Mike DuBose passed up on long field goal attempt, and sent out the punting unit. Lane Bearden's coffin corner punt pinned UCF inside their own 2 yard line with 5:33 left. DuBose was later questioned for not attempting the field goal, but later defended his decision. Four quick completions by Schneider advanced the Golden Knights to near midfield. Facing 3rd & 11 at the Alabama 38, Schneider kept the drive alive with a clutch 13-yard completion to Jimmy Fryzel. Three plays later, he connected with Tyson Hinshaw for a 12-yard touchdown pass, and trimmed the deficit to 24–17. Hinshaw was sandwiched between two defenders and lost his helmet, but still held on to the ball. The Golden Knights drove 98 yards in 11 plays, regained momentum, and trailed by 7 at halftime.

==== Third quarter ====
UCF got the ball to start the second half. The Golden Knights drove 79 yards in 14 plays to tie the score at 24–24. Twice the Knights seemingly turned the ball over, but both times the turnovers were nullified by Alabama penalties. On the second play of the drive, Ryan Schneider's pass to Jimmy Fryzel fell incomplete, but a pass interference penalty gave UCF a first down. UCF crossed midfield, and on 1st & 10 at the Alabama 40, Omari Howard took a handoff 7 yards to the 33. He lost the ball, but Alabama was offside on the play, and UCF maintained possession. UCF stumbled, committing two false starts, and faced 3rd & 20 at the 45. Schneider's pass was intercepted Reggie Myles, but it too was negated by another pass interference call on defender Kecalf Bailey. A total of 56 penalty yards by Alabama benefitted UCF on the drive. Schneider capped the drive off with a 9-yard touchdown pass to a wide open and unguarded Tyson Hinshaw, who scurried along the right sidelines untouched for the score.

After another Alabama penalty, this time Roughing the kicker on the extra point attempt, UCF kicked off to the Crimson Tide. On the third play of the drive, Davin Bush intercepted Andrew Zow, and tight-roped down the sidelines 47 yards for a go-ahead touchdown. UCF retook the lead 31–24. Alabama got a big gain on their next drive. Dustin McClintock ran up the middle for 34 yards, dragging defenders Asante Samuel and Damian Demps all the way to the UCF 34. However, the drive was snuffed out by yet another turnover. Zow and Antonio Carter fumbled away the exchange and it was recovered by UCF at the 41. But this time the turnover did not lead to any points.

UCF went three-and-out, and still led 31–24. Late in the third quarter, the Tide was pinned back at their 8 yard line. UCF intercepted Zow for the fourth time. The pass sailed high, and right into the hands of Damian Demps. The Golden Knights got inside the 10 yard line, but Ryan Schneider was sacked on 3rd & Goal. Javier Beorlegui's second field goal of the day gave UCF a 34–24 lead.

==== Fourth quarter ====
The fourth quarter started with UCF driving into Alabama territory. Beorlegui's 27-yard field goal, his third of the day, stretched UCF's lead to 37–24 with 11:01 left in the fourth quarter. The Golden Knights had scored 27 unanswered points.

Alabama rallied in the fourth quarter, putting up two touchdowns on their next two drives. Zow found Dre Fulgham on a crossing route, who broke free down the left sideline for a 46-yard gain to the UCF 20. Ahmaad Galloway's 2-yard touchdown run made the score 37–31. UCF next drive stalled at the Alabama 40, and they were forced to punt (it resulted in a touchback). With 5:24 left in the game, Alabama took over at their own 20, and drove 80 yards in plays. Zow's pass to Jason McAddley for 32 yards advanced the Crimson Tide to the 15 yard line. A personal foul penalty (elbow to the head) was added to the play, giving them a 1st & Goal at the UCF 7. Two plays later, Dustin McClintock caught a play-action pass from Zow, and dove to the pylon for a touchdown to put Alabama ahead 38–37 with only 2:24 left in regulation.

Alabama kicked off to UCF. Schneider completed passes to Corey Baker and Jimmy Fryzel, then faced 3rd & 1 at the 43 with 1:26 on the clock. Omari Howard's 5-yard draw play gave UCF a first down at the 48. The next play was a busted play, as Schneider's pass was caught by Kenny Clark for a 2-yard loss. The clock ticked inside 1 minute as UCF lined up at their own 46 with no timeouts left. Schneider eluded a sack, and hit Tyson Hinshaw for a gain of 18 yards to the Alabama 36. It was the eighth catch for Hinshaw (108 yards), who was questionable going into the game, recovering from a dislocated shoulder. Hinshaw came down hard on his side, and was out for the rest of the game. On 1st & 10, Schneider threw a quick out-route to Tavirus Davis, who stepped out of bounds for a 3-yard gain. The clock was stopped with 28 seconds to go. On 2nd & 7, Schneider found Jimmy Fryzel for 7 yards, but Alabama was called for holding. UCF had a first down at the Alabama 23 with 24 seconds left. Corey Baker ran a draw play for 3 yards to the Alabama 20, then Schneider hurried up to spike the ball with 6 seconds left. Alabama took a timeout to ice the kicker, then the Golden Knights lined up on the right hash for the game-winning field goal attempt.

With long snapper Mike Hedge, and holder Jimmy Fryzel, Javier Beorlegui kicked a 37-yard field goal to win the game for UCF. It was Beorlegui's fourth field goal of the day, and the biggest of his UCF career. Alabama was flagged for being offside on the kick, but the penalty was declined. UCF was then flagged 15-yards for excessive celebration, and it was assessed on the ensuing kickoff. With still 3 seconds on the game clock, the Golden Knights sweated out the kickoff. The Alabama special teams unit desperately tried to make something happen on the return, lateraling the ball several times, but they were eventually tackled and the game was over.
