= 2001 Fiesta Bowl =

2001 Tostitos Fiesta Bowl
- BCS Bowl Game; 30th Fiesta Bowl
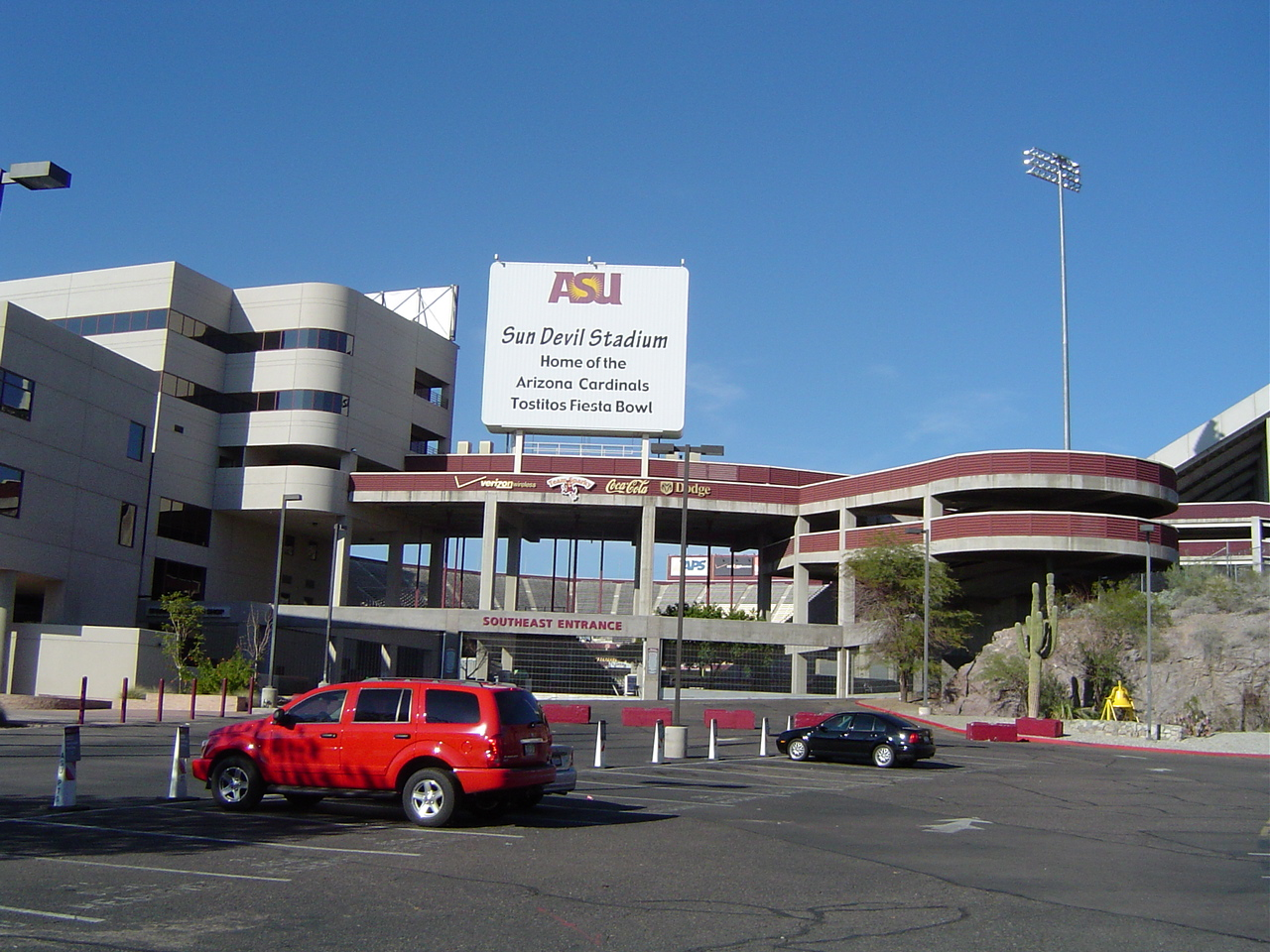
- Sun Devil Stadium in Tempe, Arizona, hosted the Fiesta Bowl.
Oregon State Beavers	Notre Dame Fighting Irish
(10–1)	(9–2)
Pac-10	Independent
41	9
Head coach: Dennis Erickson	Head coach: Bob Davie
AP / Coaches / BCS; 5 / 6 / 6	AP / Coaches / BCS; 10 / 10 / 11
	1	2	3	4	Total
Oregon State	3	9	29	0	41
Notre Dame	0	3	0	6	9
- Date: January 1, 2001
- Season: 2000
- Stadium: Sun Devil Stadium
- Location: Tempe, Arizona
- MVP: Jonathan Smith (QB, OSU); Darnell Robinson (LB, OSU)
- Favorite: Oregon State by 3½ points
- Referee: John Smith (Big East)
- Halftime show: Chandlerp.
- Attendance: 75,428

United States TV coverage
- Network: ABC
- Announcers: Sean McDonough, Ed Cunningham
- Nielsen ratings: 10.7

International TV coverage
- Network: ABC

The 2001 Tostitos Fiesta Bowl, played on January 1, was the thirtieth edition of the Fiesta Bowl and part of the BCS bowl schedule of the 2000 NCAA Division I-A football season. Held on New Year's Day at Sun Devil Stadium in Tempe, Arizona, the night game matched the fifth-ranked Oregon State Beavers of the Pac-10 Conference and the #10 Notre Dame Fighting Irish, an independent.

Oregon State quarterback Jonathan Smith threw for 305 yards and three touchdowns to lead the favored Beavers to a 41–9 rout. Wide receiver Chad Johnson had two touchdown receptions, and future Cincinnati Bengals teammate T. J. Houshmandzadeh caught the other. Ken Simonton added 85 yards rushing and a touchdown. The Beavers led 12–3 at halftime, then scored 29 points in an eight-minute stretch of the third quarter to put the game away, including a score on an unusual play where OSU's Terrell Roberts recovered teammate Houshmandzadeh's fumble on a punt return and himself ran 45 yards to complete the return touchdown. Notre Dame's sole touchdown came with under seven minutes remaining in the game which completed the scoring.

Smith was named the offensive player of the game, and Beavers linebacker Darnell Robinson, who recorded two sacks, forced a fumble, and made an interception, was the defensive player of the game. The Beavers won despite being penalized 18 times for 174 yards, which set a school and Fiesta Bowl record.

Oregon State (11–1) was ranked fourth in the final AP poll, which remains the highest in the history of the OSU program. Notre Dame (9–3) fell to fifteenth after its fifth consecutive bowl loss, a streak which reached nine.
