= 2000 Louisiana–Monroe Indians football team =

American college football season

2000 Louisiana–Monroe Indians football
- Conference: Independent
- Record: 1–10
- Head coach: Bobby Keasler (2nd season)
- Offensive coordinator: Roger Carr (2nd season)
- Defensive coordinator: Mike Collins (2nd season)
- Home stadium: Malone Stadium

2000 NCAA Division I-A independents football records
	Conf.			Overall
Team	W		L	W		L
No. 15 Notre Dame %		–		9	–	3
UCF		–		7	–	4
Middle Tennessee		–		6	–	5
Connecticut		–		3	–	8
Louisiana Tech		–		3	–	9
Louisiana–Lafayette		–		1	–	10
Louisiana–Monroe		–		1	–	10
Navy		–		1	–	10
% – BCS at-large representative; Rankings from AP Poll

The 2000 Louisiana–Monroe Indians football team represented the University of Louisiana at Monroe as an independent during the 2000 NCAA Division I-A football season. Led by second-year head coach Bobby Keasler, the Indians compiled a record of 1–10. Louisiana–Monroe's offense scored 96 points while the defense allowed 415 points. The team played home games at Malone Stadium in Monroe, Louisiana.

== Schedule ==
Date	Time	Opponent	Site	TV	Result	Attendance	Source
September 2	11:00 am	at Minnesota	Hubert H. Humphrey Metrodome; Minneapolis, MN		L 10–47	40,183	
September 9	7:00 pm	at Memphis	Liberty Bowl Memorial Stadium; Memphis, TN		L 0–28	20,801	
September 16	6:00 pm	Nicholls State	Malone Stadium; Monroe, LA		W 27–21	14,206	
September 23	3:00 pm	at No. 13 Tennessee	Neyland Stadium; Knoxville, TN	PPV	L 3–70	107,327	
September 30	6:00 pm	Southwest Texas State	Malone Stadium; Monroe, LA		L 7–27	8,178	
October 7	6:00 pm	at Arkansas	Razorback Stadium; Fayetteville, AR		L 6–52	50,947	
October 14	6:00 pm	at Middle Tennessee	Johnny "Red" Floyd Stadium; Murfreesboro, TN		L 0–28	17,427	
October 21	3:00 pm	at UCF	Florida Citrus Bowl; Orlando, FL		L 0–55	25,093	
November 4	6:00 pm	Louisiana–Lafayette^{†}	Malone Stadium; Monroe, LA (rivalry)		L 18–21	7,782	
November 11	6:00 pm	Louisiana Tech	Malone Stadium; Monroe, LA (rivalry)		L 19–42	14,756	
November 18	2:00 pm	Wofford	Malone Stadium; Monroe, LA		L 6–24	4,208	
^{†}Homecoming; Rankings from AP Poll released prior to the game; All times are in Central time
