= 2000 Connecticut Huskies football team =

American college football season

2000 Connecticut Huskies football
- Conference: Independent
- Record: 3–8
- Head coach: Randy Edsall (2nd season)
- Offensive coordinator: Dave Warner (2nd season)
- Offensive scheme: Multiple
- Defensive coordinator: Nick Rapone (2nd season)
- Base defense: 4–3
- Home stadium: Memorial Stadium

2000 NCAA Division I-A independents football records
	Conf.			Overall
Team	W		L	W		L
No. 15 Notre Dame %		–		9	–	3
UCF		–		7	–	4
Middle Tennessee		–		6	–	5
Connecticut		–		3	–	8
Louisiana Tech		–		3	–	9
Louisiana–Lafayette		–		1	–	10
Louisiana–Monroe		–		1	–	10
Navy		–		1	–	10
% – BCS at-large representative; Rankings from AP Poll

The 2000 Connecticut Huskies football team represented the University of Connecticut as an independent during the 2000 NCAA Division I-A football season. Led by second-year head coach Randy Edsall, the Huskies compiled a record of 3–8. This was the program's first season competing at the NCAA Division I-A level, having transitioned from NCAA Division I-AA, where Huskies were a member of the Atlantic 10 Conference. The Huskies competed as a transitional member as they increased the scholarship count to the Division I-A level of 85. The team played home games at Memorial Stadium in Storrs, Connecticut.

== Schedule ==
Date	Time	Opponent	Site	TV	Result	Attendance	Source
September 2	7:00 pm	at Eastern Michigan	Rynearson Stadium; Ypsilanti, MI	CPTV	L 25–32	11,148	
September 9	7:00 pm	Colgate	Memorial Stadium; Storrs, CT		W 27–7	16,632	
September 16	7:00 pm	at Buffalo	University at Buffalo Stadium; Amherst, NY	CPTV	W 24–21	13,678	
September 23	1:30 pm	Northeastern	Memorial Stadium; Storrs, CT		L 27–35	16,549	
September 30	7:00 pm	at Louisville	Papa John's Cardinal Stadium; Louisville, KY		L 22–41	38,121	
October 7	12:00 pm	at Boston College	Alumni Stadium; Chestnut Hill, MA	NESN	L 3–55	35,383	
October 21	7:00 pm	at Akron	Rubber Bowl; Akron, OH		W 38–35	6,467	
October 28	1:30 pm	South Florida^{†}	Memorial Stadium; Storrs, CT	ESPN Plus	L 13–21	16,585	
November 4	12:30 pm	Middle Tennessee	Memorial Stadium; Storrs, CT		L 10–66	11,115	
November 11	12:30 pm	Rhode Island	Memorial Stadium; Storrs, CT (rivalry)		L 21–26	9,951	
November 18	1:00 pm	at Ball State	Ball State Stadium; Muncie, IN		L 0–29	10,195	
^{†}Homecoming; All times are in Eastern time
