= 2000 Middle Tennessee Blue Raiders football team =

American college football season

2000 Middle Tennessee Blue Raiders football
- Conference: Independent
- Record: 6–5
- Head coach: Andy McCollum (2nd season)
- Offensive coordinator: Larry Fedora (2nd season)
- Defensive coordinator: Miles Aldridge (2nd season)
- Home stadium: Johnny "Red" Floyd Stadium

2000 NCAA Division I-A independents football records
	Conf.			Overall
Team	W		L	W		L
No. 15 Notre Dame %		–		9	–	3
UCF		–		7	–	4
Middle Tennessee		–		6	–	5
Connecticut		–		3	–	8
Louisiana Tech		–		3	–	9
Louisiana–Lafayette		–		1	–	10
Louisiana–Monroe		–		1	–	10
Navy		–		1	–	10
% – BCS at-large representative; Rankings from AP Poll

The 2000 Middle Tennessee Blue Raiders football team represented Middle Tennessee State University in the 2000 NCAA Division I-A football season.

== Schedule ==
Date	Opponent	Site	TV	Result	Attendance	Source
September 2	at No. 21 Illinois	Memorial Stadium; Champaign, IL		L 6–35	35,032	
September 9	at No. 8 Florida	Ben Hill Griffin Stadium; Gainesville, FL		L 0–55	84,311	
September 28	Murray State	Johnny "Red" Floyd Stadium; Murfreesboro, TN		W 44–28	12,037	
September 23	at Maryland	Byrd Stadium; College Park, MD		L 27–45	31,126	
October 7	Louisiana Tech	Johnny "Red" Floyd Stadium; Murfreesboro, TN		W 49–21	11,302	
October 14	Louisiana–Monroe	Johnny "Red" Floyd Stadium; Murfreesboro, TN		W 28–0	17,427	
October 21	at UAB	Legion Field; Birmingham, AL	CSS	L 9–14	13,000	
October 28	at No. 20 Mississippi State	Scott Field; Starkville, MS	CSS	L 35–61	42,933	
November 4	at Connecticut	Memorial Stadium; Storrs, CT		W 66–10	11,115	
November 11	South Florida	Johnny "Red" Floyd Stadium; Murfreesboro, TN		W 45–9	12,147	
November 18	Louisiana–Lafayette	Johnny "Red" Floyd Stadium; Murfreesboro, TN		W 41–38 ^{2OT}	7,913	
Rankings from AP Poll released prior to the game
