= Lawrence Hamilton (American football) =

American football player (born 1980)

No. 88, 84
- Position: Wide receiver

Personal information
- Born: August 31, 1980 (age 46); Marshall, Texas, U.S.
- Listed height: 6 ft 3 in (1.91 m)
- Listed weight: 204 lb (93 kg)

Career information
- High school: Marshall
- College: Stephen F. Austin (1998–2002)
- NFL draft: 2003: undrafted

Career history
- Arizona Cardinals (2003)*; Cincinnati Bengals (2003); New York Jets (2003); Arizona Cardinals (2004)
- * Offseason or practice squad member only
- Stats at Pro Football Reference

Lawrence Earl Hamilton Jr. (born August 31, 1980) is an American former professional football wide receiver who played in the National Football League (NFL) with the Cincinnati Bengals and Arizona Cardinals. He played college football for the Stephen F. Austin Lumberjacks.

== Early life ==
Lawrence Earl Hamilton Jr. was born on August 31, 1980, in Marshall, Texas. He played high school football and basketball at Marshall High School.

== College career ==
Hamilton played college football for the Stephen F. Austin Lumberjacks of Stephen F. Austin State University from 1999 to 2002. He was redshirted in 1998. He only played in one game in 2002 due to a broken ankle. Hamilton finished his college career with 87 receptions for 1,609 yards and 13 touchdowns.

== Professional career ==
After going undrafted in the 2003 NFL draft, Hamilton signed with the Arizona Cardinals on May 2, 2003. He was waived on August 5, 2003.

Hamilton was claimed off waivers by the Cincinnati Bengals on August 6, 2003. He had a 68-yard touchdown catch for the Bengals during the preseason. He played in five games, starting one, for Cincinnati during the 2003 season, recording no receptions on three targets. Hamilton was waived on October 16 and signed to the team's practice squad on October 18.

On December 8, 2003, Hamilton was signed to the New York Jets' active roster off of the Bengals practice squad. He did not play in any games for the Jets and became a free agent after the 2003 season. He re-signed with New York on March 22, 2004. Hamilton was waived on August 23, 2004.

Hamilton was claimed off waivers by the Arizona Cardinals on August 24, 2004. He was waived on September 5 and signed to Arizona's practice squad on September 7. He was promoted to the active roster on December 15, 2004, and appeared in one game for the Cardinals that season without recording any statistics. Hamilton was waived on August 22, 2005.
