= 2000 Southwest Texas State Bobcats football team =

American college football season

2000 Southwest Texas State Bobcats football
- Conference: Southland Football League
- Record: 7–4 (5–2 Southland)
- Head coach: Bob DeBesse (4th season)
- Defensive coordinator: David Bailiff (4th season)
- Home stadium: Bobcat Stadium

2000 Southland Football League standings
| | Conf. | | | Overall |
| Team | W | | L | W | | L |
|---|---|---|---|---|---|---|
| No. 9 Troy State $^ | 7 | – | 0 | 10 | – | 2 |
| No. 16 McNeese State ^ | 5 | – | 2 | 8 | – | 4 |
| No. 25 Southwest Texas State | 5 | – | 2 | 7 | – | 4 |
| Sam Houston State | 4 | – | 3 | 7 | – | 4 |
| Stephen F. Austin | 3 | – | 4 | 6 | – | 5 |
| Jacksonville State | 2 | – | 5 | 4 | – | 6 |
| Northwestern State | 1 | – | 6 | 4 | – | 7 |
| Nicholls State | 1 | – | 6 | 2 | – | 9 |
$ – Conference champion; ^ – NCAA Division I-AA playoff participant; Northwestern State forfeited conference wins over Troy State and Nicholls State.; Rankings from The Sports Network poll

The 2000 Southwest Texas State Bobcats football team was an American football team that represented Southwest Texas State University (now known as Texas State University) during the 2000 NCAA Division I-AA football season as a member of the Southland Football League. In their fourth year under head coach Bob DeBesse, the team compiled an overall record of 7–4 with a mark of 5–2 in conference play.

== Schedule ==
| Date | Opponent | Site | Result | Attendance | Source |
|---|---|---|---|---|---|
| August 31 | Midwestern State* | Bobcat Stadium; San Marcos, TX | W 34–13 | 13,434 | |
| September 9 | Cal State Northridge* | Bobcat Stadium; San Marcos, TX | L 13–19 ^{OT} | 12,528 | |
| September 16 | at Oklahoma State* | Lewis Field; Stillwater, OK | L 0–23 | 40,050 | |
| September 30 | at Louisiana–Monroe* | Malone Stadium; Monroe, LA | W 27–7 | 8,178 | |
| October 7 | Nicholls State | Bobcat Stadium; San Marcos, TX (rivalry) | W 25–0 | 11,277 | |
| October 12 | at No. 12 Troy State | Veterans Memorial Stadium; Troy, AL | L 7–31 | 15,779 | |
| October 21 | Jacksonville State | Bobcat Stadium; San Marcos, TX | W 28–24 | 13,072 | |
| October 28 | Northwestern State | Bobcat Stadium; San Marcos, TX | W 21–10 | 10,503 | |
| November 4 | at No. 17 McNeese State | Cowboy Stadium; Lake Charles, LA | L 3–18 | 11,606 | |
| November 11 | Stephen F. Austin | Bobcat Stadium; San Marcos, TX | W 38–21 | 13,689 | |
| November 18 | at Sam Houston State | Bowers Stadium; Huntsville, TX (rivalry) | W 24–17 | 1,017 | |
*Non-conference game; Rankings from The Sports Network Poll released prior to the game
