= 2000 Troy State Trojans football team =

American college football season

2000 Troy State Trojans football

Southland champion

NCAA Division I-AA First Round, L 30–33 vs. Appalachian State
- Conference: Southland Football League

Ranking
- Sports Network: No. 9
- Record: 10–2 (7–0 Southland)
- Head coach: Larry Blakeney (10th season)
- Offensive coordinator: Don Jacobs (10th season)
- Defensive coordinator: Wayne Bolt (4th season)
- Base defense: 4–3
- Home stadium: Veterans Memorial Stadium

2000 Southland Football League standings
	Conf.			Overall
Team	W		L	W		L
No. 9 Troy State $^	7	–	0	10	–	2
No. 16 McNeese State ^	5	–	2	8	–	4
No. 25 Southwest Texas State	5	–	2	7	–	4
Sam Houston State	4	–	3	7	–	4
Stephen F. Austin	3	–	4	6	–	5
Jacksonville State	2	–	5	4	–	6
Northwestern State	1	–	6	4	–	7
Nicholls State	1	–	6	2	–	9
$ – Conference champion; ^ – NCAA Division I-AA playoff participant; Northwestern State forfeited conference wins over Troy State and Nicholls State.; Rankings from The Sports Network poll

The 2000 Troy State Trojans football team represented Troy State University—now known as Troy University—as a member of the Southland Football League during the 2000 NCAA Division I-AA football season. Led by tenth-year head coach Larry Blakeney, the Trojans finished the season with an overall record of 9–3 and a mark of 6–1 in conference play, winning the Southland title. For the third consecutive season and the seventh time in eight years, Troy State advanced to the NCAA Division I-AA Football Championship playoffs, losing to Appalachian State in the first round. The Trojans finished the season ranked No. 9 in the Sports Network poll. The team played home games at Veterans Memorial Stadium in Troy, Alabama.

In the spring of 2001, Northwestern State forfeited two wins from the 2000 season, over Troy State and Nicholls State, because an ineligible player had participated for the Demons in those games. With the forfeit, the Trojans' record improved to 10–2 overall and 7–0 in conference play.

== Schedule ==
Date	Opponent	Rank	Site	Result	Attendance	Source
September 2	at Alabama A&M*	No. 3	Louis Crews Stadium; Normal, AL	W 28–13	9,771	
September 9	at No. 4 Appalachian State*	No. 2	Kidd Brewer Stadium; Boone, NC	W 34–28	16,631	
September 16	Alabama State*	No. 1	Veterans Memorial Stadium; Troy, AL	W 62–19	21,316	
September 30	at South Florida*	No. 1	Raymond James Stadium; Tampa, FL	L 10–20	25,786	
October 7	at No. 10 Northwestern State	No. 5	Harry Turpin Stadium; Natchitoches, LA	W 17–24 (forfeit)	12,261	
October 12	Southwest Texas State	No. 12	Veterans Memorial Stadium; Troy, AL	W 31–7	15,779	
October 21	at No. 22 Sam Houston State	No. 10	Bowers Stadium; Huntsville, TX	W 23–21	5,600	
October 28	Nicholls State	No. 10	Veterans Memorial Stadium; Troy, AL	W 41–12	17,547	
November 4	at Stephen F. Austin	No. 7	Homer Bryce Stadium; Nacogdoches, TX	W 6–0	4,806	
November 11	No. 16 McNeese State	No. 3	Veterans Memorial Stadium; Troy, AL	W 20–16	15,715	
November 18	at Jacksonville State	No. 3	Paul Snow Stadium; Jacksonville, AL (Battle for the Ol' School Bell)	W 28–0	5,717	
November 25	No. 14 Appalachian State*	No. 3	Veterans Memorial Stadium; Troy, AL (NCAA Division I-AA First Round)	L 30–33	4,916	
*Non-conference game; Rankings from The Sports Network Poll released prior to the game
