= 2000 Jacksonville State Gamecocks football team =

American college football season

2000 Jacksonville State Gamecocks football
- Conference: Southland Football League
- Record: 4–6 (2–5 Southland)
- Head coach: Jack Crowe (1st season)
- Offensive coordinator: Willie J. Slater (1st season)
- Defensive coordinator: Greg Stewart (1st season)
- Home stadium: Paul Snow Stadium

2000 Southland Football League standings
	Conf.			Overall
Team	W		L	W		L
No. 9 Troy State $^	7	–	0	10	–	2
No. 16 McNeese State ^	5	–	2	8	–	4
No. 25 Southwest Texas State	5	–	2	7	–	4
Sam Houston State	4	–	3	7	–	4
Stephen F. Austin	3	–	4	6	–	5
Jacksonville State	2	–	5	4	–	6
Northwestern State	1	–	6	4	–	7
Nicholls State	1	–	6	2	–	9
$ – Conference champion; ^ – NCAA Division I-AA playoff participant; Northwestern State forfeited conference wins over Troy State and Nicholls State.; Rankings from The Sports Network poll

The 2000 Jacksonville State Gamecocks football team represented Jacksonville State University as a member of the Southland Football League during the 2000 NCAA Division I-AA football season. Led by First-year head coach Jack Crowe, the Gamecocks compiled an overall record of 4–6 with a mark of 2–5 in conference play, placing sixth in the Southland. Jacksonville State played home games at Paul Snow Stadium in Jacksonville, Alabama.

== Schedule ==
Date	Time	Opponent	Site	Result	Attendance	Source
September 2	7:00 p.m.	at South Florida*	Raymond James Stadium; Tampa, FL	L 0–40	30,043	
September 9	6:30 p.m.	at Nicholls State	John L. Guidry Stadium; Thibodaux, LA	W 10–3	13,211	
September 21	7:00 p.m.	Samford*	Paul Snow Stadium; Jacksonville, AL (rivalry)	W 36–16	14,127	
October 7	2:00 p.m.	Sam Houston State	Paul Snow Stadium; Jacksonville, AL	L 23–26	8,468	
October 14	7:00 p.m.	at No. 22 McNeese State	Cowboy Stadium; Lake Charles, LA	L 0–28	15,021	
October 21	3:00 p.m.	at Southwest Texas State	Bobcat Stadium; San Marcos, TX	L 24–28	13,072	
October 26	2:00 p.m.	Stephen F. Austin	Paul Snow Stadium; Jacksonville, AL	L 21–27	5,400	
November 4	4:00 p.m.	No. 10 Northwestern State	Paul Snow Stadium; Jacksonville, AL	W 28–24	15,500	
November 11	4:00 p.m.	at Louisiana–Lafayette*	Cajun Field; Lafayette, LA	W 28–14	8,595	
November 18	7:00 p.m.	No. 3 Troy State	Paul Snow Stadium; Jacksonville, AL (Battle for the Ol' School Bell)	L 0–28	7,152	
*Non-conference game; Rankings from The Sports Network Poll released prior to the game; All times are in Central time
