= Anthony Denman =

American football player (born 1979)

No. 55, 56
- Position: Linebacker

Personal information
- Born: October 30, 1979 (age 47); Lufkin, Texas, U.S.
- Listed height: 6 ft 1 in (1.85 m)
- Listed weight: 235 lb (107 kg)

Career information
- High school: Rusk (Rusk, Texas)
- College: Notre Dame
- NFL draft: 2001: 7th round, 213th overall pick

Career history
- Jacksonville Jaguars (2001)*; Cleveland Browns (2001–2002); Buffalo Bills (2002)
- * Offseason or practice squad member only

Awards and highlights
- Second-team All-American (2000)
- Stats at Pro Football Reference

Anthony Ray Denman (born October 30, 1979) is an American former professional football player who was a linebacker for two seasons in the National Football League (NFL) with the Cleveland Browns and Buffalo Bills. He was selected by the Jacksonville Jaguars in the seventh round of the 2003 NFL draft. He played college football for the Notre Dame Fighting Irish.

== Early life ==
Denman earned four letters playing high school football at Rusk High School in Rusk, Texas. He spent time at running back, quarterback, linebacker, defensive line and fullback during high school. He garnered all-state allocates his senior season in 1996 after rushing for 1,250 yards and 12 touchdowns on offense while recording 85 tackles and one sack on defense. Denman was also team captain as a senior. He earned first-team all-East Texas and all-district honors his junior and senior seasons. He rushed for 1,428 yards and 20 touchdowns as junior in 1995. Denman also earned three letters in track and field.

== College career ==
Denman played at the University of Notre Dame from 1997 to 2000, recording career totals of 207 tackles and nine sacks. He earned Associated Press second-team All-American honors in 2000. He was also the Fighting Irish's MVP and a team captain his senior year in 2000.

== Professional career ==
Denman was selected by the Jacksonville Jaguars of the NFL in the seventh round with the 213th pick in the 2001 NFL draft and signed with the team on June 7, 2001. He was released by the Jaguars on August 27, 2001.

Denman signed with the Cleveland Browns of the NFL on August 28, 2001, and was released by the team on September 2. He was signed to the Browns' practice squad on September 7 and promoted to the active roster on September 19. He played in eleven games for the Browns during the 2001 season. Denman was released by the Browns on September 1, 2002.

Denman was signed by the Buffalo Bills of the NFL on September 3, 2002. He played in sixteen games for the Bills in 2002.
