= 2000 Sam Houston State Bearkats football team =

American college football season

2000 Sam Houston State Bearkats football
- Conference: Southland Football League
- Record: 7–4 (4–3 Southland)
- Head coach: Ron Randleman (19th season)
- Defensive coordinator: Mike Lucas (11th season)
- Home stadium: Bowers Stadium

2000 Southland Football League standings
	Conf.			Overall
Team	W		L	W		L
No. 9 Troy State $^	7	–	0	10	–	2
No. 16 McNeese State ^	5	–	2	8	–	4
No. 25 Southwest Texas State	5	–	2	7	–	4
Sam Houston State	4	–	3	7	–	4
Stephen F. Austin	3	–	4	6	–	5
Jacksonville State	2	–	5	4	–	6
Northwestern State	1	–	6	4	–	7
Nicholls State	1	–	6	2	–	9
$ – Conference champion; ^ – NCAA Division I-AA playoff participant; Northwestern State forfeited conference wins over Troy State and Nicholls State.; Rankings from The Sports Network poll

The 2000 Sam Houston State Bearkats football team represented Sam Houston State University as a member of the Southland Football League during the 2000 NCAA Division I-AA football season. Led by 19th-year head coach Ron Randleman, the Bearkats compiled an overall record of 7–4 with a mark of 4–3 in conference play, and finished fourth in the Southland.

== Schedule ==
Date	Time	Opponent	Rank	Site	Result	Attendance	Source
September 2		at Louisiana–Lafayette*		Cajun Field; Lafayette, LA	W 21–14	15,728	
September 7		Southeastern Oklahoma State*		Bowers Stadium; Huntsville, TX	W 44–0	7,000	
September 16	1:05 p.m.	at No. 19 Western Illinois*	No. 23	Hanson Field; Macomb, IL	L 0–31	5,934	
September 23		Texas A&M–Kingsville*		Bowers Stadium; Huntsville, TX	W 38–7	10,000	
October 7		at Jacksonville State		Paul Snow Stadium; Jacksonville, AL	W 26–23	8,468	
October 14		at No. 24 Stephen F. Austin		Homer Bryce Stadium; Nacogdoches, TX (Battle of the Piney Woods)	W 52–41	13,473	
October 21		No. 10 Troy State	No. 22	Bowers Stadium; Huntsville, TX	L 21–23	5,600	
October 28		No. 21 McNeese State		Bowers Stadium; Huntsville, TX	L 17–31	10,017	
November 4		at Nicholls State		John L. Guidry Stadium; Thibodaux, LA	W 27–21	1,068	
November 11		at No. 18 Northwestern State		Harry Turpin Stadium; Natchitoches, LA	W 27–13	5,036	
November 18		Southwest Texas State		Bowers Stadium; Huntsville, TX (rivalry)	L 17–24	1,017	
*Non-conference game; Rankings from The Sports Network Poll released prior to the game; All times are in Central time
