= 2000 Northwestern State Demons football team =

American college football season

2000 Northwestern State Demons football
- Conference: Southland Conference
- Record: 4–7, 2 wins forfeited (1–6 Southland, 2 wins forfeited)
- Head coach: Steve Roberts (1st season)
- Offensive coordinator: Doug Ruse (4th as OC, 7th overall season)
- Co-defensive coordinators: Kevin Coreless (2nd as DC, 5th overall season); Jack Curtis (2nd as DC, 7th overall season)
- Home stadium: Harry Turpin Stadium

2000 Southland Football League standings
	Conf.			Overall
Team	W		L	W		L
No. 9 Troy State $^	7	–	0	10	–	2
No. 16 McNeese State ^	5	–	2	8	–	4
No. 25 Southwest Texas State	5	–	2	7	–	4
Sam Houston State	4	–	3	7	–	4
Stephen F. Austin	3	–	4	6	–	5
Jacksonville State	2	–	5	4	–	6
Northwestern State	1	–	6	4	–	7
Nicholls State	1	–	6	2	–	9
$ – Conference champion; ^ – NCAA Division I-AA playoff participant; Northwestern State forfeited conference wins over Troy State and Nicholls State.; Rankings from The Sports Network poll

The 2000 Northwestern State Demons football team represented Northwestern State University as a member of the Southland Conference during the 2000 NCAA Division I-AA football season. Led by first-year head coach Steve Roberts, the Demons compiled an overall record of 6–5 with a mark of 3–4 in conference play, tying in fifth place in the Southland. Northwestern State played home games at Harry Turpin Stadium in Natchitoches, Louisiana.

In the spring of 2001, Northwestern State forfeited two wins from the 2000 season, over Troy State and Nicholls State, because an ineligible player had participated for the Demons in those games. With the forfeit, the Demons' record dropped to 4–7 overall and 1–6 in conference play, tying in last place in the Southland.

== Schedule ==
Date	Time	Opponent	Rank	Site	Result	Attendance	Source
September 2		Southern*		Harry Turpin Stadium; Natchitoches, LA	W 31–20	17,528	
September 9	5:00 pm	at UCF*		Florida Citrus Bowl; Orlando, FL	L 7–19	19,003	
September 23		at Louisiana–Lafayette*		Cajun Field; Lafayette, LA	W 23–21	15,212	
September 30	6:00 pm	Gardner–Webb*		Harry Turpin Stadium; Natchitoches, LA	W 57–17	11,288	
October 7	6:00 pm	No. 5 Troy State	No. 10	Harry Turpin Stadium; Natchitoches, LA	L 24–17 (forfeited)	12,261	
October 14		at Nicholls State	No. 10	John L. Guidry Stadium; Thibodaux, LA (rivalry)	L 27–21 (forfeited)		
October 21		No. 17 McNeese State	No. 9	Harry Turpin Stadium; Natchitoches, LA (rivalry)	W 37–34	14,586	
October 28		at Southwest Texas State		Bobcat Stadium; San Marcos, TX	L 10–21	10,503	
November 4	4:00 pm	at Jacksonville State	No. 10	Paul Snow Stadium; Jacksonville, AL	L 24–28	15,500	
November 11		Sam Houston State	No. 18	Harry Turpin Stadium; Natchitoches, LA	L 13–27	5,036	
November 18	2:00 pm	at Stephen F. Austin		Homer Bryce Stadium; Nacogdoches, TX (rivalry)	L 3–17	2,317	
*Non-conference game; Rankings from The Sports Network Poll released prior to the game; All times are in Central time
