= 2000 Howard Bison football team =

American college football season

2000 Howard Bison football
- Conference: Mid-Eastern Athletic Conference
- Record: 3–8 (3–5 MEAC)
- Head coach: Steve Wilson (12th season)
- Home stadium: William H. Greene Stadium

2000 Mid-Eastern Athletic Conference football standings
	Conf.			Overall
Team	W		L	W		L
No. 14 Florida A&M $^	7	–	1	9	–	3
No. 20 Bethune–Cookman	6	–	2	9	–	2
No. 21 North Carolina A&T	6	–	2	8	–	3
Delaware State	5	–	3	7	–	4
Hampton	5	–	3	7	–	4
Howard	3	–	5	3	–	8
Norfolk State	2	–	6	3	–	8
South Carolina State	2	–	6	3	–	8
Morgan State	0	–	8	1	–	10
$ – Conference champion; ^ – NCAA Division I-AA playoff participant; Rankings from The Sports Network poll

The 2000 Howard Bison football team represented Howard University as a member of the Mid-Eastern Athletic Conference (MEAC) during the 2000 NCAA Division I-AA football season. Led by 12th-year head coach Steve Wilson, the Bison compiled an overall record of 3–8, with a conference record of 3–5, and finished sixth in the MEAC.

== Schedule ==
Date	Opponent	Site	Result	Attendance	Source
September 2	vs. Jackson State*	Soldier Field; Chicago, IL (Chicago Football Classic)	L 16–34	43,364	
September 9	vs. Hampton	Giants Stadium; East Rutherford, NJ (New York Urban League Football Classic, rivalry)	L 24–26	41,682	
September 16	at Maine*	Alfond Stadium; Orono, ME	L 21–38	5,153	
September 23	Morgan State	William H. Greene Stadium; Washington, DC (rivalry)	W 35–23	3,115	
September 30	at No. 4 Florida A&M	Bragg Memorial Stadium; Tallahassee, FL	L 0–43	15,650	
October 14	at Towson*	Minnegan Stadium; Towson, MD	L 6–38	4,512	
October 21	No. 14 North Carolina A&T	William H. Greene Stadium; Washington, DC	W 17–16	9,872	
October 28	Norfolk State	William H. Greene Stadium; Washington, DC	W 14–0	11,500	
November 4	at South Carolina State	Oliver C. Dawson Stadium; Orangeburg, SC	L 20–38	7,727	
November 11	No. 22 Bethune–Cookman	William H. Greene Stadium; Washington, DC	L 0–35		
November 18	Delaware State	William H. Greene Stadium; Washington, DC	L 37–64		
*Non-conference game; Rankings from The Sports Network Poll released prior to the game
