= 2000 Mississippi Valley State Delta Devils football team =

American college football season

2000 Mississippi Valley State Delta Devils football
- Conference: Southwestern Athletic Conference
- East Division
- Record: 3–8 (2–5 SWAC)
- Head coach: LaTraia Jones (2nd season)
- Offensive coordinator: Willie Totten (1st season)
- Home stadium: Rice–Totten Stadium

2000 Southwestern Athletic Conference football standings
	Conf.			Overall
Team	W		L	W		L
East Division
Alabama A&M xy	5	–	2	7	–	5
Alabama State x	5	–	2	6	–	5
Jackson State	4	–	3	7	–	4
Mississippi Valley State	1	–	6	2	–	9
Alcorn State	0	–	7	0	–	11
West Division
No. 13 Grambling State xy$	6	–	1	10	–	2
Texas Southern	5	–	2	8	–	3
Arkansas–Pine Bluff	4	–	3	6	–	5
Southern	4	–	3	6	–	5
Prairie View A&M	1	–	6	1	–	10
Championship: Grambling State 14, Alabama A&M 6
$ – Conference champion; x – Division champion/co-champions; y – Championship game participant; Rankings from The Sports Network Poll

The 2000 Mississippi Valley State Delta Devils football team represented Mississippi Valley State University as a member of the Southwestern Athletic Conference (SWAC) during the 2000 NCAA Division I-AA football season. Led by second-year head coach LaTraia Jones, the Delta Devils compiled an overall record of 3–8, with a conference record of 2–5, and finished fourth in the SWAC East Division.

== Schedule ==
Date	Opponent	Site	Result	Attendance	Source
August 26	at Louisiana Tech*	Joe Aillet Stadium; Ruston, LA	L 10–63	18,565	
September 2	Arkansas–Pine Bluff	Rice–Totten Stadium; Itta Bena, MS	L 7–40		
September 9	Delta State*	Rice–Totten Stadium; Itta Bena, MS	L 23–35		
September 16	at Chattanooga*	Finley Stadium; Chattanooga, TN	L 17–72	8,316	
September 23	Grambling State	Rice–Totten Field; Itta Bena, MS	L 13–49		
September 30	at Alabama A&M	Louis Crews Stadium; Normal, AL	L 12–26		
October 14	at Jackson State	Mississippi Veterans Memorial Stadium; Jackson, MS	L 20–64	15,526	
October 21	at Texas Southern	Robertson Stadium; Houston, TX	L 24–30		
October 28	Prairie View A&M	Rice–Totten Stadium; Itta Bena, MS	W 33–7		
November 4	Alcorn State	Rice–Totten Stadium; Itta Bena, MS	W 12–3		
November 11	at Alabama State	Cramton Bowl; Montgomery, AL	W 44–28 (ASU forfeit)		
*Non-conference game
