= 2000 Prairie View A&M Panthers football team =

American college football season

2000 Prairie View A&M Panthers football
- Conference: Southwestern Athletic Conference
- West Division
- Record: 2–9 (2–5 SWAC)
- Head coach: Larry Dorsey (1st season)
- Home stadium: Edward L. Blackshear Field; Reliant Astrodome

2000 Southwestern Athletic Conference football standings
	Conf.			Overall
Team	W		L	W		L
East Division
Alabama A&M xy	5	–	2	7	–	5
Alabama State x	5	–	2	6	–	5
Jackson State	4	–	3	7	–	4
Mississippi Valley State	1	–	6	2	–	9
Alcorn State	0	–	7	0	–	11
West Division
No. 13 Grambling State xy$	6	–	1	10	–	2
Texas Southern	5	–	2	8	–	3
Arkansas–Pine Bluff	4	–	3	6	–	5
Southern	4	–	3	6	–	5
Prairie View A&M	1	–	6	1	–	10
Championship: Grambling State 14, Alabama A&M 6
$ – Conference champion; x – Division champion/co-champions; y – Championship game participant; Rankings from The Sports Network Poll

The 2000 Prairie View A&M Panthers football team represented Prairie View A&M University as a member of the Southwestern Athletic Conference (SWAC) during the 2000 NCAA Division I-AA football season. Led by first-year head coach Larry Dorsey, the Panthers compiled an overall record of 2–9, with a mark of 2–5 in conference play, and finished fifth in the SWAC West Division.

== Schedule ==
Date	Time	Opponent	Site	Result	Attendance	Source
September 2		at Texas Southern	Reliant Astrodome; Houston, TX (Labor Day Classic)	L 0–42	26,384	
September 9		McNeese State*	Reliant Astrodome; Houston, TX	L 0–41	3,105	
September 16		Southern	Reliant Astrodome; Houston, TX	L 6–56	17,367	
September 23		Alabama A&M	Edward L. Blackshear Field; Prairie View, TX	L 10–49	4,011	
September 30		vs. Grambling State	Cotton Bowl; Dallas, TX (State Fair Classic)	L 7–47	65,125	
October 7		Alcorn State	Edward L. Blackshear Field; Prairie View, TX	W 25–22	1,031	
October 14		Alabama State	Edward L. Blackshear Field; Prairie View, TX	W 21–51 (ASU forfeit)		
October 21	1:00 p.m.	at Illinois State*	Hancock Stadium; Normal, IL	L 0–64	7,841	
October 28		at Mississippi Valley State	Rice–Totten Stadium; Itta Bena, MS	L 7–33		
November 4		at Arkansas–Pine Bluff	Golden Lion Stadium; Pine Bluff, AR	L 13–32		
November 11	7:05 p.m.	at No. 23 Northern Iowa*	UNI-Dome; Cedar Falls, IA	L 14–60	10,263	
*Non-conference game; Rankings from The Sports Network Poll released prior to the game; All times are in Central time
