= 2000 Delaware State Hornets football team =

American college football season

2000 Delaware State Hornets football
- Conference: Mid-Eastern Athletic Conference
- Record: 7–4 (5–3 MEAC)
- Head coach: Ben Blacknall (1st season)
- Home stadium: Alumni Stadium

2000 Mid-Eastern Athletic Conference football standings
| | Conf. | | | Overall |
| Team | W | | L | W | | L |
|---|---|---|---|---|---|---|
| No. 14 Florida A&M $^ | 7 | – | 1 | 9 | – | 3 |
| No. 20 Bethune–Cookman | 6 | – | 2 | 9 | – | 2 |
| No. 21 North Carolina A&T | 6 | – | 2 | 8 | – | 3 |
| Delaware State | 5 | – | 3 | 7 | – | 4 |
| Hampton | 5 | – | 3 | 7 | – | 4 |
| Howard | 3 | – | 5 | 3 | – | 8 |
| Norfolk State | 2 | – | 6 | 3 | – | 8 |
| South Carolina State | 2 | – | 6 | 3 | – | 8 |
| Morgan State | 0 | – | 8 | 1 | – | 10 |
$ – Conference champion; ^ – NCAA Division I-AA playoff participant; Rankings from The Sports Network poll

The 2000 Delaware State Hornets football team represented Delaware State University as a member of the Mid-Eastern Athletic Conference (MEAC) during the 2000 NCAA Division I-AA football season. Led by first-year head coach Ben Blacknall, the Hornets compiled an overall record of 7–4, with a mark of 5–3 in conference play, and finished tied for fourth in the MEAC.

== Schedule ==
| Date | Opponent | Site | Result | Attendance | Source |
|---|---|---|---|---|---|
| September 2 | No. 8 Florida A&M | Alumni Stadium; Dover, DE | L 21–49 | 3,851 | |
| September 9 | at Elon* | Burlington Memorial Stadium; Burlington, NC | L 6–45 | 5,191 | |
| September 16 | Fayetteville State* | Alumni Stadium; Dover, DE | W 45–10 | 2,133 | |
| September 23 | Liberty* | Alumni Stadium; Dover, DE | W 42–25 | 1,710 | |
| September 30 | Hampton | Alumni Stadium; Dover, DE | L 28–54 | 3,633 | |
| October 7 | at Bethune–Cookman | Municipal Stadium; Daytona Beach, FL | L 20–41 | 15,467 | |
| October 21 | Morgan State | Alumni Stadium; Dover, DE | W 20–12 | 3,962 | |
| October 28 | South Carolina State | Alumni Stadium; Dover, DE | W 57–32 | 6,352 | |
| November 4 | No. 18 North Carolina A&T | Alumni Stadium; Dover, DE | W 46–45 | 3,836 | |
| November 11 | at Norfolk State | William "Dick" Price Stadium; Norfolk, VA | W 31–28 | 3,426 | |
| November 18 | at Howard | William H. Greene Stadium; Washington, DC | W 64–37 | 1,057 | |
*Non-conference game; Rankings from The Sports Network Poll released prior to the game
