= 2000 South Carolina State Bulldogs football team =

American college football season

2000 South Carolina State Bulldogs football
- Conference: Mid-Eastern Athletic Conference
- Record: 3–8 (2–6 MEAC)
- Head coach: Willie Jeffries (18th season)
- Home stadium: Oliver C. Dawson Stadium

2000 Mid-Eastern Athletic Conference football standings
| | Conf. | | | Overall |
| Team | W | | L | W | | L |
|---|---|---|---|---|---|---|
| No. 14 Florida A&M $^ | 7 | – | 1 | 9 | – | 3 |
| No. 20 Bethune–Cookman | 6 | – | 2 | 9 | – | 2 |
| No. 21 North Carolina A&T | 6 | – | 2 | 8 | – | 3 |
| Delaware State | 5 | – | 3 | 7 | – | 4 |
| Hampton | 5 | – | 3 | 7 | – | 4 |
| Howard | 3 | – | 5 | 3 | – | 8 |
| Norfolk State | 2 | – | 6 | 3 | – | 8 |
| South Carolina State | 2 | – | 6 | 3 | – | 8 |
| Morgan State | 0 | – | 8 | 1 | – | 10 |
$ – Conference champion; ^ – NCAA Division I-AA playoff participant; Rankings from The Sports Network poll

The 2000 South Carolina State Bulldogs football team represented South Carolina State University as a member of the Mid-Eastern Athletic Conference (MEAC) during the 2000 NCAA Division I-AA football season. Led by 18th-year head coach Willie Jeffries, the Bulldogs compiled an overall record of 3–8, with a mark of 2–6 in conference play, and finished tied for seventh in the MEAC.

== Schedule ==
| Date | Opponent | Site | Result | Attendance | Source |
|---|---|---|---|---|---|
| September 2 | Winston-Salem State* | Oliver C. Dawson Stadium; Orangeburg, SC | L 28–39 | 8,187 | |
| September 9 | Savannah State* | Oliver C. Dawson Stadium; Orangeburg, SC | W 42–26 | | |
| September 16 | vs. No. 5 Florida A&M | Alltel Stadium; Jacksonville, FL (Orange Blossom–Palmetto Classic) | L 9–64 | 12,200 | |
| September 30 | at The Citadel* | Johnson Hagood Stadium; Charleston, SC | L 16–45 | 16,362 | |
| October 7 | at Norfolk State | William "Dick" Price Stadium; Norfolk, VA | L 21–24 | | |
| October 14 | at Bethune–Cookman | Municipal Stadium; Daytona Beach, FL | L 14–42 | 6,845 | |
| October 21 | Hampton | Oliver C. Dawson Stadium; Orangeburg, SC | L 37–40 | | |
| October 28 | at Delaware State | Alumni Stadium; Dover, DE | L 32–57 | | |
| November 4 | Howard | Oliver C. Dawson Stadium; Orangeburg, SC | W 38–20 | 7,727 | |
| November 11 | Morgan State | Oliver C. Dawson Stadium; Orangeburg, SC | W 57–37 | | |
| November 18 | vs. No. 20 North Carolina A&T | Ericsson Stadium; Charlotte, NC (Carolinas Classic, rivalry) | L 14–66 | 22,000 | |
*Non-conference game; Rankings from The Sports Network Poll released prior to the game
