= 2000 Southern Illinois Salukis football team =

American college football season

2000 Southern Illinois Salukis football
- Conference: Gateway Football Conference
- Record: 3–8 (2–4 Gateway)
- Head coach: Jan Quarless (4th season)
- Home stadium: McAndrew Stadium

2000 Gateway Football Conference standings
| | Conf. | | | Overall |
| Team | W | | L | W | | L |
|---|---|---|---|---|---|---|
| No. 12 Western Illinois $^ | 5 | – | 1 | 9 | – | 3 |
| No. 11 Youngstown State ^ | 4 | – | 2 | 9 | – | 3 |
| No. 24 Illinois State | 4 | – | 2 | 7 | – | 4 |
| No. 19 Northern Iowa | 3 | – | 3 | 7 | – | 4 |
| Southwest Missouri State | 2 | – | 4 | 5 | – | 6 |
| Southern Illinois | 2 | – | 4 | 3 | – | 8 |
| Indiana State | 1 | – | 5 | 1 | – | 10 |
$ – Conference champion; ^ – NCAA Division I-AA playoff participant; Rankings from The Sports Network poll

The 2000 Southern Illinois Salukis football team represented Southern Illinois University as a member of the Gateway Football Conference during the 2000 NCAA Division I-AA football season. They were led by fourth-year head coach Jan Quarless and played their home games at McAndrew Stadium in Carbondale, Illinois. The Salukis finished the season with a 3–8 record overall and a 2–4 record in conference play.

== Schedule ==
| Date | Time | Opponent | Site | TV | Result | Attendance | Source |
|---|---|---|---|---|---|---|---|
| August 31 | 6:00 p.m. | at Murray State* | Roy Stewart Stadium; Murray, KY | | L 20–42 | 7,068 | |
| September 9 | 1:30 p.m. | Southeast Missouri State* | McAndrew Stadium; Carbondale, IL | | L 33–34 | 8,000 | |
| September 16 | 12:30 p.m. | No. 16 Northern Iowa | McAndrew Stadium; Carbondale, IL | Gateway TV | W 34–14 | 4,500 | |
| September 23 | 6:00 p.m. | at Kansas* | Memorial Stadium; Lawrence, KS | | L 0–42 | 30,500 | |
| October 7 | 1:30 p.m. | No. 11 Western Illinois^{†} | McAndrew Stadium; Carbondale, IL | | L 17–42 | 10,000 | |
| October 14 | 1:30 p.m. | Drake* | McAndrew Stadium; Carbondale, IL | | W 35–23 | 6,500 | |
| October 21 | 1:30 p.m. | at Southwest Missouri State | Plaster Sports Complex; Springfield, MO | | L 9–27 | 13,785 | |
| October 28 | 1:00 p.m. | at Illinois State | Hancock Stadium; Normal, IL | | L 17–27 | 13,011 | |
| November 4 | 12:30 p.m. | Indiana State | McAndrew Stadium; Carbondale, IL | | L 22–23 | 1,000 | |
| November 11 | 12:00 p.m. | at No. 2 Youngstown State | Stambaugh Stadium; Youngstown, OH | | W 21–20 | 16,549 | |
| November 18 | | at No. 7 Western Kentucky* | L. T. Smith Stadium; Bowling Green, KY | | L 0–22 | 5,200 | |
*Non-conference game; ^{†}Homecoming; Rankings from The Sports Network Poll released prior to the game; All times are in Central time
