= 2000 Alabama State Hornets football team =

American college football season

2000 Alabama State Hornets football

SWAC East Division co-champion
- Conference: Southwestern Athletic Conference
- East Division
- Record: 0–11, 6 wins forfeited (0–7 SWAC, 5 wins forfeited)
- Head coach: L. C. Cole (1st season)
- Home stadium: Cramton Bowl

2000 Southwestern Athletic Conference football standings
	Conf.			Overall
Team	W		L	W		L
East Division
Alabama A&M xy	5	–	2	7	–	5
Alabama State x	5	–	2	6	–	5
Jackson State	4	–	3	7	–	4
Mississippi Valley State	1	–	6	2	–	9
Alcorn State	0	–	7	0	–	11
West Division
No. 13 Grambling State xy$	6	–	1	10	–	2
Texas Southern	5	–	2	8	–	3
Arkansas–Pine Bluff	4	–	3	6	–	5
Southern	4	–	3	6	–	5
Prairie View A&M	1	–	6	1	–	10
Championship: Grambling State 14, Alabama A&M 6
$ – Conference champion; x – Division champion/co-champions; y – Championship game participant; Rankings from The Sports Network Poll

The 2000 Alabama State Hornets football team represented Alabama State University as a member of the Southwestern Athletic Conference (SWAC) during the 2000 NCAA Division I-AA football season. Led by first-year head coach L. C. Cole, the Hornets compiled an overall record of 6–5, with a mark of 5–2 in conference play, finished as co-champion in the East Division of the SWAC. In December 2009, the NCAA ruled Alabama State to forfeit all victories from the 2000 season and this resulted in an official record of 0–11.

== Schedule ==
Date	Opponent	Site	Result	Attendance	Source
September 2	at Tennessee State*	Adelphia Coliseum; Nashville, TN	L 13–39	20,463	
September 9	at Alcorn State	Jack Spinks Stadium; Lorman, MS	L 35–28 (forfeit loss)	3,800	
September 16	at No. 1 Troy State*	Veterans Memorial Stadium; Troy, AL	L 19–62	21,316	
September 23	Arkansas–Pine Bluff	Cramton Bowl; Montgomery, AL	L 37–34 (forfeit loss)	9,647	
September 30	at Southern	A. W. Mumford Stadium; Baton Rouge, LA	L 37–33 (forfeit loss)		
October 7	vs. Jackson State	Ladd–Peebles Stadium; Mobile, AL (Gulf Coast Classic)	L 35–24 (forfeit loss)	13,000	
October 14	at Prairie View A&M	Edward L. Blackshear Field; Prairie View, TX	L 51–21 (forfeit loss)		
October 28	vs. Alabama A&M	Legion Field; Birmingham, AL (Magic City Classic)	L 27–34	61,147	
November 4	at No. 14 Grambling State	Eddie G. Robinson Memorial Stadium; Grambling, LA	L 2–20	12,954	
November 11	Mississippi Valley State	Cramton Bowl; Montgomery, AL	L 44–28 (forfeit loss)	11,500	
November 23	Tuskegee*	Cramton Bowl; Montgomery, AL (Turkey Day Classic)	L 27–28	26,100	
*Non-conference game; Rankings from The Sports Network Poll released prior to the game
