= 2000 Sacramento State Hornets football team =

American college football season

2000 Sacramento State Hornets football
- Conference: Big Sky Conference
- Record: 7–4 (5–3 Big Sky)
- Head coach: John Volek (6th season)
- Home stadium: Hornet Stadium

2000 Big Sky Conference football standings
	Conf.			Overall
Team	W		L	W		L
No. 2 Montana $^	8	–	0	13	–	2
No. 15 Portland State ^	5	–	3	8	–	4
No. 18 Weber State	5	–	3	7	–	4
Sacramento State	5	–	3	7	–	4
Eastern Washington	5	–	3	6	–	5
Idaho State	4	–	4	6	–	5
Cal State Northridge	2	–	6	4	–	7
Northern Arizona	2	–	6	3	–	8
Montana State	0	–	8	0	–	11
$ – Conference champion; ^ – NCAA Division I-AA playoff participant; Rankings from The Sports Network poll

The 2000 Sacramento State Hornets football team represented California State University, Sacramento as a member of the Big Sky Conference during the 2000 NCAA Division I-AA football season. Led by sixth-year head coach John Volek, Sacramento State compiled an overall record of 7–4 with a mark of 5–3 in conference play, placing in a four-way tie for second place in the Big Sky. They finished above .500 for the first time in Big Sky play. The team outscored its opponents 329 to 279 for the season. The Hornets played home games at Hornet Stadium in Sacramento, California.

== Schedule ==
Date	Opponent	Site	Result	Attendance	Source
September 2	at Saint Mary's*	Saint Mary's Stadium; Moraga, CA	W 24–21	4,348	
September 9	Cal Poly*	Hornet Stadium; Sacramento, CA	W 37–18	16,557	
September 16	No. 12 Portland State	Hornet Stadium; Sacramento, CA	L 23–35	11,853	
September 23	at Idaho State	Holt Arena; Pocatello, ID	L 39–41	5,638	
September 30	Weber State	Hornet Stadium; Sacramento, CA	W 35–7	9,157	
October 7	at No. 9 Montana	Washington–Grizzly Stadium; Missoula, MT	L 20–24	19,264	
October 14	Montana State	Hornet Stadium; Sacramento, CA	W 24–13	11,958	
October 21	at No. 25 Eastern Washington	Woodward Field; Cheney, WA	W 25–22	6,257	
October 28	at No. 1–West (D-II) UC Davis*	Toomey Field; Davis, CA (Causeway Classic)	L 10–13	9,700	
November 4	Cal State Northridge	Hornet Stadium; Sacramento, CA	W 64–61	7,912	
November 11	at Northern Arizona	Walkup Skydome; Flagstaff, AZ	W 28–24	2,011	
*Non-conference game; Rankings from The Sports Network Poll released prior to the game
