= 2000 Norfolk State Spartans football team =

American college football season

2000 Norfolk State Spartans football
- Conference: Mid-Eastern Athletic Conference
- Record: 3–8 (2–6 MEAC)
- Head coach: Mo Forte (2nd season)
- Home stadium: William "Dick" Price Stadium

2000 Mid-Eastern Athletic Conference football standings
| | Conf. | | | Overall |
| Team | W | | L | W | | L |
|---|---|---|---|---|---|---|
| No. 14 Florida A&M $^ | 7 | – | 1 | 9 | – | 3 |
| No. 20 Bethune–Cookman | 6 | – | 2 | 9 | – | 2 |
| No. 21 North Carolina A&T | 6 | – | 2 | 8 | – | 3 |
| Delaware State | 5 | – | 3 | 7 | – | 4 |
| Hampton | 5 | – | 3 | 7 | – | 4 |
| Howard | 3 | – | 5 | 3 | – | 8 |
| Norfolk State | 2 | – | 6 | 3 | – | 8 |
| South Carolina State | 2 | – | 6 | 3 | – | 8 |
| Morgan State | 0 | – | 8 | 1 | – | 10 |
$ – Conference champion; ^ – NCAA Division I-AA playoff participant; Rankings from The Sports Network poll

The 2000 Norfolk State Spartans football team represented Norfolk State University as a member of the Mid-Eastern Athletic Conference (MEAC) during the 2000 NCAA Division I-AA football season. Led by second-year head coach Mo Forte, the Spartans compiled an overall record of 3–8, with a conference record of 2–6, and finished tied for seventh in the MEAC.

== Schedule ==
| Date | Opponent | Site | Result | Attendance | Source |
|---|---|---|---|---|---|
| September 2 | Virginia State* | William "Dick" Price Stadium; Norfolk, VA | W 31–24 | 18,803 | |
| September 9 | vs. Bethune–Cookman | Lockhart Stadium; Fort Lauderdale, FL (South Florida Football Classic) | L 6–24 | | |
| September 16 | at No. 18 Villanova* | Villanova Stadium; Villanova, PA | L 0–42 | 8,275 | |
| September 30 | at No. 22 North Carolina A&T | Aggie Stadium; Greensboro, NC | L 0–16 | 15,175 | |
| October 7 | South Carolina State | William "Dick" Price Stadium; Norfolk, VA | W 24–21 | | |
| October 14 | at Hampton | Armstrong Stadium; Hampton, VA (rivalry) | L 19–47 | 14,141 | |
| October 21 | No. 21 Florida A&M | William "Dick" Price Stadium; Norfolk, VA | L 14–42 | 3,973 | |
| October 28 | at Howard | William H. Greene Stadium; Washington, DC | L 0–14 | 11,500 | |
| November 4 | Morgan State | William "Dick" Price Stadium; Norfolk, VA | W 19–14 | 9,316 | |
| November 11 | Delaware State | William "Dick" Price Stadium; Norfolk, VA | L 28–31 | 3,426 | |
| November 18 | vs. Texas Southern* | Qualcomm Stadium; San Diego, CA (Gold Coast Classic) | L 12–17 | 5,000 | |
*Non-conference game; Rankings from The Sports Network Poll released prior to the game
