= 2000 Morgan State Bears football team =

American college football season

2000 Morgan State Bears football
- Conference: Mid-Eastern Athletic Conference
- Record: 1–10 (0–8 MEAC)
- Head coach: Stanley Mitchell (2nd season)
- Home stadium: PSINet Stadium

2000 Mid-Eastern Athletic Conference football standings
	Conf.			Overall
Team	W		L	W		L
No. 14 Florida A&M $^	7	–	1	9	–	3
No. 20 Bethune–Cookman	6	–	2	9	–	2
No. 21 North Carolina A&T	6	–	2	8	–	3
Delaware State	5	–	3	7	–	4
Hampton	5	–	3	7	–	4
Howard	3	–	5	3	–	8
Norfolk State	2	–	6	3	–	8
South Carolina State	2	–	6	3	–	8
Morgan State	0	–	8	1	–	10
$ – Conference champion; ^ – NCAA Division I-AA playoff participant; Rankings from The Sports Network poll

The 2000 Morgan State Bears football team represented Morgan State University as a member of the Mid-Eastern Athletic Conference (MEAC) during the 2000 NCAA Division I-AA football season. Led by second-year head coach Stanley Mitchell, the Bears compiled an overall record of 1–10, with a mark of 0–8 in conference play, and finished ninth in the MEAC.

Morgan State only had one home game for the season as Hughes Stadium was closed for renovations for the entire season.

== Schedule ==
Date	Opponent	Site	Result	Attendance	Source
September 9	at No. 8 Florida A&M	Bragg Memorial Stadium; Tallahassee, FL	L 25–56	17,184	
September 16	at Towson*	Minnegan Stadium; Towson, MD (rivalry)	L 7–31	4,817	
September 23	at Howard	William H. Greene Stadium; Washington, DC (rivalry)	L 23–35	3,115	
September 30	vs. Bethune–Cookman	Thomas Robinson Stadium; Nassau, Bahamas (Conch Bowl Classic)	L 6–42	4,259	
October 7	at No. 21 North Carolina A&T	Aggie Stadium; Greensboro, NC	L 6–33	15,850	
October 14	Savannah State*^{†}	PSINet Stadium; Baltimore, MD	W 12–6	14,457	
October 21	at Delaware State	Alumni Stadium; Dover, DE	L 12–20		
October 28	at No. 3 Western Illinois*	Hanson Field; Macomb, IL	L 17–73	4,839	
November 4	at Norfolk State	William "Dick" Price Stadium; Norfolk, VA	L 14–19	9,316	
November 11	at South Carolina State	Oliver C. Dawson Stadium; Orangeburg, SC	L 37–57		
November 18	at Hampton	Armstrong Stadium; Hampton, VA	L 14–31	2,052	
*Non-conference game; ^{†}Homecoming; Rankings from The Sports Network Poll released prior to the game
