= 2000 Alcorn State Braves football team =

American college football season

2000 Alcorn State Braves football
- Conference: Southwestern Athletic Conference
- East Division
- Record: 1–10 (1–6 SWAC)
- Head coach: Johnny Thomas (3rd season)
- Offensive coordinator: John McKenzie (1st season)
- Home stadium: Jack Spinks Stadium

2000 Southwestern Athletic Conference football standings
	Conf.			Overall
Team	W		L	W		L
East Division
Alabama A&M xy	5	–	2	7	–	5
Alabama State x	5	–	2	6	–	5
Jackson State	4	–	3	7	–	4
Mississippi Valley State	1	–	6	2	–	9
Alcorn State	0	–	7	0	–	11
West Division
No. 13 Grambling State xy$	6	–	1	10	–	2
Texas Southern	5	–	2	8	–	3
Arkansas–Pine Bluff	4	–	3	6	–	5
Southern	4	–	3	6	–	5
Prairie View A&M	1	–	6	1	–	10
Championship: Grambling State 14, Alabama A&M 6
$ – Conference champion; x – Division champion/co-champions; y – Championship game participant; Rankings from The Sports Network Poll

The 2000 Alcorn State Braves football team represented Alcorn State University as a member of the Southwestern Athletic Conference (SWAC) during the 2000 NCAA Division I-AA football season. Led by third-year head coach Johnny Thomas, the Braves compiled an overall record of 1–10, with a conference record of 1–6, and finished fifth in the SWAC East Division.

== Schedule ==
Date	Opponent	Site	Result	Attendance	Source
September 2	at Grambling State	Eddie G. Robinson Memorial Stadium; Grambling, LA	L 6–29	14,310	
September 9	Alabama State	Jack Spinks Stadium; Lorman, MS	W 28–35 (ASU forfeit)	3,800	
September 16	Fort Valley State*	Jack Spinks Stadium; Lorman, MS	L 17–20	10,500	
September 23	McNeese State*	Jack Spinks Stadium; Lorman, MS	L 12–41	3,500	
September 30	vs. Arkansas–Pine Bluff	Trans World Dome; St. Louis, MO (Gateway Classic)	L 10–32	34,318	
October 7	at Prairie View A&M	Edward L. Blackshear Field; Prairie View, TX	L 22–25	1,031	
October 14	Texas Southern	Jack Spinks Stadium; Lorman, MS	L 13–16	13,500	
October 21	Southern	Jack Spinks Stadium; Lorman, MS	L 14–30	20,000	
November 4	at Mississippi Valley State	Rice–Totten Stadium; Itta Bena, MS	L 3–12	5,500	
November 11	at Alabama A&M	Louis Crews Stadium; Normal, AL	L 20–27	4,061	
November 18	at Jackson State	Mississippi Veterans Memorial Stadium; Jackson, MS (Capital City Classic)	L 14–30	9,861	
*Non-conference game
