= 2000 Arkansas–Pine Bluff Golden Lions football team =

American college football season

2000 Arkansas–Pine Bluff Golden Lions football
- Conference: Southwestern Athletic Conference
- West Division
- Record: 7–4 (4–3 SWAC)
- Head coach: Lee Hardman (8th season)
- Home stadium: Golden Lion Stadium; War Memorial Stadium

2000 Southwestern Athletic Conference football standings
	Conf.			Overall
Team	W		L	W		L
East Division
Alabama A&M xy	5	–	2	7	–	5
Alabama State x	5	–	2	6	–	5
Jackson State	4	–	3	7	–	4
Mississippi Valley State	1	–	6	2	–	9
Alcorn State	0	–	7	0	–	11
West Division
No. 13 Grambling State xy$	6	–	1	10	–	2
Texas Southern	5	–	2	8	–	3
Arkansas–Pine Bluff	4	–	3	6	–	5
Southern	4	–	3	6	–	5
Prairie View A&M	1	–	6	1	–	10
Championship: Grambling State 14, Alabama A&M 6
$ – Conference champion; x – Division champion/co-champions; y – Championship game participant; Rankings from The Sports Network Poll

The 2000 Arkansas–Pine Bluff Golden Lions football team represented the University of Arkansas at Pine Bluff as a member of the Southwestern Athletic Conference (SWAC) during the 2000 NCAA Division I-AA football season. Led by eighth-year head coach Lee Hardman, the Golden Lions compiled an overall record of 7–4, with a mark of 4–3 in conference play, and finished tied for third in the SWAC West Division.

== Schedule ==
Date	Opponent	Site	Result	Attendance	Source
September 2	at Mississippi Valley State	Rice–Totten Stadium; Itta Bena, MS	W 40–7		
September 9	Southern	War Memorial Stadium; Little Rock, AR	W 30–19		
September 23	at Alabama State	Cramton Bowl; Montgomery, AL	W 34–37 (forfeit win)	9,647	
September 30	vs. Alcorn State	Trans World Dome; St. Louis, MO (Gateway Classic)	W 32–10	34,318	
October 7	at Texas Southern	Robertson Stadium; Houston, TX	L 18–21		
October 14	vs. No. 21 Grambling State	Independence Stadium; Shreveport, LA (Red River Classic)	L 17–24		
October 21	Kentucky State*	Golden Lion Stadium; Pine Bluff, AR	L 30–34		
October 28	Jackson State	Golden Lion Stadium; Pine Bluff, AR	W 48–41		
November 4	Prairie View A&M	Golden Lion Stadium; Pine Bluff, AR	W 32–13		
November 11	Lane*	Golden Lion Stadium; Pine Bluff, AR	W 44–18		
November 18	Alabama A&M	Golden Lion Stadium; Pine Bluff, AR	L 0–26		
*Non-conference game; Rankings from The Sports Network Poll released prior to the game
