= 2000 Alabama A&M Bulldogs football team =

American college football season

2000 Alabama A&M Bulldogs football

SWAC Championship Game, L 6–14 vs. Grambling State
- Conference: Southwestern Athletic Conference
- East Division
- Record: 7–5 (5–2 SWAC)
- Head coach: Ron Cooper (3rd season)
- Offensive coordinator: Fred Kaiss (1st season)
- Home stadium: Louis Crews Stadium

2000 Southwestern Athletic Conference football standings
| | Conf. | | | Overall |
| Team | W | | L | W | | L |
|---|---|---|---|---|---|---|
East Division
| Alabama A&M xy | 5 | – | 2 | 7 | – | 5 |
| Alabama State x | 5 | – | 2 | 6 | – | 5 |
| Jackson State | 4 | – | 3 | 7 | – | 4 |
| Mississippi Valley State | 1 | – | 6 | 2 | – | 9 |
| Alcorn State | 0 | – | 7 | 0 | – | 11 |
West Division
| No. 13 Grambling State xy$ | 6 | – | 1 | 10 | – | 2 |
| Texas Southern | 5 | – | 2 | 8 | – | 3 |
| Arkansas–Pine Bluff | 4 | – | 3 | 6 | – | 5 |
| Southern | 4 | – | 3 | 6 | – | 5 |
| Prairie View A&M | 1 | – | 6 | 1 | – | 10 |
Championship: Grambling State 14, Alabama A&M 6
$ – Conference champion; x – Division champion/co-champions; y – Championship game participant; Rankings from The Sports Network Poll

The 2000 Alabama A&M Bulldogs football team represented Alabama A&M University as a member of the Southwestern Athletic Conference (SWAC) during the 2000 NCAA Division I-AA football season. Led by third-year head coach Ron Cooper, the Bulldogs compiled an overall record of 7–5, with a conference record of 5–2, and finished first in the SWAC East Division.

== Schedule ==
| Date | Opponent | Site | Result | Attendance | Source |
|---|---|---|---|---|---|
| September 2 | No. 3 Troy State* | Louis Crews Stadium; Normal, AL | L 13–28 | 9,771 | |
| September 9 | Henderson State* | Louis Crews Stadium; Normal, AL | W 39–10 | 3,784 | |
| September 16 | Grambling State | Louis Crews Stadium; Normal, AL | L 14–17 | 13,050 | |
| September 23 | at Prairie View A&M | Edward L. Blackshear Field; Prairie View, TX | W 49–10 | 4,011 | |
| September 30 | Mississippi Valley State | Louis Crews Stadium; Normal, AL | W 26–12 | 13,553 | |
| October 7 | Southern | Louis Crews Stadium; Normal, AL | L 20–31 | 9,983 | |
| October 14 | at Morris Brown* | Herndon Stadium; Atlanta, GA | W 30–24 ^{OT} | 15,004 | |
| October 28 | vs. Alabama State | Legion Field; Birmingham, AL (Magic City Classic) | W 34–27 | 61,147 | |
| November 4 | at Jackson State | Mississippi Veterans Memorial Stadium; Jackson, MS | L 28–34 ^{OT} | 18,177 | |
| November 11 | Alcorn State | Louis Crews Stadium; Normal, AL | W 27–20 | 4,061 | |
| November 18 | at Arkansas–Pine Bluff | Golden Lion Stadium; Pine Bluff, AR | W 26–0 | 4,276 | |
| December 2 | vs. No. 12 Grambling State | Legion Field; Birmingham, AL (SWAC Championship Game) | L 6–14 | 34,687 | |
*Non-conference game; Rankings from The Sports Network Poll released prior to the game
