= 2000 Southwest Missouri State Bears football team =

American college football season

2000 Southwest Missouri State Bears football
- Conference: Gateway Football Conference
- Record: 5–6 (2–4 GFC)
- Head coach: Randy Ball (2nd season)
- Offensive coordinator: Courtney Messingham (1st season)
- Defensive coordinator: Deion Melvin (2nd season)
- Captains: Luis Almanzar; Jeff Hewitt; Matt White; Brent Withers
- Home stadium: Plaster Sports Complex

2000 Gateway Football Conference standings
	Conf.			Overall
Team	W		L	W		L
No. 12 Western Illinois $^	5	–	1	9	–	3
No. 11 Youngstown State ^	4	–	2	9	–	3
No. 24 Illinois State	4	–	2	7	–	4
No. 19 Northern Iowa	3	–	3	7	–	4
Southwest Missouri State	2	–	4	5	–	6
Southern Illinois	2	–	4	3	–	8
Indiana State	1	–	5	1	–	10
$ – Conference champion; ^ – NCAA Division I-AA playoff participant; Rankings from The Sports Network poll

The 2000 Southwest Missouri State Bears football team represented Southwest Missouri State University (now known as Missouri State University) as a member of the Gateway Football Conference (GFC) during the 2000 NCAA Division I-AA football season. Led by second-year head coach Randy Ball, the Bears compiled an overall record of 5–6, with a mark of 2–4 in conference play, and finished tied for fifth in the GFC.

== Schedule ==
Date	Opponent	Site	Result	Attendance	Source
September 2	at Arkansas*	War Memorial Stadium; Little Rock, AR	L 0–38	53,946	
September 9	Missouri Southern*	Plaster Sports Complex; Springfield, MO	W 48–3	15,647	
September 16	at McNeese State*	Cowboy Stadium; Lake Charles, LA	L 19–26 ^{2OT}	14,460	
September 30	No. 3 Youngstown State	Plaster Sports Complex; Springfield, MO	L 13–19	11,592	
October 7	at Indiana State	Memorial Stadium; Terre Haute, IN	W 24–7	3,845	
October 14	No. 7 Western Illinois	Plaster Sports Complex; Springfield, MO	L 10–14	8,738	
October 21	Southern Illinois	Plaster Sports Complex; Springfield, MO	W 27–9	13,785	
October 28	at Northern Iowa	UNI-Dome; Cedar Falls, IA	L 13–31	10,687	
November 4	Tennessee–Martin*	Plaster Sports Complex; Springfield, MO	W 52–6	7,297	
November 11	Southeast Missouri State*	Plaster Sports Complex; Springfield, MO	W 24–7	6,504	
November 18	at Illinois State	Hancock Stadium; Normal, IL	L 7–40	6,527	
*Non-conference game; Rankings from The Sports Network Poll released prior to the game
