= 2000 Montana State Bobcats football team =

American college football season

2000 Montana State Bobcats football
- Conference: Big Sky Conference
- Record: 0–11 (0–8 Big Sky)
- Head coach: Mike Kramer (1st season)
- Defensive coordinator: Pete Kwiatkowski (1st season)
- Home stadium: Bobcat Stadium

2000 Big Sky Conference football standings
	Conf.			Overall
Team	W		L	W		L
No. 2 Montana $^	8	–	0	13	–	2
No. 15 Portland State ^	5	–	3	8	–	4
No. 18 Weber State	5	–	3	7	–	4
Sacramento State	5	–	3	7	–	4
Eastern Washington	5	–	3	6	–	5
Idaho State	4	–	4	6	–	5
Cal State Northridge	2	–	6	4	–	7
Northern Arizona	2	–	6	3	–	8
Montana State	0	–	8	0	–	11
$ – Conference champion; ^ – NCAA Division I-AA playoff participant; Rankings from The Sports Network poll

The 2000 Montana State Bobcats football team was an American football team that represented Montana State University in the Big Sky Conference (Big Sky) during the 2000 NCAA Division I-AA football season. In their first season under head coach Mike Kramer, the Bobcats compiled a 0–11 record (0–8 against Big Sky opponents) and finished in last place in the Big Sky.

In the 100th meeting in the Montana–Montana State football rivalry, the Bobcats lost, marking their 15th consecutive loss in the series.

== Schedule ==
Date	Opponent	Site	Result	Attendance	Source
September 9	Humboldt State*	Bobcat Stadium; Bozeman, MT	L 14–23	10,237	
September 16	Weber State	Bobcat Stadium; Bozeman, MT	L 7–28	7,667	
September 23	Cal Poly*	Bobcat Stadium; Bozeman, MT	L 14–35	4,757	
September 30	at Idaho*	Martin Stadium; Pullman, WA	L 7–56	13,315	
October 7	No. 23 Eastern Washington^{†}	Bobcat Stadium; Bozeman, MT	L 14–20	9,747	
October 14	at Sacramento State	Hornet Stadium; Sacramento, CA	L 13–24	11,958	
October 21	Cal State Northridge	Bobcat Stadium; Bozeman, MT	L 12–24	4,127	
October 28	at Northern Arizona	Walkup Skydome; Flagstaff, AZ	L 9–32	5,014	
November 4	No. 12 Portland State	Bobcat Stadium; Bozeman, MT	L 24–31	5,747	
November 11	at Idaho State^{†}	Holt Arena; Pocatello, ID	L 14–58	7,262	
November 18	at No. 1 Montana	Washington–Grizzly Stadium; Missoula, MT (rivalry)	L 3–28	19,367	
*Non-conference game; ^{†}Homecoming; Rankings from The Sports Network Poll released prior to the game
