= 2000 Cal State Northridge Matadors football team =

American college football season

2000 Cal State Northridge Matadors football
- Conference: Big Sky Conference
- Record: 4–7 (2–6 Big Sky)
- Head coach: Jeff Kearin (2nd season)
- Home stadium: North Campus Stadium

2000 Big Sky Conference football standings
	Conf.			Overall
Team	W		L	W		L
No. 2 Montana $^	8	–	0	13	–	2
No. 15 Portland State ^	5	–	3	8	–	4
No. 18 Weber State	5	–	3	7	–	4
Sacramento State	5	–	3	7	–	4
Eastern Washington	5	–	3	6	–	5
Idaho State	4	–	4	6	–	5
Cal State Northridge	2	–	6	4	–	7
Northern Arizona	2	–	6	3	–	8
Montana State	0	–	8	0	–	11
$ – Conference champion; ^ – NCAA Division I-AA playoff participant; Rankings from The Sports Network poll

The 2000 Cal State Northridge Matadors football team represented California State University, Northridge as a member of the Big Sky Conference during the 2000 NCAA Division I-AA football season. Led by second-year head coach Jeff Kearin, Cal State Northridge compiled an overall record of 4–7 with a mark of 2–6 in conference play, tying for seventh place in the Big Sky. The Matadors played home games at North Campus Stadium in Northridge, California.

== Schedule ==
Date	Opponent	Site	Result	Attendance	Source
September 2	at Air Force*	Falcon Stadium; Colorado Springs, CO	L 6–55	50,166	
September 9	at Southwest Texas State*	Bobcat Stadium; San Marcos, TX	W 19–13 ^{OT}	12,528	
September 16	No. 20 Northern Arizona	North Campus Stadium; Northridge, CA	L 26–49	3,085	
September 30	Idaho State	North Campus Stadium; Northridge, CA	L 30–31 ^{OT}	2,750	
October 5	at Weber State	Wildcat Stadium; Ogden, UT	L 14–31	8,812	
October 14	No. 6 Montana	North Campus Stadium; Northridge, CA	L 30–34	3,072	
October 21	at Montana State	Bobcat Stadium; Bozeman, MT	W 24–12	4,127	
October 28	Eastern Washington	North Campus Stadium; Northridge, CA	W 31–26	2,879	
November 4	at Sacramento State	Hornet Stadium; Sacramento, CA	L 61–64	7,912	
November 11	Cal Poly*	North Campus Stadium; Northridge, CA	W 45–27	1,915	
November 18	at No. 15 Portland State	Hillsboro Stadium; Hillsboro, OR	L 22–49	2,938	
*Non-conference game; Rankings from The Sports Network Poll released prior to the game
