= Jerry Graybeal =

American football player and coach (born 1955)

Current position
- Title: Associate athletics director for development
- Team: Weber State Wildcats
- Conference: Big Sky Conference
- Record: 0–0

Biographical details
- Born: October 12, 1955 (age 71)

Playing career
- 1977–1978: Idaho State
- Position: Cornerback

Coaching career (HC unless noted)
- 1979–1982: Walla Walla (DB)
- 1982–1987: Eastern Washington (assistant)
- 1988–1997: Eastern Washington (DC)
- 1998–2004: Weber State

Administrative career (AD unless noted)
- 2005: Weber State (SADA)
- 2005: Weber State (interim AD)
- 2006–2009: Weber State
- 2009–?: Weber State (AVPASS)
- ?–present: Weber State (AADD)

Head coaching record
- Overall: 32–46

Accomplishments and honors

Awards
- Big Sky Conference Coach of the Year (2003)

Jerry Gale Graybeal (born October 12, 1955) is an American football coach and former player who is currently the associate athletics director for development of Weber State University. He played college football at Idaho State and later coached the Weber State football team from 1998 to 2004. He also served as athletic director of the school from 2005 to 2009.

== Early life and education ==
Graybeal was born on October 12, 1955. He attended Walla Walla High School and played cornerback in college for Idaho State from 1977 to 1978.

== Coaching career ==
After graduating from Idaho State, Graybeal started a coaching career in 1979 with the Walla Walla Community College Warriors football team as the defensive backs coach. After serving several seasons in that position, he was named assistant coach at Eastern Washington University. He was promoted from assistant coach to defensive coordinator in 1988, serving in that position for the next ten seasons. In December 1997, Graybeal was named head football coach at Weber State University. He led them to a winning record in his first season, but the team declined the following year and won just four out of eleven games. In 2000, Weber State rebounded, winning seven out of eleven games and being ranked number 18 nationally. Two consecutive 3–8 seasons in 2001 and 2002 put Graybeal "on the hot seat," but he helped the team compile a 8–4 record the following year, leading him to be named Big Sky Conference Coach of the Year and get a renewed contract. However, Weber State lost a team-record 10 games in the 2004 season, which led to Graybeal being "relieved of his coaching duties."

== Later career ==
In 2005, Graybeal was named "special assistant to the director of athletics," before being promoted a few months later to interim athletic director following the resignation of William J. Weidner. He returned to the position of athletic director in 2006, and served in that position before resigning in 2009. He subsequently accepted a lesser position as assistant vice president in administrative support services and later became associate athletics director for development.

== Head coaching record ==
Year	Team	Overall	Conference	Standing	Bowl/playoffs
Weber State Wildcats (Big Sky Conference) (1998–2004)
1998	Weber State	6–5	4–4	4th	
1999	Weber State	4–7	3–5	6th	
2000	Weber State	7–4	5–2	4th	
2001	Weber State	3–8	2–5	6th	
2002	Weber State	3–8	1–6	8th	
2003	Weber State	8–4	4–3	5th	
2004	Weber State	1–10	1–6	8th	
Weber State:		32–46	23–31		
Total:		32–46			
