= 2000 Bethune–Cookman Wildcats football team =

American college football season

2000 Bethune–Cookman Wildcats football
- Conference: Mid-Eastern Athletic Conference

Ranking
- Sports Network: No. 20
- Record: 9–2 (6–2 MEAC)
- Head coach: Alvin Wyatt (4th season)
- Home stadium: Municipal Stadium

2000 Mid-Eastern Athletic Conference football standings
	Conf.			Overall
Team	W		L	W		L
No. 14 Florida A&M $^	7	–	1	9	–	3
No. 20 Bethune–Cookman	6	–	2	9	–	2
No. 21 North Carolina A&T	6	–	2	8	–	3
Delaware State	5	–	3	7	–	4
Hampton	5	–	3	7	–	4
Howard	3	–	5	3	–	8
Norfolk State	2	–	6	3	–	8
South Carolina State	2	–	6	3	–	8
Morgan State	0	–	8	1	–	10
$ – Conference champion; ^ – NCAA Division I-AA playoff participant; Rankings from The Sports Network poll

The 2000 Bethune–Cookman Wildcats football team represented Bethune–Cookman College (now known as Bethune–Cookman University) as a member of the Mid-Eastern Athletic Conference (MEAC) during the 2000 NCAA Division I-AA football season. Led by fourth-year head coach Alvin Wyatt, the Wildcats compiled an overall record of 9–2, with a mark of 6–2 in conference play, and finished tied for second in the MEAC.

== Schedule ==
Date	Opponent	Rank	Site	Result	Attendance	Source
September 2	vs. Savannah State*		Alltel Stadium; Jacksonville, FL (Gateway Classic)	W 30–15		
September 9	vs. Norfolk State		Lockhart Stadium; Fort Lauderdale, FL (South Florida Football Classic)	W 24–6		
September 16	Johnson C. Smith*		Municipal Stadium; Daytona Beach, FL	W 21–6		
September 23	at Morris Brown*		Herndon Stadium; Atlanta, GA	W 14–9		
September 30	vs. Morgan State		Thomas Robinson Stadium; Nassau, Bahamas (Conch Bowl Classic)	W 42–6	4,259	
October 7	Delaware State		Municipal Stadium; Daytona Beach, FL	W 41–20		
October 14	South Carolina State		Municipal Stadium; Daytona Beach, FL	W 42–14	6,845	
October 28	at No. 23 North Carolina A&T	No. 22	Aggie Stadium; Greensboro, NC	L 19–30		
November 4	at Hampton	No. 25	Armstrong Stadium; Hampton, VA	W 34–31		
November 11	at Howard	No. 22	William H. Greene Stadium; Washington, DC	W 35–0		
November 18	vs. No. 13 Florida A&M	No. 20	Florida Citrus Bowl; Orlando, FL (Florida Classic)	L 28–31	70,719	
*Non-conference game; Rankings from The Sports Network Poll released prior to the game
