= 2000 Western Kentucky Hilltoppers football team =

American college football season

2000 Western Kentucky Hilltoppers football

OVC champion

NCAA Division I-AA Quarterfinal, L 14–17 vs. Appalachian State
- Conference: Ohio Valley Conference

Ranking
- Sports Network: No. 5
- Record: 11–2 (7–0 OVC)
- Head coach: Jack Harbaugh (12th season)
- Defensive coordinator: Don Martindale
- Home stadium: L. T. Smith Stadium

2000 Ohio Valley Conference football standings
	Conf.			Overall
Team	W		L	W		L
No. 5 Western Kentucky $^	7	–	0	11	–	2
No. 17 Eastern Illinois ^	6	–	1	8	–	4
No. 22 Tennessee Tech	5	–	2	8	–	3
Murray State	4	–	3	6	–	5
Eastern Kentucky	3	–	4	6	–	5
Tennessee State	2	–	5	3	–	8
Southeast Missouri State	1	–	6	3	–	8
Tennessee–Martin	0	–	7	2	–	9
$ – Conference champion; ^ – NCAA Division I-AA playoff participant; Rankings from The Sports Network poll

The 2000 Western Kentucky Hilltoppers football team represented Western Kentucky University in the 2000 NCAA Division I-AA football season and were led by veteran head coach Jack Harbaugh. They won their first conference championship since 1980, going undefeated in the Ohio Valley Conference (OVC) in just their second year after rejoining as a football-only member; the school was a football independent from 1982 through 1998. The Hilltoppers received the OVC's automatic berth to the NCAA Division I-AA playoff, making it to the quarterfinals. Prior to the start of the season, the OVC gave Western Kentucky an ultimatum, join the conference for all sports or leave. The administration decided to leave and joined the Gateway Football Conference. The Hilltoppers finished the season ranked No. 5 in final national poll by The Sports Network.

Western Kentucky was ranked first in pass efficiency, scoring defense, and turnover margin out of all NCAA Division I-AA teams. The team's roster included future National Football League (NFL) players Joseph Jefferson, Mel Mitchell, Sherrod Coates, and Bobby Sippio, and NFL coach Jason Michael. Sippio and Melvin Wisham were named to the AP All-American team and Harbaugh was OVC Coach of The Year. The All-Conference team included DeWayne Gallishaw, Peter Martinez, Chris Price, Sippio, Wisham, Coates, Jefferson, and Mitchell.

== Schedule ==
Date	Opponent	Rank	Site	Result	Attendance	Source
September 9	Tennessee–Martin		L. T. Smith Stadium; Bowling Green, KY	W 71–0	7,800	
September 16	at No. 24 Elon*		Rhodes Stadium; Elon, NC	W 23–0	5,081	
September 23	at Southeast Missouri State	No. 24	Houck Stadium; Cape Girardeau, MO	W 38–14	10,222	
September 30	at Murray State	No. 24	Roy Stewart Stadium; Murray, KY (Battle for the Red Belt)	W 48–38	8,266	
October 7	No. 18 Eastern Kentucky	No. 20	L. T. Smith Stadium; Bowling Green, KY (Battle of the Bluegrass)	W 6–3	10,500	
October 14	Tennessee Tech^{†}	No. 14	L. T. Smith Stadium; Bowling Green, KY	W 17–14	12,200	
October 21	at Tennessee State	No. 12	Adelphia Coliseum; Nashville, TN	W 52–14	6,932	
October 28	No. 19 Eastern Illinois	No. 9	L. T. Smith Stadium; Bowling Green, KY	W 34–12	11,300	
November 4	at South Florida*	No. 6	Raymond James Stadium; Tampa, FL	L 24–30	31,104	
November 11	Indiana State*	No. 10	L. T. Smith Stadium; Bowling Green, KY	W 28–3	5,800	
November 18	Southern Illinois*	No. 7	L. T. Smith Stadium; Bowling Green, KY	W 22–0	5,200	
November 25	No. 13 Florida A&M*	No. 7	L. T. Smith Stadium; Bowling Green, KY (NCAA Division I-AA First Round)	W 27–0	3,200	
December 6	No. 14 Appalachian State*	No. 7	L. T. Smith Stadium; Bowling Green, KY (NCAA Division I-AA Quarterfinal)	L 14–17	5,100	
*Non-conference game; ^{†}Homecoming; Rankings from The Sports Network Poll released prior to the game
