= 2000 Youngstown State Penguins football team =

American college football season

2000 Youngstown State Penguins football

NCAA Division I-AA First Round, L 24–49 vs. Appalachian State
- Conference: Gateway Football Conference

Ranking
- Sports Network: No. 11
- Record: 9–3 (4–2 Gateway)
- Head coach: Jim Tressel (15th season)
- Home stadium: Stambaugh Stadium

2000 Gateway Football Conference standings
	Conf.			Overall
Team	W		L	W		L
No. 12 Western Illinois $^	5	–	1	9	–	3
No. 11 Youngstown State ^	4	–	2	9	–	3
No. 24 Illinois State	4	–	2	7	–	4
No. 19 Northern Iowa	3	–	3	7	–	4
Southwest Missouri State	2	–	4	5	–	6
Southern Illinois	2	–	4	3	–	8
Indiana State	1	–	5	1	–	10
$ – Conference champion; ^ – NCAA Division I-AA playoff participant; Rankings from The Sports Network poll

The 2000 Youngstown State Penguins football team represented Youngstown State University in the 2000 NCAA Division I-AA football season. The team was led by Jim Tressel in his fifteenth and final season as head coach and played its home games at Stambaugh Stadium in Youngstown, Ohio. The Penguins finished the season with a 9–3 record overall and a 4–2 record in Gateway Football Conference matches. They were selected as an at-large team for the Division I-AA playoffs, where they lost to Richmond in the first round. The team was ranked No. 11 in The Sports Network's postseason Division I-AA poll.

== Schedule ==
Date	Opponent	Rank	Site	Result	Attendance	Source
August 31	Slippery Rock*	No. 7	Stambaugh Stadium; Youngstown, OH	W 24–10	17,759	
September 9	Edinboro*	No. 7	Stambaugh Stadium; Youngstown, OH	W 33–0	15,584	
September 16	at Kent State*	No. 6	Dix Stadium; Kent, OH	W 26–20	13,642	
September 30	at Southwest Missouri State	No. 3	Plaster Sports Complex; Springfield, MO	W 19–13	11,592	
October 7	at Illinois State	No. 2	Hancock Stadium; Normal, IL	W 14–12	11,938	
October 14	No. 23 Northern Iowa	No. 3	Stambaugh Stadium; Youngstown, OH	W 28–24	21,119	
October 21	at No. 6 Western Illinois	No. 3	Hanson Field; Macomb, IL	L 10–24	13,418	
October 28	Indiana State^{†}	No. 7	Stambaugh Stadium; Youngstown, OH	W 42–7	20,813	
November 4	Hofstra*	No. 5	Stambaugh Stadium; Youngstown, OH	W 42–35 ^{2OT}	16,832	
November 11	Southern Illinois	No. 2	Stambaugh Stadium; Youngstown, OH	L 20–21	16,549	
November 18	at Cal Poly*	No. 9	Mustang Stadium; San Luis Obispo, CA	W 35–13	4,178	
November 25	at No. 10 Richmond*	No. 9	University of Richmond Stadium; Richmond, VA (NCAA Division I-AA First Round)	L 3–10	5,484	
*Non-conference game; ^{†}Homecoming; Rankings from The Sports Network Poll released prior to the game
