= 2000 Western Illinois Leathernecks football team =

American college football season

2000 Western Illinois Leathernecks football

Gateway champion

NCAA Division I-AA First Round, L 7–37 vs. Lehigh
- Conference: Gateway Football Conference

Ranking
- Sports Network: No. 12
- Record: 9–3 (5–1 Gateway)
- Head coach: Don Patterson (2nd season)
- Offensive coordinator: Mark Hendrickson (2nd season)
- Home stadium: Hanson Field

2000 Gateway Football Conference standings
	Conf.			Overall
Team	W		L	W		L
No. 12 Western Illinois $^	5	–	1	9	–	3
No. 11 Youngstown State ^	4	–	2	9	–	3
No. 24 Illinois State	4	–	2	7	–	4
No. 19 Northern Iowa	3	–	3	7	–	4
Southwest Missouri State	2	–	4	5	–	6
Southern Illinois	2	–	4	3	–	8
Indiana State	1	–	5	1	–	10
$ – Conference champion; ^ – NCAA Division I-AA playoff participant; Rankings from The Sports Network poll

The 2000 Western Illinois Leathernecks football team represented Western Illinois University as a member of the Gateway Football Conference during the 2000 NCAA Division I-AA football season. They were led by second-year head coach Don Patterson and played their home games at Hanson Field. The Leathernecks finished the season with a 9–3 record overall and a 5–1 record in conference play, making them conference champions. The team received an automatic bid to the NCAA Division I-AA Football Championship playoffs, where they lost to Lehigh in the first round. The team was ranked No. 12 in The Sports Network's postseason ranking of Division I-AA.

== Schedule ==
Date	Time	Opponent	Rank	Site	TV	Result	Attendance	Source
September 2	6:30 p.m.	at Missouri*	No. 23	Faurot Field; Columbia, MO		L 20–50	53,224	
September 9	12:00 p.m.	at Ball State*	No. 25	Ball State Stadium; Muncie, IN		W 24–14	12,779	
September 16	1:05 p.m.	No. 23 Sam Houston State*	No. 19	Hanson Field; Macomb, IL		W 31–0	5,934	
September 23	1:05 p.m.	Nicholls State*	No. 15	Hanson Field; Macomb, IL		W 44–3	4,787	
September 30	1:05 p.m.	Indiana State^{†}	No. 12	Hanson Field; Macomb, IL		W 49–7	12,348	
October 7	1:30 p.m.	at Southern Illinois	No. 11	McAndrew Stadium; Carbondale, IL		W 42–17	10,000	
October 14	1:30 p.m.	at Southwest Missouri State	No. 7	Robert W. Plaster Stadium; Springfield, MO	Gateway TV	W 14–10	8,738	
October 21	1:05 p.m.	No. 3 Youngstown State	No. 6	Hanson Field; Macomb, IL		W 24–10	13,418	
October 28	1:05 p.m.	Morgan State*	No. 3	Hanson Field; Macomb, IL		W 73–17	4,839	
November 4	1:05 p.m.	Illinois State	No. 4	Hanson Field; Macomb, IL		L 18–25	10,147	
November 18	7:05 p.m.	at No. 18 Northern Iowa	No. 6	UNI-Dome; Cedar Falls, IA		W 44–41	14,128	
November 25		No. 8 Lehigh*	No. 6	Hanson Field; Macomb, IL (NCAA Division I-AA First Round)		L 7–37	3,204	
*Non-conference game; ^{†}Homecoming; Rankings from The Sports Network Poll released prior to the game; All times are in Central time
