= 2000 Jackson State Tigers football team =

American college football season

2000 Jackson State Tigers football
- Conference: Southwestern Athletic Conference
- East Division
- Record: 8–3 (5–2 SWAC)
- Head coach: Judge Hughes (2nd season)
- Home stadium: Mississippi Veterans Memorial Stadium

2000 Southwestern Athletic Conference football standings
	Conf.			Overall
Team	W		L	W		L
East Division
Alabama A&M xy	5	–	2	7	–	5
Alabama State x	5	–	2	6	–	5
Jackson State	4	–	3	7	–	4
Mississippi Valley State	1	–	6	2	–	9
Alcorn State	0	–	7	0	–	11
West Division
No. 13 Grambling State xy$	6	–	1	10	–	2
Texas Southern	5	–	2	8	–	3
Arkansas–Pine Bluff	4	–	3	6	–	5
Southern	4	–	3	6	–	5
Prairie View A&M	1	–	6	1	–	10
Championship: Grambling State 14, Alabama A&M 6
$ – Conference champion; x – Division champion/co-champions; y – Championship game participant; Rankings from The Sports Network Poll

The 2000 Jackson State Tigers football team represented Jackson State University as a member of the Southwestern Athletic Conference (SWAC) during the 2000 NCAA Division I-AA football season. Led by second-year head coach Judge Hughes, the Tigers compiled an overall record of 8–3 and a mark of 5–2 in conference play, and finished second in the SWAC East Division.

== Schedule ==
Date	Opponent	Site	Result	Attendance	Source
September 2	vs. Howard*	Soldier Field; Chicago, IL (Chicago Football Classic)	W 34–16	43,364	
September 9	Texas Southern	Mississippi Veterans Memorial Stadium; Jackson, MS	L 15–19	9,766	
September 16	vs. Tennessee State*	Liberty Bowl Memorial Stadium; Memphis, TN (Southern Heritage Classic)	W 42–39 ^{OT}	52,113	
September 23	vs. Southern	Louisiana Superdome; New Orleans, LA (rivalry)	W 13–10	49,146	
October 7	vs. Alabama State	Ladd–Peebles Stadium; Mobile, AL (Gulf Coast Classic)	W 24–35 (forfeit win)	13,000	
October 14	Mississippi Valley State	Mississippi Veterans Memorial Stadium; Jackson, MS	W 64–20	15,526	
October 21	at No. 20 Grambling State	Eddie G. Robinson Memorial Stadium; Grambling, LA	L 30–33	16,424	
October 28	at Arkansas–Pine Bluff	Golden Lion Stadium; Pine Bluff, AR	L 41–48	11,218	
November 4	Alabama A&M^{†}	Mississippi Veterans Memorial Stadium; Jackson, MS	W 34–28 ^{OT}	18,177	
November 11	New Haven*	Mississippi Veterans Memorial Stadium; Jackson, MS	W 38–37	3,291	
November 18	Alcorn State	Mississippi Veterans Memorial Stadium; Jackson, MS (Capital City Classic)	W 30–14	9,861	
*Non-conference game; ^{†}Homecoming; Rankings from The Sports Network Poll released prior to the game
