= 2000 Idaho State Bengals football team =

American college football season

2000 Idaho State Bengals football
- Conference: Big Sky Conference
- Record: 6–5 (4–4 Big Sky)
- Head coach: Larry Lewis (2nd season)
- Offensive scheme: Pro spread
- Defensive coordinator: Bruce Barnum (1st season)
- Base defense: 4–3
- Home stadium: Holt Arena

2000 Big Sky Conference football standings
| | Conf. | | | Overall |
| Team | W | | L | W | | L |
|---|---|---|---|---|---|---|
| No. 2 Montana $^ | 8 | – | 0 | 13 | – | 2 |
| No. 15 Portland State ^ | 5 | – | 3 | 8 | – | 4 |
| No. 18 Weber State | 5 | – | 3 | 7 | – | 4 |
| Sacramento State | 5 | – | 3 | 7 | – | 4 |
| Eastern Washington | 5 | – | 3 | 6 | – | 5 |
| Idaho State | 4 | – | 4 | 6 | – | 5 |
| Cal State Northridge | 2 | – | 6 | 4 | – | 7 |
| Northern Arizona | 2 | – | 6 | 3 | – | 8 |
| Montana State | 0 | – | 8 | 0 | – | 11 |
$ – Conference champion; ^ – NCAA Division I-AA playoff participant; Rankings from The Sports Network poll

The 2000 Idaho State Bengals football team represented Idaho State University as a member of the Big Sky Conference during the 2000 NCAA Division I-AA football season. Led by second-year head coach Larry Lewis, the Bengals compiled an overall record of 6–5, with a mark of 4–4 in conference play, and finished sixth in the Big Sky. The team played home games at Holt Arena in Pocatello, Idaho.

== Schedule ==
| Date | Opponent | Rank | Site | Result | Attendance | Source |
|---|---|---|---|---|---|---|
| September 9 | Montana Tech* | | Holt Arena; Pocatello, ID | W 58–10 | | |
| September 16 | at Eastern Washington | | Woodward Field; Cheney, WA | L 7–38 | 5,123 | |
| September 23 | Sacramento State | | Holt Arena; Pocatello, ID | W 41–39 | 5,638 | |
| September 30 | at Cal State Northridge | | North Campus Stadium; Northridge, CA | W 31–30 ^{OT} | 2,750 | |
| October 7 | No. 24 Northern Arizona | | Holt Arena; Pocatello, ID | W 28–21 | | |
| October 14 | at No. 2 Portland State | No. 25 | Hillsboro Stadium; Hillsboro, OR | L 21–59 | 7,041 | |
| October 21 | Southern Utah*^{†} | | Holt Arena; Pocatello, ID | L 24–62 | 9,460 | |
| October 28 | No. 24 Weber State | | Holt Arena; Pocatello, ID | L 13–16 | | |
| November 4 | at No. 3 Montana | | Washington–Grizzly Stadium; Missoula, MT | L 21–38 | 18,943 | |
| November 11 | Montana State | | Holt Arena; Pocatello, ID | W 58–14 | | |
| November 18 | at Utah State* | | Romney Stadium; Logan, UT | W 27–24 | 13,877 | |
*Non-conference game; ^{†}Homecoming; Rankings from The Sports Network Poll released prior to the game
