= 2000 Hampton Pirates football team =

American college football season

2000 Hampton Pirates football
- Conference: Mid-Eastern Athletic Conference
- Record: 7–4 (5–3 MEAC)
- Head coach: Joe Taylor (9th season)
- Home stadium: Armstrong Stadium

2000 Mid-Eastern Athletic Conference football standings
	Conf.			Overall
Team	W		L	W		L
No. 14 Florida A&M $^	7	–	1	9	–	3
No. 20 Bethune–Cookman	6	–	2	9	–	2
No. 21 North Carolina A&T	6	–	2	8	–	3
Delaware State	5	–	3	7	–	4
Hampton	5	–	3	7	–	4
Howard	3	–	5	3	–	8
Norfolk State	2	–	6	3	–	8
South Carolina State	2	–	6	3	–	8
Morgan State	0	–	8	1	–	10
$ – Conference champion; ^ – NCAA Division I-AA playoff participant; Rankings from The Sports Network poll

The 2000 Hampton Pirates football team represented Hampton University as a member of the Mid-Eastern Athletic Conference (MEAC) during the 2000 NCAA Division I-AA football season. Led by ninth-year head coach Joe Taylor, the Pirates compiled an overall record of 7–4, with a mark of 5–3 in conference play, and finished tied for fourth in the MEAC.

== Schedule ==
Date	Opponent	Site	Result	Attendance	Source
September 2	New Hampshire*	Armstrong Stadium; Hampton, VA	L 17–31		
September 9	vs. Howard	Giants Stadium; East Rutherford, NJ (New York Urban League Football Classic, rivalry)	W 26–24	41,682	
September 16	Winston-Salem State*	Armstrong Stadium; Hampton, VA	W 40–6	9,022	
September 23	Southern Utah*	Armstrong Stadium; Hampton, VA	W 42–34 ^{OT}		
September 30	at Delaware State	Alumni Stadium; Dover, DE	W 54–28		
October 14	Norfolk State	Armstrong Stadium; Hampton, VA (rivalry)	W 47–19	14,141	
October 21	at South Carolina State	Oliver C. Dawson Stadium; Orangeburg, SC	W 40–37		
October 28	at No. 20 Florida A&M	Bragg Memorial Stadium; Tallahassee, FL	L 24–53	28,652	
November 4	No. 25 Bethune–Cookman	Armstrong Stadium; Hampton, VA	L 31–34		
November 11	No. 25 North Carolina A&T	Armstrong Stadium; Hampton, VA	L 28–31	10,235	
November 18	Morgan State	Armstrong Stadium; Hampton, VA	W 31–14	2,052	
*Non-conference game; Rankings from The Sports Network Poll released prior to the game
