= 2000 Eastern Washington Eagles football team =

American college football season

2000 Eastern Washington Eagles football
- Conference: Big Sky Conference
- Record: 6–5 (5–3 Big Sky)
- Head coach: Paul Wulff (1st season)
- Offensive coordinator: Dave Telford (1st season)
- Defensive coordinator: Steve Kizer (1st season)
- Home stadium: Woodward Field; Joe Albi Stadium

2000 Big Sky Conference football standings
	Conf.			Overall
Team	W		L	W		L
No. 2 Montana $^	8	–	0	13	–	2
No. 15 Portland State ^	5	–	3	8	–	4
No. 18 Weber State	5	–	3	7	–	4
Sacramento State	5	–	3	7	–	4
Eastern Washington	5	–	3	6	–	5
Idaho State	4	–	4	6	–	5
Cal State Northridge	2	–	6	4	–	7
Northern Arizona	2	–	6	3	–	8
Montana State	0	–	8	0	–	11
$ – Conference champion; ^ – NCAA Division I-AA playoff participant; Rankings from The Sports Network poll

The 2000 Eastern Washington Eagles football team represented Eastern Washington University as a member of the Big Sky Conference during the 2000 NCAA Division I-AA football season. Led by first-year head coach Paul Wulff, the Eagles compiled an overall record of 6–5, with a mark of 5–3 in conference play, and finished tied for second in the Big Sky. The team played home games at Woodward Field in Cheney and Joe Albi Stadium in Spokane, Washington.

== Schedule ==
Date	Opponent	Rank	Site	Result	Attendance	Source
September 2	at Oregon State*		Reser Stadium; Corvallis, OR	L 19–21	30,782	
September 9	Western Oregon*		Woodward Field; Cheney, WA	W 28–6	4,153	
September 16	Idaho State		Woodward Field; Cheney, WA	W 38–7	5,123	
September 23	at Weber State	No. 22	Stewart Stadium; Ogden, UT	W 27–24 ^{2OT}	8,753	
September 30	No. 9 Montana	No. 18	Joe Albi Stadium; Spokane, WA (EWU–UM Governors Cup)	L 31–41	15,678	
October 7	at Montana State	No. 23	Bobcat Stadium; Bozeman, MT	W 20–14	9,747	
October 14	at Boise State*	No. 20	Bronco Stadium; Boise, ID	L 23–41	25,493	
October 21	Sacramento State	No. 25	Woodward Field; Cheney, WA	L 22–25	6,257	
October 28	at Cal State Northridge		North Campus Stadium; Northridge, CA	L 26–31	2,879	
November 4	Northern Arizona		Woodward Field; Cheney, WA	W 27–9		
November 11	at No. 9 Portland State		Hillsboro Stadium; Hillsboro, OR	W 27–24	6,119	
*Non-conference game; Rankings from The Sports Network Poll released prior to the game
