= 2000 NCAA Division I-AA Football Championship Game =

American college football game

2000 NCAA Division I-AA Football Championship
- I-AA National Championship Game
Georgia Southern Eagles	Montana Grizzlies
(12–2)	(13–1)
SoCon	Big Sky
27	25
Head coach: Paul Johnson	Head coach: Joe Glenn
TSN / Seed; 5 / 3	TSN / Seed; 1 / 1
	1	2	3	4	Total
Georgia Southern	13	7	0	7	27
Montana	3	0	6	16	25
- Date: December 16, 2000
- Season: 2000
- Stadium: Finley Stadium
- Location: Chattanooga, Tennessee
- Referee: F. Williams
- Attendance: 17,156

United States TV coverage
- Network: ESPN
- Announcers: Rich Waltz (play-by-play), Rod Gilmore (color), Dave Ryan (sideline)

The 2000 NCAA Division I-AA Football Championship Game was a postseason college football game between the Georgia Southern Eagles and the Montana Grizzlies. The game was played on December 16, 2000, at Finley Stadium, home field of the University of Tennessee at Chattanooga. The culminating game of the 2000 NCAA Division I-AA football season, it was won by Georgia Southern, 27–25.

== Teams ==
The participants of the Championship Game were the finalists of the 2000 I-AA Playoffs, which began with a 16-team bracket.

=== Montana Grizzlies ===
Montana finished their regular season with a 10–1 record (8–0 in conference); their only loss had been to Hofstra, 10–9, in the season opener. Seeded first in the playoffs, the Grizzlies defeated 16-seed Eastern Illinois, eight-seed Richmond, and 13-seed Appalachian State to reach the final. This was the third appearance for Montana in a Division I-AA championship game, having won in 1995 and having lost in 1996.

=== Georgia Southern Eagles ===
Georgia Southern finished their regular season with a 9–2 record (7–1 in conference); one of their losses had been to Georgia of Division I-A. The Eagles, seeded third, defeated 14-seed McNeese State, 11-seed Hofstra, and second-seed Delaware to reach the final. This was the eighth appearance for Georgia Southern in a Division I-AA championship game, having five prior wins (1985, 1986, 1989, 1990, 1999) and two prior losses (1988, 1998).

== Game summary ==
=== Scoring summary ===
Scoring summary

Quarter	Time	Drive			Team	Scoring information	Score	
Quarter	Time	Plays	Yards	TOP	Team	Scoring information	GSU	MONT
1	13:19	4	80	1:41	GSU	GSU offense fumbled, recovered in the end zone by James McCoy, Scott Shelton kick good	7	0
1	2:57	5	60	2:22	GSU	Chris Johnson 49-yard touchdown reception from J. R. Revere, 2-point run by Shelton failed (after bobbled snap on kick attempt)	13	0
1	1:36	5	23	1:36	MONT	38-yard field goal by Chris Snyder	13	3
2	0:33	8	69	3:01	GSU	Adrian Peterson 1-yard touchdown run, Shelton kick good	20	3
3	3:41	11	79	3:38	MONT	Etu Molden 17-yard touchdown reception from John Edwards, Snyder kick no good	20	9
4	14:36	4	73	1:30	MONT	Vince Huntsberger 65-yard touchdown run, Snyder kick no good (wide left)	20	15
4	11:53	5	18	2:00	MONT	Yo Humphrey 2-yard touchdown run, 2-point pass good (Humphrey from Edwards)	20	23
4	11:29	1	57	0:13	GSU	Peterson 57-yard touchdown run, Shelton kick good	27	23
4	0:15				MONT	GSU punter Shelton stepped out of end zone (safety)	27	25
"TOP" = time of possession. For other American football terms, see Glossary of American football.							27	25

=== Game statistics ===
	1	2	3	4	Total
No. 3 Eagles	13	7	0	7	27
No. 1 Grizzlies	3	0	6	16	25

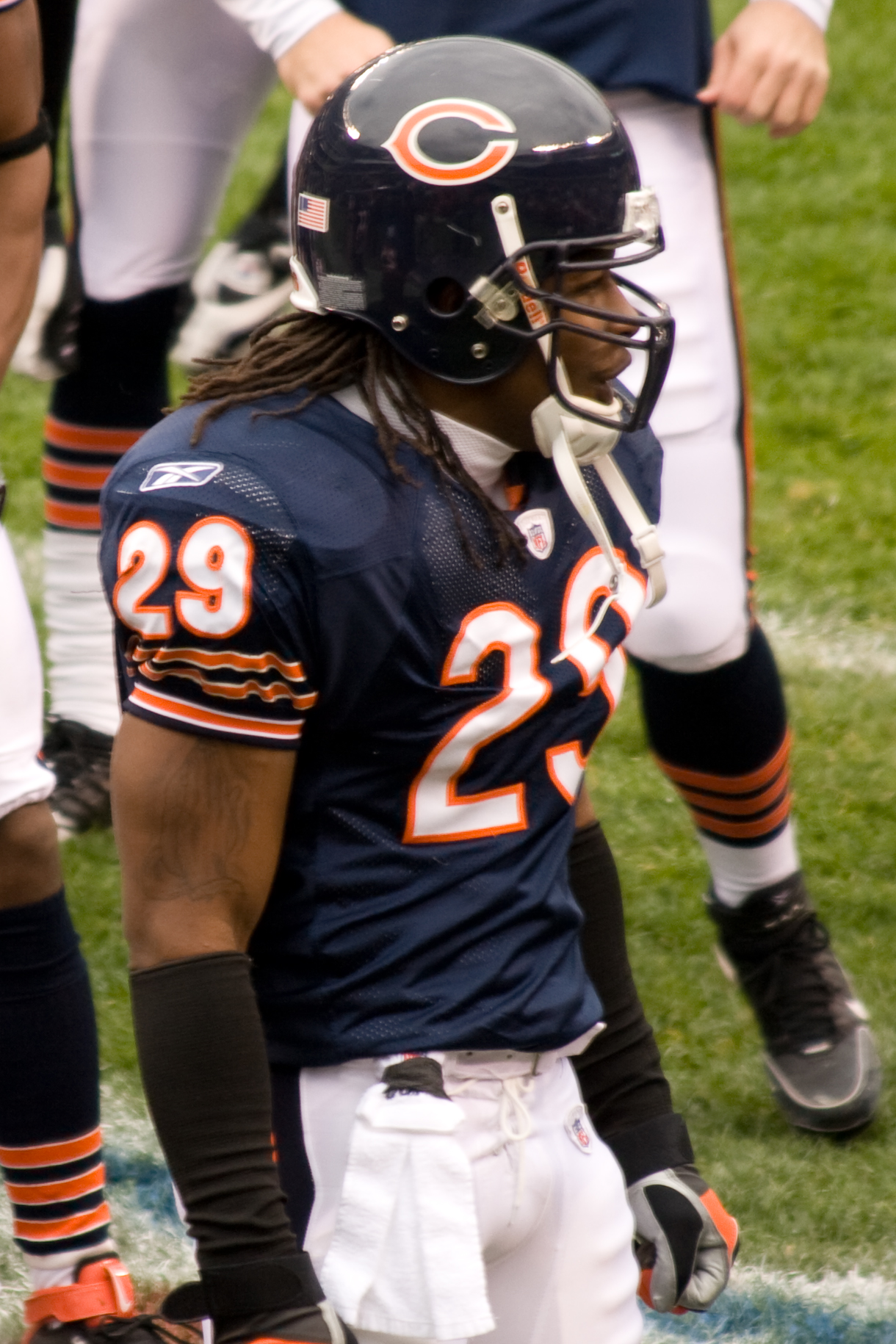
Georgia Southern running back Adrian Peterson

Statistics	GSU	MONT
First downs	14	28
Plays–yards	59–390	88–487
Rushes–yards	51–277	36–211
Passing yards	113	276
Passing: comp–att–int	5–8–0	29–52–2
Time of possession	27:39	32:21

Team	Category	Player	Statistics
Georgia Southern	Passing	J. R. Revere	5–8, 113 yds, 1 TD
Georgia Southern	Rushing	Adrian Peterson	23 car, 148 yds, 2 TD
Georgia Southern	Receiving	Chris Johnson	4 rec, 110 yds, 1 TD
Montana	Passing	John Edwards	24–42, 211 yds, 1 INT, 1 TD
Montana	Rushing	Yo Humphrey	26 car, 119 yds, 1 TD
Montana	Receiving	Jimmy Farris	7 rec, 82 yds
