= 2000 Tennessee State Tigers football team =

American college football season

2000 Tennessee State Tigers football
- Conference: Ohio Valley Conference
- Record: 3–8 (2–5 OVC)
- Head coach: James Reese (1st season)
- Offensive coordinator: Jon Carr (1st as OC, 4th overall season)
- Defensive coordinator: Andre Creamer (2nd season)
- Home stadium: Adelphia Coliseum

2000 Ohio Valley Conference football standings
	Conf.			Overall
Team	W		L	W		L
No. 5 Western Kentucky $^	7	–	0	11	–	2
No. 17 Eastern Illinois ^	6	–	1	8	–	4
No. 22 Tennessee Tech	5	–	2	8	–	3
Murray State	4	–	3	6	–	5
Eastern Kentucky	3	–	4	6	–	5
Tennessee State	2	–	5	3	–	8
Southeast Missouri State	1	–	6	3	–	8
Tennessee–Martin	0	–	7	2	–	9
$ – Conference champion; ^ – NCAA Division I-AA playoff participant; Rankings from The Sports Network poll

The 2000 Tennessee State Tigers football team represented Tennessee State University as a member of the Ohio Valley Conference (OVC) during the 2000 NCAA Division I-AA football season. Led by first-year head coach James Reese, the Tigers compiled an overall record of 3–8, with a conference record of 2–6, and finished sixth in the OVC.

== Schedule ==
Date	Opponent	Rank	Site	Result	Attendance	Source
September 2	Alabama State*	No. 19	Adelphia Coliseum; Nashville, TN	W 39–13	20,463	
September 9	vs. No. 17 North Carolina A&T*	No. 15	Cinergy Field; Cincinnati, OH (Riverfront Classic)	L 14–16	30,300	
September 16	vs. Jackson State*	No. 22	Liberty Bowl Memorial Stadium; Memphis, TN (Southern Heritage Classic)	L 39–42 ^{OT}	52,113	
September 18	vs. No. 4 Florida A&M*		Georgia Dome; Atlanta, GA (Atlanta Football Classic)	L 6–31	62,455	
October 7	at Eastern Illinois		O'Brien Stadium; Charleston, IL	L 19–33		
October 14	Tennessee–Martin		Adelphia Coliseum; Nashville, TN	W 33–6		
October 21	No. 12 Western Kentucky		Adelphia Coliseum; Nashville, TN	L 14–52	6,932	
October 26	at Eastern Kentucky		Roy Kidd Stadium; Richmond, KY	L 0–28	7,345	
November 2	at Tennessee Tech		Tucker Stadium; Cookeville, TN	L 23–56		
November 11	at Murray State		Roy Stewart Stadium; Murray, KY	L 40–62		
November 18	Southeast Missouri State		Adelphia Coliseum; Nashville, TN	W 51–33	1,845	
*Non-conference game; Rankings from The Sports Network Poll released prior to the game
