= 2000 Portland State Vikings football team =

American college football season

2000 Portland State Vikings football

NCAA Division I-AA First Round, L 14–49 at Delaware
- Conference: Big Sky Conference

Ranking
- Sports Network: No. 15
- Record: 8–4 (5–3 Big Sky)
- Head coach: Tim Walsh (8th season)
- Home stadium: Hillsboro Stadium

2000 Big Sky Conference football standings
	Conf.			Overall
Team	W		L	W		L
No. 2 Montana $^	8	–	0	13	–	2
No. 15 Portland State ^	5	–	3	8	–	4
No. 18 Weber State	5	–	3	7	–	4
Sacramento State	5	–	3	7	–	4
Eastern Washington	5	–	3	6	–	5
Idaho State	4	–	4	6	–	5
Cal State Northridge	2	–	6	4	–	7
Northern Arizona	2	–	6	3	–	8
Montana State	0	–	8	0	–	11
$ – Conference champion; ^ – NCAA Division I-AA playoff participant; Rankings from The Sports Network poll

The 2000 Portland State Vikings football team was an American football team that represented Portland State University during the 2000 NCAA Division I-AA football season as a member of the Big Sky Conference. In their eighth year under head coach Tim Walsh, the team compiled an 8–4 record, with a mark of 5–3 in conference play, and finished tied for second in the Big Sky. The Vikings advanced to the NCAA Division I-AA playoffs and were defeated at Delaware in the first round.

For the 2000 season, Portland State played all of their home games at Hillsboro Stadium in neighboring Hillsboro, Oregon. The games were played there instead of Civic Stadium as their Portland home was undergoing major renovations to accommodate the Triple-A Portland Beavers baseball team for their 2001 season.

== Schedule ==
Date	Opponent	Rank	Site	Result	Attendance	Source
September 2	Western Washington*	No. 12	Hillsboro Stadium; Hillsboro, OR	W 37–20	5,703	
September 9	at Hawaii*	No. 12	Aloha Stadium; Halawa, HI	W 45–20	50,000	
September 16	at Sacramento State	No. 12	Hornet Stadium; Sacramento, CA	W 35–23	11,853	
September 30	at No. 17 Northern Arizona	No. 5	Walkup Skydome; Flagstaff, AZ	W 42–10	6,000	
October 7	No. 10 Hofstra*	No. 4	Hillsboro Stadium; Hillsboro, OR	W 40–35	8,824	
October 14	No. 25 Idaho State	No. 2	Hillsboro Stadium; Hillsboro, OR	W 59–21	7,041	
October 21	at Weber State	No. 2	Stewart Stadium; Ogden, UT	L 9–41	4,879	
October 28	No. 4 Montana	No. 8	Hillsboro Stadium; Hillsboro, OR	L 21–33	9,681	
November 4	at Montana State	No. 12	Bobcat Stadium; Bozeman, MT	W 31–24	5,747	
November 11	Eastern Washington	No. 9	Hillsboro Stadium; Hillsboro, OR	L 24–27	6,119	
November 18	Cal State Northridge	No. 15	Hillsboro Stadium; Hillsboro, OR	W 49–22	2,938	
November 25	at No. 2 Delaware*	No. 15	Delaware Stadium; Newark, DE (NCAA Division I-AA First Round)	L 14–49	12,945	
*Non-conference game; Rankings from The Sports Network Poll released prior to the game
