= 2000 Grambling State Tigers football team =

American college football season

2000 Grambling State Tigers football

Black college football national champion SWAC champion SWAC West Division champion

SWAC Championship Game, W 14–6 vs. Alabama A&M
- Conference: Southwestern Athletic Conference
- West Division

Ranking
- Sports Network: No. 13
- Record: 10–2 (6–1 SWAC)
- Head coach: Doug Williams (3rd season)
- Offensive coordinator: Melvin Spears (3rd season)
- Home stadium: Eddie G. Robinson Memorial Stadium

2000 Southwestern Athletic Conference football standings
	Conf.			Overall
Team	W		L	W		L
East Division
Alabama A&M xy	5	–	2	7	–	5
Alabama State x	5	–	2	6	–	5
Jackson State	4	–	3	7	–	4
Mississippi Valley State	1	–	6	2	–	9
Alcorn State	0	–	7	0	–	11
West Division
No. 13 Grambling State xy$	6	–	1	10	–	2
Texas Southern	5	–	2	8	–	3
Arkansas–Pine Bluff	4	–	3	6	–	5
Southern	4	–	3	6	–	5
Prairie View A&M	1	–	6	1	–	10
Championship: Grambling State 14, Alabama A&M 6
$ – Conference champion; x – Division champion/co-champions; y – Championship game participant; Rankings from The Sports Network Poll

The 2000 Grambling State Tigers football team represented Grambling State University as a member of the West Division of the Southwestern Athletic Conference (SWAC) during the 2000 NCAA Division I-AA football season. Led by third-year head coach Doug Williams, the Tigers compiled an overall record of 10–2 with a mark of 6–1 in conference play, winning the SWAC West Division title. Grambling State beat Alabama A&M in the SWAC Championship Game to the conference title. The team was also recognized as a black college football national champion. The Tigers offense scored 300 points while the defense allowed 207 points on the season. Grambling State played home games at Eddie G. Robinson Memorial Stadium in Grambling, Louisiana.

== Schedule ==
Date	Opponent	Rank	Site	Result	Attendance	Source
September 2	Alcorn State		Eddie G. Robinson Memorial Stadium; Grambling, LA	W 29–6	14,310	
September 9	at Louisville*		Papa John's Cardinal Stadium; Louisville, KY	L 0–52	41,227	
September 16	at Alabama A&M		Louis Crews Stadium; Normal, AL	W 17–14	13,050	
September 23	at Mississippi Valley State		Rice–Totten Field; Itta Bena, MS	W 49–13	5,672	
September 30	vs. Prairie View A&M		Cotton Bowl; Dallas, TX (rivalry)	W 47–7	65,125	
October 7	vs. No. 3 Florida A&M*		RCA Dome; Indianapolis, IN (Circle City Classic)	W 12–10	57,808	
October 14	vs. Arkansas–Pine Bluff	No. 21	Independence Stadium; Shreveport, LA (Red River Classic)	W 24–17	>30,000	
October 21	Jackson State	No. 20	Eddie G. Robinson Memorial Stadium; Grambling, LA	W 33–30	16,424	
October 28	vs. No. 25 Texas Southern	No. 17	Alamodome; San Antonio, TX (Alamo City Classic)	W 26–17		
November 4	Alabama State	No. 14	Eddie G. Robinson Memorial Stadium; Grambling, LA	W 20–2	12,954	
November 25	vs. Southern	No. 12	Louisiana Superdome; New Orleans, LA (Bayou Classic)	L 29–33	72,000	
December 2	vs. Alabama A&M*	No. 12	Legion Field; Birmingham, AL (SWAC Championship Game)	W 14–6	34,687	
*Non-conference game; Rankings from The Sports Network Poll released prior to the game

== Team players drafted into the NFL ==
Player	Position	Round	Pick	NFL team
Scotty Anderson	Wide receiver	5	148	Detroit Lions
