= 2000 Northern Arizona Lumberjacks football team =

American college football season

2000 Northern Arizona Lumberjacks football
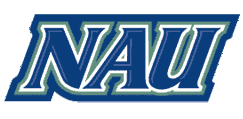
- Conference: Big Sky Conference
- Record: 3–8 (2–6 Big Sky)
- Head coach: Jerome Souers (3rd season)
- Offensive coordinator: Brent Pease (2nd season)
- Home stadium: Walkup Skydome

2000 Big Sky Conference football standings
	Conf.			Overall
Team	W		L	W		L
No. 2 Montana $^	8	–	0	13	–	2
No. 15 Portland State ^	5	–	3	8	–	4
No. 18 Weber State	5	–	3	7	–	4
Sacramento State	5	–	3	7	–	4
Eastern Washington	5	–	3	6	–	5
Idaho State	4	–	4	6	–	5
Cal State Northridge	2	–	6	4	–	7
Northern Arizona	2	–	6	3	–	8
Montana State	0	–	8	0	–	11
$ – Conference champion; ^ – NCAA Division I-AA playoff participant; Rankings from The Sports Network poll

The 2000 Northern Arizona Lumberjacks football team was an American football team that represented Northern Arizona University (NAU) as a member of the Big Sky Conference (Big Sky) during the 2000 NCAA Division I-AA football season. In their third year under head coach Jerome Souers, the Lumberjacks compiled a 3–8 record (2–6 against conference opponents), were outscored by a total of 275 to 245, and tied for seventh place in the Big Sky.

The team played its home games at the J. Lawrence Walkup Skydome, commonly known as the Walkup Skydome, in Flagstaff, Arizona.

== Schedule ==
Date	Opponent	Rank	Site	Result	Attendance	Source
September 9	Chadron State*	No. 23	Walkup Skydome; Flagstaff, AZ	W 32–24		
September 16	at Cal State Northridge	No. 20	North Campus Stadium; Northridge, CA	W 49–26		
September 23	at New Mexico*	No. 17	University Stadium; Albuquerque, NM	L 28–35	21,553	
September 30	No. 5 Portland State	No. 17	Walkup Skydome; Flagstaff, AZ	L 10–42	6,000	
October 7	at No. 25 Idaho State	No. 24	Holt Arena; Pocatello, ID	L 21–28		
October 14	Weber State		Walkup Skydome; Flagstaff, AZ	L 10–12	8,816	
October 21	at No. 5 Montana		Washington–Grizzly Stadium; Missoula, MT	L 7–17	19,109	
October 28	Montana State		Walkup Skydome; Flagstaff, AZ	W 32–9	5,014	
November 4	at Eastern Washington		Woodward Field; Cheney, WA	L 9–27		
November 11	Sacramento State		Walkup Skydome; Flagstaff, AZ	L 24–28	2,011	
November 18	Southern Utah*		Walkup Skydome; Flagstaff, AZ (rivalry)	L 23–27		
*Non-conference game; Rankings from The Sports Network Poll released prior to the game
