= 2000 Northern Iowa Panthers football team =

American college football season

2000 Northern Iowa Panthers football
- Conference: Gateway Football Conference

Ranking
- Sports Network: No. 19
- Record: 7–4 (3–3 Gateway)
- Head coach: Mike Dunbar (4th season)
- Defensive coordinator: Jay Niemann (2nd season)
- Home stadium: UNI-Dome

2000 Gateway Football Conference standings
	Conf.			Overall
Team	W		L	W		L
No. 12 Western Illinois $^	5	–	1	9	–	3
No. 11 Youngstown State ^	4	–	2	9	–	3
No. 24 Illinois State	4	–	2	7	–	4
No. 19 Northern Iowa	3	–	3	7	–	4
Southwest Missouri State	2	–	4	5	–	6
Southern Illinois	2	–	4	3	–	8
Indiana State	1	–	5	1	–	10
$ – Conference champion; ^ – NCAA Division I-AA playoff participant; Rankings from The Sports Network poll

The 2000 Northern Iowa Panthers football team was an American football team that represented the University of Northern Iowa as a member of the Gateway Football Conference (Gateway Conference) during the 2000 NCAA Division I-AA football season. In its fourth year under head coach Mike Dunbar, the team compiled a 7–4 record (3–3 in conference games), outscored opponents by a total of 397 to 304, and finished fourth in the Gateway Conference.

Quarterback Ryan Helming, wide receiver Eddie Berlin, and defensive back Ryan Doak were named to the Division I-AA All-America team. Six Northern Iowa players were selected as first-team players on the 2000 all-Gateway Conference football team: Berlin; Helming; Doak; offensive linemen Aaron Buss and Brad Harms; and safety David Gunn. The team's statistical leaders included Helming with 3,145 passing yards and 30 passing touchdowns, Berlin with 74 receptions for 1,195 yards and 96 points scored, running back Michael Gerrell with 611 rushing yards, and Doak with seven interceptions and 138 total tackles.

The team played its home games at the UNI-Dome in Cedar Falls, Iowa.

== Schedule ==
Date	Time	Opponent	Rank	Site	TV	Result	Attendance	Source
August 31	7:05 p.m.	Morningside*	No. 10	UNI-Dome; Cedar Falls, IA		W 47–14	10,173	
September 9	8:05 p.m.	at Boise State*	No. 11	Bronco Stadium; Boise, ID		L 17–42	26,490	
September 16	12:30 p.m.	at Southern Illinois	No. 16	McAndrew Stadium; Carbondale, IL	Gateway TV	L 14–34	4,500	
September 23	4:05 p.m.	No. 10 Stephen F. Austin*		UNI-Dome; Cedar Falls, IA		W 37–30	12,206	
September 30	4:00 p.m.	No. 23 Illinois State^{†}	No. 25	UNI-Dome; Cedar Falls, IA	Gateway TV	W 34–28	13,088	
October 14	3:00 p.m.	at No. 3 Youngstown State	No. 23	Stambaugh Stadium; Youngstown, OH		L 24–28	21,119	
October 21	2:00 p.m.	at Indiana State		Memorial Stadium; Terre Haute, IN		W 49–17	5,473	
October 28	4:05 p.m.	Southwest Missouri State		UNI-Dome; Cedar Falls, IA		W 31–13	10,687	
November 4	3:00 p.m.	at Cal Poly*	No. 24	Mustang Stadium; San Luis Obispo, CA		W 43–41	4,135	
November 11	7:05 p.m.	Prairie View A&M*	No. 23	UNI-Dome; Cedar Falls, IA		W 60–14	10,263	
November 18	7:05 p.m.	No. 6 Western Illinois	No. 18	UNI-Dome; Cedar Falls, IA		L 41–44	14,128	
*Non-conference game; ^{†}Homecoming; Rankings from The Sports Network Poll released prior to the game; All times are in Central time
