= 2000 Texas Southern Tigers football team =

American college football season

2000 Texas Southern Tigers football
- Conference: Southwestern Athletic Conference
- West Division
- Record: 8–3 (5–2 SWAC)
- Head coach: William A. Thomas (7th season)
- Home stadium: Astrodome; Delmar Stadium; Rice Stadium; Robertson Stadium

2000 Southwestern Athletic Conference football standings
	Conf.			Overall
Team	W		L	W		L
East Division
Alabama A&M xy	5	–	2	7	–	5
Alabama State x	5	–	2	6	–	5
Jackson State	4	–	3	7	–	4
Mississippi Valley State	1	–	6	2	–	9
Alcorn State	0	–	7	0	–	11
West Division
No. 13 Grambling State xy$	6	–	1	10	–	2
Texas Southern	5	–	2	8	–	3
Arkansas–Pine Bluff	4	–	3	6	–	5
Southern	4	–	3	6	–	5
Prairie View A&M	1	–	6	1	–	10
Championship: Grambling State 14, Alabama A&M 6
$ – Conference champion; x – Division champion/co-champions; y – Championship game participant; Rankings from The Sports Network Poll

The 2000 Texas Southern Tigers football team represented Texas Southern University as a member of the Southwestern Athletic Conference (SWAC) during the 2000 NCAA Division I-AA football season. Led by seventh-year head coach William A. Thomas, the Tigers compiled an overall record of 8–3, with a mark of 5–2 in conference play, and finished second in the West Division of the SWAC.

== Schedule ==
Date	Opponent	Rank	Site	Result	Attendance	Source
September 2	Prairie View A&M		Astrodome; Houston, TX (Labor Day Classic)	W 42–0	26,384	
September 9	at Jackson State		Mississippi Veterans Memorial Stadium; Jackson, MS	W 19–15	9,766	
September 16	Lane*		Delmar Stadium; Houston, TX	W 31–6	2,500	
September 30	Langston*		Rice Stadium; Houston, TX	W 45–14		
October 7	Arkansas–Pine Bluff		Robertson Stadium; Houston, TX	W 21–18		
October 14	at Alcorn State		Jack Spinks Stadium; Lorman, MS	W 16–13	13,500	
October 21	Mississippi Valley State		Robertson Stadium; Houston, TX	W 30–24	17,000	
October 28	vs. No. 17 Grambling State	No. 25	Alamodome; San Antonio, TX (Alamo City Classic)	L 17–26		
November 4	at Morris Brown*		Herndon Stadium; Atlanta, GA	L 13–24		
November 11	at Southern		A. W. Mumford Stadium; Baton Rouge, LA	L 29–49		
November 18	vs. Norfolk State*		Qualcomm Stadium; San Diego, CA (Gold Coast Classic)	W 17–12	5,000	
*Non-conference game; Rankings from The Sports Network Poll released prior to the game
