= 2000 Illinois State Redbirds football team =

American college football season

2000 Illinois State Redbirds football
- Conference: Gateway Football Conference

Ranking
- Sports Network: No. 24
- Record: 7–4 (4–2 Gateway)
- Head coach: Denver Johnson (1st season)
- MVPs: Ryan Szokola; Willie Watts
- Home stadium: Hancock Stadium

2000 Gateway Football Conference standings
	Conf.			Overall
Team	W		L	W		L
No. 12 Western Illinois $^	5	–	1	9	–	3
No. 11 Youngstown State ^	4	–	2	9	–	3
No. 24 Illinois State	4	–	2	7	–	4
No. 19 Northern Iowa	3	–	3	7	–	4
Southwest Missouri State	2	–	4	5	–	6
Southern Illinois	2	–	4	3	–	8
Indiana State	1	–	5	1	–	10
$ – Conference champion; ^ – NCAA Division I-AA playoff participant; Rankings from The Sports Network poll

The 2000 Illinois State Redbirds football team represented Illinois State University as a member of the Gateway Football Conference during the 2000 NCAA Division I-AA football season. Led by first-year head coach Denver Johnson, the Redbirds compiled an overall record of 7–4 with a mark of 4–2 in conference play, tying for second place in the Gateway. Illinois State was ranked No. 24 in The Sports Network's postseason ranking of NCAA Division I-AA teams. The team played home games at Hancock Stadium in Normal, Illinois.

In their opening game against West Virginia Tech an NCAA Division II team, the Redbirds scored 75 points, the most the team had scored in a game since 1937.

== Schedule ==
Date	Time	Opponent	Rank	Site	TV	Result	Attendance	Source
August 31	6:30 p.m.	West Virginia Tech*	No. 5	Hancock Stadium; Normal, IL		W 75–10	10,126	
September 9	6:35 p.m.	at Northern Illinois*	No. 5	Huskie Stadium; DeKalb, IL		L 0–52	24,682	
September 16	6:00 p.m.	at Southeast Missouri State*	No. 17	Houck Stadium; Cape Girardeau, MO		L 25–28	8,125	
September 30	4:00 p.m.	at No. 25 Northern Iowa	No. 23	UNI-Dome; Cedar Falls, IA	Gateway TV	L 28–34	13,088	
October 7	3:30 p.m.	No. 3 Youngstown State^{†}		Hancock Stadium; Normal, IL	Gateway TV	L 12–14	11,938	
October 14	1:30 p.m.	at Indiana State		Memorial Stadium; Terre Haute, IN		W 21–0	5,287	
October 21	1:00 p.m.	Prairie View A&M*		Hancock Stadium; Normal, IL		W 64–0	7,841	
October 28	1:00 p.m.	Southern Illinois		Hancock Stadium; Normal, IL		W 27–17	13,011	
November 4	1:05 p.m.	at No. 4 Western Illinois		Hanson Field; Macomb, IL		W 25–18	10,147	
November 11	1:00 p.m.	No. 20 Eastern Illinois		Hancock Stadium; Normal, IL (rivalry)		W 44–41 ^{2OT}	8,540	
November 18	1:00 p.m.	Southwest Missouri State		Hancock Stadium; Normal, IL		W 40–7	6,527	
*Non-conference game; ^{†}Homecoming; Rankings from The Sports Network Poll released prior to the game; All times are in Central time
