= 2000 Eastern Illinois Panthers football team =

American college football season

2000 Eastern Illinois Panthers football

NCAA Division I-AA First Round, L 13–45 at Montana
- Conference: Ohio Valley Conference

Ranking
- Sports Network: No. 17
- Record: 8–4 (6–1 OVC)
- Head coach: Bob Spoo (14th season)
- Offensive coordinator: Roy Wittke (11th season)
- Defensive coordinator: Kim Dameron (1st season)
- Home stadium: O'Brien Stadium

2000 Ohio Valley Conference football standings
	Conf.			Overall
Team	W		L	W		L
No. 5 Western Kentucky $^	7	–	0	11	–	2
No. 17 Eastern Illinois ^	6	–	1	8	–	4
No. 22 Tennessee Tech	5	–	2	8	–	3
Murray State	4	–	3	6	–	5
Eastern Kentucky	3	–	4	6	–	5
Tennessee State	2	–	5	3	–	8
Southeast Missouri State	1	–	6	3	–	8
Tennessee–Martin	0	–	7	2	–	9
$ – Conference champion; ^ – NCAA Division I-AA playoff participant; Rankings from The Sports Network poll

The 2000 Eastern Illinois Panthers football team represented Eastern Illinois University as a member of the Ohio Valley Conference (OVC) during the 2000 NCAA Division I-AA football season. Led by 14th-year head coach Bob Spoo, the Panthers compiled an overall record of 8–4, finishing second in OVC with a conference mark of 6–1. Eastern Illinois was invited to the NCAA Division I-AA Football Championship playoffs, where they lost in the first round to Montana. The Bobcats were ranked 17th in the final Sports Network poll. Their starting quarterback, Tony Romo, went on to play 14 seasons in the National Football League (NFL).

== Schedule ==
Date	Opponent	Rank	Site	TV	Result	Attendance	Source
August 31	at Indiana State*		Memorial Stadium; Terre Haute, IN		W 42–24		
September 9	Kentucky Wesleyan*		O'Brien Stadium; Charleston, IL		W 72–0		
September 16	at Toledo*		Glass Bowl; Toledo, OH		L 26–31		
September 23	at Tennessee–Martin		Graham Stadium; Martin, TN		W 42–7		
October 7	Tennessee State		O'Brien Stadium; Charleston, IL		W 33–19		
October 14	Murray State		O'Brien Stadium; Charleston, IL		W 48–7		
October 21	at Tennessee Tech	No. 24	Tucker Stadium; Cookeville, TN		W 27–16		
October 28	at No. 9 Western Kentucky	No. 19	L. T. Smith Stadium; Bowling Green, KY		L 12–34	11,300	
November 4	Southeast Missouri State	No. 21	O'Brien Stadium; Charleston, IL		W 38–9		
November 11	at Illinois State*	No. 20	Hancock Stadium; Normal, IL (rivalry)		L 41–44 ^{2OT}	8,540	
November 18	Eastern Kentucky	No. 22	O'Brien Stadium; Charleston, IL		W 49–6		
November 25	at No. 1 Montana*	No. 17	Washington–Grizzly Stadium; Missoula, MT (NCAA Division I-AA First Round)	MTN	L 13–45	16,212	
*Non-conference game; Rankings from The Sports Network Poll released prior to the game
