= 2000 North Carolina A&T Aggies football team =

American college football season

2000 North Carolina A&T Aggies football
- Conference: Mid-Eastern Athletic Conference

Ranking
- Sports Network: No. 21
- Record: 8–3 (6–2 MEAC)
- Head coach: Bill Hayes (13th season)
- Home stadium: Aggie Stadium

2000 Mid-Eastern Athletic Conference football standings
	Conf.			Overall
Team	W		L	W		L
No. 14 Florida A&M $^	7	–	1	9	–	3
No. 20 Bethune–Cookman	6	–	2	9	–	2
No. 21 North Carolina A&T	6	–	2	8	–	3
Delaware State	5	–	3	7	–	4
Hampton	5	–	3	7	–	4
Howard	3	–	5	3	–	8
Norfolk State	2	–	6	3	–	8
South Carolina State	2	–	6	3	–	8
Morgan State	0	–	8	1	–	10
$ – Conference champion; ^ – NCAA Division I-AA playoff participant; Rankings from The Sports Network poll

The 2000 North Carolina A&T Aggies football team represented North Carolina A&T State University as a member of the Mid-Eastern Athletic Conference (MEAC) during the 2000 NCAA Division I-AA football season. Led by 13th-year head coach Bill Hayes, the Aggies compiled an overall record of 8–3, with a mark of 6–2 in conference play, and finished tied for second in the MEAC.

== Schedule ==
Date	Opponent	Rank	Site	Result	Attendance	Source
September 3	vs. North Carolina Central*	No. 15	Carter–Finley Stadium; Raleigh, NC (rivalry)	W 40–7	43,134	
September 9	vs. No. 15 Tennessee State*	No. 17	Cinergy Field; Cincinnati, OH (Riverfront Classic)	W 16–14	30,300	
September 23	Elon*	No. 13	Aggie Stadium; Greensboro, NC	L 0–13	18,507	
September 30	Norfolk State	No. 22	Aggie Stadium; Greensboro, NC	W 16–0	15,175	
October 7	Morgan State	No. 21	Aggie Stadium; Greensboro, NC	W 33–6	15,850	
October 14	at No. 11 Florida A&M	No. 17	Bragg Memorial Stadium; Tallahassee, FL	W 30–10	19,861	
October 21	at Howard	No. 14	William H. Greene Stadium; Washington, DC	L 16–17	9,872	
October 28	No. 22 Bethune–Cookman	No. 23	Aggie Stadium; Greensboro, NC	W 30–19		
November 4	at Delaware State	No. 18	Alumni Stadium; Dover, DE	L 45–46	3,836	
November 11	at Hampton	No. 25	Armstrong Stadium; Hampton, VA	W 31–28	10,235	
November 18	vs. South Carolina State	No. 20	Ericsson Stadium; Charlotte, NC (Carolinas Classic, rivalry)	W 66–14	22,000	
*Non-conference game; Rankings from The Sports Network Poll released prior to the game
