= 2000 Montana Grizzlies football team =

American college football season

2000 Montana Grizzlies football

Big Sky champion

NCAA Division I-AA Championship Game, L 25–27 vs. Georgia Southern
- Conference: Big Sky Conference

Ranking
- Sports Network: No. 2
- Record: 13–2 (8–0 Big Sky)
- Head coach: Joe Glenn (1st season)
- Home stadium: Washington–Grizzly Stadium

2000 Big Sky Conference football standings
	Conf.			Overall
Team	W		L	W		L
No. 2 Montana $^	8	–	0	13	–	2
No. 15 Portland State ^	5	–	3	8	–	4
No. 18 Weber State	5	–	3	7	–	4
Sacramento State	5	–	3	7	–	4
Eastern Washington	5	–	3	6	–	5
Idaho State	4	–	4	6	–	5
Cal State Northridge	2	–	6	4	–	7
Northern Arizona	2	–	6	3	–	8
Montana State	0	–	8	0	–	11
$ – Conference champion; ^ – NCAA Division I-AA playoff participant; Rankings from The Sports Network poll

The 2000 Montana Grizzlies football team represented the University of Montana as a member of the Big Sky Conference during the 2000 NCAA Division I-AA football season. Led by first-year head coach Joe Glenn, the Grizzlies compiled an overall record of 13–2 with a mark of 8–0 in conference play, winning the Big Sky title for the third consecutive season. Montana advanced to the NCAA Division I-AA Football Championship playoffs, where the Grizzlies defeated Eastern Illinois in the first round, Richmond in the quarterfinals, and Appalachian State in the semifinals before losing to Georgia Southern in the NCAA Division I-AA Championship Game. The team played home games at Washington–Grizzly Stadium in Missoula, Montana.

== Schedule ==
Date	Time	Opponent	Rank	Site	TV	Result	Attendance	Source
September 2	1:00 pm	No. 11 Hofstra*	No. 2	Washington–Grizzly Stadium; Missoula, MT	MTN	L 9–10	19,248	
September 9	2:00 pm	at Idaho*	No. 10	Martin Stadium; Pullman, WA (Little Brown Stein)	MTN	W 45–38	17,929	
September 16	1:00 pm	Cal Poly*	No. 10	Washington-Grizzly Stadium; Missoula, MT		W 53–3	19,012	
September 30	7:00 pm	at No. 18 Eastern Washington	No. 9	Joe Albi Stadium; Spokane, WA (EWU–UM Governors Cup)	MTN	W 41–31	15,678	
October 7	1:00 pm	Sacramento State^{†}	No. 9	Washington–Grizzly Stadium; Missoula, MT	MTN	W 24–20	19,264	
October 14	4:00 pm	at Cal State Northridge	No. 6	North Campus Stadium; Northridge, CA		W 34–30	3,072	
October 21	1:00 pm	Northern Arizona	No. 5	Washington–Grizzly Stadium; Missoula, MT		W 17–7	19,109	
October 28	3:00 pm	at No. 8 Portland State	No. 4	Hillsboro Stadium; Hillsboro, OR	MTN	W 33–21	9,681	
November 4	12:00 pm	Idaho State	No. 3	Washington–Grizzly Stadium; Missoula, MT		W 38–21	18,943	
November 11	1:00 pm	at No. 19 Weber State	No. 1	Stewart Stadium; Ogden, UT	MTN	W 30–28	9,632	
November 18	12:00 pm	Montana State	No. 1	Washington–Grizzly Stadium; Missoula, MT (rivalry)	MTN	W 28–3	19,367	
November 25	12:00 pm	No. 17 Eastern Illinois*	No. 1	Washington–Grizzly Stadium; Missoula, MT (NCAA Division I-AA First Round)	MTN	W 45–13	16,212	
December 2	12:00 pm	No. 10 Richmond*	No. 1	Washington–Grizzly Stadium; Missoula, MT (NCAA Division I-AA Quarterfinal)	MTN	W 34–20	17,345	
December 9	12:00 pm	No. 14 Appalachian State*	No. 1	Washington–Grizzly Stadium; Missoula, MT (NCAA Division I-AA Semifinal)	MTN	W 19–16 ^{OT}	17,401	
December 16	1:00 pm	vs. No. 5 Georgia Southern*	No. 1	Finley Stadium; Chattanooga, TN (NCAA Division I-AA Championship Game)	ESPN	L 25–27	17,156	
*Non-conference game; ^{†}Homecoming; Rankings from The Sports Network Poll released prior to the game; All times are in Mountain time

== Roster ==
2000 Montana Grizzlies football team roster
Players
Coaches
Offense

Pos.	#	Name	Class
WR	8	Jimmy Farris	Jr
OT	72	Dylan McFarland	Fr
QB	7	Drew Miller	Jr
WR	17	Etu Molden	Jr
G	73	Thatcher Szalay	Jr

Defense

Pos.	#	Name	Class
LB	45	Jacob Yoro	So

Special teams

Pos.	#	Name	Class

Head coach

- Joe Glenn (1st year)

Coordinators/assistant coaches

Legend

- (C) Team captain
- (S) Suspended
- (I) Ineligible
- Injured
- Redshirt

Roster
