= 2000 Southern Jaguars football team =

American college football season

2000 Southern Jaguars football
- Conference: Southwestern Athletic Conference
- West Division
- Record: 7–4 (4–3 SWAC)
- Head coach: Pete Richardson (8th season)
- Defensive coordinator: Terrence Graves (1st season)
- Home stadium: A. W. Mumford Stadium

2000 Southwestern Athletic Conference football standings
	Conf.			Overall
Team	W		L	W		L
East Division
Alabama A&M xy	5	–	2	7	–	5
Alabama State x	5	–	2	6	–	5
Jackson State	4	–	3	7	–	4
Mississippi Valley State	1	–	6	2	–	9
Alcorn State	0	–	7	0	–	11
West Division
No. 13 Grambling State xy$	6	–	1	10	–	2
Texas Southern	5	–	2	8	–	3
Arkansas–Pine Bluff	4	–	3	6	–	5
Southern	4	–	3	6	–	5
Prairie View A&M	1	–	6	1	–	10
Championship: Grambling State 14, Alabama A&M 6
$ – Conference champion; x – Division champion/co-champions; y – Championship game participant; Rankings from The Sports Network Poll

The 2000 Southern Jaguars football team represented Southern University as a member of the Southwestern Athletic Conference (SWAC) during the 2000 NCAA Division I-AA football season. Led by eighth-year head coach Pete Richardson, the Jaguars compiled an overall record of 7–4, with a conference record of 4–3, and finished tied for third in the SWAC West Division.

== Schedule ==
Date	Opponent	Site	Result	Attendance	Source
September 2	at Northwestern State*	Harry Turpin Stadium; Natchitoches, LA	L 14–31	17,528	
September 9	at Arkansas–Pine Bluff	War Memorial Stadium; Little Rock, AR	L 19–30		
September 16	at Prairie View A&M	Astrodome; Houston, TX	W 56–6	17,367	
September 23	vs. Jackson State	Louisiana Superdome; New Orleans, LA (rivalry)	L 10–13	49,146	
September 30	Alabama State	A. W. Mumford Stadium; Baton Rouge, LA	W 33–37 (ASU forfeit)		
October 7	at Alabama A&M	Louis Crews Stadium; Normal, AL	W 31–20	9,983	
October 21	at Alcorn State	Jack Spinks Stadium; Lorman, MS	W 30–14	20,000	
October 28	Morris Brown*	A. W. Mumford Stadium; Baton Rouge, LA	W 44–23		
November 4	No. 16 Florida A&M*	A. W. Mumford Stadium; Baton Rouge, LA	L 49–50	22,317	
November 11	Texas Southern	A. W. Mumford Stadium; Baton Rouge, LA	W 49–29		
November 25	vs. No. 12 Grambling State	Louisiana Superdome; New Orleans, LA (Bayou Classic)	W 33–29	72,000	
*Non-conference game; Rankings from The Sports Network Poll released prior to the game
