= 2000 Florida A&M Rattlers football team =

American college football season

2000 Florida A&M Rattlers football

MEAC champion

NCAA Division I-AA First Round, L 0–27 at Western Kentucky
- Conference: Mid-Eastern Athletic Conference

Ranking
- Sports Network: No. 14
- Record: 9–3 (7–1 MEAC)
- Head coach: Billy Joe (7th season)
- Offensive scheme: Gulf Coast
- Home stadium: Bragg Memorial Stadium

2000 Mid-Eastern Athletic Conference football standings
	Conf.			Overall
Team	W		L	W		L
No. 14 Florida A&M $^	7	–	1	9	–	3
No. 20 Bethune–Cookman	6	–	2	9	–	2
No. 21 North Carolina A&T	6	–	2	8	–	3
Delaware State	5	–	3	7	–	4
Hampton	5	–	3	7	–	4
Howard	3	–	5	3	–	8
Norfolk State	2	–	6	3	–	8
South Carolina State	2	–	6	3	–	8
Morgan State	0	–	8	1	–	10
$ – Conference champion; ^ – NCAA Division I-AA playoff participant; Rankings from The Sports Network poll

The 2000 Florida A&M Rattlers football team represented Florida A&M University as a member of the Mid-Eastern Athletic Conference (MEAC) during the 2000 NCAA Division I-AA football season. Led by seventh-year head coach Billy Joe, the Rattlers compiled an overall record of 9–3, with a mark of 7–1 in conference play, and finished as MEAC champion. Florida A&M finished their season with a loss against Western Kentucky in the Division I-AA playoffs.

== Schedule ==
Date	Opponent	Rank	Site	Result	Attendance	Source
September 2	at Delaware State	No. 8	Alumni Stadium; Dover, DE	W 49–21	3,851	
September 9	Morgan State	No. 8	Bragg Memorial Stadium; Tallahassee, FL	W 56–25	17,184	
September 16	vs. South Carolina State	No. 5	Alltel Stadium; Jacksonville, FL (Orange Blossom–Palmetto Classic)	W 64–9	12,200	
September 18	vs. Tennessee State*	No. 4	Georgia Dome; Atlanta, GA (Atlanta Football Classic)	W 31–6	62,455	
September 30	Howard	No. 4	Bragg Memorial Stadium; Tallahassee, FL	W 43–0	15,650	
October 7	vs. Grambling State*	No. 3	RCA Dome; Indianapolis, IN (Circle City Classic)	L 10–12	57,808	
October 14	No. 17 North Carolina A&T	No. 11	Bragg Memorial Stadium; Tallahassee, FL	L 10–30	19,861	
October 21	at Norfolk State	No. 21	William "Dick" Price Stadium; Norfolk, VA	W 42–14	3,973	
October 28	Hampton	No. 20	Bragg Memorial Stadium; Tallahassee, FL	W 53–24	28,652	
November 4	at Southern*	No. 16	A. W. Mumford Stadium; Baton Rouge, LA	W 50–49	22,317	
November 18	vs. No. 20 Bethune–Cookman	No. 13	Florida Citrus Bowl; Orlando, FL (Florida Classic)	W 31–28	70,719	
November 25	at No. 7 Western Kentucky*	No. 13	L. T. Smith Stadium; Bowling Green, KY (NCAA Division I-AA First Round)	L 0–27	3,200	
*Non-conference game; Rankings from The Sports Network Poll released prior to the game
