= 2000 Weber State Wildcats football team =

American college football season

2000 Weber State Wildcats football
- Conference: Big Sky Conference

Ranking
- Sports Network: No. 18
- Record: 7–4 (5–3 Big Sky)
- Head coach: Jerry Graybeal (3rd season)
- Home stadium: Stewart Stadium

2000 Big Sky Conference football standings
	Conf.			Overall
Team	W		L	W		L
No. 2 Montana $^	8	–	0	13	–	2
No. 15 Portland State ^	5	–	3	8	–	4
No. 18 Weber State	5	–	3	7	–	4
Sacramento State	5	–	3	7	–	4
Eastern Washington	5	–	3	6	–	5
Idaho State	4	–	4	6	–	5
Cal State Northridge	2	–	6	4	–	7
Northern Arizona	2	–	6	3	–	8
Montana State	0	–	8	0	–	11
$ – Conference champion; ^ – NCAA Division I-AA playoff participant; Rankings from The Sports Network poll

The 2000 Weber State Wildcats football team represented Weber State University as a member of the Big Sky Conference during the 2000 NCAA Division I-AA football season. Led by third-year head coach Jerry Graybeal, the Wildcats compiled an overall record of 7–4, with a mark of 5–3 in conference play, and finished tied for second in the Big Sky. The team played home games at Stewart Stadium in Ogden, Utah.

== Schedule ==
Date	Opponent	Rank	Site	Result	Attendance	Source
August 31	Western State (CO)*		Stewart Stadium; Ogden, UT	W 44–13		
September 9	at Toledo*		Glass Bowl; Toledo, OH (Food Town Kickoff)	L 0–51	32,726	
September 16	at Montana State		Bobcat Stadium; Bozeman, MT	W 28–7	7,667	
September 23	No. 22 Eastern Washington		Stewart Stadium; Ogden, UT	L 24–27 ^{2OT}	8,753	
September 30	at Sacramento State		Hornet Stadium; Sacramento, CA	L 7–35	9,157	
October 5	Cal State Northridge		Wildcat Stadium; Ogden, UT	W 31–14	8,812	
October 14	at Northern Arizona		Walkup Skydome; Flagstaff, AZ	W 12–10	8,816	
October 21	No. 2 Portland State		Stewart Stadium; Ogden, UT	W 41–9	4,879	
October 28	at Idaho State	No. 24	Holt Arena; Pocatello, ID	W 16–13		
November 4	Western New Mexico*	No. 20	Stewart Stadium; Ogden, UT	W 41–10	3,929	
November 11	No. 1 Montana	No. 19	Stewart Stadium; Ogden, UT	L 28–30	9,632	
*Non-conference game; Rankings from The Sports Network Poll released prior to the game
