= 2000 NCAA Division I-AA football season =

American college football season

2000 NCAA Division I-AA season

Regular season
- Number of teams: 121
- Duration: August–November
- Payton Award: Louis Ivory (RB, Furman)
- Buchanan Award: Edgerton Hartwell (LB, Western Illinois)

Playoff
- Duration: November 25–December 16
- Championship date: December 16, 2000
- Championship site: Finley Stadium; Chattanooga, Tennessee
- Champion: Georgia Southern

NCAA Division I-AA football seasons
- «1999 2001»

The 2000 NCAA Division I-AA football season, part of college football in the United States organized by the National Collegiate Athletic Association (NCAA) at the Division I-AA level, began in August 2000, and concluded with the 2000 NCAA Division I-AA Football Championship Game on December 16, 2000, at Finley Stadium in Chattanooga, Tennessee. The Georgia Southern Eagles won their sixth I-AA championship, defeating the Montana Grizzlies by a score of 27–25.

== Conference changes and new programs ==
School	1999 Conference	2000 Conference
Connecticut	Atlantic 10 (I-AA)	I-A Independent
Georgetown	MAAC	I-AA Independent
St. John's (NY)	I-AA Independent	Northeast

== Conference standings ==
2000 Atlantic 10 Conference football standings
	Conf.			Overall
Team	W		L	W		L
No. 3 Delaware +^	7	–	1	12	–	2
No. 6 Richmond +^	7	–	1	10	–	3
UMass	5	–	3	7	–	4
James Madison	4	–	4	6	–	5
New Hampshire	4	–	4	6	–	5
William & Mary	4	–	4	5	–	6
Maine	3	–	5	5	–	6
Villanova	3	–	5	5	–	6
Rhode Island	2	–	6	3	–	8
Northeastern	1	–	7	4	–	7
+ – Conference co-champions; ^ – NCAA Division I-AA playoff participant; Rankings from The Sports Network poll

2000 Big Sky Conference football standings
	Conf.			Overall
Team	W		L	W		L
No. 2 Montana $^	8	–	0	13	–	2
No. 15 Portland State ^	5	–	3	8	–	4
No. 18 Weber State	5	–	3	7	–	4
Sacramento State	5	–	3	7	–	4
Eastern Washington	5	–	3	6	–	5
Idaho State	4	–	4	6	–	5
Cal State Northridge	2	–	6	4	–	7
Northern Arizona	2	–	6	3	–	8
Montana State	0	–	8	0	–	11
$ – Conference champion; ^ – NCAA Division I-AA playoff participant; Rankings from The Sports Network poll

2000 Gateway Football Conference standings
	Conf.			Overall
Team	W		L	W		L
No. 12 Western Illinois $^	5	–	1	9	–	3
No. 11 Youngstown State ^	4	–	2	9	–	3
No. 24 Illinois State	4	–	2	7	–	4
No. 19 Northern Iowa	3	–	3	7	–	4
Southwest Missouri State	2	–	4	5	–	6
Southern Illinois	2	–	4	3	–	8
Indiana State	1	–	5	1	–	10
$ – Conference champion; ^ – NCAA Division I-AA playoff participant; Rankings from The Sports Network poll

2000 Ivy League football standings
	Conf.			Overall
Team	W		L	W		L
Penn $	6	–	1	7	–	3
Cornell	5	–	2	5	–	5
Yale	4	–	3	7	–	3
Harvard	4	–	3	5	–	5
Princeton	3	–	4	3	–	7
Columbia	1	–	6	3	–	7
Dartmouth	1	–	6	2	–	8
Brown *	4	–	3	7	–	3
$ – Conference champion; * Ineligible for conference championship

2000 Metro Atlantic Athletic Conference football standings
	Conf.			Overall
Team	W		L	W		L
Duquesne $	8	–	0	10	–	1
Fairfield	7	–	1	8	–	2
Marist	5	–	3	6	–	4
Georgetown	3	–	2	5	–	6
La Salle	4	–	3	7	–	4
Iona	3	–	5	4	–	7
Saint Peter's	2	–	6	4	–	7
Siena	1	–	6	1	–	9
Canisius	0	–	7	0	–	10
$ – Conference champion

2000 Mid-Eastern Athletic Conference football standings
	Conf.			Overall
Team	W		L	W		L
No. 14 Florida A&M $^	7	–	1	9	–	3
No. 20 Bethune–Cookman	6	–	2	9	–	2
No. 21 North Carolina A&T	6	–	2	8	–	3
Delaware State	5	–	3	7	–	4
Hampton	5	–	3	7	–	4
Howard	3	–	5	3	–	8
Norfolk State	2	–	6	3	–	8
South Carolina State	2	–	6	3	–	8
Morgan State	0	–	8	1	–	10
$ – Conference champion; ^ – NCAA Division I-AA playoff participant; Rankings from The Sports Network poll

2000 Northeast Conference football standings
	Conf.			Overall
Team	W		L	W		L
Robert Morris $	8	–	0	10	–	0
Sacred Heart	7	–	1	10	–	1
Wagner	6	–	2	6	–	5
Albany	5	–	3	5	–	6
Monmouth	4	–	4	5	–	6
Central Connecticut State	3	–	5	4	–	6
St. John's	2	–	6	5	–	6
Stony Brook	1	–	7	2	–	8
Saint Francis (PA)	0	–	8	0	–	11
$ – Conference champion

2000 Ohio Valley Conference football standings
	Conf.			Overall
Team	W		L	W		L
No. 5 Western Kentucky $^	7	–	0	11	–	2
No. 17 Eastern Illinois ^	6	–	1	8	–	4
No. 22 Tennessee Tech	5	–	2	8	–	3
Murray State	4	–	3	6	–	5
Eastern Kentucky	3	–	4	6	–	5
Tennessee State	2	–	5	3	–	8
Southeast Missouri State	1	–	6	3	–	8
Tennessee–Martin	0	–	7	2	–	9
$ – Conference champion; ^ – NCAA Division I-AA playoff participant; Rankings from The Sports Network poll

2000 Patriot League football standings
	Conf.			Overall
Team	W		L	W		L
No. 8 Lehigh $^	6	–	0	12	–	1
Colgate	4	–	2	7	–	4
Holy Cross	4	–	2	7	–	4
Towson	3	–	3	7	–	4
Bucknell	2	–	4	6	–	5
Fordham	1	–	5	3	–	8
Lafayette	1	–	5	2	–	9
$ – Conference champion; ^ – NCAA Division I-AA playoff participant; Rankings from The Sports Network poll

2000 Pioneer Football League standings
	Conf.			Overall
Team	W		L	W		L
Dayton +	3	–	1	8	–	3
Drake +	3	–	1	7	–	4
Valparaiso +	3	–	1	7	–	4
San Diego	1	–	3	4	–	6
Butler	0	–	4	2	–	8
+ – Conference co-champions

2000 Southern Conference football standings
	Conf.			Overall
Team	W		L	W		L
No. 1 Georgia Southern $^	7	–	1	13	–	2
No. 4 Appalachian State ^	6	–	2	10	–	4
No. 10 Furman ^	6	–	2	9	–	3
No. 23 Wofford	5	–	3	7	–	4
East Tennessee State	4	–	4	6	–	5
Chattanooga	3	–	5	5	–	6
Western Carolina	3	–	5	4	–	7
The Citadel	1	–	7	2	–	9
VMI	1	–	7	2	–	9
$ – Conference champion; ^ – NCAA Division I-AA playoff participant; Rankings from The Sports Network poll

2000 Southland Football League standings
	Conf.			Overall
Team	W		L	W		L
No. 9 Troy State $^	7	–	0	10	–	2
No. 16 McNeese State ^	5	–	2	8	–	4
No. 25 Southwest Texas State	5	–	2	7	–	4
Sam Houston State	4	–	3	7	–	4
Stephen F. Austin	3	–	4	6	–	5
Jacksonville State	2	–	5	4	–	6
Northwestern State	1	–	6	4	–	7
Nicholls State	1	–	6	2	–	9
$ – Conference champion; ^ – NCAA Division I-AA playoff participant; Northwestern State forfeited conference wins over Troy State and Nicholls State.; Rankings from The Sports Network poll

2000 Southwestern Athletic Conference football standings
	Conf.			Overall
Team	W		L	W		L
East Division
Alabama A&M xy	5	–	2	7	–	5
Alabama State x	5	–	2	6	–	5
Jackson State	4	–	3	7	–	4
Mississippi Valley State	1	–	6	2	–	9
Alcorn State	0	–	7	0	–	11
West Division
No. 13 Grambling State xy$	6	–	1	10	–	2
Texas Southern	5	–	2	8	–	3
Arkansas–Pine Bluff	4	–	3	6	–	5
Southern	4	–	3	6	–	5
Prairie View A&M	1	–	6	1	–	10
Championship: Grambling State 14, Alabama A&M 6
$ – Conference champion; x – Division champion/co-champions; y – Championship game participant; Rankings from The Sports Network Poll

2000 NCAA Division I-AA independents football standings
	Conf.			Overall
Team	W		L	W		L
Davidson		–		10	–	0
No. 7 Hofstra ^		–		9	–	4
Southern Utah		–		7	–	4
South Florida		–		7	–	4
Elon		–		7	–	4
Morehead State		–		6	–	3
Saint Mary's		–		6	–	5
Charleston Southern		–		5	–	6
Jacksonville		–		3	–	8
Samford		–		4	–	7
Cal Poly		–		3	–	8
Liberty		–		3	–	8
Austin Peay		–		2	–	9
^ – NCAA Division I-AA playoff participant; Rankings from The Sports Network poll

== Conference champions ==
Conference champions

Atlantic 10 Conference – Delaware and Richmond
Big Sky Conference – Montana
Gateway Football Conference – Western Illinois
Ivy League – Penn
Metro Atlantic Athletic Conference – Duquesne
Mid-Eastern Athletic Conference – Florida A&M
Northeast Conference – Robert Morris
Ohio Valley Conference – Western Kentucky
Patriot League – Lehigh
Pioneer Football League – Dayton and Valparaiso
Southern Conference – Georgia Southern
Southland Football League – Troy State
Southwestern Athletic Conference – Grambling State

== Postseason ==
=== NCAA Division I-AA playoff bracket ===
First Round; November 25; Campus sites
1	Montana*	45
16	Eastern Illinois	13
8	Richmond*	10
9	Youngstown State	3
5	Western Kentucky*	27
12	Florida A&M	0
4	Troy State*	30
13	Appalachian State	33
3	Georgia Southern*	42
14	McNeese State	17
6	Furman*	24
11	Hofstra	31
7	Western Illinois*	7
10	Lehigh	37
2	Delaware*	49
15	Portland State	14

Quarterfinals; December 2 Campus sites
1	Montana*	34
8	Richmond	20
5	Western Kentucky*	14
13	Appalachian State	17
3	Georgia Southern*	48
11	Hofstra	20
10	Lehigh	22
2	Delaware*	47

Semifinals; December 9 Campus sites
1	Montana*	19*
13	Appalachian State	16
3	Georgia Southern	27
2	Delaware*	18

National Championship Game; December 16; Finley Stadium; Chattanooga, TN
1	Montana	25
3	Georgia Southern	27

* By team name denotes host institution
* By score denotes overtime
