= 2000 NCAA Division I-AA football rankings =

The 2000 NCAA Division I-AA football rankings are from the Sports Network poll of Division I-AA head coaches, athletic directors, sports information directors and media members. This is for the 2000 season.

== Legend ==
	Increase in ranking
	Decrease in ranking
	Not ranked previous week
(#–#)	Win–loss record
(Italics)	Number of first place votes
т	Tied with team above or below also with this symbol

== The Sports Network poll ==
	Preseason	Week 1 Sept 5	Week 2 Sept 12	Week 3 Sept 19	Week 4 Sept 26	Week 5 Oct 3	Week 6 Oct 10	Week 7 Oct 17	Week 8 Oct 24	Week 9 Oct 31	Week 10 Nov 7	Week 11 Nov 14	Week 12 Nov 21	Week 13 Postseason	
1.	Georgia Southern (66)	Georgia Southern (0–1) (32)	Troy State (2–0) (10)	Troy State (3–0) (72)	Troy State (3–0) (68)	Georgia Southern (4–1) (63)	Georgia Southern (5–1) (75)	Georgia Southern (6–1) (79)	Georgia Southern (7–1) (81)	Georgia Southern (8–1) (81)	Montana (8–1) (78)	Montana (9–1) (84)	Montana (10–1) (61)	Georgia Southern (13–2) (48)	1.
2.	Montana (5)	Troy State (1–0) (21)	Georgia Southern (1–1) (16)	Georgia Southern (2–1) (18)	Georgia Southern (3–1) (18)	Youngstown State (4–0) (2)	Portland State (5–0) (16)	Portland State (6–0) (17)	Delaware (7–0) (9)	Delaware (8–0) (11)	Youngstown State (8–1) (11)	Delaware (9–1)	Delaware (10–1) (2)	Montana (13–2)	2.
3.	Troy State (4)	UMass (1–0) (9)	UMass (1–0) (1)	Youngstown State (3–0) (1)	Youngstown State (3–0)	Florida A&M (5–0) (7)	Youngstown State (5–0) (2)	Youngstown State (6–0)	Western Illinois (7–1) (2)	Montana (7–1) (1)	Troy State (7–2) (2)	Troy State (8–2) (3)	Troy State (9–2) (3)	Delaware (12–2)	3.
4.	UMass	Appalachian State (1–0) (12)	Hofstra (2–0)	Florida A&M (3–0)	Florida A&M (4–0) (1)	Portland State (4–0) (16)	Delaware (6–0) (4)	Delaware (7–0) (3)	Montana (6–1) (1)	Western Illinois (8–1) (3)	Delaware (8–1) (1)	Furman (8–2) (2)	Furman (9–2) (2)	Appalachian State (10–4)	4.
5.	Illinois State (4)	Illinois State (1–0) (3)	Florida A&M (2–0)	Portland State (3–0) (2)	Portland State (3–0) (4)	Troy State (3–1) (3)	Appalachian State (4–1)	Montana (5–1)	Northwestern State (6–1)	Youngstown State (7–1)	Furman (7–2) (4)	Georgia Southern (9–2)	Georgia Southern (9–2) (1)	Western Kentucky (11–2)	5.
6.	Appalachian State	Hofstra (1–0) (1)	Youngstown State (2–0)	Furman (3–0)	Furman (4–0) (1)	Furman (5–0) (1)	Montana (4–1)	Western Illinois (6–1)	Appalachian State (5–2)	Western Kentucky (8–0)	Georgia Southern (8–2)	Western Illinois (8–2)	Western Illinois (9–2)	Richmond (10–3)	6.
7.	Youngstown State	Youngstown State (1–0)	Furman (2–0)	Delaware (3–0) (2)	Appalachian State (2–1)	Delaware (5–0) (4)	Western Illinois (5–1)	Furman (6–1) (1)	Youngstown State (6–1)	Troy State (6–2)	Western Illinois (8–2) (1)	Western Kentucky (9–1)	Western Kentucky (10–1)	Hofstra (9–4)	7.
8.	Florida A&M	Florida A&M (1–0)	Appalachian State (1–1)	Appalachian State (1–1)	Delaware (4–0) (2)	Appalachian State (3–1)	James Madison (4–1)	Appalachian State (4–2)	Portland State (6–1)	Hofstra (7–2)	Lehigh (9–0)	Lehigh (10–0) (1)	Lehigh (11–0) (1)	Lehigh (12–1)	8.
9.	Furman	Furman (1–0)	Montana (1–1)	Montana (2–1)	Montana (3–1)	Montana (4–1)	Furman (5–1)	Northwestern State (5–1)	Western Kentucky (7–0)	Lehigh (8–0)	Portland State (7–2)	Youngstown State (8–2)	Youngstown State (9–2)	Troy State (9–3)	9.
10.	Northern Iowa	Montana (0–1)	James Madison (2–0)	Stephen F. Austin (3–0)	Hofstra (3–1)	Hofstra (4–1) (1)	Northwestern State (4–1)	Troy State (4–2)	Troy State (5–2)	Northwestern State (6–2)	Western Kentucky (8–1)	Richmond (8–2)	Richmond (9–2)	Furman (9–3)	10.
11.	Hofstra	Northern Iowa (1–0)	Delaware (2–0)	UMass (1–1)	UMass (2–1)	Western Illinois (4–1)	Florida A&M (5–1)	Hofstra (5–2)	Hofstra (6–2)	Furman (6–2)	Richmond (7–2)	Grambling State (9–1) (2)	Grambling State (9–1) (2)	Youngstown State (9–3)	11.
12.	Portland State	Portland State (1–0)	Portland State (1–0) (1)	Hofstra (2–1)	Western Illinois (3–1)	Villanova (3–1)	Troy State (3–2)	Western Kentucky (6–0)	Lehigh (7–0)	Portland State (6–2)	Grambling State (9–1) (1)	Hofstra (7–3)	Hofstra (8–3)	Western Illinois (9–3)	12.
13.	Southern	Delaware (1–0)	North Carolina A&T (2–0)	North Carolina A&T (2–0)	Villanova (3–1)	James Madison (3–1)	Hofstra (4–2)	Lehigh (6–0)	Furman (6–2)	Richmond (6–2)	Hofstra (7–3)	Florida A&M (8–2)	Florida A&M (9–2)	Grambling State (10–2)	13.
14.	Villanova	James Madison (1–0)	Eastern Kentucky (2–0)	Eastern Kentucky (2–0)	Stephen F. Austin (3–1)	Stephen F. Austin (3–1)	Western Kentucky (5–0)	North Carolina A&T (5–1)	UMass (5–2)	Grambling State (8–1)	Appalachian State (6–3)	Appalachian State (7–3)	Appalachian State (8–3)	Florida A&M (9–3)	14.
15.	North Carolina A&T	Tennessee State (1–0)	Stephen F. Austin (2–0)	Western Illinois (2–1)	Northwestern State (2–1)	Northwestern State (3–1)	Lehigh (5–0)	UMass (4–2)	James Madison (5–2)	Appalachian State (5–3)	Florida A&M (8–2)	Portland State (7–3)	Portland State (8–3)	Portland State (8–4)	15.
16.	Delaware	Eastern Kentucky (1–0)	Northern Iowa (1–1)	Villanova (2–1)	James Madison (2–1)	Richmond (3–1)	UMass (3–2)	James Madison (4–2)	Richmond (5–2)	Florida A&M (7–2)	McNeese State (7–2)	Bethune-Cookman (9–1)	McNeese State (8–3)	McNeese State (8–4)	16.
17.	Stephen F. Austin	North Carolina A&T (1–0)	Illinois State (1–1)	Northern Arizona (2–0)	Northern Arizona (2–1)	Lehigh (4–0)	North Carolina A&T (4–1)	McNeese State (5–1)	Grambling State (7–1)	McNeese State (6–2)	James Madison (6–3)	McNeese State (7–3)	Eastern Illinois (8–3)	Eastern Illinois (8–4)	17.
18.	James Madison	Villanova (0–1) т	Villanova (1–1)	James Madison (2–1)	Eastern Washington (3–1)	Eastern Kentucky (3–1)	Villanova (3–2)	Villanova (4–2)	Villanova (5–2)	North Carolina A&T (6–2)	Northwestern State (6–3)	Northern Iowa (7–3)	Weber State (7–4)	Weber State (7–4)	18.
19.	Tennessee State	Stephen F. Austin (1–0) т	Western Illinois (1–1)	Northwestern State (1–1)	Richmond (2–1)	UMass (2–2)	Richmond (3–2)	Richmond (4–2)	Eastern Illinois (6–1)	James Madison (5–3)	Weber State (7–3)	Weber State (7–4)	North Carolina A&T (8–3)	Northern Iowa (7–4)	19.
20.	Eastern Kentucky	Northwestern State (1–0)	Northern Arizona (1–0)	Richmond (2–1)	Lehigh (3–0)	Western Kentucky (4–0)	Eastern Washington (4–2)	Grambling State (6–1)	Florida A&M (6–2)	Weber State (6–3)	Eastern Illinois (7–2)	North Carolina A&T (7–3)	Bethune-Cookman (9–2)	Bethune-Cookman (9–2)	20.
21.	Jackson State	Jackson State (1–0)	Lehigh (1–0)	Lehigh (2–0)	Eastern Kentucky (2–1)	North Carolina A&T (3–1)	Grambling State (5–1)	Florida A&M (5–2)	McNeese State (5–2)	Eastern Illinois (6–2)	UMass (6–3)	Sam Houston State (7–3)	Northern Iowa (8–3)	North Carolina A&T (8–3)	21.
22.	Northern Arizona	Southern (0–1)	Tennessee State (1–1)	Eastern Washington (2–1)	North Carolina A&T (2–1)	Northern Iowa (3–2)	McNeese State (4–1)	Sam Houston State (5–1)	Bethune-Cookman (7–0)	UMass (5–3)	Bethune-Cookman (8–1)	Eastern Illinois (7–3)	Tennessee Tech (8–3)	Tennessee Tech (8–3)	22.
23.	Western Illinois	Northern Arizona (0–0)	Sam Houston State (2–0)	Illinois State (1–2)	New Hampshire (4–0)	Eastern Washington (3–2)	Northern Iowa (3–2)	Bethune-Cookman (7–0) (1)	North Carolina A&T (5–2)	Villanova (5–3)	Northern Iowa (6–3)	James Madison (6–4)	Wofford (7–4)	Wofford (7–4)	23.
24.	Lehigh	Sam Houston State (1–0)	Elon (1–1)	Western Kentucky (3–0)	Western Kentucky (3–0)	Northern Arizona (2–2)	Stephen F. Austin (3–2)	Eastern Illinois (5–1)	Weber State (5–3)	Northern Iowa (5–3)	New Hampshire (6–3)	Tennessee Tech (7–3)	SW Texas State (7–4)	Illinois State (7–4)	24.
25.	Colgate	Western Illinois (0–1)	Northwestern State (1–1)	New Hampshire (3–0)	Northern Iowa (2–2)	Hampton (4–1)	Idaho State (4–1)	Eastern Washington (4–3)	Texas Southern (7–0)	Bethune-Cookman (7–1)	North Carolina A&T (6–3)	Northwestern State (6–4)	Illinois State (7–4)	SW Texas State (7–4)	25.
	Preseason	Week 1 Sept 5	Week 2 Sept 12	Week 3 Sept 19	Week 4 Sept 26	Week 5 Oct 3	Week 6 Oct 10	Week 7 Oct 17	Week 8 Oct 24	Week 9 Oct 31	Week 10 Nov 7	Week 11 Nov 14	Week 12 Nov 21	Week 13 Postseason	
		Dropped: 24 Lehigh; 25 Colgate	Dropped: 21 Jackson State; 22 Southern	Dropped: 16 Northern Iowa; 22 Tennessee State; 23 Sam Houston State; 24 Elon	Dropped: 23 Illinois State	Dropped: 23 New Hampshire	Dropped: 18 Eastern Kentucky; 24 Northern Arizona; 26 Hampton	Dropped: 23 Northern Iowa; 24 Stephen F. Austin; 25 Idaho State	Dropped: 22 Sam Houston State; 25 Eastern Washington	Dropped: 25 Texas Southern	Dropped: 23 Villanova	Dropped: 21 UMass; 24 New Hampshire	Dropped: 21 Sam Houston State; 23 James Madison; 25 Northwestern State	None	
