= 2000 Jacksonville Dolphins football team =

American college football team

2000 Jacksonville Dolphins football
- Conference: Independent
- Record: 3–8
- Head coach: Steve Gilbert (3rd season)
- Defensive coordinator: Shap Boyd (1st season)
- Home stadium: D. B. Milne Field

2000 NCAA Division I-AA independents football standings
	Conf.			Overall
Team	W		L	W		L
Davidson		–		10	–	0
No. 7 Hofstra ^		–		9	–	4
Southern Utah		–		7	–	4
South Florida		–		7	–	4
Elon		–		7	–	4
Morehead State		–		6	–	3
Saint Mary's		–		6	–	5
Charleston Southern		–		5	–	6
Jacksonville		–		3	–	8
Samford		–		4	–	7
Cal Poly		–		3	–	8
Liberty		–		3	–	8
Austin Peay		–		2	–	9
^ – NCAA Division I-AA playoff participant; Rankings from The Sports Network poll

The 2000 Jacksonville Dolphins football team represented Jacksonville University as an independent during the 2000 NCAA Division I-AA football season. Led by third-year head coach Steve Gilbert, the Dolphins compiled a record of 3–8. Jacksonville played home games at D. B. Milne Field in Jacksonville, Florida.

== Schedule ==
Date	Time	Opponent	Site	Result	Attendance	Source
September 2		Lenoir–Rhyne	D. B. Milne Field; Jacksonville, FL	L 14–24	1,732	
September 9	1:30 p.m.	at Davidson	Richardson Stadium; Davidson, NC	L 7–36	2,048	
September 16		Tusculum	D. B. Milne Field; Jacksonville, FL	L 6–13	1,123	
September 30		Austin Peay	D. B. Milne Field; Jacksonville, FL	W 28–24	1,011	
October 7	1:30 p.m.	at Charleston Southern	Buccaneer Field; North Charleston, SC	L 22–28	3,698	
October 21		at Virginia–Wise	Carl Smith Stadium; Wise, VA	L 14–24	887	
October 28	1:00 p.m.	Stony Brook	D. B. Milne Field; Jacksonville, FL	W 17–14	1,061	
November 4	1:00 p.m.	at Drake	Drake Stadium; Des Moines, IA	L 0–42	4,348	
November 11		Wagner	D. B. Milne Field; Jacksonville, FL	W 31–22	1,813	
November 18		Monmouth	D. B. Milne Field; Jacksonville, FL	L 28–32	1,013	
November 24		Fairfield	D. B. Milne Field; Jacksonville, FL	L 16–38	3,765	
All times are in Eastern time
