= 2000 Chattanooga Mocs football team =

American college football season

2000 Chattanooga Mocs football
- Conference: Southern Conference
- Record: 5–6 (3–5 SoCon)
- Head coach: Donnie Kirkpatrick (1st season)
- Offensive coordinator: Donnie Kirkpatrick (3rd season)
- Defensive coordinator: Will Holthouser (1st season)
- Captains: Billy Hutchins; Chris Sanders; Brent Tinker
- Home stadium: Finley Stadium

2000 Southern Conference football standings
	Conf.			Overall
Team	W		L	W		L
No. 1 Georgia Southern $^	7	–	1	13	–	2
No. 4 Appalachian State ^	6	–	2	10	–	4
No. 10 Furman ^	6	–	2	9	–	3
No. 23 Wofford	5	–	3	7	–	4
East Tennessee State	4	–	4	6	–	5
Chattanooga	3	–	5	5	–	6
Western Carolina	3	–	5	4	–	7
The Citadel	1	–	7	2	–	9
VMI	1	–	7	2	–	9
$ – Conference champion; ^ – NCAA Division I-AA playoff participant; Rankings from The Sports Network I-AA Poll

The 2000 Chattanooga Mocs football team represented the University of Tennessee at Chattanooga as a member of the Southern Conference (SoCon) in the 2000 NCAA Division I-AA football season. The Mocs were led by first-year head coach Donnie Kirkpatrick and played their home games at Finley Stadium. They finished the season 5–6 overall and 3–5 in SoCon play to tied for sixth place.

== Schedule ==
Date	Time	Opponent	Site	Result	Attendance	Source
August 31	7:00 pm	Samford*	Finley Stadium; Chattanooga, TN	W 23–6	13,186	
September 7	7:00 pm	at UAB*	Legion Field; Birmingham, AL	L 15–20	18,000	
September 16	1:30 pm	Mississippi Valley State*	Finley Stadium; Chattanooga, TN	W 72–17	8,316	
September 23	7:00 pm	No. 2 Georgia Southern	Finley Stadium; Chattanooga, TN	L 10–31	15,072	
September 30	1:30 pm	at Wofford	Gibbs Stadium; Spartanburg, SC	L 33–41	7,879	
October 14	7:00 pm	VMI^{†}	Finley Stadium; Chattanooga, TN	W 27–14	8,842	
October 21	1:00 pm	at Western Carolina	Whitmire Stadium; Cullowhee, NC	L 36–41	8,312	
October 28	1:30 pm	No. 6 Appalachian State	Finley Stadium; Chattanooga, TN	W 30–27	4,012	
November 4	2:00 pm	at The Citadel	Johnson Hagood Stadium; Charleston, SC	W 20–13	15,442	
November 11	1:30 pm	East Tennessee State	Finley Stadium; Chattanooga, TN	L 22–24	6,432	
November 18	2:00 pm	at No. 6 Furman	Paladin Stadium; Greenville, SC	L 44–45 ^{OT}	8,573	
*Non-conference game; ^{†}Homecoming; Rankings from The Sports Network Poll released prior to the game; All times are in Eastern time
