= 2000 Villanova Wildcats football team =

American college football season

2000 Villanova Wildcats football
- Conference: Atlantic 10 Conference
- Record: 5–6 (3–5 A-10)
- Head coach: Andy Talley (16th season)
- Offensive coordinator: Sam Venuto (2nd season)
- Offensive scheme: Multiple spread
- Defensive coordinator: Joe Trainer (4th season)
- Base defense: 4–3
- Home stadium: Villanova Stadium

2000 Atlantic 10 Conference football standings
	Conf.			Overall
Team	W		L	W		L
No. 3 Delaware +^	7	–	1	12	–	2
No. 6 Richmond +^	7	–	1	10	–	3
UMass	5	–	3	7	–	4
James Madison	4	–	4	6	–	5
New Hampshire	4	–	4	6	–	5
William & Mary	4	–	4	5	–	6
Maine	3	–	5	5	–	6
Villanova	3	–	5	5	–	6
Rhode Island	2	–	6	3	–	8
Northeastern	1	–	7	4	–	7
+ – Conference co-champions; ^ – NCAA Division I-AA playoff participant; Rankings from The Sports Network poll

The 2000 Villanova Wildcats football team represented the Villanova University during the 2000 NCAA Division I-AA football season. The Wildcats were led by 16th-year head coach Andy Talley played their home games at Villanova Stadium in Villanova, Pennsylvania

== Schedule ==
Date	Opponent	Rank	Site	Result	Attendance	Source
September 2	at Rutgers*	No. 14	Rutgers Stadium; Piscataway, NJ	L 21–34	23,752	
September 9	No. 16 (D-II) Millersville*	No. T–18	Villanova Stadium; Villanova, PA	W 51–14	8,165	
September 16	at Norfolk State*	No. 18	Villanova Stadium; Villanova, PA	W 42–0	8,275	
September 23	Maine	No. 16	Villanova Stadium; Villanova, PA	W 47–12	10,557	
October 7	at No. 13 James Madison	No. 12	Bridgeforth Stadium; Harrisonburg, VA	L 23–57	13,002	
October 14	at Northeastern	No. 18	Parsons Field; Boston, MA	W 34–20	6,261	
October 21	New Hampshire	No. 18	Villanova Stadium; Villanova, PA	W 49–42	8,077	
October 28	No. 16 Richmond	No. 18	Villanova Stadium; Villanova, PA	L 18–28	9,229	
November 4	at No. 22 UMass	No. 23	McGuirk Stadium; Hadley, MA	L 17–38	9,124	
November 11	William & Mary		Villanova Stadium; Villanova, PA	L 41–48 ^{OT}	10,379	
November 18	at No. 2 Delaware		Delaware Stadium; Newark, DE (rivalry)	L 42–59	22,020	
*Non-conference game; Rankings from The Sports Network Poll released prior to the game

== Roster ==
2000 Villanova Wildcats football team roster
Players
Coaches
Offense

Pos.	#	Name	Class
RB	20	Brian Westbrook	Sr
OL	59	Adam Barondess	Sr

Defense

Pos.	#	Name	Class
DE	93	Jeff Petrone	Sr
DE	96	Tom Buczynski	Sr

Special teams

Pos.	#	Name	Class

Head coach

- Andy Talley

Coordinators/assistant coaches

Legend

- (C) Team captain
- (S) Suspended
- (I) Ineligible
- Injured
- Redshirt

Roster
