= 2000 James Madison Dukes football team =

American college football season

2000 James Madison Dukes football
- Conference: Atlantic 10 Conference
- Record: 6–5 (4–4 A-10)
- Head coach: Mickey Matthews (2nd season)
- Defensive coordinator: Dick Hopkins (2nd season)
- Home stadium: Bridgeforth Stadium

2000 Atlantic 10 Conference football standings
	Conf.			Overall
Team	W		L	W		L
No. 3 Delaware +^	7	–	1	12	–	2
No. 6 Richmond +^	7	–	1	10	–	3
UMass	5	–	3	7	–	4
James Madison	4	–	4	6	–	5
New Hampshire	4	–	4	6	–	5
William & Mary	4	–	4	5	–	6
Maine	3	–	5	5	–	6
Villanova	3	–	5	5	–	6
Rhode Island	2	–	6	3	–	8
Northeastern	1	–	7	4	–	7
+ – Conference co-champions; ^ – NCAA Division I-AA playoff participant; Rankings from The Sports Network poll

The 2000 James Madison Dukes football team was an American football team that represented James Madison University during the 2000 NCAA Division I-AA football season as a member of the Atlantic 10 Conference. In their second year under head coach Mickey Matthews, the team compiled a 6–5 record.

== Schedule ==
Date	Opponent	Rank	Site	Result	Attendance	Source
September 2	Lock Haven*	No. 18	Bridgeforth Stadium; Harrisonburg, VA	W 72–0	11,000	
September 9	Liberty*	No. 14	Bridgeforth Stadium; Harrisonburg, VA	W 38–7	10,000	
September 16	at South Florida*	No. 10	Raymond James Stadium; Tampa, FL	L 7–26	23,002	
September 30	No. 23 New Hampshire	No. 16	Bridgeforth Stadium; Harrisonburg, VA	W 24–13	10,000	
October 7	No. 12 Villanova	No. 13	Bridgeforth Stadium; Harrisonburg, VA	W 57–23	13,002	
October 14	at Rhode Island	No. 8	Meade Stadium; Kingston, RI	L 6–7	4,914	
October 21	William & Mary	No. 16	Bridgeforth Stadium; Harrisonburg, VA (rivalry)	W 28–14	10,500	
October 28	at No. 2 Delaware	No. 15	Delaware Stadium; Newark, DE (rivalry)	L 14–33	22,009	
November 4	Maine	No. 19	Bridgeforth Stadium; Harrisonburg, VA	W 22–7	14,000	
November 11	at No. 11 Richmond	No. 17	UR Stadium; Richmond, VA (Rivalry)	L 2–21	13,750	
November 18	at Northeastern	No. 23	Parsons Field; Brookline, MA	L 30–34	2,228	
*Non-conference game; Rankings from The Sports Network Poll released prior to the game
