= 2000 New Hampshire Wildcats football team =

American college football season

2000 New Hampshire Wildcats football
- Conference: Atlantic 10 Conference
- Record: 6–5 (4–4 A-10)
- Head coach: Sean McDonnell (2nd season)
- Offensive coordinator: Chip Kelly (2nd season)
- Home stadium: Cowell Stadium

2000 Atlantic 10 Conference football standings
	Conf.			Overall
Team	W		L	W		L
No. 3 Delaware +^	7	–	1	12	–	2
No. 6 Richmond +^	7	–	1	10	–	3
UMass	5	–	3	7	–	4
James Madison	4	–	4	6	–	5
New Hampshire	4	–	4	6	–	5
William & Mary	4	–	4	5	–	6
Maine	3	–	5	5	–	6
Villanova	3	–	5	5	–	6
Rhode Island	2	–	6	3	–	8
Northeastern	1	–	7	4	–	7
+ – Conference co-champions; ^ – NCAA Division I-AA playoff participant; Rankings from The Sports Network poll

The 2000 New Hampshire Wildcats football team was an American football team that represented the University of New Hampshire as a member of the Atlantic 10 Conference during the 2000 NCAA Division I-AA football season. In its second year under head coach Sean McDonnell, the team compiled a 6–5 record (4–4 against conference opponents) and finished in a tie for fourth place in the Atlantic 10 Conference.

== Schedule ==
Date	Opponent	Rank	Site	Result	Attendance	Source
September 2	at Hampton*		Armstrong Stadium; Hampton, VA	W 31–17		
September 9	Rhode Island		Cowell Stadium; Durham, NH	W 13–12	3,403	
September 16	Northeastern		Cowell Stadium; Durham, NH	W 24–7		
September 23	Dartmouth*	No. 25	Cowell Stadium; Durham, NH (rivalry)	W 42–21	5,157	
September 30	at No. 16 James Madison	No. 23	Bridgeforth Stadium; Harrisonburg, VA	L 13–24	10,000	
October 14	No. 19 Richmond		Cowell Stadium; Durham, NH	L 10–31	6,268	
October 21	at No. 18 Villanova		Villanova Stadium; Villanova, PA	L 42–49	8,077	
October 28	No. 14 UMass		Cowell Stadium; Durham, NH (rivalry)	W 24–16	6,349	
November 4	at No. 2 Delaware		Delaware Stadium; Newark, DE	W 45–44 ^{OT}	21,854	
November 11	Gardner–Webb*		Cowell Stadium; Durham, NH	L 35–38		
November 18	at Maine		Alfond Stadium; Orono, ME (Battle for the Brice-Cowell Musket)	L 10–55	2,272	
*Non-conference game; Rankings from The Sports Network Poll released prior to the game
