= 2000 East Tennessee State Buccaneers football team =

American college football season

2000 East Tennessee State Buccaneers football
- Conference: Southern Conference
- Record: 6–5 (4–4 SoCon)
- Head coach: Paul Hamilton (4th season)
- Home stadium: Memorial Center

2000 Southern Conference football standings
	Conf.			Overall
Team	W		L	W		L
No. 1 Georgia Southern $^	7	–	1	13	–	2
No. 4 Appalachian State ^	6	–	2	10	–	4
No. 10 Furman ^	6	–	2	9	–	3
No. 23 Wofford	5	–	3	7	–	4
East Tennessee State	4	–	4	6	–	5
Chattanooga	3	–	5	5	–	6
Western Carolina	3	–	5	4	–	7
The Citadel	1	–	7	2	–	9
VMI	1	–	7	2	–	9
$ – Conference champion; ^ – NCAA Division I-AA playoff participant; Rankings from The Sports Network poll

The 2000 East Tennessee State Buccaneers football team was an American football team that represented East Tennessee State University as a member of the Southern Conference (SoCon) during the 2000 NCAA Division I-AA football season. Led by fourth-year head coach Paul Hamilton, the Buccaneers compiled an overall record of 6–5, with a mark of 4–4 in conference play, and finished fifth in the SoCon.

== Schedule ==
Date	Time	Opponent	Site	Result	Attendance	Source
September 2	7:00 p.m.	at Liberty*	Williams Stadium; Lynchburg, VA	W 37–20	6,279	
September 9	4:00 p.m.	at Colorado State*	Hughes Stadium; Fort Collins, CO	L 7–41	25,122	
September 16	4:00 p.m.	VMI	Memorial Center; Johnson City, TN	W 38–3	5,218	
September 23	6:00 p.m.	at Western Carolina	E. J. Whitmire Stadium; Cullowhee, NC	L 27–39	4,214	
September 30		No. 7 Appalachian State	Memorial Center; Johnson City, TN	L 13–30	7,092	
October 7	2:00 p.m.	at The Citadel	Johnson Hagood Stadium; Charleston, SC	W 20–7	15,236	
October 21		No. 7 Furman	Memorial Center; Johnson City, TN	W 23–21	5,079	
October 28		at No. 1 Georgia Southern	Paulson Stadium; Statesboro, GA	L 7–42	17,008	
November 4	2:00 p.m.	Wofford	Memorial Center; Johnson City, TN	L 31–35	5,852	
November 11	1:30 p.m.	at Chattanooga	Finley Stadium; Chattanooga, TN	W 24–22	6,432	
November 18	7:00 p.m.	Charleston Southern*	Memorial Center; Johnson City, TN	W 55–7	6,102	
*Non-conference game; Rankings from The Sports Network Poll released prior to the game; All times are in Eastern time
