= 2000 Hofstra Pride football team =

American college football season

2000 Hofstra Pride football

NCAA Division I-AA Quarterfinal, L 20–48 at Georgia Southern
- Conference: Independent

Ranking
- Sports Network: No. 7
- Record: 9–4
- Head coach: Joe Gardi (11th season)
- Offensive coordinator: Dave Brock (1st season)
- Defensive coordinator: Dan Quinn (1st season)
- Captains: Adam Brown; Ian "Rocky" Butler; Steve Jackson
- Home stadium: James M. Shuart Stadium

2000 NCAA Division I-AA independents football standings
	Conf.			Overall
Team	W		L	W		L
Davidson		–		10	–	0
No. 7 Hofstra ^		–		9	–	4
Southern Utah		–		7	–	4
South Florida		–		7	–	4
Elon		–		7	–	4
Morehead State		–		6	–	3
Saint Mary's		–		6	–	5
Charleston Southern		–		5	–	6
Jacksonville		–		3	–	8
Samford		–		4	–	7
Cal Poly		–		3	–	8
Liberty		–		3	–	8
Austin Peay		–		2	–	9
^ – NCAA Division I-AA playoff participant; Rankings from The Sports Network poll

The 2000 Hofstra Pride football team represented Hofstra University during the 2000 NCAA Division I-AA football season. It was the program's 60th season, and they competed as an Independent. The Pride earned a berth into the 16-team Division I-AA playoffs, but lost in the quarterfinals to eventual national champion Georgia Southern, 48–20. They finished #7 in the final national poll and were led by 11th-year head coach Joe Gardi.

The 2000 season was the first in which Hofstra went by the nickname "Pride." The previous spring, the school decided to change the nickname for their sports teams from Flying Dutchmen and Flying Dutchwomen to go into effect the 2000–01 school year.

== Schedule ==
Date	Time	Opponent	Rank	Site	TV	Result	Attendance	Source
September 2	3:00 p.m.	at No. 2 Montana*	No. 11	Washington–Grizzly Stadium; Missoula, MT	Omega TV	W 10–9	19,248	
September 9		at Maine*	No. 6	Alfond Stadium; Orono, ME	Metro TV	W 51–30	8,220	
September 16	7:00 p.m.	No. 11 Delaware*	No. 4	James M. Shuart Stadium; Hempstead, NY	MSG Network	L 14–44	7,706	
September 23		Rhode Island*	No. 12	James M. Shuart Stadium; Hempstead, NY	MSG Network	W 30–12	3,209	
September 30	6:00 p.m.	at No. 11 UMass*	No. 10	Warren McGuirk Alumni Stadium; Hadley, MA	Fox Sports	W 51–36	10,143	
October 7		at No. 4 Portland State*	No. 10	Hillsboro Stadium; Hillsboro, OR		L 35–40	8,824	
October 13		Liberty*	No. 13	James M. Shuart Stadium; Hempstead, NY		W 42–14	4,354	
October 21		Elon*^{†}	No. 11	James M. Shuart Stadium; Hempstead, NY	Fox Sports	W 38–27	7,276	
October 28		at Cal Poly*	No. 11	Mustang Stadium; San Luis Obispo, CA	Fox Sports	W 33–30	3,532	
November 4		at No. 5 Youngstown State*	No. 8	Stambaugh Stadium; Youngstown, OH	Metro TV	L 35–42 ^{2OT}	16,832	
November 18		Albany*	No. 12	James M. Shuart Stadium; Hempstead, NY	Metro TV	W 55–28	3,752	
November 25		at No. 4 Furman*	No. 12	Paladin Stadium; Greenville, SC (NCAA Division I-AA First Round)	Fox Sports	W 31–24	4,214	
December 2		at No. 5 Georgia Southern*	No. 12	Paulson Stadium; Statesboro, GA (NCAA Division I-AA Quarterfinal)	Metro TV	L 20–48	7,139	
*Non-conference game; ^{†}Homecoming; Rankings from The Sports Network Poll released prior to the game; All times are in Eastern time

== Awards and honors ==
- First Team All-America – Doug Shanahan (The Sports Network, The Football Gazette); Khary Williams (AFCA)
- Second Team All-America – Khary Williams (Associated Press)
- Third Team All-America – Charlie Adams (Associated Press); Doug Shanahan (Associated Press); Khary Williams (The Sports Network); Dan Zorger (Associated Press, The Sports Network)
- Honorable Mention All-America – Charlie Adams (The Football Gazette); Khary Williams (The Football Gazette)
- First Team I-AA Independents – Charlie Adams, Rocky Butler, Trevor Dimmie, Rich Holzer, Doug Shanahan
- Second Team I-AA Independents – Michael Curry, Ryan Fletcher, Jim Mayer, Robert Thomas, Joe Todd, Khary Williams, Dennis Winters
- ECAC Second Team – Rocky Butler, Doug Shanahan, Khary Williams
- I-AA Independents Offensive Player of the Year – Rocky Butler
