= 2000 Charleston Southern Buccaneers football team =

American college football season

2000 Charleston Southern Buccaneers football
- Conference: Independent
- Record: 5–6
- Head coach: David Dowd (10th season)
- Defensive coordinator: Todd Knight (3rd season)
- Home stadium: Buccaneer Field

2000 NCAA Division I-AA independents football standings
	Conf.			Overall
Team	W		L	W		L
Davidson		–		10	–	0
No. 7 Hofstra ^		–		9	–	4
Southern Utah		–		7	–	4
South Florida		–		7	–	4
Elon		–		7	–	4
Morehead State		–		6	–	3
Saint Mary's		–		6	–	5
Charleston Southern		–		5	–	6
Jacksonville		–		3	–	8
Samford		–		4	–	7
Cal Poly		–		3	–	8
Liberty		–		3	–	8
Austin Peay		–		2	–	9
^ – NCAA Division I-AA playoff participant; Rankings from The Sports Network poll

The 2000 Charleston Southern Buccaneers football team represented Charleston Southern University as an independent during the 2000 NCAA Division I-AA football season. Led by 10th-year head coach David Dowd, the Buccaneers compiled a record of 5–6. Charleston Southern played home games at Buccaneer Field in North Charleston, South Carolina.

== Schedule ==
Date	Time	Opponent	Site	Result	Attendance	Source
September 2	1:30 pm	Guilford	Buccaneer Field; North Charleston, SC	W 58–0	1,734	
September 9	1:30 pm	at Presbyterian	Bailey Stadium; Clinton, SC	L 13–28	1,564	
September 16	1:30 pm	West Virginia State	Buccaneer Field; North Charleston, SC	W 30–6	1,457	
September 23	1:30 pm	Wofford	Buccaneer Field; North Charleston, SC	L 10–24	1,539	
October 7	1:30 pm	Jacksonville	Buccaneer Field; North Charleston, SC	W 28–22	3,698	
October 14	2:00 pm	at Austin Peay	Governors Stadium; Clarksville, TN	W 42–20	3,842	
October 21	1:00 pm	at VMI	Alumni Memorial Field; Lexington, VA	L 7–40	5,070	
October 28	1:00 pm	Elon	Buccaneer Field; North Charleston, SC	L 12–28	1,102	
November 4	2:30 pm	at Samford	Seibert Stadium; Homewood, AL	L 14–21 ^{OT}	4,220	
November 11	1:30 pm	at Liberty	Williams Stadium; Lynchburg, VA	W 25–0	3,237	
November 18	7:00 pm	at East Tennessee State	Memorial Center; Johnson City, TN	L 7–55	6,102	
All times are in Eastern time
