= 2000 VMI Keydets football team =

American college football season

2000 VMI Keydets football
- Conference: Southern Conference
- Record: 2–9 (1–7 SoCon)
- Head coach: Cal McCombs (2nd season)
- Offensive coordinator: Bob Gatling (2nd season)
- Home stadium: Alumni Memorial Field

2000 Southern Conference football standings
	Conf.			Overall
Team	W		L	W		L
No. 1 Georgia Southern $^	7	–	1	13	–	2
No. 4 Appalachian State ^	6	–	2	10	–	4
No. 10 Furman ^	6	–	2	9	–	3
No. 23 Wofford	5	–	3	7	–	4
East Tennessee State	4	–	4	6	–	5
Chattanooga	3	–	5	5	–	6
Western Carolina	3	–	5	4	–	7
The Citadel	1	–	7	2	–	9
VMI	1	–	7	2	–	9
$ – Conference champion; ^ – NCAA Division I-AA playoff participant; Rankings from The Sports Network I-AA Poll

The 2000 VMI Keydets football team represented the Virginia Military Institute during the 2000 NCAA Division I-AA football season. It was the Keydets' 110th year of football and second season under head coach Cal McCombs.

The Keydets endured a 2–9 campaign, which included wins over Charleston Southern and a 41–21 victory over The Citadel in the Military Classic of the South.

== Schedule ==
Date	Time	Opponent	Site	Result	Attendance	Source
September 2	1:00 pm	Duquesne*	Alumni Memorial Field; Lexington, VA	L 31–57	5,837	
September 9	1:00 pm	at William & Mary*	Zable Stadium; Williamsburg, VA (rivalry)	L 15–55	8,252	
September 16	4:00 pm	at East Tennessee State	Memorial Center; Johnson City, TN	L 3–38	5,218	
September 23	1:00 pm	No. 10 Furman	Alumni Memorial Field; Lexington, VA	L 21–35	5,046	
September 30	1:00 pm	at No. 1 Georgia Southern	Paulson Stadium; Statesboro, GA	L 3–56	13,794	
October 7	1:00 pm	No. 23 Wofford	Alumni Memorial Field; Lexington, VA	L 28–45	7,068	
October 14	7:00 pm	at Chattanooga	Finley Stadium; Chattanooga, TN	L 14–27	8,842	
October 21	1:00 pm	Charleston Southern*	Alumni Memorial Field; Lexington, VA	W 40–7	5,070	
October 28	1:00 pm	Western Carolina	Alumni Memorial Field; Lexington, VA	L 31–41	5,275	
November 4	2:00 pm	at No. 15 Appalachian State	Kidd Brewer Stadium; Boone, NC	L 0–52	8,617	
November 11	1:00 pm	The Citadel	Alumni Memorial Field; Lexington, VA (Military Classic of the South)	W 41–21	9,411	
*Non-conference game; Rankings from The Sports Network Poll released prior to the game; All times are in Eastern time
