= 2000 Maine Black Bears football team =

American college football season

2000 Maine Black Bears football
- Conference: Atlantic 10 Conference
- Record: 5–6 (3–5 A-10)
- Head coach: Jack Cosgrove (8th season)
- Offensive coordinator: Bobby Wilder (1st season)
- Captains: Ben Christopher; Paul Paradis; Dwayne Wilmot
- Home stadium: Alfond Stadium

2000 Atlantic 10 Conference football standings
	Conf.			Overall
Team	W		L	W		L
No. 3 Delaware +^	7	–	1	12	–	2
No. 6 Richmond +^	7	–	1	10	–	3
UMass	5	–	3	7	–	4
James Madison	4	–	4	6	–	5
New Hampshire	4	–	4	6	–	5
William & Mary	4	–	4	5	–	6
Maine	3	–	5	5	–	6
Villanova	3	–	5	5	–	6
Rhode Island	2	–	6	3	–	8
Northeastern	1	–	7	4	–	7
+ – Conference co-champions; ^ – NCAA Division I-AA playoff participant; Rankings from The Sports Network poll

The 2000 Maine Black Bears football team was an American football team that represented the University of Maine as a member of the Atlantic 10 Conference during the 2000 NCAA Division I-AA football season. In their eighth season under head coach Jack Cosgrove, the Black Bears compiled a 5–6 record (3–5 against conference opponents) and tied for seventh place in the conference. Ben Christopher, Paul Paradis, and Dwayne Wilmot were the team captains.

== Schedule ==
Date	Opponent	Site	Result	Attendance	Source
August 31	vs. Kutztown*	Portland, ME	W 45–0	5,455	
September 9	No. 6 Hofstra*	Alfond Stadium; Orono, ME	L 30–51	8,220	
September 16	Howard*	Alfond Stadium; Orono, ME	W 38–21	5,153	
September 23	at No. 16 Villanova	Villanova Stadium; Villanova, PA	L 21–47	10,557	
September 30	William & Mary	Alfond Stadium; Orono, ME	L 28–31	4,924	
October 14	at UMass	McGuirk Stadium; Hadley, MA	L 10–31	12,136	
October 21	at No. 19 Richmond	University of Richmond Stadium; Richmond, VA	L 6–17	10,075	
October 28	Rhode Island	Alfond Stadium; Orono, ME	W 37–7	4,745	
November 4	at No. 19 James Madison	Bridgeforth Stadium; Harrisonburg, VA	L 7–22	14,000	
November 11	Northeastern	Alfond Stadium; Orono, ME	W 42–17	2,578	
November 18	New Hampshire	Alfond Stadium; Orono, ME (Battle for the Brice–Cowell Musket)	W 55–10	2,272	
*Non-conference game; Rankings from The Sports Network Poll released prior to the game
