= 2000 Rhode Island Rams football team =

American college football season

2000 Rhode Island Rams football
- Conference: Atlantic 10 Conference
- Record: 3–8 (2–7 A-10)
- Head coach: Tim Stowers (1st season)
- Offensive coordinator: Harold Nichols (1st season)
- Home stadium: Meade Stadium

2000 Atlantic 10 Conference football standings
	Conf.			Overall
Team	W		L	W		L
No. 3 Delaware +^	7	–	1	12	–	2
No. 6 Richmond +^	7	–	1	10	–	3
UMass	5	–	3	7	–	4
James Madison	4	–	4	6	–	5
New Hampshire	4	–	4	6	–	5
William & Mary	4	–	4	5	–	6
Maine	3	–	5	5	–	6
Villanova	3	–	5	5	–	6
Rhode Island	2	–	6	3	–	8
Northeastern	1	–	7	4	–	7
+ – Conference co-champions; ^ – NCAA Division I-AA playoff participant; Rankings from The Sports Network poll

The 2000 Rhode Island Rams football team was an American football team that represented the University of Rhode Island in the Atlantic 10 Conference during the 2000 NCAA Division I-AA football season. In their first season under head coach Tim Stowers, the Rams compiled a 3–8 record (2–7 against conference opponents) and finished ninth out of ten teams in the conference.

== Schedule ==
Date	Opponent	Site	Result	Attendance	Source
September 2	No. 16 Delaware	Meade Stadium; Kingston, RI	L 7–29	3,016	
September 9	at New Hampshire	Cowell Stadium; Durham, NH	L 12–13	3,403	
September 23	at No. 12 Hofstra	James M. Shuart Stadium; Hempstead, NY	L 12–30	3,209	
September 30	Brown	Meade Stadium; Kingston, RI (rivalry)	L 19–29	4,173	
October 7	at William & Mary	Zable Stadium; Williamsburg, VA	L 16–26	5,358	
October 14	No. 8 James Madison^{†}	Meade Stadium; Kingston, RI	W 7–6	4,914	
October 21	at Northeastern	Parsons Field; Brookline, MA	W 38–24	3,233	
October 28	at Maine	Alfond Stadium; Orono, ME	L 7–37	4,745	
November 4	No. 13 Richmond	Meade Stadium; Kingston, RI	L 10–13 ^{OT}	3,681	
November 11	at Connecticut	Memorial Stadium; Storrs, CT (rivalry)	W 26–21	9,591	
November 18	UMass	Meade Stadium; Kingston, RI	L 21–29	3,876	
^{†}Homecoming; Rankings from The Sports Network Poll released prior to the game
