= 2000 Western Carolina Catamounts football team =

American college football season

2000 Western Carolina Catamounts football
- Conference: Southern Conference
- Record: 4–7 (3–5 SoCon)
- Head coach: Bill Bleil (4th season)
- Home stadium: E. J. Whitmire Stadium

2000 Southern Conference football standings
	Conf.			Overall
Team	W		L	W		L
No. 1 Georgia Southern $^	7	–	1	13	–	2
No. 4 Appalachian State ^	6	–	2	10	–	4
No. 10 Furman ^	6	–	2	9	–	3
No. 23 Wofford	5	–	3	7	–	4
East Tennessee State	4	–	4	6	–	5
Chattanooga	3	–	5	5	–	6
Western Carolina	3	–	5	4	–	7
The Citadel	1	–	7	2	–	9
VMI	1	–	7	2	–	9
$ – Conference champion; ^ – NCAA Division I-AA playoff participant; Rankings from The Sports Network I-AA Poll

The 2000 Western Carolina Catamounts team was an American football team that represented Western Carolina University as a member of the Southern Conference (SoCon) during the 2000 NCAA Division I-AA football season. In their fourth year under head coach Bill Bleil, the team compiled an overall record of 4–7, with a mark of 3–5 in conference play, and finished tied for sixth in the SoCon.

== Schedule ==
Date	Time	Opponent	Site	Result	Attendance	Source
September 2	8:00 p.m.	at LSU*	Tiger Stadium; Baton Rouge, LA	L 0–58	87,188	
September 9	6:00 p.m.	Lenoir–Rhyne*	E. J. Whitmire Stadium; Cullowhee, NC	W 53–10	8,714	
September 16	7:00 p.m.	at The Citadel	Johnson Hagood Stadium; Charleston, SC	L 10–17	12,281	
September 23	6:00 p.m.	East Tennessee State	E. J. Whitmire Stadium; Cullowhee, NC	W 39–27	4,214	
September 30	2:00 p.m.	at No. 6 Furman	Paladin Stadium; Greenville, SC	L 14–38	9,387	
October 7	6:00 p.m.	No. 1 Georgia Southern	E. J. Whitmire Stadium; Cullowhee, NC	L 24–42	7,114	
October 14	1:30 p.m.	at Wofford	Gibbs Stadium; Spartanburg, SC	L 31–40	8,024	
October 21	1:00 p.m.	Chattanooga	E. J. Whitmire Stadium; Cullowhee, NC	W 41–36	8,312	
October 28	1:00 p.m.	at VMI	Alumni Memorial Field; Lexington, VA	W 41–31	5,275	
November 11	1:00 p.m.	No. 14 Appalachian State	E. J. Whitmire Stadium; Cullowhee, NC (rivalry)	L 28–35	10,207	
November 18	1:00 p.m.	Tennessee Tech*	E. J. Whitmire Stadium; Cullowhee, NC	L 35–37	4,828	
*Non-conference game; Rankings from The Sports Network Poll released prior to the game; All times are in Eastern time
