= 2000 Wofford Terriers football team =

American college football season

2000 Wofford Terriers football
- Conference: Southern Conference

Ranking
- Sports Network: No. 23
- Record: 7–4 (5–3 SoCon)
- Head coach: Mike Ayers (13th season)
- Home stadium: Gibbs Stadium

2000 Southern Conference football standings
	Conf.			Overall
Team	W		L	W		L
No. 1 Georgia Southern $^	7	–	1	13	–	2
No. 4 Appalachian State ^	6	–	2	10	–	4
No. 10 Furman ^	6	–	2	9	–	3
No. 23 Wofford	5	–	3	7	–	4
East Tennessee State	4	–	4	6	–	5
Chattanooga	3	–	5	5	–	6
Western Carolina	3	–	5	4	–	7
The Citadel	1	–	7	2	–	9
VMI	1	–	7	2	–	9
$ – Conference champion; ^ – NCAA Division I-AA playoff participant; Rankings from The Sports Network I-AA Poll

The 2000 Wofford Terriers football team was an American football team that represented Wofford College as a member of the Southern Conference (SoCon) during the 2000 NCAA Division I-AA football season. Led by 13th-year head coach Mike Ayers, the Terriers compiled and overall record of 7–4, with a mark of 5–3 in conference play, and finished fourth in the SoCon.

== Schedule ==
Date	Time	Opponent	Site	Result	Attendance	Source
September 9	7:00 p.m.	Lehigh*	Gibbs Stadium; Spartanburg, SC	L 14–34	8,413	
September 16	1:00 p.m.	at No. 2 Georgia Southern	Paulson Stadium; Statesboro, GA	L 17–24	14,055	
September 23	1:30 p.m.	at Charleston Southern*	Buccaneer Field; North Charleston, SC	W 24–10	1,539	
September 30	1:30 p.m.	Chattanooga	Gibbs Stadium; Spartanburg, SC	W 41–33	7,879	
October 7	1:00 p.m.	at VMI	Alumni Memorial Field; Lexington, VA	W 45–28	7,068	
October 14	1:30 p.m.	Western Carolina	Gibbs Stadium; Spartanburg, SC	W 40–31	8,024	
October 21	2:00 p.m.	at No. 8 Appalachian State	Kidd Brewer Stadium; Boone, NC	L 16–42	17,647	
October 28	1:30 p.m.	The Citadel	Gibbs Stadium; Spartanburg, SC (rivalry)	W 31–10	8,672	
November 4	2:00 p.m.	at East Tennessee State	Memorial Center; Johnson City, TN	W 35–31	5,852	
November 11	3:30 p.m.	No. 5 Furman	Gibbs Stadium; Spartanburg, SC (rivalry)	L 18–27	10,002	
November 18	3:00 p.m.	at Louisiana–Monroe*	Malone Stadium; Monroe, LA	W 24–6	4,208	
*Non-conference game; Rankings from The Sports Network Poll released prior to the game; All times are in Eastern time
