= 2000 William & Mary Tribe football team =

American college football season

2000 William & Mary Tribe football
- Conference: Atlantic 10 Conference
- Record: 5–6 (4–4 A-10)
- Head coach: Jimmye Laycock (21st season)
- Offensive coordinator: Zbig Kepa (8th season)
- Defensive coordinator: Brian Vaganek (1st season)
- Captains: Todd Greineder; Matt Mazefsky; Chris Rosier; Raheem Walker
- Home stadium: Zable Stadium

2000 Atlantic 10 Conference football standings
	Conf.			Overall
Team	W		L	W		L
No. 3 Delaware +^	7	–	1	12	–	2
No. 6 Richmond +^	7	–	1	10	–	3
UMass	5	–	3	7	–	4
James Madison	4	–	4	6	–	5
New Hampshire	4	–	4	6	–	5
William & Mary	4	–	4	5	–	6
Maine	3	–	5	5	–	6
Villanova	3	–	5	5	–	6
Rhode Island	2	–	6	3	–	8
Northeastern	1	–	7	4	–	7
+ – Conference co-champions; ^ – NCAA Division I-AA playoff participant; Rankings from The Sports Network poll

The 2000 William & Mary Tribe football team represented the College of William & Mary as member of the Atlantic 10 Conference (A-10) during the 2000 NCAA Division I-AA football season. Led by Jimmye Laycock in his 21st year as head coach, William & Mary finished the season with an overall record of 5–6 and a mark of 4–4 in A-10 play, tying for fourth place.

== Schedule ==
Date	Time	Opponent	Site	Result	Attendance	Source
August 31	7:00 pm	at No. 2 UMass	Warren McGuirk Alumni Stadium; Hadley, MA	L 16–36	10,176	
September 9	1:00 pm	VMI*	Zable Stadium; Williamsburg, VA (rivalry)	W 55–15	8,252	
September 16	7:00 pm	at No. 8 Furman*	Paladin Stadium; Greenville, SC	L 10–34	8,742	
September 23	6:00 pm	at UCF*	Florida Citrus Bowl; Orlando, FL	L 7–52	23,164	
September 30	7:00 pm	at Maine	Alfond Stadium; Orono, ME	W 31–28	4,924	
October 7	1:00 pm	Rhode Island	Zable Stadium; Williamsburg, VA	W 26–16	5,358	
October 14	1:00 pm	No. 4 Delaware	Zable Stadium; Williamsburg, VA (rivalry)	L 17–28	7,416	
October 21	1:30 pm	at No. 16 James Madison	Bridgeforth Stadium; Harrisonburg, VA (rivalry)	L 14–28	10,500	
October 28	1:00 pm	Northeastern	Zable Stadium; Williamsburg, VA	W 26–15	8,208	
November 11	1:00 pm	at Villanova	Villanova Stadium; Villanova, PA	W 48–41 ^{OT}	10,379	
November 18	12:00 pm	No. 10 Richmond	Zable Stadium; Williamsburg, VA (I-64 Bowl)	L 18–21	6,651	
*Non-conference game; Rankings from The Sports Network Poll released prior to the game; All times are in Eastern time
