= 2000 Samford Bulldogs football team =

American college football season

2000 Samford Bulldogs football
- Conference: Independent
- Record: 4–7
- Head coach: Pete Hurt (7th season)
- Offensive coordinator: Joel Williams (2nd season)
- Co-defensive coordinators: Richard Koehler (1st season); Mike O'Toole (1st season)
- Home stadium: Seibert Stadium

2000 NCAA Division I-AA independents football standings
	Conf.			Overall
Team	W		L	W		L
Davidson		–		10	–	0
No. 7 Hofstra ^		–		9	–	4
Southern Utah		–		7	–	4
South Florida		–		7	–	4
Elon		–		7	–	4
Morehead State		–		6	–	3
Saint Mary's		–		6	–	5
Charleston Southern		–		5	–	6
Jacksonville		–		3	–	8
Samford		–		4	–	7
Cal Poly		–		3	–	8
Liberty		–		3	–	8
Austin Peay		–		2	–	9
^ – NCAA Division I-AA playoff participant; Rankings from The Sports Network poll

The 2000 Samford Bulldogs football team represented Samford University as an independent during the 2000 NCAA Division I-AA football season. Led by sixth-year head coach Pete Hurt, the Bulldogs compiled an overall record of 4–7. The team played home games at Seibert Stadium in Homewood, Alabama.

== Schedule ==
Date	Time	Opponent	Site	Result	Attendance	Source
August 31	7:00 p.m.	at Chattanooga	Finley Stadium; Chattanooga, TN	L 6–23	13,186	
September 7	7:00 p.m.	Murray State	Seibert Stadium; Homewood, AL	W 19–17	5,580	
September 14	7:00 p.m.	Tennessee–Martin	Seibert Stadium; Homewood, AL	W 49–17	5,378	
September 21	7:00 p.m.	at Jacksonville State	Paul Snow Stadium; Jacksonville, AL (rivalry)	L 16–36	14,127	
September 30	6:00 p.m.	Nicholls State	Seibert Stadium; Homewood, AL	W 28–10	7,231	
October 5	7:00 p.m.	at North Texas	Fouts Field; Denton, TX	L 6–41	8,712	
October 14	1:00 p.m.	at Elon	Burlington Memorial Stadium; Burlington, NC	L 21–43	3,021	
October 21	1:00 p.m.	Gardner–Webb	Seibert Stadium; Homewood, AL	L 17–36	4,012	
October 28	12:30 p.m.	at Liberty	Williams Stadium; Lynchburg, VA	L 0–24	5,813	
November 4	1:30 p.m.	Charleston Southern^{†}	Seibert Stadium; Homewood, AL	W 21–14 ^{OT}	4,220	
November 9	7:00 p.m.	at Tennessee Tech	Tucker Stadium; Cookeville, TN	L 0–29	1,800	
^{†}Homecoming; All times are in Central time
