= 2000 Cal Poly Mustangs football team =

American college football season

2000 Cal Poly Mustangs football
- Conference: Independent
- Record: 3–8
- Head coach: Larry Welsh (4th season)
- Home stadium: Mustang Stadium

2000 NCAA Division I-AA independents football standings
	Conf.			Overall
Team	W		L	W		L
Davidson		–		10	–	0
No. 7 Hofstra ^		–		9	–	4
Southern Utah		–		7	–	4
South Florida		–		7	–	4
Elon		–		7	–	4
Morehead State		–		6	–	3
Saint Mary's		–		6	–	5
Charleston Southern		–		5	–	6
Jacksonville		–		3	–	8
Samford		–		4	–	7
Cal Poly		–		3	–	8
Liberty		–		3	–	8
Austin Peay		–		2	–	9
^ – NCAA Division I-AA playoff participant; Rankings from The Sports Network poll

The 2000 Cal Poly Mustangs football team represented California Polytechnic State University, San Luis Obispo as an independent during the 2000 NCAA Division I-AA football season. Led by Larry Welsh in his fourth and final season as head coach, Cal Poly compiled a record of 3–8 for the third consecutive year. The team was outscored by its opponents 395 to 201 for the season. The Mustangs played home games at Mustang Stadium in San Luis Obispo, California.

Welsh finished his four-year tenure as head coach with a record of 19–25, for a .431 winning percentage.

== Schedule ==
Date	Time	Opponent	Site	Result	Attendance	Source
September 9		at Sacramento State	Hornet Stadium; Sacramento, CA	L 18–37	16,557	
September 16		at No. 9 Montana	Washington–Grizzly Stadium; Missoula, MT	L 3–53	19,012	
September 23		at Montana State	Bobcat Stadium; Bozeman, MT	W 35–14	4,757	
September 30		at Southern Utah	Eccles Coliseum; Cedar City, UT	L 13–42		
October 7		Saint Mary's	Mustang Stadium; San Luis Obispo, CA	W 41–20		
October 14		Western New Mexico	Mustang Stadium; San Luis Obispo, CA	W 52–10		
October 21		No. 10 (West) (D-II) UC Davis	Mustang Stadium; San Luis Obispo, CA (rivalry)	L 28–63		
October 28		No. 11 Hofstra	Mustang Stadium; San Luis Obispo, CA	L 30–33	3,532	
November 4	1:00 p.m.	No. 24 Northern Iowa	Mustang Stadium; San Luis Obispo, CA	L 41–43	4,135	
November 11		at Cal State Northridge	North Campus Stadium; Northridge, CA	L 27–45	1,915	
November 18		No. 9 Youngstown State	Mustang Stadium; San Luis Obispo, CA	L 13–35	4,178	
Rankings from The Sports Network Poll released prior to the game; All times are in Pacific time

== Team players in the NFL ==
No Cal Poly Mustang players were selected in the 2001 NFL draft. The following finished their college career in 2000, were not drafted, but played in the NFL.

Player	Position	First NFL team
James Tuthill	Kicker	2001 Green Bay Packers
