= Joe Susan =

American football player and coach (born 1955)

Current position
- Title: Special assistant to the head coach
- Team: Rutgers
- Conference: Big Ten

Biographical details
- Born: September 18, 1955 (age 71)

Playing career
- 1973–1976: Delaware
- Position: Offensive lineman

Coaching career (HC unless noted)
- 1977–1978: Delaware (GA)
- 1979: Gettysburg (assistant)
- 1980: Delaware (GA)
- 1981–1991: Bucknell (OL)
- 1991–1999: Princeton (OC)
- 2000: Davidson
- 2001–2009: Rutgers (OL/TE)
- 2010–2018: Bucknell
- 2020–present: Rutgers (special assistant to HC)

Administrative career (AD unless noted)
- 2019: Bucknell (special assistant to AD)

Head coaching record
- Overall: 48–61

Joseph Susan (born September 18, 1955) is an American college football coach and former player. He is the special assistant to the head football coach at Rutgers University, a position he has held since 2020. He was previously the head football coach for the Bucknell Bison of the Patriot League. Susan's second coaching stint at Bucknell (he was an assistant from 1981 to 1990) came on the heels of a nine-year tenure as the Rutgers Scarlet Knights offensive line and tight ends coach under Greg Schiano. He has been a head coach at one other school—Davidson College, where he led the Wildcats to the program's only perfect season in 2000. Susan stayed at Davidson for just that season.

Susan grew up in South River, New Jersey and played college football at the University of Delaware from 1973 to 1976. In his senior season, he was named the Newark Touchdown Club Offensive Lineman of the Year. The Fightin' Blue Hens won two Lambert Cups and were the NCAA Division II runners-up during his playing tenure.

== Head coaching record ==
Year	Team	Overall	Conference	Standing	Bowl/playoffs
Davidson Wildcats (NCAA Division I-AA independent) (2000)
2000	Davidson	10–0			
Davidson:		10–0			
Bucknell Bison (Patriot League) (2010–2018)
2010	Bucknell	1–10	1–5	T–5th	
2011	Bucknell	6–5	3–3	4th	
2012	Bucknell	3–8	1–5	6th	
2013	Bucknell	6–5	3–2	T–2nd	
2014	Bucknell	8–3	4–2	2nd	
2015	Bucknell	4–7	1–5	6th	
2016	Bucknell	4–7	3–3	4th	
2017	Bucknell	5–6	2–4	6th	
2018	Bucknell	1–10	1–5	7th	
Bucknell:		38–61	19–34		
Total:		48–61			
