= 2000 Appalachian State Mountaineers football team =

American college football season

2000 Appalachian State Mountaineers football

NCAA Division I-AA Semifinal, L 16–19 at Montana
- Conference: Southern Conference

Ranking
- Sports Network: No. 4
- Record: 10–4 (6–2 SoCon)
- Head coach: Jerry Moore (12th season)
- Home stadium: Kidd Brewer Stadium

2000 Southern Conference football standings
	Conf.			Overall
Team	W		L	W		L
No. 1 Georgia Southern $^	7	–	1	13	–	2
No. 4 Appalachian State ^	6	–	2	10	–	4
No. 10 Furman ^	6	–	2	9	–	3
No. 23 Wofford	5	–	3	7	–	4
East Tennessee State	4	–	4	6	–	5
Chattanooga	3	–	5	5	–	6
Western Carolina	3	–	5	4	–	7
The Citadel	1	–	7	2	–	9
VMI	1	–	7	2	–	9
$ – Conference champion; ^ – NCAA Division I-AA playoff participant; Rankings from The Sports Network poll

The 2000 Appalachian State Mountaineers football team was an American football team that represented Appalachian State University as a member of the Southern Conference (SoCon) during the 2000 NCAA Division I-AA football season. In their 12th year under head coach Jerry Moore, the Mountaineers compiled an overall record of 10–4, with a conference mark of 6–2. Appalachian State advanced to the NCAA Division I-AA Football Championship playoffs, where they upset Troy State in the first round, Western Kentucky in the quarterfinals, and lost to Montana in the semifinals.

== Schedule ==
Date	Opponent	Rank	Site	Result	Attendance	Source
August 31	at Wake Forest*	No. 6	Groves Stadium; Winston-Salem, NC	W 20–16	26,853	
September 9	No. 4 Troy State*	No. 2	Kidd Brewer Stadium; Boone, NC	L 28–34	16,631	
September 23	The Citadel	No. 8	Kidd Brewer Stadium; Boone, NC	W 61–14	16,997	
September 30	at East Tennessee State	No. 7	Memorial Center; Johnson City, TN	W 30–13	7,092	
October 7	No. 6 Furman	No. 8	Kidd Brewer Stadium; Boone, NC	W 18–17	11,671	
October 14	at No. 1 Georgia Southern	No. 5	Paulson Stadium; Statesboro, GA (rivalry)	L 28–34	21,899	
October 21	Wofford	No. 8	Kidd Brewer Stadium; Boone, NC	W 42–16	17,647	
October 28	at Chattanooga	No. 6	Finley Stadium; Chattanooga, TN	L 27–30	4,012	
November 4	VMI	No. 15	Kidd Brewer Stadium; Boone, NC	W 52–0	8,617	
November 11	at Western Carolina	No. 14	Whitmire Stadium; Cullowhee, NC (rivalry)	W 35–28	10,207	
November 18	Liberty*	No. 14	Kidd Brewer Stadium; Boone, NC	W 34–13	6,531	
November 25	at No. 3 Troy State*	No. 14	Veterans Memorial Stadium; Troy, AL (NCAA Division I-AA First Round)	W 33–30	4,916	
December 2	at No. 7 Western Kentucky*	No. 14	L. T. Smith Stadium; Bowling Green, KY (NCAA Division I-AA Quarterfinal)	W 17–14	5,100	
December 9	at No. 1 Montana*	No. 14	Washington–Grizzly Stadium; Missoula, MT (NCAA Division I-AA Semifinal)	L 16–19 ^{OT}	17,401	
*Non-conference game; Rankings from The Sports Network Poll released prior to the game
