= 2000 Richmond Spiders football team =

American college football season

2000 Richmond Spiders football

A-10 co-champion

NCAA Division I-AA Quarterfinal, L 20–34 vs. Montana
- Conference: Atlantic 10 Conference

Ranking
- Sports Network: No. 6
- Record: 10–3 (7–1 A-10)
- Head coach: Jim Reid (6th season)
- Offensive coordinator: Greg Gregory (1st season)
- Captains: Eric Beatty; Harold Hill; Mac Janney
- Home stadium: UR Stadium

2000 Atlantic 10 Conference football standings
	Conf.			Overall
Team	W		L	W		L
No. 3 Delaware +^	7	–	1	12	–	2
No. 6 Richmond +^	7	–	1	10	–	3
UMass	5	–	3	7	–	4
James Madison	4	–	4	6	–	5
New Hampshire	4	–	4	6	–	5
William & Mary	4	–	4	5	–	6
Maine	3	–	5	5	–	6
Villanova	3	–	5	5	–	6
Rhode Island	2	–	6	3	–	8
Northeastern	1	–	7	4	–	7
+ – Conference co-champions; ^ – NCAA Division I-AA playoff participant; Rankings from The Sports Network poll

The 2000 Richmond Spiders football team represented the University of Richmond during the 2000 NCAA Division I-AA football season. It was the program's 117th season and they finished as Atlantic 10 Conference (A-10) co-champions with Delaware after posting identical 7–1 conference records. The Spiders earned a berth as the #8 seed into the 16-team Division I-AA playoffs, but lost in the quarterfinals to #1 seed Montana, 20–34. Richmond was led by sixth-year head coach Jim Reid.

The Spiders' win over Arkansas State in week four was their first against a Division I-A opponent since 1985.

== Schedule ==
Date	Time	Opponent	Rank	Site	Result	Attendance	Source
September 2	7:00 p.m.	Bucknell*		University of Richmond Stadium; Richmond, VA	W 10–7	14,100	
September 9	3:30 p.m.	at Virginia*		Scott Stadium; Charlottesville, VA	L 6–34	50,285	
September 16	1:00 p.m.	No. 3 UMass		University of Richmond Stadium; Richmond, VA	W 31–24	10,200	
September 30		at Arkansas State*	No. 19	Indian Stadium; Jonesboro, AR	W 30–27	13,116	
October 7	1:00 p.m.	No. 7 Delaware	No. 16	University of Richmond Stadium; Richmond, VA	L 17–24	13,100	
October 14	1:00 p.m.	at New Hampshire	No. 19	Wildcat Stadium; Durham, NH	W 31–10	6,268	
October 21		Maine^{†}	No. 19	University of Richmond Stadium; Richmond, VA	W 17–6	10,075	
October 28	1:00 p.m.	at No. 8 Villanova	No. 16	Villanova Stadium; Villanova, PA	W 28–18	9,229	
November 4	12:00 p.m.	at Rhode Island	No. 13	Meade Stadium; Kingston, RI	W 13–10 ^{OT}	3,681	
November 11	12:00 p.m.	No. 17 James Madison	No. 11	University of Richmond Stadium; Richmond, VA (rivalry)	W 21–2	13,750	
November 18	12:00 p.m.	at William & Mary	No. 10	Zable Stadium; Williamsburg, VA (I-64 Bowl)	W 21–18	6,651	
November 25	2:00 p.m.	No. 9 Youngstown State*	No. 10	University of Richmond Stadium; Richmond, VA (NCAA Division I-AA First Round)	W 10–3	5,484	
December 2	2:00 p.m.	at No. 1 Montana*	No. 10	Washington–Grizzly Stadium; Missoula, MT (NCAA Division I-AA Quarterfinal)	L 20–34	17,345	
*Non-conference game; ^{†}Homecoming; Rankings from The Sports Network Poll released prior to the game; All times are in Eastern time

== Awards and honors ==
- Second Team All-America – Eric Beatty (Associated Press, The Sports Network); Josh Spraker (Associated Press)
- First Team All-Atlantic 10 – Eric Beatty, Josh Spraker
- Second Team All-Atlantic 10 – Michael Millard, Mac Janney
- Third Team All-Atlantic 10 – Chad Blackstock, Harold Hill, Ken Farrar, David Lewandoski, Mark Thompson, TyRonne Turner
- Atlantic 10 Coach of the Year – Jim Reid
