= 2000 Furman Paladins football team =

American college football season

2000 Furman Paladins football

NCAA Division I-AA First Round, L 24–31 vs. Hofstra
- Conference: Southern Conference
- Record: 9–3 (6–2 SoCon)
- Head coach: Bobby Johnson (7th season)
- Captains: Josh Moore; Marion Martin; Justin Hill; Will Bouton; Derek Russell
- Home stadium: Paladin Stadium

2000 Southern Conference football standings
	Conf.			Overall
Team	W		L	W		L
No. 1 Georgia Southern $^	7	–	1	13	–	2
No. 4 Appalachian State ^	6	–	2	10	–	4
No. 10 Furman ^	6	–	2	9	–	3
No. 23 Wofford	5	–	3	7	–	4
East Tennessee State	4	–	4	6	–	5
Chattanooga	3	–	5	5	–	6
Western Carolina	3	–	5	4	–	7
The Citadel	1	–	7	2	–	9
VMI	1	–	7	2	–	9
$ – Conference champion; ^ – NCAA Division I-AA playoff participant; Rankings from The Sports Network poll

The 2000 Furman Paladins football team was an American football team that represented Furman University as a member of the Southern Conference (SoCon) during the 2000 NCAA Division I-AA football season. In their seventh year under head coach Bobby Johnson, the Paladins compiled an overall record of 9–3 with a conference mark of 7–2, finishing tied for second in the SoCon. Furman advanced to the NCAA Division I-AA Football Championship playoffs, where they were upset by Hofstra in the first round.

== Schedule ==
Date	Opponent	Rank	Site	Result	Attendance	Source
September 2	Elon*	No. 9	Paladin Stadium; Greenville, SC	W 16–3	10,702	
September 9	Newberry*	No. 9	Paladin Stadium; Greenville, SC	W 44–10	11,214	
September 16	William & Mary*	No. 8	Paladin Stadium; Greenville, SC	W 34–10	8,742	
September 23	at VMI	No. 10	Alumni Memorial Field; Lexington, VA	W 35–21	5,046	
September 30	Western Carolina	No. 6	Paladin Stadium; Greenville, SC	W 38–14	9,387	
October 7	at No. 8 Appalachian State	No. 6	Kidd Brewer Stadium; Boone, NC	L 17–18	11,671	
October 14	The Citadel	No. 9	Paladin Stadium; Greenville, SC (rivalry)	W 33–7	13,326	
October 21	at East Tennessee State	No. 7	Memorial Center; Johnson City, TN	L 21–23	5,079	
November 4	No. 1 Georgia Southern	No. 11	Paladin Stadium; Greensville, SC	W 45–10	15,127	
November 11	at Wofford*	No. 5	Gibbs Stadium; Spartanburg, SC (rivalry)	W 27–18	10,002	
November 18	Chattanooga	No. 4	Paladin Stadium; Greenville, SC	W 45–44 ^{OT}	8,573	
November 25	No. 12 Hofstra*	No. 4	Paladin Stadium; Greenville, SC (NCAA Division I-AA First Round)	L 24–31	4,214	
*Non-conference game; Rankings from The Sports Network Poll released prior to the game
