= 2000 UMass Minutemen football team =

American college football season

2000 UMass Minutemen football
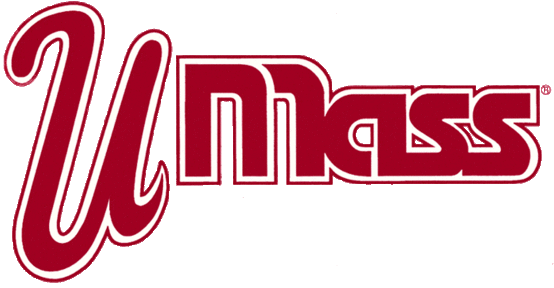
- Conference: Atlantic 10 Conference
- Record: 7–4 (5–3 A-10)
- Head coach: Mark Whipple (3rd season)
- Offensive scheme: Pro-style
- Defensive coordinator: Neil McGrath (1st season)
- Base defense: 4–3
- Home stadium: Warren McGuirk Alumni Stadium

2000 Atlantic 10 Conference football standings
| | Conf. | | | Overall |
| Team | W | | L | W | | L |
|---|---|---|---|---|---|---|
| No. 3 Delaware +^ | 7 | – | 1 | 12 | – | 2 |
| No. 6 Richmond +^ | 7 | – | 1 | 10 | – | 3 |
| UMass | 5 | – | 3 | 7 | – | 4 |
| James Madison | 4 | – | 4 | 6 | – | 5 |
| New Hampshire | 4 | – | 4 | 6 | – | 5 |
| William & Mary | 4 | – | 4 | 5 | – | 6 |
| Maine | 3 | – | 5 | 5 | – | 6 |
| Villanova | 3 | – | 5 | 5 | – | 6 |
| Rhode Island | 2 | – | 6 | 3 | – | 8 |
| Northeastern | 1 | – | 7 | 4 | – | 7 |
+ – Conference co-champions; ^ – NCAA Division I-AA playoff participant; Rankings from The Sports Network poll

The 2000 UMass Minutemen football team represented the University of Massachusetts Amherst in the 2000 NCAA Division I-AA football season as a member of the Atlantic 10 Conference. The team was coached by Mark Whipple and played its home games at Warren McGuirk Alumni Stadium in Hadley, Massachusetts. The 2000 Minutemen failed to reach the postseason for the first time since 1997. UMass finished the season with a record of 7–4 overall and 5–3 in conference play.

== Schedule ==
| Date | Time | Opponent | Rank | Site | Result | Attendance |
|---|---|---|---|---|---|---|
| August 31 | 7:00 p.m. | William & Mary | No. 4 | McGuirk Stadium; Hadley, MA | W 36–16 | 10,176 |
| September 16 | 1:00 p.m. | at Richmond | No. 3 | UR Stadium; Richmond, VA | L 24–31 | 10,200 |
| September 23 | 1:00 p.m. | No. 23 (D-II) New Haven* | No. 11 | McGuirk Stadium; Hadley, MA | W 39–29 | 9,122 |
| September 30 | 6:00 p.m. | No. 10 Hofstra* | No. 11 | McGuirk Stadium; Hadley, MA | L 36–51 | 10,143 |
| October 7 | 12:30 p.m. | at Northeastern | No. 19 | Parsons Field; Brookline, MA | W 21–16 | 4,184 |
| October 14 | 1:00 p.m. | Maine | No. 16 | McGuirk Stadium; Hadley, MA | W 33–10 | 12,136 |
| October 21 | 1:00 p.m. | American International* | No. 15 | McGuirk Stadium; Hadley, MA | W 21–0 | 10,627 |
| October 28 | 12:00 p.m. | at New Hampshire | No. 14 | Cowell Stadium; Durham, NH (rivalry) | L 16–24 | 6,349 |
| November 4 | 12:00 p.m. | No. 23 Villanova^{†} | No. 22 | McGuirk Stadium; Hadley, MA | W 38–17 | 9,124 |
| November 11 | 12:00 p.m. | No. 4 Delaware | No. 21 | McGuirk Stadium; Hadley, MA | L 19–31 | 8,680 |
| November 18 | 12:00 p.m. | at Rhode Island | | Meade Stadium; Kingston, RI | W 29–21 | 3,876 |
*Non-conference game; ^{†}Homecoming; Rankings from The Sports Network Poll released prior to the game; All times are in Eastern time

== Roster ==
2000 UMass Minutemen football team roster
Players
Coaches
Offense

| Pos. | # | Name | Class |
|---|---|---|---|
| WR | 15 | Eric Bross | Jr |
| WR | 81 | Steve King | So |
| WR | 84 | Adonis Kinsey | So |
| G | 68 | Tyler Lauback | Sr |
| WR | 22 | Steve Ley | Sr |
| TB | 27 | Troy Lockman | Sr |
| RB | 46 | Nate Long | Fr |
| QB | 11 | Richard Lucero | Jr |
| TB | 5 | Marcel Shipp | Sr |

Defense

| Pos. | # | Name | Class |
|---|---|---|---|
| LB | 69 | Andres Acosta | Fr |
| DL | 97 | Pierre Alfred | Jr |
| LB | 19 | Leron Ancle | Fr |
| DL | 74 | Michael Earner | Fr |
| LB | 50 | Kole Ayi | Sr |
| DE | 83 | Valdamar Brower | Fr |
| LB | 35 | Bryan Buckley | Fr |
| LB | 59 | Larry Cabrelli | Fr |
| LB | 10 | Jeremy Cain | Fr |
| DB | 37 | Brian Smith | Sr |

Special teams

| Pos. | # | Name | Class |

Head coach

- Mark Whipple

Coordinators/assistant coaches

Legend

- (C) Team captain
- (S) Suspended
- (I) Ineligible
- Injured
- Redshirt

Roster
Last update: 2001-04-17
