= 2000 The Citadel Bulldogs football team =

American college football season

2000 The Citadel Bulldogs football
- Conference: Southern Conference
- Record: 2–9 (1–7 SoCon)
- Head coach: Don Powers (5th season)
- Home stadium: Johnson Hagood Stadium

2000 Southern Conference football standings
	Conf.			Overall
Team	W		L	W		L
No. 1 Georgia Southern $^	7	–	1	13	–	2
No. 4 Appalachian State ^	6	–	2	10	–	4
No. 10 Furman ^	6	–	2	9	–	3
No. 23 Wofford	5	–	3	7	–	4
East Tennessee State	4	–	4	6	–	5
Chattanooga	3	–	5	5	–	6
Western Carolina	3	–	5	4	–	7
The Citadel	1	–	7	2	–	9
VMI	1	–	7	2	–	9
$ – Conference champion; ^ – NCAA Division I-AA playoff participant; Rankings from The Sports Network I-AA Poll

The 2000 The Citadel Bulldogs football team represented The Citadel, The Military College of South Carolina in the 2000 NCAA Division I-AA football season. Don Powers served as head coach for the fifth season. The Bulldogs played as members of the Southern Conference and played home games at Johnson Hagood Stadium.

== Schedule ==
Date	Time	Opponent	Site	TV	Result	Attendance	Source
September 2	6:00 pm	at No. 17 (I-A) Clemson*	Memorial Stadium; Clemson, SC		L 0–38	75,086	
September 9	7:00 pm	at No. 13 Delaware*	Delaware Stadium; Newark, DE		L 0–38	22,075	
September 16	7:00 pm	Western Carolina	Johnson Hagood Stadium; Charleston, SC		W 17–10	12,281	
September 23	2:00 pm	at No. 8 Appalachian State	Kidd Brewer Stadium; Boone, NC		L 14–61	16,997	
September 30	4:00 pm	South Carolina State*	Johnson Hagood Stadium; Charleston, SC		W 45–16	16,362	
October 7	2:00 pm	East Tennessee State	Johnson Hagood Stadium; Charleston, SC		L 7–20	15,236	
October 14	2:00 pm	at No. 9 Furman	Paladin Stadium; Greenville, SC (rivalry)		L 7–33	13,326	
October 21	3:30 pm	No. 1 Georgia Southern	Johnson Hagood Stadium; Charleston, SC	FSNS	L 10–27	12,391	
October 28	1:30 pm	at Wofford	Gibbs Stadium; Spartanburg, SC (rivalry)		L 10–31	8,672	
November 4	2:00 pm	Chattanooga^{†}	Johnson Hagood Stadium; Charleston, SC		L 13–20 ^{OT}	15,442	
November 11	1:00 pm	at VMI	Alumni Memorial Field; Lexington, VA (Military Classic of the South)		L 21–41	9,411	
*Non-conference game; ^{†}Homecoming; Rankings from The Sports Network Poll released prior to the game; All times are in Eastern time
