= 2000 Delaware Fightin' Blue Hens football team =

American college football season

2000 Delaware Fightin' Blue Hens football

A-10 co–champion Lambert Cup winner

NCAA Division I-AA Semifinal, L 18–27 vs. Georgia Southern
- Conference: Atlantic 10 Conference

Ranking
- Sports Network: No. 3
- Record: 12–2 (7–1 A-10)
- Head coach: Tubby Raymond (35th season)
- Offensive coordinator: Ted Kempski (33rd season)
- Offensive scheme: Delaware Wing-T
- Defensive coordinator: Bob Sabol (10th season)
- Base defense: 4–3
- Home stadium: Delaware Stadium

2000 Atlantic 10 Conference football standings
	Conf.			Overall
Team	W		L	W		L
No. 3 Delaware +^	7	–	1	12	–	2
No. 6 Richmond +^	7	–	1	10	–	3
UMass	5	–	3	7	–	4
James Madison	4	–	4	6	–	5
New Hampshire	4	–	4	6	–	5
William & Mary	4	–	4	5	–	6
Maine	3	–	5	5	–	6
Villanova	3	–	5	5	–	6
Rhode Island	2	–	6	3	–	8
Northeastern	1	–	7	4	–	7
+ – Conference co-champions; ^ – NCAA Division I-AA playoff participant; Rankings from The Sports Network poll

The 2000 Delaware Fightin' Blue Hens football team represented the University of Delaware as a member of the Atlantic 10 Conference (A-10) during the 2000 NCAA Division I-AA football season. Led by 35th-year head coach Tubby Raymond, the Fightin' Blue Hens compiled an overall record of 12–2 with a mark of 7–1 in conference play, sharing the A-10 title with Richmond. Delaware advanced to the NCAA Division I-AA Football Championship playoffs, where the Fightin' Blue Hens beat Portland State in the first round and Lehigh in the quarterfinals before losing to the eventual national champion, Georgia Southern, in the semifinals. The team played home games at Delaware Stadium in Newark, Delaware.

== Schedule ==
Date	Time	Opponent	Rank	Site	Result	Attendance	Source
September 2	12:00 pm	at Rhode Island	No. 16	Meade Stadium; Kingston, RI	W 29–7	3,016	
September 9	7:00 pm	The Citadel*	No. 13	Delaware Stadium; Newark, DE	W 38–0	22,075	
September 16	7:00 pm	at No. 4 Hofstra*	No. 11	James M. Shuart Stadium; Hempstead, NY	W 44–14	7,706	
September 23	7:00 pm	West Chester*	No. 7	Delaware Stadium; Newark, DE (rivalry)	W 84–0	21,152	
September 30	1:00 pm	Northeastern	No. 8	Delaware Stadium; Newark, DE	W 42–0	17,811	
October 7	1:00 pm	at No. 16 Richmond	No. 7	University of Richmond Stadium; Richmond, VA	W 24–17	13,100	
October 14	1:00 pm	at William & Mary	No. 4	Zable Stadium; Williamsburg, VA (rivalry)	W 28–17	7,416	
October 28	12:00 pm	No. 15 James Madison	No. 2	Delaware Stadium; Newark, DE (rivalry)	W 33–14	22,009	
November 4	1:00 pm	New Hampshire	No. 2	Delaware Stadium; Newark, DE	L 44–45 ^{OT}	21,854	
November 11	12:00 pm	at No. 21 UMass	No. 4	Warren McGuirk Alumni Stadium; Hadley, MA	W 31–19	8,680	
November 18	1:00 pm	Villanova	No. 2	Delaware Stadium; Newark, DE (Battle of the Blue)	W 59–42	22,020	
November 25	12:00 pm	No. 15 Portland State*	No. 2	Delaware Stadium; Newark, DE (NCAA Division I-AA First Round)	W 49–14	12,945	
December 2	12:00 pm	No. 8 Lehigh*	No. 2	Delaware Stadium; Newark, DE (NCAA Division I-AA Quarterfinal, rivalry)	W 49–22	16,390	
December 9	12:00 pm	No. 5 Georgia Southern*	No. 2	Delaware Stadium; Newark, DE (NCAA Division I-AA Semifinal)	L 18–27	15,035	
*Non-conference game; Rankings from The Sports Network Poll released prior to the game; All times are in Eastern time
