= 2000 Georgia Southern Eagles football team =

American college football season

2000 Georgia Southern Eagles football

NCAA Division I-AA champion SoCon champion

NCAA Division I-AA Championship Game, W 27–25 vs. Montana Grizzlies
- Conference: Southern Conference

Ranking
- Sports Network: No. 1
- Record: 13–2 (7–1 SoCon)
- Head coach: Paul Johnson (4th season)
- Offensive coordinator: Mike Sewak (4th season)
- Offensive scheme: Triple option
- Defensive coordinator: Rusty Russell (4th season)
- Base defense: 4–3
- Home stadium: Paulson Stadium

2000 Southern Conference football standings
	Conf.			Overall
Team	W		L	W		L
No. 1 Georgia Southern $^	7	–	1	13	–	2
No. 4 Appalachian State ^	6	–	2	10	–	4
No. 10 Furman ^	6	–	2	9	–	3
No. 23 Wofford	5	–	3	7	–	4
East Tennessee State	4	–	4	6	–	5
Chattanooga	3	–	5	5	–	6
Western Carolina	3	–	5	4	–	7
The Citadel	1	–	7	2	–	9
VMI	1	–	7	2	–	9
$ – Conference champion; ^ – NCAA Division I-AA playoff participant; Rankings from The Sports Network poll

The 2000 Georgia Southern Eagles football team represented Georgia Southern University as a member of the Southern Conference (SoCon) during the 2000 NCAA Division I-AA football season. Led by fourth-year head coach Paul Johnson, the Eagles compiled an overall record of 13–2 with a mark of 7–1 in conference play, winning the SoCon title. Georgia Southern advanced to the NCAA Division I-AA Football Championship playoffs, where they defeated McNeese State in the first round, Hofstra in the quarterfinals, Delaware in the semifinals, and Montana Grizzlies in the NCAA Division I-AA Football Championship Game, winning the program's second consecutive and sixth overall NCAA Division I-AA title. The Eagles played their home games at Paulson Stadium in Statesboro, Georgia.

== Schedule ==
Date	Time	Opponent	Rank	Site	TV	Result	Attendance	Source
September 2	6:00 pm	at No. 10 (I-A) Georgia*	No. 1	Sanford Stadium; Athens, GA		L 7–29	86,520	
September 9		Johnson C. Smith*	No. 1	Paulson Stadium; Statesboro, GA		W 57–12	16,684	
September 16	1:00 pm	Wofford	No. 2	Paulson Stadium; Statesboro, GA		W 24–17	14,055	
September 23	7:00 pm	at Chattanooga	No. 2	Finley Stadium; Chattanooga, TN		W 31–10	15,072	
September 30	1:00 pm	VMI	No. 2	Paulson Stadium; Statesboro, GA		W 50–14	13,794	
October 7	6:00 pm	at Western Carolina	No. 1	E. J. Whitmire Stadium; Cullowhee, NC		W 42–24	7,114	
October 14		No. 5 Appalachian State^{†}	No. 1	Paulson Stadium; Statesboro, GA		W 34–28	21,899	
October 21	3:30 pm	at The Citadel	No. 1	Johnson Hagood Stadium; Charleston, SC	FSNS	W 27–10	12,391	
October 28		East Tennessee State	No. 1	Paulson Stadium; Statesboro, GA		W 42–7	17,008	
November 4		at No. 11 Furman	No. 1	Paladin Stadium; Greensville, SC		L 10–45	15,127	
November 11		Elon*	No. 6	Paulson Stadium; Statesboro, GA		W 32–9	14,084	
November 25		No. 16 McNeese State*	No. 5	Paulson Stadium; Statesboro, GA (NCAA Division I-AA First Round)		W 42–17	5,350	
December 2		No. 12 Hofstra*	No. 5	Paulson Stadium; Statesboro, GA (NCAA Division I-AA Quarterfinal)	Metro TV	W 48–20	7,139	
December 9	12:00 pm	at No. 2 Delaware*	No. 5	Delaware Stadium; Newark, DE (NCAA Division I-AA Semifinal)		W 27–18	15,035	
December 16	1:00 pm	vs. No. 1 Montana*	No. 5	Finley Stadium; Chattanooga, TN (NCAA Division I-AA Championship Game)	ESPN	W 27–25	17,156	
*Non-conference game; ^{†}Homecoming; Rankings from The Sports Network Poll released prior to the game; All times are in Eastern time
