= Larry Welsh =

American football coach (born c. 1941)

Biographical details
- Born: c. 1942 (age 83–84); Edgewood, California, U.S.
- Education: Northern Arizona University (1966)

Coaching career (HC unless noted)
- 1966: Northern Arizona (GA)
- 1966–1975: Gonzales HS (CA)
- 1976–1978: Cal State Fullerton (DC/LB)
- 1979–1996: Atascadero HS (CA)
- 1997–2000: Cal Poly

Head coaching record
- Overall: 19–25 (college); 259–56–9 (high school)

Larry Welsh (born c. 1942) is an American former college and high school football coach. He was the head football coach for Gonzales High School from 1966 to 1975, Atascadero High School from 1979 to 1996, and California Polytechnic State University, San Luis Obispo, from 1997 to 2000. He also coached for Northern Arizona and Cal State Fullerton.

== Head coaching record ==
=== College ===
Year	Team	Overall	Conference	Standing	Bowl/playoffs	TSN^{#}
Cal Poly Mustangs (NCAA Division I-AA independent) (1997–2000)
1997	Cal Poly	10–1				18
1998	Cal Poly	3–8				
1999	Cal Poly	3–8				
2000	Cal Poly	3–8				
Cal Poly:		19–25				
Total:		19–25				
