= 2000 Davidson Wildcats football team =

American college football season

2000 Davidson Wildcats football
- Conference: Independent
- Record: 10–0
- Head coach: Joe Susan (1st season)
- Home stadium: Richardson Stadium

2000 NCAA Division I-AA independents football standings
	Conf.			Overall
Team	W		L	W		L
Davidson		–		10	–	0
No. 7 Hofstra ^		–		9	–	4
Southern Utah		–		7	–	4
South Florida		–		7	–	4
Elon		–		7	–	4
Morehead State		–		6	–	3
Saint Mary's		–		6	–	5
Charleston Southern		–		5	–	6
Jacksonville		–		3	–	8
Samford		–		4	–	7
Cal Poly		–		3	–	8
Liberty		–		3	–	8
Austin Peay		–		2	–	9
^ – NCAA Division I-AA playoff participant; Rankings from The Sports Network poll

The 2000 Davidson Wildcats football team represented Davidson College as an independent during the 2000 NCAA Division I-AA football season. It was the program's 102nd season overall but their first with an undefeated record. Davidson was led by first-year head coach Joe Susan, who was named the FCS Mid-Major Coach of the Year.

== Schedule ==
Date	Time	Opponent	Site	Result	Attendance	Source
September 9	1:30 p.m.	Jacksonville	Richardson Stadium; Davidson, NC	W 36–7	2,048	
September 16	1:30 p.m.	at Sewanee	McGee Field; Sewanee, TN	W 14–0	900 (Note: According to the 2000 Davidson statistics sheet, a total of 8,405 spectators attended the four away games. 7,505 combined spectators attended the away games not including Sewanee.)	
September 23	2:00 p.m.	Emory and Henry^{†}	Richardson Stadium; Davidson, NC	W 17–14	3,549	
October 7		Morehead State	Richardson Stadium; Davidson, NC	W 38–31 ^{2OT}	2,032	
October 14		at San Diego	Torero Stadium; San Diego, CA	W 27–13	3,377	
October 21	1:30 p.m.	Randolph–Macon	Richardson Stadium; Davidson, NC	W 20–12	4,123	
October 28		at Hampden–Sydney	Hundley Stadium; Hampden Sydney, VA	W 36–17	2,528	
November 4		Centre	Richardson Stadium; Davidson, NC	W 20–17	2,127	
November 11		at Austin Peay	Fortera Stadium; Clarksville, TN	W 22–7	1,600	
November 18		Georgetown	Richardson Stadium; Davidson, NC	W 41–17	4,200	
^{†}Homecoming; All times are in Eastern time

== Awards and honors ==
- FCS Mid-Major All-America First Team – Ryan Crawford (The Football Gazette); Bryan Fish (The Football Gazette); Bo Henderson (The Football Gazette)
- FCS Mid-Major All-America Second Team – Corey Crawford (The Football Gazette)
- FCS Mid-Major Defensive Back of the Year – Ryan Crawford (The Football Gazette)
- FCS Independent Defensive MVP – Ryan Crawford
- FCS Mid-Major Coach of the Year – Joe Susan (The Football Gazette)
- FCS Independent Coach of the Year – Joe Susan
