= 2000 Liberty Flames football team =

American college football season

2000 Liberty Flames football
- Conference: Independent
- Record: 3–8
- Head coach: Ken Karcher (1st season)
- Home stadium: Williams Stadium

2000 NCAA Division I-AA independents football standings
	Conf.			Overall
Team	W		L	W		L
Davidson		–		10	–	0
No. 7 Hofstra ^		–		9	–	4
Southern Utah		–		7	–	4
South Florida		–		7	–	4
Elon		–		7	–	4
Morehead State		–		6	–	3
Saint Mary's		–		6	–	5
Charleston Southern		–		5	–	6
Jacksonville		–		3	–	8
Samford		–		4	–	7
Cal Poly		–		3	–	8
Liberty		–		3	–	8
Austin Peay		–		2	–	9
^ – NCAA Division I-AA playoff participant; Rankings from The Sports Network poll

The 2000 Liberty Flames football team represented Liberty University as an independent during the 2000 NCAA Division I-AA football season. Under the guidance of first-year head coach Ken Karcher, the Flames achieved a record of 3–8. Home games were played at Williams Stadium in Lynchburg, Virginia.

== Schedule ==
Date	Time	Opponent	Site	TV	Result	Attendance	Source
September 2	7:00 p.m.	East Tennessee State*	Williams Stadium; Lynchburg, VA		L 20–37	6,279	
September 9	6:00 p.m.	at No. 14 James Madison*	Bridgeforth Stadium; Harrisonburg, VA		L 7–38	10,000	
September 16	7:00 p.m.	Gardner–Webb*	Williams Stadium; Lynchburg, VA		W 19–8	9,877	
September 23	1:00 p.m.	at Delaware State*	Alumni Stadium; Dover, DE		L 25–42	1,710	
September 30		Wingate*^{†}	Williams Stadium; Lynchburg, VA		W 50–26	11,377	
October 13		at No. 13 Hofstra*	James M. Shuart Stadium; Hempstead, NY		L 14–42	4,354	
October 21	7:00 p.m.	at South Florida*	Raymond James Stadium; Tampa, FL	FSNF	L 6–44	25,161	
October 28	1:30 p.m.	Samford*	Williams Stadium; Lynchburg, VA		W 24–0	5,813	
November 4		at Elon*	Burlington Memorial Stadium; Elon, NC		L 17–24	7,653 (Note: According to the 2000 Liberty statistics sheet, a total of 55,409 spectators attended the six away games. 47,756 combined spectators attended the away games not including Elon.)	
November 11	1:30 p.m.	Charleston Southern*	Williams Stadium; Lynchburg, VA		L 0–25	3,237	
November 18		at No. 10 Appalachian State*	Kidd Brewer Stadium; Boone, NC		L 13–34	6,531	
*Non-conference game; ^{†}Homecoming; Rankings from The Sports Network Poll released prior to the game; All times are in Eastern time
