= 2000 South Florida Bulls football team =

American college football season

2000 South Florida Bulls football
- Conference: Independent
- Record: 7–4
- Head coach: Jim Leavitt (4th season)
- Offensive coordinator: Mike Canales (4th season)
- Offensive scheme: Pro-style
- Defensive coordinator: Rick Kravitz (4th season)
- Base defense: 3–4
- Home stadium: Raymond James Stadium

2000 NCAA Division I-AA independents football standings
| | Conf. | | | Overall |
| Team | W | | L | W | | L |
|---|---|---|---|---|---|---|
| Davidson | | – | | 10 | – | 0 |
| No. 7 Hofstra ^ | | – | | 9 | – | 4 |
| Southern Utah | | – | | 7 | – | 4 |
| South Florida | | – | | 7 | – | 4 |
| Elon | | – | | 7 | – | 4 |
| Morehead State | | – | | 6 | – | 3 |
| Saint Mary's | | – | | 6 | – | 5 |
| Charleston Southern | | – | | 5 | – | 6 |
| Jacksonville | | – | | 3 | – | 8 |
| Samford | | – | | 4 | – | 7 |
| Cal Poly | | – | | 3 | – | 8 |
| Liberty | | – | | 3 | – | 8 |
| Austin Peay | | – | | 2 | – | 9 |
^ – NCAA Division I-AA playoff participant; Rankings from The Sports Network poll

The 2000 South Florida Bulls football team represented the University of South Florida (USF) as an independent during the 2000 NCAA Division I-AA football season. Led by fourth-year head coach Jim Leavitt, the Bulls compiled a record of 7–4. South Florida played home games at Raymond James Stadium in Tampa, Florida.

== Schedule ==
| Date | Time | Opponent | Site | TV | Result | Attendance | Source |
|---|---|---|---|---|---|---|---|
| September 2 | 7:00 p.m. | Jacksonville State | Raymond James Stadium; Tampa, FL | | W 40–0 | 30,043 | |
| September 9 | 1:30 p.m. | at Kentucky | Commonwealth Stadium; Lexington, KY | | L 9–27 | 63,821 | |
| September 16 | 7:00 p.m. | No. 13 James Madison | Raymond James Stadium; Tampa, FL | | W 26–7 | 23,002 | |
| September 23 | 7:00 p.m. | at Baylor | Floyd Casey Stadium; Waco, TX | | L 13–28 | 21,157 | |
| September 30 | 7:00 p.m. | No. 1 Troy State | Raymond James Stadium; Tampa, FL | WMOR | W 20–10 | 25,786 | |
| October 7 | 7:00 p.m. | at No. 18 (I-A) Southern Miss | M. M. Roberts Stadium; Hattiesburg, MS | FSNF | L 7–41 | 26,559 | |
| October 21 | 7:00 p.m. | Liberty | Raymond James Stadium; Tampa, FL | FSNF | W 44–6 | 25,161 | |
| October 28 | 1:30 p.m. | at Connecticut | Memorial Stadium; Storrs, CT | WMOR | W 21–13 | 16,585 | |
| November 4 | 7:00 p.m. | No. 6 Western Kentucky | Raymond James Stadium; Tampa, FL | | W 30–24 | 31,104 | |
| November 11 | 3:00 p.m. | at Middle Tennessee | Johnny "Red" Floyd Stadium; Murfreesboro, TN | FSNF | L 9–45 | 12,147 | |
| November 18 | 3:30 p.m. | Austin Peay | Raymond James Stadium; Tampa, FL | | W 59–0 | 23,390 | |
Rankings from The Sports Network Poll released prior to the game; All times are in Eastern time

== Roster ==
2000 South Florida Bulls football team roster
Players
Coaches
Offense

| Pos. | # | Name | Class |
|---|---|---|---|
| WR | 4 | DeAndrew Rubin | So |

Defense

| Pos. | # | Name | Class |
|---|---|---|---|
| DB | 12 | Anthony Henry | Sr |
| LB | 5 | Kawika Mitchell | So |
| DE | 41 | Shurron Pierson | So |
| DB | 32 | J. R. Reed | Fr |

Special teams

| Pos. | # | Name | Class |
|---|---|---|---|
| K | 7 | Bill Gramatica | Sr |

Head coach

- Jim Leavitt

Coordinators/assistant coaches

Legend

- (C) Team captain
- (S) Suspended
- (I) Ineligible
- Injured
- Redshirt

Roster

== After the season ==
=== NFL draft ===
The following Bulls were selected in the National Football League draft following the season.

| Round | Pick | Player | Position | NFL club |
|---|---|---|---|---|
| 4 | 96 | Kenyatta Jones | Defensive tackle | New England Patriots |
| 4 | 97 | Anthony Henry | Defensive back | Cleveland Browns |
| 4 | 98 | Bill Gramatica | Kicker | Arizona Cardinals |
