= Butchie (disambiguation) =

Butchie is a fictional character on the HBO drama series The Wire. Butchie may also refer to:

- Butchie's Drive-In, restaurant
- The Butchies, punk rock band
- Butchie Washington (born 1977), American football player
- Arthur "Butchy" Doe Jr., Irish-American mobster
