= Butch =

Butch may refer to:

== People ==
- Butch (nickname), a list of people
- Barbara Butch, French lesbian DJ and activist
- Butch Patrick, American child actor Patrick Alan Lilley (born 1953), best known for his role as Eddie Munster in The Munsters
- Butch Miller (wrestler) and Butch Doink, ring names of New Zealand professional wrestler Robert "Bob" Miller (1944–2023)
- Butch, a ring name of British professional wrestler Pete Dunne (born 1993)

== Animals ==
- Butch, the second oldest (verified) dog ever, age 28
- Butch, one of the Tamworth Two, two pigs that escaped from an abattoir and caused a media frenzy in England

== Fictional characters ==
- Butch, the black haired member of The Rowdyruff Boys, a trio of the Powerpuff Girls' male versions in the animated series The Powerpuff Girls
- Butch, a minor antagonist in the Pokémon anime series
- Butch the Bulldog, nemesis of Pluto in Walt Disney cartoons
- Butch Cat, a black cat in the Tom and Jerry cartoons
- Butch, the Tyrannosaurus Rex from the 2015 Disney/Pixar film The Good Dinosaur
- Tommy Bond, an Our Gang character nicknamed Butch
- Butch Cassidy, one of the main characters of Butch Cassidy and the Sundance Kid, a 1969 American Western film
- Butch Coolidge, in the film Pulp Fiction
- Butch DeLoria, in the video game Fallout 3
- Butch DeConcini, a character from The Sopranos

== Sexuality ==
- Butch (lesbian slang), refers to a masculine lesbian and masculine lesbian culture
  - Butch and femme, gender identity terms for butch lesbians and feminine lesbians
- Butch (gay slang), a hypermasculine man

== Other uses ==
- Butch (album), by The Geraldine Fibbers
- Butch cut, a type of haircut

== See also ==
- Butchie
- Butchie's Drive-In
- The Butchies
