= 2000 Akron Zips football team =

American college football season

2000 Akron Zips football

MAC East Division co-champion
- Conference: Mid-American Conference
- East Division
- Record: 6–5 (5–3 MAC)
- Head coach: Lee Owens (6th season)
- Offensive coordinator: Paul Winters (6th season)
- Defensive coordinator: Joe Palmisano (3rd season)
- Captains: Tony McCray; Rich Reliford; Dwight Smith; Butchie Washington
- Home stadium: Rubber Bowl

2000 Mid-American Conference football standings
	Div			Conf.			Overall
Team	W		L	W		L	W		L
East Division
Marshall xy$	5	–	1	5	–	3	8	–	5
Akron x	5	–	1	5	–	3	6	–	5
Ohio	4	–	2	5	–	3	7	–	4
Miami (OH)	4	–	2	5	–	3	6	–	5
Bowling Green	1	–	5	2	–	6	2	–	9
Buffalo	2	–	4	2	–	6	2	–	9
Kent State	0	–	6	1	–	7	1	–	10
West Division
Western Michigan xy	4	–	1	7	–	1	9	–	3
Toledo x	4	–	1	6	–	1	10	–	1
Northern Illinois	2	–	3	4	–	3	6	–	5
Ball State	2	–	3	4	–	3	5	–	6
Eastern Michigan	2	–	3	2	–	5	3	–	8
Central Michigan	1	–	4	2	–	6	2	–	9
Championship: Marshall 19, Western Michigan 14
$ – Conference champion; x – Division champion/co-champions; y – Championship game participant; Due to an unbalanced conference schedule, the team with best division record within each division was awarded that division's championship game berth.

The 2000 Akron Zips football team represented Akron University in the 2000 NCAA Division I-A football season; they competed in the Mid-American Conference. They were led by sixth–year head coach Lee Owens. The Zips played their home games at the Rubber Bowl in Akron, Ohio. They outscored their opponents 333–295 and finished with a record of 6 wins and 5 losses (6–5).

== Schedule ==
Date	Opponent	Site	Result	Attendance	Source
September 2	at No. 11 Virginia Tech*	Lane Stadium; Blacksburg, VA	L 23–52	56,272	
September 9	at Central Michigan	Kelly/Shorts Stadium; Mount Pleasant, MI	L 7–17	18,438	
September 16	UCF*	Rubber Bowl; Akron, OH	W 35–24	12,964	
September 23	at Ohio	Peden Stadium; Athens, OH	W 23–20	20,114	
September 30	Miami (OH)	Rubber Bowl; Akron, OH	W 37–20	14,132	
October 7	at Bowling Green	Doyt Perry Stadium; Bowling Green, OH	W 27–21	8,008	
October 14	Northern Illinois	Rubber Bowl; Akron, OH	L 35–52	9,487	
October 21	Connecticut*	Rubber Bowl; Akron, OH	L 35–38	6,467	
October 28	Marshall	Rubber Bowl; Akron, OH	L 28–31	15,641	
November 11	Buffalo	Rubber Bowl; Akron, OH	W 49–14	5,132	
November 18	at Kent State	Dix Stadium; Kent, OH (Wagon Wheel)	W 34–6	5,270	
*Non-conference game; Rankings from AP Poll released prior to the game

== Roster ==
2000 Akron Zips football team roster
Players
Coaches
Offense

Pos.	#	Name	Class
WR	2	Matthew Cherry	Fr
QB	5	Charlie Frye	Fr

Defense

Pos.	#	Name	Class

Special teams

Pos.	#	Name	Class

Head coach

- Lee Owens

Coordinators/assistant coaches

Legend

- (C) Team captain
- (S) Suspended
- (I) Ineligible
- Injured
- Redshirt
