= 2000 Central Michigan Chippewas football team =

American college football season

2000 Central Michigan Chippewas football
- Conference: Mid-American Conference
- West Division
- Record: 2–9 (2–6 MAC)
- Head coach: Mike DeBord (1st season)
- MVP: Brian Leigeb
- Home stadium: Kelly/Shorts Stadium

2000 Mid-American Conference football standings
	Div			Conf.			Overall
Team	W		L	W		L	W		L
East Division
Marshall xy$	5	–	1	5	–	3	8	–	5
Akron x	5	–	1	5	–	3	6	–	5
Ohio	4	–	2	5	–	3	7	–	4
Miami (OH)	4	–	2	5	–	3	6	–	5
Bowling Green	1	–	5	2	–	6	2	–	9
Buffalo	2	–	4	2	–	6	2	–	9
Kent State	0	–	6	1	–	7	1	–	10
West Division
Western Michigan xy	4	–	1	7	–	1	9	–	3
Toledo x	4	–	1	6	–	1	10	–	1
Northern Illinois	2	–	3	4	–	3	6	–	5
Ball State	2	–	3	4	–	3	5	–	6
Eastern Michigan	2	–	3	2	–	5	3	–	8
Central Michigan	1	–	4	2	–	6	2	–	9
Championship: Marshall 19, Western Michigan 14
$ – Conference champion; x – Division champion/co-champions; y – Championship game participant; Due to an unbalanced conference schedule, the team with best division record within each division was awarded that division's championship game berth.

The 2000 Central Michigan Chippewas football team was an American football team that represented Central Michigan University in the Mid-American Conference (MAC) during the 2000 NCAA Division I-A football season. In their first season under head coach Mike DeBord, the Chippewas compiled a 2–9 record (2–6 against MAC opponents), finished in last place in the MAC's West Division, and were outscored by their opponents, 376 to 137. The team played its home games in Kelly/Shorts Stadium in Mount Pleasant, Michigan, with attendance of 94,949 in five home games. The team set a single season school record with 90 punts, and Brian Brandt set a school record with 87 punts.

The team's statistical leaders included Derrick Vickers with 1,059 passing yards, Vince Webber with 458 rushing yards, and David Hannah with 411 receiving yards. Senior defensive back Brian Leigeb set a single game school record with 26 tackles against Northern Illinois on November 18, 2000, totaled 147 tackles for the season, set a school record with 490 career tackles, and was selected as the team's most valuable player.

On December 1, 1999, Mike DeBord was hired as Central Michigan's head football coach. He had previously served as Michigan's offensive coordinator. DeBord was given a four-year contract with an annual base salary of $120,000.

== Schedule ==
Date	Opponent	Site	Result	Attendance	Source
September 2	at No. 15 Purdue*	Ross–Ade Stadium; West Lafayette, IN	L 0–48	56,197	
September 9	Akron	Kelly/Shorts Stadium; Mount Pleasant, MI	W 17–7	18,438	
September 16	at Wyoming*	War Memorial Stadium; Laramie, WY	L 10–31	19,050	
September 23	Boise State*	Kelly/Shorts Stadium; Mount Pleasant, MI	L 10–47	21,837	
September 30	at Toledo	Glass Bowl; Toledo, OH	L 0–41	20,913	
October 7	Kent State	Kelly/Shorts Stadium; Mount Pleasant, MI	L 21–24 ^{OT}	16,588	
October 21	at Ohio	Peden Stadium; Athens, OH	L 3–52	20,836	
October 28	Ball State	Kelly/Shorts Stadium; Mount Pleasant, MI	L 34–38	11,837	
November 4	at Eastern Michigan	Rynearson Stadium; Ypsilanti, MI (rivalry)	L 15–31	10,023	
November 11	Western Michigan	Kelly/Shorts Stadium; Mount Pleasant, MI (rivalry)	W 21–17	26,249	
November 18	at Northern Illinois	Huskie Stadium; DeKalb, IL	L 6–40	6,016	
*Non-conference game; Rankings from Coaches' Poll released prior to the game
