= 2000 Eastern Michigan Eagles football team =

American college football season

2000 Eastern Michigan Eagles football
- Conference: Mid-American Conference
- West Division
- Record: 3–8 (2–5 MAC)
- Head coach: Jeff Woodruff (1st season)
- Offensive coordinator: Pete Alamar (1st season)
- Defensive coordinator: William Harris (1st season)
- MVP: Walter Church
- Captains: Walter Church; Craig Cipa; Jason Short; Jeremaine Kyles; Clifton Robinson
- Home stadium: Rynearson Stadium

2000 Mid-American Conference football standings
	Div			Conf.			Overall
Team	W		L	W		L	W		L
East Division
Marshall xy$	5	–	1	5	–	3	8	–	5
Akron x	5	–	1	5	–	3	6	–	5
Ohio	4	–	2	5	–	3	7	–	4
Miami (OH)	4	–	2	5	–	3	6	–	5
Bowling Green	1	–	5	2	–	6	2	–	9
Buffalo	2	–	4	2	–	6	2	–	9
Kent State	0	–	6	1	–	7	1	–	10
West Division
Western Michigan xy	4	–	1	7	–	1	9	–	3
Toledo x	4	–	1	6	–	1	10	–	1
Northern Illinois	2	–	3	4	–	3	6	–	5
Ball State	2	–	3	4	–	3	5	–	6
Eastern Michigan	2	–	3	2	–	5	3	–	8
Central Michigan	1	–	4	2	–	6	2	–	9
Championship: Marshall 19, Western Michigan 14
$ – Conference champion; x – Division champion/co-champions; y – Championship game participant; Due to an unbalanced conference schedule, the team with best division record within each division was awarded that division's championship game berth.

The 2000 Eastern Michigan Eagles football team represented Eastern Michigan University in the 2000 NCAA Division I-A football season. In their first season under head coach Jeff Woodruff, the Eagles compiled a 3–8 record (2–5 against conference opponents), finished in fifth place in the West Division of the Mid-American Conference, and were outscored by their opponents, 350 to 209. The team's statistical leaders included Walter Church with 2,326 passing yards, John White with 561 rushing yards, and Kenny Christian with 808 receiving yards. Walter Church received the team's most valuable player award.

== Schedule ==
Date	Time	Opponent	Site	TV	Result	Attendance	Source
September 2	7:00 p.m.	Connecticut*	Rynearson Stadium; Ypsilanti, MI	CPTV	W 32-25	11,148	
September 9	1:00 p.m.	Miami (OH)	Rynearson Stadium; Ypsilanti, MI		L 17-34	10,023	
September 16	7:00 p.m.	at South Carolina*	Williams–Brice Stadium; Columbia, SC		L 6-41	80,922	
September 23	6:00 p.m.	at Temple*	Franklin Field; Philadelphia, PA		L 40-49	13,853	
September 30	1:00 p.m.	UCF*	Rynearson Stadium; Ypsilanti, MI		L 10-31	10,238	
October 7	4:00 p.m.	Toledo	Rynearson Stadium; Ypsilanti, MI		L 14-42	14,139	
October 14	1:00 p.m.	at Ball State	Scheumann Stadium; Muncie, IN		L 14-33	17,899	
October 21	7:00 p.m.	at Bowling Green	Doyt Perry Stadium; Bowling Green, OH		L 6-20	8,042	
November 4	1:00 p.m.	Central Michigan	Rynearson Stadium; Ypsilanti, MI (rivalry)		W 31-15	10,023	
November 11	1:00 p.m.	Northern Illinois	Rynearson Stadium; Ypsilanti, MI		W 39-32	4,592	
November 18	1:05 p.m.	at Western Michigan	Waldo Stadium; Kalamazoo, MI		L 0-28	15,102	
*Non-conference game; All times are in Eastern time

== Roster ==
2000 Eastern Michigan Eagles football team roster
Players
Coaches
Offense

Pos.	#	Name	Class
RB/DB	2	Ryan Clifford	Fr
WR	3	Jamal Stevens	Jr
WR	7	Kenny Christian	Jr
WR	9	Keijuan Douglas	Sr
QB	10	Chinedu Okoro	Fr
WR/DB	13	Ashantti Watson	Fr
QB	14	Collin Carey	Fr
WR	15	Alonzo Harris	Fr
QB	16	Troy Edwards	So
QB	17	Rick Pyle	Fr
WR	18	Adrian Barbera	Sr
QB/DB	18	Kevin Harrison	Fr
QB	19	Walter Church	Sr
TB	21	Rich Schutt	So
TB	23	Dale McGhee	So
WR/DB	28	Jeff Brown	Fr
TB	31	Idris Wells	Sr
TB/SS	32	Mike Mangan	Fr
TE	33	Mike Luna	Sr
WR	33	James Stanford	Fr
TB	34	John White	Jr
TE	36	Matt Kelly	Sr
TB	40	Eric Powell	Jr
TE/DE	41	Braden Feucht	Fr
TB	45	Chris Whittington	So
TB/DB	48	Ryan King	Fr
OL	62	Craig Cipa	Sr
OL	63/69	Damian Tilley	Jr
OL	64	Rich Chorak	Jr
OL	66	Luis Garcia	Sr
OL	67	Michael Johnson	Fr
OL	68	Chuck Butkowski	Jr
OL	70	Nick Suszan	Fr
OL	71	Woodrow Young	So
OL	72	Chris Sartori	Fr
C	73	Cory Annett	Jr
OL	74	Kristofer Stark	Jr
OL	75	Izaak Madril	Jr
OL	77	John Grabowski	Jr
WR	81	Kevin Walter	So
TE	82	Kevin Zureki	Fr
WR	84	Larry Clark	So
TE	85	Adam Jarosz	Fr
TE/DE	86	Sam Anderson	Fr
WR	88	Vince Nasca	So
TE	89	Brett Wells	So
TE	97	Justin Berent	Fr

Defense

Pos.	#	Name	Class
DB	1	Emmanuel Sneed	Jr
DB	4	Maurice Ryland	Jr
DB	5	Andrae Brooks	Jr
DB	6	Rickey Scott	Sr
LB	8	Clifton Robinson	Sr
DB	11	London Lindsey	Jr
DB	9	Az Love	Fr
DB	23	Jelani Johnson	Sr
DB	25	David Huff	Fr
DB	26	Terrance Dills	So
DB	27	Ryan Pratt	So
DB	29	Erick Middleton	So
DB	35	James Willingham	Sr
DB/TB	37	Nate Brooks	Fr
LB	37	Ernie Scalzi	So
LB	37	Mike Salvatori	Fr
DB	38	Antonio Liddell	So
LB	39	Jason Short	Sr
FS	43	Josh Martin	Fr
LB	44	Scott Russell	Jr
LB	46	Fred Bateman	So
LB	49	Jeff Altoft	So
LB/FB	51	Ryan Robinette	Fr
LB	52	Chris Roberson	So
LB	53	David Martin	So
LB	54	David Lusky	Fr
LB/DE	55	Brian Jenkins	Fr
RE	56	Elliott Daniels	So
LB	57	Cody Lettiere	Fr
DE/OT	59	Dan Davis	Fr
DL	90	Anthony Bailey	Jr
DL	91	Hammond Russell	So
LE	92	Nik Buckmeier	Jr
DL	93	Jari Brown	Jr
DL	95	Jeremaine Kyles	Sr
DE	96	Antone Hines	Jr
DE	98	Jonas Jackson	Jr
DE	99	James Turner	Sr

Special teams

Pos.	#	Name	Class
K	12	Toller Starnes	Jr
PNT	20	Nick Avondet	Sr
PNT/TE	20	Colin Wilshire	Fr
LS	87	Carson Dach	So
PNT	98	David Rysco	So

Head coach

- Jeff Woodruff

Coordinators/assistant coaches

- William Harris
- Pete Alamar
- Mark Woodson
- Scott Schroeder
- Kerry Locklin
- Tony Lombardi

Legend

- (C) Team captain
- (S) Suspended
- (I) Ineligible
- Injured
- Redshirt

== Conference awards and leaders ==
=== Walter Church ===
- 238 Pass Completions (2nd)
- 399 Pass Attempts (2nd)
- 59.6 Pass Completion Percentage (3rd)
- 2,326 Passing Yards (4th)

=== Kenny Christian ===
- 78 Receptions (1st)
- Second Team All-MAC Offense

=== Kevin Walter ===
- 5 Receiving Touchdowns (Tied 4th)
- 426 Total Plays (Tied 3rd)
- 2,236 Total Yards (5th)

=== Toller Starnes ===
- 11 Field Goals Made (Tied 4th)
- 78.6 Field Goal Percentage (3rd)

=== Nick Avondet ===
- 71 Punts (3rd)
- 2,954 Punting Yards (2nd)
- 41.6 Punting Yards Per Punt (3rd)
- Second Team All-MAC Defense
