= 2000 MAC Championship Game =

- Conference Championship
Western Michigan Broncos	Marshall Thundering Herd
(9–2)	(6–5)
14	19
Head coach: Gary Darnell	Head coach: Bob Pruett
	1	2	3	4	Total
Western Michigan	0	0	7	7	14
Marshall	3	10	0	6	19
- Date: December 2, 2000
- Season: 2000
- Stadium: Marshall Stadium
- Location: Huntington, West Virginia
- MVP: QB Byron Leftwich (Marshall)
- Favorite: WMU by 6.5
- Attendance: 24,816

United States TV coverage
- Network: ABC
- Announcers: Sean McDonough, Ed Cunningham, Leslie Gudel

2000 Mid-American Conference football standings
	Div			Conf.			Overall
Team	W		L	W		L	W		L
East Division
Marshall xy$	5	–	1	5	–	3	8	–	5
Akron x	5	–	1	5	–	3	6	–	5
Ohio	4	–	2	5	–	3	7	–	4
Miami (OH)	4	–	2	5	–	3	6	–	5
Bowling Green	1	–	5	2	–	6	2	–	9
Buffalo	2	–	4	2	–	6	2	–	9
Kent State	0	–	6	1	–	7	1	–	10
West Division
Western Michigan xy	4	–	1	7	–	1	9	–	3
Toledo x	4	–	1	6	–	1	10	–	1
Northern Illinois	2	–	3	4	–	3	6	–	5
Ball State	2	–	3	4	–	3	5	–	6
Eastern Michigan	2	–	3	2	–	5	3	–	8
Central Michigan	1	–	4	2	–	6	2	–	9
Championship: Marshall 19, Western Michigan 14
$ – Conference champion; x – Division champion/co-champions; y – Championship game participant; Due to an unbalanced conference schedule, the team with best division record within each division was awarded that division's championship game berth.

The 2000 MAC Championship Game was played on December 2, 2000 at Marshall Stadium, now known as Joan C. Edwards Stadium, in Huntington, West Virginia. The game featured the winner of each division of the Mid-American Conference. The game featured the Marshall Thundering Herd, of the East Division, and the Western Michigan Broncos, of the West Division. The Thundering Herd beat the Broncos 19−14.
