= 2000 Western Michigan Broncos football team =

American college football season

2000 Western Michigan Broncos football

MAC West Division co-champion

MAC Championship Game, L 19–14 vs. Marshall
- Conference: Mid-American Conference
- West Division
- Record: 9–3 (7–1 MAC)
- Head coach: Gary Darnell (4th season)
- Offensive coordinator: Brian Rock (1st season)
- Defensive coordinator: Chuck Driesbach (4th season)
- MVP: Garrett Soldano
- Home stadium: Waldo Stadium

2000 Mid-American Conference football standings
	Div			Conf.			Overall
Team	W		L	W		L	W		L
East Division
Marshall xy$	5	–	1	5	–	3	8	–	5
Akron x	5	–	1	5	–	3	6	–	5
Ohio	4	–	2	5	–	3	7	–	4
Miami (OH)	4	–	2	5	–	3	6	–	5
Bowling Green	1	–	5	2	–	6	2	–	9
Buffalo	2	–	4	2	–	6	2	–	9
Kent State	0	–	6	1	–	7	1	–	10
West Division
Western Michigan xy	4	–	1	7	–	1	9	–	3
Toledo x	4	–	1	6	–	1	10	–	1
Northern Illinois	2	–	3	4	–	3	6	–	5
Ball State	2	–	3	4	–	3	5	–	6
Eastern Michigan	2	–	3	2	–	5	3	–	8
Central Michigan	1	–	4	2	–	6	2	–	9
Championship: Marshall 19, Western Michigan 14
$ – Conference champion; x – Division champion/co-champions; y – Championship game participant; Due to an unbalanced conference schedule, the team with best division record within each division was awarded that division's championship game berth.

The 2000 Western Michigan Broncos football team was an American football team that represented Western Michigan University during the 2000 NCAA Division I-A football season. In their fourth season under head coach Gary Darnell, the team compiled a 9–3 record, finished in a tie for first place in the West Division of the Mid-American Conference (MAC), and lost to the Marshall Thundering Herd in the 2000 MAC Championship Game. The team played its home games at Waldo Stadium in Kalamazoo, Michigan.

The team's statistical leaders were Jeff Welsh with 2,537 passing yards, Robert Sanford with 1,571 rushing yards, and Steve Neal with 67 catches for 848 receiving yards. Sanford was selected as the MAC's most valuable player and the offensive player of the year. Gary Darnell was named the MAC coach of the year.

== Schedule ==
Date	Time	Opponent	Site	TV	Result	Attendance	Source
August 31	8:00 pm	at No. 4 Wisconsin*	Camp Randall Stadium; Madison, WI	ESPN Regional	L 7–19	77,843	
September 9	2:00 pm	at Iowa*	Kinnick Stadium; Iowa City, IA		W 27–21	55,650	
September 16	6:05 pm	Indiana State*	Waldo Stadium; Kalamazoo, MI		W 56–0	36,361	
September 23	6:00 pm	Toledo	Waldo Stadium; Kalamazoo, MI		W 21–14	24,816	
September 30	1:00 pm	Ohio	Waldo Stadium; Kalamazoo, MI		W 23–10	21,412	
October 5	8:00 pm	at Marshall	Marshall University Stadium; Huntington, WV	ESPN	W 30–10	27,109	
October 21	1:00 pm	Northern Illinois^{†}	Waldo Stadium; Kalamazoo, MI	ESPN Regional	W 52–22	27,523	
October 28	2:00 pm	at Kent State	Dix Stadium; Kent, OH		W 42–0	3,586	
November 4	1:00 pm	at Ball State	Scheumann Stadium; Muncie, IN		W 42–3	18,535	
November 11	1:00 pm	at Central Michigan	Kelly/Shorts Stadium; Mount Pleasant, MI (rivalry)	ESPN Plus	L 17–21	26,249	
November 18	1:05 pm	Eastern Michigan	Waldo Stadium; Kalamazoo, MI		W 28–0	15,102	
December 2	1:00 pm	at Marshall	Marshall University Stadium; Huntington, WV (MAC Championship)	ABC	L 14–19	24,816	
*Non-conference game; ^{†}Homecoming; Rankings from AP Poll released prior to the game; All times are in Eastern time

== Roster ==
2000 Western Michigan Broncos football team roster
Players
Coaches
Offense

Pos.	#	Name	Class
WR	1	Steve Neal	Sr
WR	9	Micah Zuhl	Jr
WR	15	Corey Alston	Sr

Defense

Pos.	#	Name	Class

Special teams

Pos.	#	Name	Class

Head coach

- Gary Darnell

Coordinators/assistant coaches

- Dan Enos (Quarterbacks)

Legend

- (C) Team captain
- (S) Suspended
- (I) Ineligible
- Injured
- Redshirt

Roster
