= 2000 Buffalo Bulls football team =

American college football season

2000 Buffalo Bulls football
- Conference: Mid-American Conference
- East Division
- Record: 2–9 (2–6 MAC)
- Head coach: Craig Cirbus (6th season)
- Defensive coordinator: Joe Reich (4th season)
- Captains: Brandon Shaughnessy; Gabe Kogler; Tory Smith; Chris Gray; Marcus Cole
- Home stadium: University at Buffalo Stadium

2000 Mid-American Conference football standings
| | Div | | | Conf. | | | Overall |
| Team | W | | L | W | | L | W | | L |
|---|---|---|---|---|---|---|---|---|---|
East Division
| Marshall xy$ | 5 | – | 1 | 5 | – | 3 | 8 | – | 5 |
| Akron x | 5 | – | 1 | 5 | – | 3 | 6 | – | 5 |
| Ohio | 4 | – | 2 | 5 | – | 3 | 7 | – | 4 |
| Miami (OH) | 4 | – | 2 | 5 | – | 3 | 6 | – | 5 |
| Bowling Green | 1 | – | 5 | 2 | – | 6 | 2 | – | 9 |
| Buffalo | 2 | – | 4 | 2 | – | 6 | 2 | – | 9 |
| Kent State | 0 | – | 6 | 1 | – | 7 | 1 | – | 10 |
West Division
| Western Michigan xy | 4 | – | 1 | 7 | – | 1 | 9 | – | 3 |
| Toledo x | 4 | – | 1 | 6 | – | 1 | 10 | – | 1 |
| Northern Illinois | 2 | – | 3 | 4 | – | 3 | 6 | – | 5 |
| Ball State | 2 | – | 3 | 4 | – | 3 | 5 | – | 6 |
| Eastern Michigan | 2 | – | 3 | 2 | – | 5 | 3 | – | 8 |
| Central Michigan | 1 | – | 4 | 2 | – | 6 | 2 | – | 9 |
Championship: Marshall 19, Western Michigan 14
$ – Conference champion; x – Division champion/co-champions; y – Championship game participant; Due to an unbalanced conference schedule, the team with best division record within each division was awarded that division's championship game berth.

The 2000 Buffalo Bulls football team represented the University at Buffalo as a member of the Mid-American Conference (MAC) during the 2000 NCAA Division I-AA football season. Led by Craig Cirbus in his sixth and final season as head coach, the Bulls compiled an overall record of 2–9 with a mark of 2–6 in conference play, tying for fifth place in the MAC's East Division. The team played home games at the University at Buffalo Stadium in Amherst, New York.

== Schedule ==
| Date | Time | Opponent | Site | TV | Result | Attendance |
|---|---|---|---|---|---|---|
| September 2 | 7:00 pm | at Syracuse* | Carrier Dome; Syracuse, NY | | L 7–63 | 40,634 |
| September 9 | 6:00 pm | at Rutgers* | Rutgers Stadium; Piscataway, NJ | | L 0–59 | 26,511 |
| September 16 | 7:00 pm | Connecticut* | University at Buffalo Stadium; Amherst, NY | | L 21–24 | 13,678 |
| September 23 | 7:00 pm | Bowling Green | University at Buffalo Stadium; Amherst, NY | | W 20–17 | 8,081 |
| September 30 | 7:00 pm | at Marshall | Marshall University Stadium; Huntington, WV | ESN | L 14–47 | 29,089 |
| October 7 | 7:00 pm | at Ohio | Peden Stadium; Athens, OH | | L 20–42 | 17,634 |
| October 21 | 1:00 pm | Ball State | University at Buffalo Stadium; Amherst, NY | | L 35–44 | 13,064 |
| October 28 | 1:00 pm | at Northern Illinois | Huskie Stadium; DeKalb, IL | ESPN Plus | L 10–73 | 16,586 |
| November 4 | 1:00 pm | Kent State | University at Buffalo Stadium; Amherst, NY | | W 20–17 ^{OT} | 7,131 |
| November 11 | 7:00 pm | at Akron | Rubber Bowl; Akron, OH | | L 14–49 | 5,132 |
| November 18 | 1:00 pm | Miami (OH) | University at Buffalo Stadium; Amherst, NY | | L 16–17 | 26,511 |
*Non-conference game; All times are in Eastern time

== Roster ==
2000 Buffalo Bulls football team roster
Players
Coaches
Offense

| Pos. | # | Name | Class |
|---|---|---|---|
| QB | 14 | Adam Johnson | So |
| QB | 15 | Joe Freedy | Jr |
| OL | 71 | Brian Johnessee | Jr |
| OL | 72 | Dan Minocchi | Fr |
| OL | 73 | Josh Stello | Sr |
| OL | 74 | David Pruce | Sr |
| OL | 75 | Erik Zeppuhar | Fr |
| OL | 77 | William Paris | Fr |
| WR | 81 | Andre Forde | So |
| WR | 82 | Dan Lindsay | So |
| TE | 84 | Chad Bartoszek | So |

Defense

| Pos. | # | Name | Class |
|---|---|---|---|
| DB | 29 | J. J. Gibson | Fr |
| DB | 30 | Mark Quinn | So |
| LB | 39 | Ryan Buttles | So |
| LB | 49 | Marcus Gray | Sr |
| LB | 59 | Marcus Cole | Sr |
| DB | 40 | Terek Henderson | Fr |
| DL | 78 | Ron Gannello | Jr |
| DL | 79 | Lorenzo Jones | Fr |
| DE | 90 | Steve Fleming | So |
| DT | 91 | Omari Jordan | Jr |
| LB | 92 | Brian Pons | Jr |

Special teams

| Pos. | # | Name | Class |

Head coach

- Craig Cirbus

Coordinators/assistant coaches

Legend

- (C) Team captain
- (S) Suspended
- (I) Ineligible
- Injured
- Redshirt

Roster
Last update: 2001-07-22
