= 2000 Marshall Thundering Herd football team =

American college football season

2000 Marshall Thundering Herd football

MAC champion MAC East Division co-champion Motor City Bowl champion

MAC Championship Game, W 19–14 vs. Western Michigan

Motor City Bowl, W 25–14 vs. Cincinnati
- Conference: Mid-American Conference
- East Division
- Record: 8–5 (5–3 MAC)
- Head coach: Bob Pruett (5th season)
- Offensive coordinator: Ed Zaunbrecher (1st season)
- Offensive scheme: Spread
- Defensive coordinator: Kevin Kelly (4th season)
- Base defense: 3–4

2000 Mid-American Conference football standings
	Div			Conf.			Overall
Team	W		L	W		L	W		L
East Division
Marshall xy$	5	–	1	5	–	3	8	–	5
Akron x	5	–	1	5	–	3	6	–	5
Ohio	4	–	2	5	–	3	7	–	4
Miami (OH)	4	–	2	5	–	3	6	–	5
Bowling Green	1	–	5	2	–	6	2	–	9
Buffalo	2	–	4	2	–	6	2	–	9
Kent State	0	–	6	1	–	7	1	–	10
West Division
Western Michigan xy	4	–	1	7	–	1	9	–	3
Toledo x	4	–	1	6	–	1	10	–	1
Northern Illinois	2	–	3	4	–	3	6	–	5
Ball State	2	–	3	4	–	3	5	–	6
Eastern Michigan	2	–	3	2	–	5	3	–	8
Central Michigan	1	–	4	2	–	6	2	–	9
Championship: Marshall 19, Western Michigan 14
$ – Conference champion; x – Division champion/co-champions; y – Championship game participant; Due to an unbalanced conference schedule, the team with best division record within each division was awarded that division's championship game berth.

The 2000 Marshall Thundering Herd football team represented Marshall University in 2000 NCAA Division I-A football season. The Thundering Herd played their home games at Marshall University Stadium in Huntington, West Virginia, and competed in the East Division of the Mid-American Conference (MAC). The team was coached by fifth-year head coach Bob Pruett. Marshall won its fourth consecutive MAC championship.

== Schedule ==
Date	Time	Opponent	Site	TV	Result	Attendance
August 31	7:00 pm	SE Missouri State*	Marshall University Stadium; Huntington, WV		W 63–7	30,225
September 9	12:00 pm	at No. 24 Michigan State*	Spartan Stadium; East Lansing, MI	ESPN	L 24–34	72,983
September 23	6:00 pm	at North Carolina*	Kenan Memorial Stadium; Chapel Hill, NC		L 15–20	53,000
September 30	7:00 pm	Buffalo	Marshall University Stadium; Huntington, WV		W 47–14	29,089
October 5	8:00 pm	Western Michigan	Marshall University Stadium; Huntington, WV	ESPN	L 10–30	27,109
October 14	7:00 pm	at Toledo	Glass Bowl; Toledo, OH	ESPN+	L 0–42	34,900
October 21	3:30 pm	Kent State^{†}	Marshall University Stadium; Huntington, WV		W 34–12	25,646
October 28	7:00 pm	at Akron	Rubber Bowl; Akron, OH		W 31–28	15,641
November 4	1:30 pm	at Bowling Green	Doyt Perry Stadium; Bowling Green, OH		W 20–13	8,091
November 11	7:00 pm	Miami (OH)	Marshall University Stadium; Huntington, WV		W 51–31	30,419
November 18	4:00 pm	at Ohio	Peden Stadium; Athens, OH (Battle for the Bell)		L 28–38	21,217
December 2	1:00 pm	Western Michigan	Marshall University Stadium; Huntington, WV (MAC Championship)	ABC	W 19–14	24,816
December 27	4:00 pm	vs. Cincinnati*	Silverdome; Pontiac, MI (Motor City Bowl)	ESPN2	W 25–14	52,911
*Non-conference game; ^{†}Homecoming; Rankings from AP Poll released prior to the game; All times are in Eastern time

== Roster ==
2000 Marshall Thundering Herd football team roster
Players
Coaches
Offense

Pos.	#	Name	Class
WR	6	John Cooper	Sr
QB	7	Byron Leftwich	So
WR	3	Nate Poole	Sr
G	75	Steve Sciullo	So
WR	40	Darius Watts	Fr

Defense

Pos.	#	Name	Class
FS	19	Chris Crocker	So
DB	15	Yancey Satterwhite	So
DE	85	Paul Toviessi	Sr
LB	5	Max Yates	Jr

Special teams

Pos.	#	Name	Class
K	43	J. R. Jenkins	Sr
LS	54	Chris Massey	Jr

Head coach

- Bob Pruett

Coordinators/assistant coaches

Legend

- (C) Team captain
- (S) Suspended
- (I) Ineligible
- Injured
- Redshirt

Roster
Last update: 2000-11-09

== Team players in the NFL ==
Player	Position	Round	Pick	NFL club
Paul Toviessi	Defensive End	2	51	Denver Broncos
