= Craig Cirbus =

American football player and coach

Playing career
- 1977–1979: Buffalo

Coaching career (HC unless noted)
- 1984–1994: Penn State (assistant)
- 1995–2000: Buffalo

Head coaching record
- Overall: 19–47

Craig Cirbus is an American former football player and coach. He served as the football coach at the University at Buffalo from 1995 to 2000, compiling a record of 19–47.

Cirbus attended high school at St. Joseph's Collegiate Institute in Tonawanda, New York before playing for the Buffalo Bulls in college. After graduating, he became an assistant coach at Cheektowaga Central High School before serving as an assistant coach under Joe Paterno at Pennsylvania State University.

Cirbus now works as an investment adviser.

== Head coaching record ==
Year	Team	Overall	Conference	Standing	Bowl/playoffs
Buffalo Bulls (NCAA Division I-AA independent) (1995–1998)
1995	Buffalo	3–8			
1996	Buffalo	8–3			
1997	Buffalo	2–9			
1998	Buffalo	4–7			
Buffalo Bulls (Mid-American Conference) (1999–2000)
1999	Buffalo	0–11	0–8	7th (East)	
2000	Buffalo	2–9	2–6	T–5th (East)	
Buffalo:		19–47	2–14		
Total:		19–47			
