= 2000 Toledo Rockets football team =

American college football season

2000 Toledo Rockets football

MAC West Division co-champion
- Conference: Mid-American Conference
- West Division
- Record: 10–1 (6–1 MAC)
- Head coach: Gary Pinkel (10th season)
- Offensive coordinator: Dave Christensen (4th season)
- Offensive scheme: Multiple
- Defensive coordinator: Tom Amstutz (7th season)
- Base defense: 4–4
- Home stadium: Glass Bowl

2000 Mid-American Conference football standings
	Div			Conf.			Overall
Team	W		L	W		L	W		L
East Division
Marshall xy$	5	–	1	5	–	3	8	–	5
Akron x	5	–	1	5	–	3	6	–	5
Ohio	4	–	2	5	–	3	7	–	4
Miami (OH)	4	–	2	5	–	3	6	–	5
Bowling Green	1	–	5	2	–	6	2	–	9
Buffalo	2	–	4	2	–	6	2	–	9
Kent State	0	–	6	1	–	7	1	–	10
West Division
Western Michigan xy	4	–	1	7	–	1	9	–	3
Toledo x	4	–	1	6	–	1	10	–	1
Northern Illinois	2	–	3	4	–	3	6	–	5
Ball State	2	–	3	4	–	3	5	–	6
Eastern Michigan	2	–	3	2	–	5	3	–	8
Central Michigan	1	–	4	2	–	6	2	–	9
Championship: Marshall 19, Western Michigan 14
$ – Conference champion; x – Division champion/co-champions; y – Championship game participant; Due to an unbalanced conference schedule, the team with best division record within each division was awarded that division's championship game berth.

The 2000 Toledo Rockets football team represented the University of Toledo during the 2000 NCAA Division I-A football season. They competed as a member of the Mid-American Conference (MAC) in the West Division. The Rockets were led by head coach Gary Pinkel, who left the school after the end of the season to coach at Missouri.

== Schedule ==
Date	Time	Opponent	Site	TV	Result	Attendance	Source
September 2	12:00 pm	at Penn State*	Beaver Stadium; University Park, PA	ESPN2	W 24–6	94,296	
September 9	7:00 pm	Weber State*	Glass Bowl; Toledo, OH (Food Town Kickoff)		W 51–0	32,726	
September 16	7:00 pm	Eastern Illinois*	Glass Bowl; Toledo, OH		W 31–26	27,318	
September 23	6:00 pm	at Western Michigan	Waldo Stadium; Kalamazoo, MI		L 14–21	24,816	
September 30	7:00 pm	Central Michigan	Glass Bowl; Toledo, OH		W 41–0	20,913	
October 7	4:00 pm	at Eastern Michigan	Rynearson Stadium; Ypsilanti, MI		W 42–14	14,139	
October 14	7:00 pm	Marshall^{†}	Glass Bowl; Toledo, OH	ESPN Plus	W 42–0	34,900	
October 28	12:00 pm	at Navy*	Navy–Marine Corps Memorial Stadium; Annapolis, MD		W 35–14	27,355	
November 4	2:00 pm	at Northern Illinois	Huskie Stadium; DeKalb, IL		W 38–24	13,354	
November 11	1:00 pm	at Ball State	Glass Bowl; Toledo, OH		W 31–3	18,916	
November 22	6:30 pm	Bowling Green	Glass Bowl; Toledo, OH (rivalry)	ESPN2	W 51–17	26,531	
*Non-conference game; ^{†}Homecoming; All times are in Eastern time

== Rankings ==
Ranking movements Legend: ██ Increase in ranking ██ Decrease in ranking — = Not ranked
	Week																
Poll	Pre	1	2	3	4	5	6	7	8	9	10	11	12	13	14	15	Final
AP	—	—	—	—	—	—	—	—	—	—	—	—	—	—	25	25	—
Coaches Poll	—	—	—	—	—	—	—	—	—	—	—	—	—	—	25	25	—
BCS	Not released									—	—	—	—	—	—	—	Not released

== Roster ==
2000 Toledo Rockets football team roster
Players
Coaches
Offense

Pos.	#	Name	Class
QB	1	Tavares Bolden	Sr
WR	3	Manny Johnson	So
WR	14	Carl Ford	So
WR	17	Donta Greene	So
TB	19	Chester Taylor	Sr
OL	79	Noah Swartz	So
WR	80	Mel Long	Sr
WR	84	Erik Kost	Sr
TE	85	Greg Grothous	So
TE	86	Marcus Hairston	Fr

Defense

Pos.	#	Name	Class
CB	12	Brandon Hefflin	Fr
CB	25	James Stanley	Jr
LB	30	Tom Ward	So

Special teams

Pos.	#	Name	Class

Head coach

- Gary Pinkel (regular season)

Coordinators/assistant coaches

- Dave Christensen – Offensive coordinator and offensive line
- David Yost – Quarterbacks and recruiting coordinator
- Brian Jones – Running backs
- Cornell Ford – Wide receivers
- Bruce Walker – Tight ends
- Tom Amstutz – Defensive coordinator and assistant head coach
- Craig Kuligowski – Defensive line
- David Walkosky – outside linebackers
- Matt Eberflus – Defensive backs
- David Hutchinson – Graduate assistant
- Mark Lister – Graduate assistant
- Justin Wooley – Graduate assistant

Legend

- (C) Team captain
- (S) Suspended
- (I) Ineligible
- Injured
- Redshirt

Roster
Last update: December 5, 2023
