= 2000 Bowling Green Falcons football team =

American college football season

2000 Bowling Green Falcons football
- Conference: Mid-American Conference
- East
- Record: 2–9 (2–6 MAC)
- Head coach: Gary Blackney (10th season)
- Offensive coordinator: Tom Lichtenberg (1st season)
- Defensive coordinator: Tim Beckman (3rd season)
- Home stadium: Doyt Perry Stadium

2000 Mid-American Conference football standings
	Div			Conf.			Overall
Team	W		L	W		L	W		L
East Division
Marshall xy$	5	–	1	5	–	3	8	–	5
Akron x	5	–	1	5	–	3	6	–	5
Ohio	4	–	2	5	–	3	7	–	4
Miami (OH)	4	–	2	5	–	3	6	–	5
Bowling Green	1	–	5	2	–	6	2	–	9
Buffalo	2	–	4	2	–	6	2	–	9
Kent State	0	–	6	1	–	7	1	–	10
West Division
Western Michigan xy	4	–	1	7	–	1	9	–	3
Toledo x	4	–	1	6	–	1	10	–	1
Northern Illinois	2	–	3	4	–	3	6	–	5
Ball State	2	–	3	4	–	3	5	–	6
Eastern Michigan	2	–	3	2	–	5	3	–	8
Central Michigan	1	–	4	2	–	6	2	–	9
Championship: Marshall 19, Western Michigan 14
$ – Conference champion; x – Division champion/co-champions; y – Championship game participant; Due to an unbalanced conference schedule, the team with best division record within each division was awarded that division's championship game berth.

The 2000 Bowling Green Falcons football team was an American football team that represented Bowling Green University in the Mid-American Conference (MAC) during the 2000 NCAA Division I-A football season. In their tenth season under head coach Gary Blackney, the Falcons compiled a 2–9 record (2–6 against MAC opponents), finished in a tie for fifth place in the MAC East Division, and were outscored by all opponents by a combined total of 289 to 174.

The team's statistical leaders included Andy Sahm with 1,490 passing yards, John Gibson with 514 rushing yards, and David Bautista with 915 receiving yards.

== Schedule ==
Date	Opponent	Site	Result	Attendance	Source
September 2	at No. 6 Michigan*	Michigan Stadium; Ann Arbor, MI	L 7–42	110,585	
September 9	Pittsburgh*	Doyt Perry Stadium; Bowling Green, OH	L 16–34	11,533	
September 16	at Temple*	Franklin Field; Philadelphia, PA	L 14–31	15,231	
September 23	at Buffalo	University at Buffalo Stadium; Amherst, NY	L 17–20	8,081	
September 30	at Kent State	Dix Stadium; Kent, OH (Anniversary Award)	W 18–11	6,715	
October 7	Akron	Doyt Perry Stadium; Bowling Green, OH	L 21–27	8,008	
October 14	at Miami (OH)	Yager Stadium; Oxford, OH	L 10–24	10,987	
October 21	Eastern Michigan	Doyt Perry Stadium; Bowling Green, OH	W 20–6	8,042	
November 4	Marshall	Doyt Perry Stadium; Bowling Green, OH	L 13–20	8,091	
November 11	Ohio	Doyt Perry Stadium; Bowling Green, OH	L 21–23	6,646	
November 22	at Toledo	Glass Bowl; Toledo, OH (rivalry)	L 17–51	26,531	
*Non-conference game; Rankings from AP Poll released prior to the game
