= 2000 Miami RedHawks football team =

American college football season

2000 Miami RedHawks football
- Conference: Mid-American Conference
- East Division
- Record: 6–5 (5–3 MAC)
- Head coach: Terry Hoeppner (2nd season)
- Defensive coordinator: Jon Wauford (1st season)
- Home stadium: Yager Stadium

2000 Mid-American Conference football standings
	Div			Conf.			Overall
Team	W		L	W		L	W		L
East Division
Marshall xy$	5	–	1	5	–	3	8	–	5
Akron x	5	–	1	5	–	3	6	–	5
Ohio	4	–	2	5	–	3	7	–	4
Miami (OH)	4	–	2	5	–	3	6	–	5
Bowling Green	1	–	5	2	–	6	2	–	9
Buffalo	2	–	4	2	–	6	2	–	9
Kent State	0	–	6	1	–	7	1	–	10
West Division
Western Michigan xy	4	–	1	7	–	1	9	–	3
Toledo x	4	–	1	6	–	1	10	–	1
Northern Illinois	2	–	3	4	–	3	6	–	5
Ball State	2	–	3	4	–	3	5	–	6
Eastern Michigan	2	–	3	2	–	5	3	–	8
Central Michigan	1	–	4	2	–	6	2	–	9
Championship: Marshall 19, Western Michigan 14
$ – Conference champion; x – Division champion/co-champions; y – Championship game participant; Due to an unbalanced conference schedule, the team with best division record within each division was awarded that division's championship game berth.

The 2000 Miami RedHawks football team represented the Miami University in the 2000 NCAA Division I-A football season. They played their home games at Yager Stadium in Oxford, Ohio and competed as members of the Mid-American Conference. The team was coached by head coach Terry Hoeppner.

== Schedule ==
Date	Time	Opponent	Site	TV	Result	Attendance	Source
September 2	7:00 pm	at Vanderbilt*	Vanderbilt Stadium; Nashville, TN		W 33–30	26,240	
September 9	1:00 pm	at Eastern Michigan	Rynearson Stadium; Ypsilanti, MI		W 34–17	10,023	
September 16	12:00 pm	at No. 17 Ohio State*	Ohio Stadium; Columbus, OH	ESPN Plus	L 16–27	96,721	
September 23	2:00 pm	Kent State	Yager Stadium; Oxford, OH		W 45–14	16,298	
September 30	7:00 pm	at Akron	Rubber Bowl; Akron, OH		L 20–37	14,132	
October 7	2:00 pm	Ball State^{†}	Yager Stadium; Oxford, OH		L 10–15	16,412	
October 14	2:00 pm	Bowling Green	Yager Stadium; Oxford, OH		W 24–10	10,987	
October 28	2:00 pm	at Cincinnati*	Nippert Stadium; Cincinnati, OH (Victory Bell)		L 15–45	32,924	
November 4	2:00 pm	Ohio	Yager Stadium; Oxford, OH (Battle of the Bricks)	ESPN Plus	W 27–24	20,941	
November 11	7:00 pm	at Marshall	Marshall University Stadium; Huntington, WV		L 31–51	30,419	
November 18	1:00 pm	at Buffalo	University at Buffalo Stadium; Amherst, NY		W 17–16	6,871	
*Non-conference game; ^{†}Homecoming; Rankings from AP Poll released prior to the game; All times are in Eastern time
