= 2000 Ohio Bobcats football team =

American college football season

2000 Ohio Bobcats football
- Conference: Mid-American Conference
- East
- Record: 7–4 (5–3 MAC)
- Head coach: Jim Grobe (6th season)
- Offensive coordinator: Troy Calhoun (4th season)
- Defensive coordinator: Brian Knorr (2nd season)
- Home stadium: Peden Stadium

2000 Mid-American Conference football standings
	Div			Conf.			Overall
Team	W		L	W		L	W		L
East Division
Marshall xy$	5	–	1	5	–	3	8	–	5
Akron x	5	–	1	5	–	3	6	–	5
Ohio	4	–	2	5	–	3	7	–	4
Miami (OH)	4	–	2	5	–	3	6	–	5
Bowling Green	1	–	5	2	–	6	2	–	9
Buffalo	2	–	4	2	–	6	2	–	9
Kent State	0	–	6	1	–	7	1	–	10
West Division
Western Michigan xy	4	–	1	7	–	1	9	–	3
Toledo x	4	–	1	6	–	1	10	–	1
Northern Illinois	2	–	3	4	–	3	6	–	5
Ball State	2	–	3	4	–	3	5	–	6
Eastern Michigan	2	–	3	2	–	5	3	–	8
Central Michigan	1	–	4	2	–	6	2	–	9
Championship: Marshall 19, Western Michigan 14
$ – Conference champion; x – Division champion/co-champions; y – Championship game participant; Due to an unbalanced conference schedule, the team with best division record within each division was awarded that division's championship game berth.

The 2000 Ohio Bobcats football team represented Ohio University during the 2000 NCAA Division I-A football season. Ohio competed as a member of the Mid-American Conference (MAC). The Bobcats were led by head coach Jim Grobe, who resigned after the conclusion of the season to become the head coach for Wake Forest. They played their home games in Peden Stadium in Athens, Ohio.

== Schedule ==
Date	Time	Opponent	Site	TV	Result	Attendance	Source
September 2	12:30 pm	at Iowa State*	Jack Trice Stadium; Ames, IA	FSN	L 15–25	34,385	
September 9	2:30 pm	at Minnesota*	Hubert H. Humphrey Metrodome; Minneapolis, MN		W 23–17	41,637	
September 16	7:00 pm	Tennessee Tech*	Peden Stadium; Athens, OH		W 52–14	21,326	
September 23	2:00 pm	Akron	Peden Stadium; Athens, OH		L 20–23	20,114	
September 30	1:00 pm	at Western Michigan	Waldo Stadium; Kalamazoo, MI	ONN	L 10–23	21,412	
October 7	7:00 pm	Buffalo	Peden Stadium; Athens, OH	ONN	W 42–20	17,634	
October 14	2:00 pm	at Kent State	Dix Stadium; Kent, OH		W 44–7	8,976	
October 21	2:00 pm	Central Michigan^{†}	Peden Stadium; Athens, OH		W 52–3	20,836	
November 4	12:00 pm	at Miami (OH)	Yager Stadium; Oxford, OH (Battle of the Bricks)	FSN	L 24–27	20,941	
November 11	1:30 pm	at Bowling Green	Doyt Perry Stadium; Bowling Green, OH		W 23–21	6,646	
November 18	4:00 pm	Marshall	Peden Stadium; Athens, OH (Battle for the Bell)	ONN	W 38–28	21,217	
*Non-conference game; ^{†}Homecoming; All times are in Eastern time
