= 2000 Northern Illinois Huskies football team =

American college football season

2000 Northern Illinois Huskies football
- Conference: Mid-American Conference
- West Division
- Record: 6–5 (4–3 MAC)
- Head coach: Joe Novak (5th season)
- Offensive coordinator: Dan Roushar (3rd season)
- MVPs: Justin McCareins; Buster Sampson
- Captains: Ryan Diem; Chris Finle; Justin McCareins; Cameron Saulsby; Kevin Selover
- Home stadium: Huskie Stadium

2000 Mid-American Conference football standings
	Div			Conf.			Overall
Team	W		L	W		L	W		L
East Division
Marshall xy$	5	–	1	5	–	3	8	–	5
Akron x	5	–	1	5	–	3	6	–	5
Ohio	4	–	2	5	–	3	7	–	4
Miami (OH)	4	–	2	5	–	3	6	–	5
Bowling Green	1	–	5	2	–	6	2	–	9
Buffalo	2	–	4	2	–	6	2	–	9
Kent State	0	–	6	1	–	7	1	–	10
West Division
Western Michigan xy	4	–	1	7	–	1	9	–	3
Toledo x	4	–	1	6	–	1	10	–	1
Northern Illinois	2	–	3	4	–	3	6	–	5
Ball State	2	–	3	4	–	3	5	–	6
Eastern Michigan	2	–	3	2	–	5	3	–	8
Central Michigan	1	–	4	2	–	6	2	–	9
Championship: Marshall 19, Western Michigan 14
$ – Conference champion; x – Division champion/co-champions; y – Championship game participant; Due to an unbalanced conference schedule, the team with best division record within each division was awarded that division's championship game berth.

The 2000 Northern Illinois Huskies football team represented Northern Illinois University as a member of the West Division of the Mid-American Conference (MAC) during the 2000 NCAA Division I-A football season. Led by fifth-year head coach Joe Novak, the Huskies compiled an overall record of 6–5 with a mark of 4–3 in conference play, tying for third place in the MAC's West Division. Northern Illinois played home games at Huskie Stadium in DeKalb, Illinois.

== Schedule ==
Date	Time	Opponent	Site	TV	Result	Attendance	Source
August 31	7:00 pm	at Northwestern*	Ryan Field; Evanston, IL		L 17–35	23,352	
September 9	6:30 pm	No. 5 (I-AA) Illinois State*	Huskie Stadium; DeKalb, IL		W 52–0	24,682	
September 23	4:00 pm	at No. 20 Auburn*	Jordan-Hare Stadium; Auburn, AL	PPV	L 14–31	79,635	
September 30	12:00 pm	at Ball State	Ball State Stadium; Muncie, IN (rivalry)		W 43–14	13,859	
October 7	1:00 pm	UCF*^{†}	Huskie Stadium; DeKalb, IL		W 40–20	18,148	
October 14	6:00 pm	at Akron	Rubber Bowl; Akron, OH		W 52–35	9,487	
October 21	12:00 pm	at Western Michigan	Waldo Stadium; Kalamazoo, MI	FSN	L 22–52	27,523	
October 28	12:00 pm	Buffalo	Huskie Stadium; DeKalb, IL	ESPN Plus	W 73–10	16,586	
November 4	1:00 pm	Toledo	Huskie Stadium; DeKalb, IL		L 24–38	13,354	
November 11	12:00 pm	at Eastern Michigan	Rynearson Stadium; Ypsilanti, MI		L 32–39	4,592	
November 18	1:00 pm	Central Michigan	Huskie Stadium; DeKalb, IL		W 40–6	6,016	
*Non-conference game; ^{†}Homecoming; Rankings from AP Poll released prior to the game; All times are in Central time
