= 2000 Ball State Cardinals football team =

American college football season

2000 Ball State Cardinals football
- Conference: Mid-American Conference
- West Division
- Record: 5–6 (2–3 MAC)
- Head coach: Bill Lynch (6th season)
- Home stadium: Ball State Stadium

2000 Mid-American Conference football standings
| | Div | | | Conf. | | | Overall |
| Team | W | | L | W | | L | W | | L |
|---|---|---|---|---|---|---|---|---|---|
East Division
| Marshall xy$ | 5 | – | 1 | 5 | – | 3 | 8 | – | 5 |
| Akron x | 5 | – | 1 | 5 | – | 3 | 6 | – | 5 |
| Ohio | 4 | – | 2 | 5 | – | 3 | 7 | – | 4 |
| Miami (OH) | 4 | – | 2 | 5 | – | 3 | 6 | – | 5 |
| Bowling Green | 1 | – | 5 | 2 | – | 6 | 2 | – | 9 |
| Buffalo | 2 | – | 4 | 2 | – | 6 | 2 | – | 9 |
| Kent State | 0 | – | 6 | 1 | – | 7 | 1 | – | 10 |
West Division
| Western Michigan xy | 4 | – | 1 | 7 | – | 1 | 9 | – | 3 |
| Toledo x | 4 | – | 1 | 6 | – | 1 | 10 | – | 1 |
| Northern Illinois | 2 | – | 3 | 4 | – | 3 | 6 | – | 5 |
| Ball State | 2 | – | 3 | 4 | – | 3 | 5 | – | 6 |
| Eastern Michigan | 2 | – | 3 | 2 | – | 5 | 3 | – | 8 |
| Central Michigan | 1 | – | 4 | 2 | – | 6 | 2 | – | 9 |
Championship: Marshall 19, Western Michigan 14
$ – Conference champion; x – Division champion/co-champions; y – Championship game participant; Due to an unbalanced conference schedule, the team with best division record within each division was awarded that division's championship game berth.

The 2000 Ball State Cardinals football team was an American football team that represented Ball State University in the West Division of the Mid-American Conference (MAC) during the 2000 NCAA Division I-A football season. In its sixth season under head coach Bill Lynch, the team compiled a 5–6 record (2–3 against conference opponents) and tied for third place in the MAC West. The team played its home games at Ball State Stadium in Muncie, Indiana.

The team's statistical leaders included Talmadge Hill with 1,455 passing yards, Marcus Merriweather with 1,004 rushing yards and 48 points scored, and Sean Schembra with 484 receiving yards.

== Schedule ==
| Date | Time | Opponent | Site | Result | Attendance | Source |
|---|---|---|---|---|---|---|
| September 2 | | at No. 9 Florida* | Ben Hill Griffin Stadium; Gainesville, FL | L 19–40 | 85,095 | |
| September 9 | 1:00 p.m. | No. 25 (I-AA) Western Illinois* | Ball State Stadium; Muncie, IN | L 14–24 | 12,779 | |
| September 16 | | at No. 7 Kansas State* | KSU Stadium; Manhattan, KS | L 0–76 | 46,916 | |
| September 30 | | Northern Illinois | Ball State Stadium; Muncie, IN (rivalry) | L 14–43 | 13,859 | |
| October 7 | | at Miami (OH) | Yager Stadium; Oxford, OH | W 15–10 | 16,412 | |
| October 14 | | Eastern Michigan | Ball State Stadium; Muncie, IN | W 33–14 | 17,899 | |
| October 21 | | at Buffalo | University at Buffalo Stadium; Amherst, NY | W 44–35 | 13,064 | |
| October 28 | | at Central Michigan | Kelly/Shorts Stadium; Mount Pleasant, MI | W 38–34 | 11,837 | |
| November 4 | | Western Michigan | Ball State Stadium; Muncie, IN | L 3–42 | 18,535 | |
| November 11 | | at Toledo | Glass Bowl; Toledo, OH | L 3–31 | 18,916 | |
| November 18 | | Connecticut* | Ball State Stadium; Muncie, IN | W 29–0 | 10,195 | |
*Non-conference game; Rankings from AP Poll released prior to the game; All times are in Eastern time
