= 2000 Kent State Golden Flashes football team =

American college football season

2000 Kent State Golden Flashes football
- Conference: Mid-American Conference
- East Division
- Record: 1–10 (1–7 MAC)
- Head coach: Dean Pees (3rd season)
- Offensive coordinator: Charley Molnar (7th season)
- Defensive coordinator: Greg Colby (3rd season)
- Home stadium: Dix Stadium

2000 Mid-American Conference football standings
	Div			Conf.			Overall
Team	W		L	W		L	W		L
East Division
Marshall xy$	5	–	1	5	–	3	8	–	5
Akron x	5	–	1	5	–	3	6	–	5
Ohio	4	–	2	5	–	3	7	–	4
Miami (OH)	4	–	2	5	–	3	6	–	5
Bowling Green	1	–	5	2	–	6	2	–	9
Buffalo	2	–	4	2	–	6	2	–	9
Kent State	0	–	6	1	–	7	1	–	10
West Division
Western Michigan xy	4	–	1	7	–	1	9	–	3
Toledo x	4	–	1	6	–	1	10	–	1
Northern Illinois	2	–	3	4	–	3	6	–	5
Ball State	2	–	3	4	–	3	5	–	6
Eastern Michigan	2	–	3	2	–	5	3	–	8
Central Michigan	1	–	4	2	–	6	2	–	9
Championship: Marshall 19, Western Michigan 14
$ – Conference champion; x – Division champion/co-champions; y – Championship game participant; Due to an unbalanced conference schedule, the team with best division record within each division was awarded that division's championship game berth.

The 2000 Kent State Golden Flashes football team was an American football team that represented Kent State University in the Mid-American Conference (MAC) during the 2000 NCAA Division I-A football season. In their third season under head coach Dean Pees, the Golden Flashes compiled a 1–10 record (1–7 against MAC opponents), finished in last place in the MAC East, and were outscored by all opponents by a combined total of 359 to 128.

The team's statistical leaders included Chante Murphy with 800 rushing yards, Zach Williams with 1,120 passing yards, and Matt Curry with 511 receiving yards.

== Schedule ==
Date	Opponent	Site	Result	Attendance	Source
September 2	at Pittsburgh*	Three Rivers Stadium; Pittsburgh, PA	L 7–30	31,089	
September 9	at No. 14 Purdue*	Ross–Ade Stadium; West Lafayette, IN	L 10–45	62,181	
September 16	Youngstown State (I-AA)*	Dix Stadium; Kent, OH	L 20–26	13,642	
September 23	at Miami (OH)	Yager Stadium; Oxford, OH	L 14–45	16,298	
September 30	Bowling Green	Dix Stadium; Kent, OH (Anniversary Award)	L 11–18	6,715	
October 7	at Central Michigan	Kelly/Shorts Stadium; Mount Pleasant, MI	W 24–21 ^{OT}	16,588	
October 14	Ohio	Dix Stadium; Kent, OH	L 7–44	8,976	
October 21	at Marshall	Marshall University Stadium; Huntington, WV	L 12–34	25,646	
October 28	Western Michigan	Dix Stadium; Kent, OH	L 0–42	3,586	
November 4	at Buffalo	University at Buffalo Stadium; Amherst, NY	L 17–20 ^{OT}	7,131	
November 18	Akron	Dix Stadium; Kent, OH (Wagon Wheel)	L 6–34	5,270	
*Non-conference game; Rankings from AP Poll released prior to the game
