= Arthur Doe Jr. =

Irish-American mobster (1959–2018)

Arthur "Butchy" Doe Jr. (April 26, 1959 – June 7, 2018) was an Irish-American mobster from Charlestown, Massachusetts. His father was Arthur Doe Sr., who was killed in the late 1960s in Boston.
