= Butch (nickname) =

Butch is a nickname which may refer to:

- Frederick Alan Aikman (1919–1991), Canadian World War II flying ace
- Butch Baird (born 1936), American retired PGA and Senior PGA Tour golfer
- Butch Ballard (1918–2011), American jazz drummer
- Butch Beard (born 1947), American basketball player
- William H. Blanchard (1916–1966), US Air Force four-star general
- Émile Bouchard (1919–2012), Canadian National Hockey League player and member of the Hockey Hall of Fame
- Butch Buchholz (born 1940), American former tennis player
- Mark Butcher (born 1972), English former Test cricketer
- Butch Cassidy (1866–1908), American outlaw
- Butch Davis (born 1951), American football coach
- Ronald DeFeo Jr. (1951–2021), American murderer
- Kevin DuBrow (1955–2007), American lead vocalist of the heavy metal band Quiet Riot
- Adrian S. Fisher (1914–1983), American lawyer and public servant
- Butch Goring (born 1949), Canadian National Hockey League player
- William Edward Hanford (1908–1996), American chemist who developed the modern process for making polyurethane
- Butch Harmon (born 1943), American golf instructor and former player
- Arthur Harris (1892–1984), Marshal of the Royal Air Force during the Second World War
- Butch Hartman (born 1965), American animator, writer, director, producer, illustrator and voice actor
- Butch Hartman (racing driver) (1940–1994), American stock car racing national champion
- Bob Heffner (born 1938), American retired Major League Baseball pitcher
- Melvin Hollowell, American lawyer and politician
- Butch James (born 1979), South African former rugby union player
- Butch Johnson (1955–2024), American archer
- Butch Johnson (American football) (born 1954), former National Football League wide receiver
- John J. Lenzini Jr. (1947–1996), American Thoroughbred horse trainer
- Butch Levy (1921–1999), American football player and professional wrestler
- Butch Lindley (1948–1990), American NASCAR driver
- Butch Lochner (1931–2010), South African former international rugby union player
- Obert Logan (1941–2003), American National Football League player
- Graeme Macdougall (born 1940), Australian former rugby union player
- Ed Mierkowicz (1924–2017), American former Major League Baseball player
- Butch Miles (1944-2023), American drummer and musician
- Butch Morris (1947–2013), American jazz cornetist, composer and conductor
- Jonathan Norton (born 1958), original drummer for the band Eels
- Edward O'Hare (1914–1943), American pilot during World War II
- Butch Otter (born 1942), American politician and former governor of Idaho
- Butch Reynolds (born 1964), American former 400-meter sprinter
- Isiah Robertson (1949–2018), American National Football League player
- Harry G. Robinson III (born 1942), American architect and professor
- Roy Sanders (National League pitcher) (1892–1950), American Major League Baseball pitcher
- Walter Schindler (1897–1991), US Navy vice admiral
- Clyde J. Tate II (born 1957), American major general and army lawyer
- Butch Vig (born 1955), American musician and producer, and drummer for the band Garbage
- Roy Marlin Voris (1919–2005), American World War II flying ace and founder of the Blue Angels flight demonstration squadron
- Bill Walker (Australian footballer, born 1942), New Zealand former Australian rules footballer
- Butch Walker (born 1969), American recording artist, songwriter, and record producer
- Ray Wilkins (1956–2018), English former football player
- Butch Wynegar (born 1956), American Major League Baseball player
