= Butchie's Drive-In =

- U.S. National Register of Historic Places
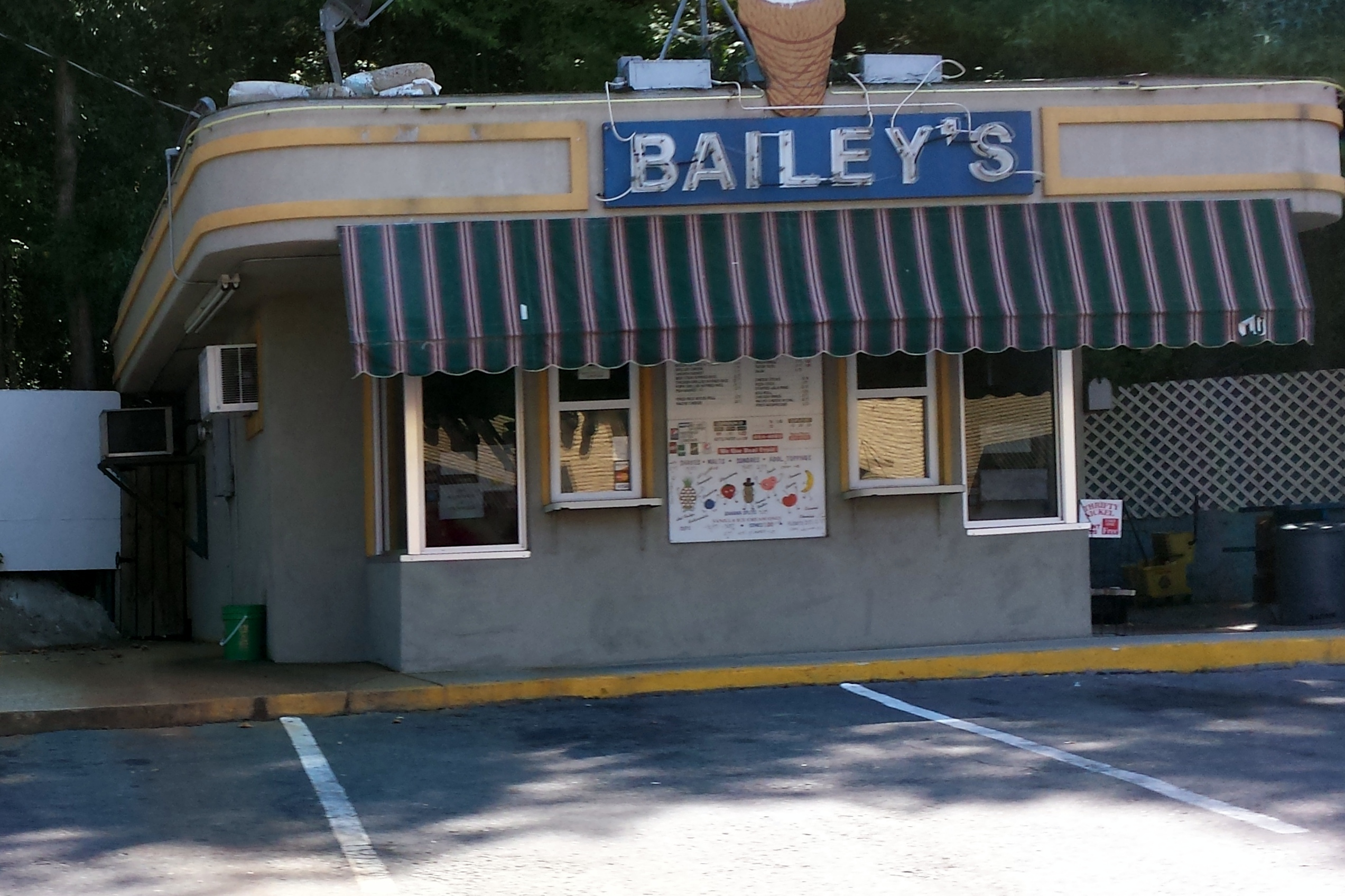

- Location within Arkansas Location within the United States
- Location: 534 Park Ave., Hot Springs, Arkansas
- Coordinates: 34°31′23″N 93°3′13″W
- Built: 1952
- Architectural style: Moderne
- MPS: Arkansas Highway History and Architecture MPS
- NRHP reference No.: 04000004
- Added to NRHP: February 11, 2004

Butchie's Drive-In, now known as Bailey's Dairy Treat, is a historic restaurant at 534 Park Avenue in Hot Springs, Arkansas. It is a small single-story Art Moderne structure, with sleek rounded lines, neon lighting, and a stucco finish. There are two service windows at the front, and the interior has retained much of its original form, even though the kitchen equipment has been upgraded. The floor is largely original quarry tile, and the bathroom has original fixtures. Built in 1952, this is one of the few establishments of this type to survive, of a number that once lined Park Avenue.

The building was listed on the National Register of Historic Places in 2004.

== See also ==
- National Register of Historic Places listings in Garland County, Arkansas
