= Butchie Washington =

American football player (born 1977)

No. 8
- Position: Quarterback

Personal information
- Born: November 5, 1977 (age 49); Columbus, Ohio, U.S.
- Listed height: 6 ft 0 in (1.83 m)
- Listed weight: 210 lb (95 kg)

Career information
- High school: Beechcroft (Columbus)
- College: Akron (1996–2000)
- NFL draft: 2001: undrafted

Career history
- Hamilton Tiger-Cats (2001–2002)

Awards and highlights
- Second-team All-MAC (2000)

James Dwight "Butchie" Washington Jr. (born November 5, 1977) is an American former professional football quarterback who played for the Hamilton Tiger-Cats of the Canadian Football League (CFL). He played college football at Akron.

== Early life ==
James Dwight Washington Jr. was born on November 5, 1977, in Columbus, Ohio. He was nicknamed "Butchie" after his father Butch. When Washington was 14, his older brother accidentally shot and killed himself at a party. Washington played high school football at Beechcroft High School in Columbus. He scored 10 passing touchdowns and 15 rushing touchdowns his senior year, earning all-state honors. Washington committed to play quarterback at the University of Akron. He also received interest from Michigan State as a defensive back but stuck with his commitment to Akron.

== College career ==
Washington played college football for the Akron Zips. He redshirted the 1996 season, and was a four-year letterman from 1997 to 2000. During his college career, he completed 471 of 931 passes (50.6%) for 6,699 yards, 38 touchdowns, and 33 interceptions while also rushing for 325 yards and four touchdowns. His 8.2 yards per pass attempt was the highest in the Mid-American Conference (MAC) in 2000, earning Washington second-team All-MAC honors. Washington set school career records for passing completions, passing yards, passing touchdowns, and total offense. His 38 consecutive starts was the second-longest streak in history for a Division I-AA quarterback. He majored in communications at Akron.

== Professional career ==
After going undrafted in the 2001 NFL draft, Washington signed with the Hamilton Tiger-Cats of the Canadian Football League (CFL) on March 27, 2001. He dressed in 17 games for Hamilton during the 2001 season, completing one of two passes for five yards. Washington dressed in all 18 games in 2002, recording 10 completions on 26 passing attempts for 99 yards and one interception. He became a free agent after the 2002 season.
