= 2000–01 NCAA football bowl games =

College football postseason game series

- Season: 2000
- Number of bowls: 25
- Bowl games: December 20, 2000 – January 3, 2001
- National Championship: Orange Bowl
- Location of Championship: Pro Player Stadium; Miami Gardens, FL
- Champions: Oklahoma
Bowl record by conference
Conference	Bowls	Record	Number of teams in final AP poll
SEC	9	4–5 (0.444)	6
Big 12	7	4–3 (0.571)	5
Big Ten	6	2–4 (0.333)	3
Big East	5	4–1 (0.800)	2
Pac-10	5	3–2 (0.600)	3
ACC	5	1–4 (0.200)	3
CUSA	4	2–2 (0.500)	0
MW	3	3–0 (1.000)	1
WAC	3	0–3 (0.000)	1
Big West	1	1–0 (1.000)	0
MAC	1	1–0 (1.000)	0

The 2000–01 NCAA football bowl games concluded the 2000 NCAA Division I-A football season. In the third year of the Bowl Championship Series (BCS) era, Oklahoma defeated Florida State in the 2001 Orange Bowl, designated as the BCS National Championship Game for the 2000 season.

A total of 25 bowl games were played between December 20, 2000, and January 3, 2001, by 50 bowl-eligible teams. Two short-lived bowl games were established for the 2000–01 season: the galleryfurniture.com Bowl (dissolved after its 2005 iteration as the Houston Bowl), and the Silicon Valley Football Classic (dissolved after its 2004 iteration).

== Non-BCS bowls ==
Date	Game	Site	Television	Teams (Note: Win–loss records are prior to the bowl game being played.)	Affiliations (Note: Reflects actual conferences of participants, for specific teams that are listed. Else, reflects conference tie-ins, which are subject to change as bowl invitations are issued and accepted.)	Results
Dec. 20	Mobile Alabama Bowl	Ladd–Peebles Stadium; Mobile, AL; 8:00 pm	ESPN2	Southern Miss Golden Eagles (7–4); No. 13 TCU Horned Frogs (10–1)	C–USA; WAC	Southern Miss 28; TCU 21
Dec. 21	Las Vegas Bowl	Sam Boyd Stadium; Las Vegas, NV; 8:00 pm	ESPN2	UNLV Rebels (7–5); Arkansas Razorbacks (6–5)	Mountain West; SEC	UNLV 31; Arkansas 14
Dec. 24	Oahu Bowl	Aloha Stadium; Honolulu, HI; 8:30 pm	ESPN	No. 24 Georgia Bulldogs (7–4); Virginia Cavaliers (6–5)	SEC; ACC	Georgia 37; Virginia 14
Dec. 25	Aloha Bowl	Aloha Stadium; Honolulu, HI; 3:30 pm	ABC	Boston College Eagles (6–5); Arizona State Sun Devils (6–5)	Big East; Pac-10	Boston College 31; Arizona State 17
Dec. 27	Motor City Bowl	Pontiac Silverdome; Detroit, MI; 4:00 pm	ESPN2	Marshall Thundering Herd (7–5); Cincinnati Bearcats (7–4)	MAC; C–USA	Marshall 25; Cincinnati 14
Dec. 27	Galleryfurniture.com Bowl	Astrodome; Houston, TX; 8:00 pm	ESPN	East Carolina Pirates (7–4); Texas Tech Red Raiders (6–6)	C–USA; Big 12	East Carolina 40; Texas Tech 27
Dec. 28	Humanitarian Bowl	Bronco Stadium; Boise, ID; 1:30pm	ESPN2	Boise State Broncos (9–2); UTEP Miners (8–3)	Big West; WAC	Boise State 38; UTEP 23
Dec. 28	Music City Bowl	Adelphia Coliseum; Nashville, TN; 4:00pm	ESPN	West Virginia Mountaineers (6–5); Ole Miss Rebels (7–4)	Big East; SEC	West Virginia 49; Ole Miss 38
Dec. 28	MicronPC.com Bowl	Pro Player Stadium; Miami Gardens, FL; 7:00pm	TBS	NC State Wolfpack (7–4); Minnesota Golden Gophers (6–5)	ACC; Big Ten	NC State 38; Minnesota 30
Dec. 28	Insight.com Bowl	Bank One Ballpark; Phoenix, AZ; 7:30pm	ESPN	Iowa State Cyclones (8–3); Pittsburgh Panthers (7–4)	Big 12; Big East	Iowa State 37; Pittsburgh 29
Dec 29	Liberty Bowl	Liberty Bowl Memorial Stadium; Memphis, TN; 1:30pm	ESPN	No. 23 Colorado State Rams (9–2); No. 22 Louisville Cardinals (9–2)	Mountain West; C–USA	Colorado State 22; Louisville 17
Dec 29	Sun Bowl	Sun Bowl; El Paso, TX; 2:00 pm	CBS	Wisconsin Badgers (8–4); UCLA Bruins (6–5)	Big Ten; Pac-10	Wisconsin 21; UCLA 20
Dec 29	Peach Bowl	Georgia Dome; Atlanta, GA; 5:00 pm	ESPN	LSU Tigers (7–4); No. 15 Georgia Tech Yellow Jackets (9–2)	SEC; ACC	LSU 28; Georgia Tech 14
Dec 29	Holiday Bowl	Qualcomm Stadium; San Diego, CA; 8:30 pm	ESPN	No. 8 Oregon Ducks (9–2); No. 12 Texas Longhorns (9–2)	Pac-10; Big 12	Oregon 35; Texas 30
Dec. 30	Alamo Bowl	Alamodome; San Antonio, TX; 8:00 pm	ESPN	No. 9 Nebraska Cornhuskers (9–2); No. 18 Northwestern Wildcats (8–3)	Big 12; Big Ten	Nebraska 66; Northwestern 17
Dec. 31	Silicon Valley Classic	Spartan Stadium; San Jose, CA; 7:00 pm	FSN	Air Force Falcons (9–2); Fresno State Bulldogs (7–4)	Mountain West; WAC	Air Force 37; Fresno State 34
Dec. 31	Independence Bowl	Independence Stadium; Shreveport, LA; 8:00 pm	ESPN	Mississippi State Bulldogs (7–4); Texas A&M Aggies (7–4)	SEC; Big 12	Mississippi State 43; Texas A&M 41
Jan. 1	Outback Bowl	Raymond James Stadium; Tampa, FL; 11:00 am	ESPN	South Carolina Gamecocks (7–4); No. 19 Ohio State Buckeyes (8–3)	SEC; Big Ten	South Carolina 24; Ohio State 7
Jan. 1	Cotton Bowl	Cotton Bowl; Dallas, TX; 11:00 am	FOX	No. 11 Kansas State Wildcats (10–3); No. 21 Tennessee Volunteers (8–3)	Big 12; SEC	Kansas State 35; Tennessee 21
Jan. 1	Gator Bowl	Alltel Stadium; Jacksonville, FL; 12:30 pm	NBC	No. 6 Virginia Tech Hokies (10–1); No. 16 Clemson Tigers (9–2)	Big East; ACC	Virginia Tech 41; Clemson 20
Jan. 1	Florida Citrus Bowl	Florida Citrus Bowl; Orlando, FL; 1:00 pm	ABC	No. 17 Michigan Wolverines (8–3); No. 20 Auburn Tigers (9–3)	Big Ten; SEC	Michigan 31; Auburn 28
Rankings from AP Poll released prior to the game. All times are in Eastern Time.

== BCS bowls ==
Each of the games in the following table was televised by ABC.

Date	Game	Site	Teams	Affiliations	Results	Reference
Jan. 1	Rose Bowl	Rose Bowl; Pasadena, CA; 4:30 pm	No. 4 Washington Huskies (10–1); No. 14 Purdue Boilermakers (8–3)	Pac-10; Big Ten	Washington 34; Purdue 24	
Jan. 1	Fiesta Bowl	Sun Devil Stadium; Tempe, AZ; 8:30 pm	No. 5 Oregon State Beavers (10–1); No. 10 Notre Dame Fighting Irish (9–2)	Pac-10; Independent	Oregon State 41; Notre Dame 9	
Jan. 2	Sugar Bowl	Louisiana Superdome; New Orleans, LA; 8:00 pm	No. 2 Miami Hurricanes (10–1); No. 7 Florida Gators (10–2)	Big East; SEC	Miami (FL) 37; Florida 20	
Jan. 3	Orange Bowl (BCS National Championship Game)	Pro Player Stadium; Miami Gardens, FL; 8:00 pm	No. 1 Oklahoma Sooners (12–0); No. 3 Florida State Seminoles (11–1)	Big 12; ACC	Oklahoma 13; Florida State 2	
Rankings from AP Poll released prior to the game. All times are in Eastern Time.
