= 2000 Kentucky Wildcats football team =

American college football season

2000 Kentucky Wildcats football
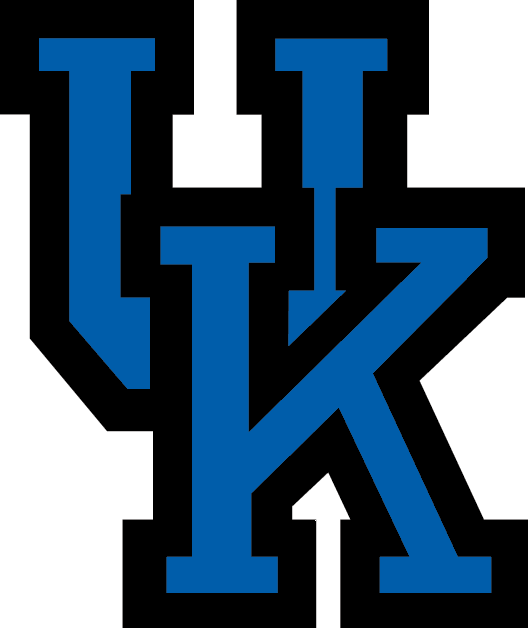
- Conference: Southeastern Conference
- Eastern Division
- Record: 2–9 (0–8 SEC)
- Head coach: Hal Mumme (4th season)
- Offensive coordinator: Tony Franklin (2nd season)
- Offensive scheme: Air raid
- Defensive coordinator: Mike Major (4th season)
- Base defense: 4–3
- Home stadium: Commonwealth Stadium

2000 Southeastern Conference football standings
	Conf.			Overall
Team	W		L	W		L
Eastern Division
No. 10 Florida x$	7	–	1	10	–	3
No. 19 South Carolina	5	–	3	8	–	4
No. 20 Georgia	5	–	3	8	–	4
Tennessee	5	–	3	8	–	4
Vanderbilt	1	–	7	3	–	8
Kentucky	0	–	8	2	–	9
Western Division
No. 18 Auburn x	6	–	2	9	–	4
No. 22 LSU	5	–	3	8	–	4
Ole Miss	4	–	4	7	–	5
No. 24 Mississippi State	4	–	4	8	–	4
Arkansas	3	–	5	6	–	6
Alabama	3	–	5	3	–	8
Championship: Florida 28, Auburn 6
$ – BCS representative as conference champion; x – Division champion/co-champions; Rankings from AP Poll

The 2000 Kentucky Wildcats football team represented the University of Kentucky as a member of the Eastern Division of the Southeastern Conference (SEC) during the 2000 NCAA Division I-A football season. Led by Hal Mumme in his fourth and final season as head coach, the Wildcats compiled an overall record of 2–9 with a mark of 0–8 in conference place, placing last out of six teams in the SEC's Eastern Division. The team played home games at Commonwealth Stadium in Lexington, Kentucky.

Mumme resigned in early 2001 following an NCAA investigation into recruiting violations. The committee concluded that Mumme was innocent of any rules violations and did not receive any individual sanctions, though the committee said that Mumme failed to properly monitor the activities of the recruiting office. While Mumme was found to be innocent, the program was found to have committed nearly 30 recruiting violations, mainly paying recruits, giving gifts to prospects, and writing papers for prospects. The Wildcats were banned from postseason play for three seasons and lost 19 scholarships over the next three seasons.

== Schedule ==
Date	Time	Opponent	Site	TV	Result	Attendance	Source
September 2	7:00 pm	at Louisville*	Papa John's Cardinal Stadium; Louisville, KY (Governor's Cup)	BBSN	L 34–40 ^{OT}	42,510	
September 9	1:30 pm	South Florida*	Commonwealth Stadium; Lexington, KY		W 27–9	63,821	
September 16	6:00 pm	Indiana*	Commonwealth Stadium; Lexington, KY (rivalry)	ESPN2	W 41–34	70,776	
September 23	3:30 pm	at No. 3 Florida	Ben Hill Griffin Stadium; Gainesville, FL (rivalry)	CBS	L 31–59	85,319	
September 30	7:00 pm	at Ole Miss	Vaught–Hemingway Stadium; Oxford, MS		L 17–35	51,448	
October 7	7:30 pm	South Carolina	Commonwealth Stadium; Lexington, KY	ESPN2	L 17–20	69,334	
October 14	8:00 pm	at LSU	Tiger Stadium; Baton Rouge, LA	PPV	L 0–34	85,664	
October 21	12:30 pm	No. 12 Georgia	Commonwealth Stadium; Lexington, KY	JPS	L 30–34	68,565	
November 4	1:30 pm	No. 18 Mississippi State^{†}	Commonwealth Stadium; Lexington, KY	PPV	L 17–35	62,159	
November 11	1:30 pm	Vanderbilt	Commonwealth Stadium; Lexington, KY (rivalry)		L 20–24	58,117	
November 18	12:30 pm	at Tennessee	Neyland Stadium; Knoxville, TN (rivalry)	JPS	L 20–59	106,437	
*Non-conference game; ^{†}Homecoming; Rankings from AP Poll released prior to the game; All times are in Eastern time

== Game summaries ==
=== At Louisville ===
	1	2	3	4	OT	Total
Wildcats	13	6	0	15	0	34
Cardinals	7	0	13	14	6	40

Statistics	UK	LOU
First downs	15	25
Total yards	417	442
Rushing yards	95	186
Passing yards	322	256
Passing: comp–att–int	22–34–3	23–30–0
Turnovers	5	4

Team	Category	Player	Statistics
Kentucky	Passing	Jared Lorenzen	22/34, 322 yards, 3 TD, 3 INT
Kentucky	Rushing	Jared Lorenzen	7 rushes, 38 yards, TD
Kentucky	Receiving	Derek Smith	6 receptions, 99 yards, TD
Louisville	Passing	Dave Ragone	23/30, 256 yards, 3 TD
Louisville	Rushing	Tony Stallings	15 rushes, 144 yards, 2 TD
Louisville	Receiving	Deion Branch	9 rushes, 123 yards, 2 TD

=== South Florida ===
	1	2	3	4	Total
Bulls	0	0	0	9	9
Wildcats	6	7	7	7	27

Statistics	USF	UK
First downs	13	28
Total yards	215	527
Rushing yards	134	145
Passing yards	81	382
Passing: comp–att–int	12–24–1	30–58–1
Turnovers	2	1

Team	Category	Player	Statistics
South Florida	Passing	Marquel Blackwell	12/24, 81 yards, INT
South Florida	Rushing		
South Florida	Receiving		
Kentucky	Passing	Jared Lorenzen	30/57, 382 yards, 3 TD, INT
Kentucky	Rushing	Chad Scott	14 rushes, 106 yards
Kentucky	Receiving	Quentin McCord	6 receptions, 120 yards, TD

=== Indiana ===
	1	2	3	4	Total
Hoosiers	7	19	0	8	34
Wildcats	7	14	10	10	41

Statistics	IU	UK
First downs	20	24
Total yards	375	418
Rushing yards	232	79
Passing yards	143	339
Passing: comp–att–int	11–26–0	33–48–0
Turnovers	2	0

Team	Category	Player	Statistics
Indiana	Passing	Antwaan Randle El	11/26, 143 yards, 2 TD
Indiana	Rushing	Antwaan Randle El	25 rushes, 83 yards, 2 TD
Indiana	Receiving	Bobby Brandt	2 receptions, 42 yards, TD
Kentucky	Passing	Jared Lorenzen	33/48, 339 yards, 2 TD
Kentucky	Rushing	Chad Scott	15 rushes, 63 yards, 2 TD
Kentucky	Receiving	Derek Smith	7 receptions, 93 yards, TD

=== At No. 3 Florida ===
	1	2	3	4	Total
Wildcats	3	14	7	7	31
No. 3 Gators	10	28	14	7	59

Statistics	UK	FLA
First downs	25	23
Total yards	504	452
Rushing yards	141	190
Passing yards	363	262
Passing: comp–att–int	35–60–2	15–27–0
Turnovers	4	0

Team	Category	Player	Statistics
Kentucky	Passing	Jared Lorenzen	35/60, 363 yards, 2 TD, 2 INT
Kentucky	Rushing	Artose Pinner	17 rushes, 125 yards
Kentucky	Receiving	Quentin McCord	5 receptions, 115 yards
Florida	Passing	Jesse Palmer	12/19, 190 yards, TD
Florida	Rushing	Earnest Graham	14 rushes, 128 yards, TD
Florida	Receiving	Jabar Gaffney	2 receptions, 54 yards, TD

=== At Ole Miss ===
	1	2	3	4	Total
Wildcats	0	3	0	14	17
Rebels	16	16	3	0	35

Statistics	UK	MISS
First downs	14	23
Total yards	231	417
Rushing yards	39	179
Passing yards	192	238
Passing: comp–att–int	17–42–3	15–25–0
Turnovers	3	1

Team	Category	Player	Statistics
Kentucky	Passing	Jared Lorenzen	17/42, 192 yards, TD, 3 INT
Kentucky	Rushing	Chad Scott	10 rushes, 26 yards
Kentucky	Receiving	Derek Abney	4 receptions, 72 yards, TD
Ole Miss	Passing	Romaro Miller	15/25, 238 yards, 2 TD
Ole Miss	Rushing	Deuce McAllister	19 rushes, 75 yards, TD
Ole Miss	Receiving	Grant Heard	5 receptions, 69 yards, TD

=== South Carolina ===
	1	2	3	4	Total
Gamecocks	10	3	7	0	20
Wildcats	7	10	0	0	17

Statistics	SCAR	UK
First downs	21	23
Total yards	387	397
Rushing yards	159	93
Passing yards	228	304
Passing: comp–att–int	17–31–0	34–52–2
Turnovers	2	2

Team	Category	Player	Statistics
South Carolina	Passing	Phil Petty	17/31, 228 yards, TD
South Carolina	Rushing	Derek Watson	23 rushes, 149 yards, TD
South Carolina	Receiving	Brian Scott	8 receptions, 157 yards, TD
Kentucky	Passing	Jared Lorenzen	34/52, 304 yards, TD, 2 INT
Kentucky	Rushing	Chad Scott	16 rushes, 85 yards
Kentucky	Receiving	Derek Abney	5 receptions, 65 yards

=== At LSU ===
	1	2	3	4	Total
Wildcats	0	0	0	0	0
Tigers	10	0	14	0	24

Statistics	UK	LSU
First downs	23	23
Total yards	397	339
Rushing yards	117	114
Passing yards	280	225
Passing: comp–att–int	31–55–1	15–33–0
Turnovers	4	0

Team	Category	Player	Statistics
Kentucky	Passing	Jared Lorenzen	31/55, 280 yards, INT
Kentucky	Rushing	Martez Johnson	11 rushes, 53 yards
Kentucky	Receiving	Quentin McCord	4 receptions, 51 yards
LSU	Passing	Josh Booty	15/33, 225 yards, 3 TD
LSU	Rushing	LaBrandon Toefield	18 rushes, 52 yards
LSU	Receiving	Josh Reed	7 receptions, 67 yards, TD

=== No. 12 Georgia ===
	1	2	3	4	Total
No. 12 Bulldogs	0	10	17	7	34
Wildcats	10	3	7	10	30

Statistics	UGA	UK
First downs	20	21
Total yards	438	620
Rushing yards	38	92
Passing yards	400	528
Passing: comp–att–int	20–38–1	39–58–2
Turnovers	1	2

Team	Category	Player	Statistics
Georgia	Passing	Cory Phillips	20/38, 400 yards, 4 TD, INT
Georgia	Rushing	Jasper Sanks	11 rushes, 19 yards
Georgia	Receiving	Damien Gary	2 receptions, 100 yards, 2 TD
Kentucky	Passing	Jared Lorenzen	39/58, 528 yards, 2 TD, 2 INT
Kentucky	Rushing	Chad Scott	17 rushes, 56 yards
Kentucky	Receiving	Quentin McCord	7 receptions, 126 yards, TD

=== No. 18 Mississippi State ===
	1	2	3	4	Total
No. 18 Bulldogs	7	7	7	14	35
Wildcats	0	6	3	8	17

Statistics	MSST	UK
First downs	23	27
Total yards	465	386
Rushing yards	253	122
Passing yards	212	264
Passing: comp–att–int	11–20–2	23–53–4
Turnovers	5	7

Team	Category	Player	Statistics
Mississippi State	Passing	Wayne Madkin	11/20, 212 yards, TD, 2 INT
Mississippi State	Rushing	Dicenzo Miller	19 rushes, 117 yards, TD
Mississippi State	Receiving	Larry Huntington	3 receptions, 81 yards, TD
Kentucky	Passing	Jared Lorenzen	23/53, 264 yards, TD, 4 INT
Kentucky	Rushing	Chad Scott	21 rushes, 119 yards, TD
Kentucky	Receiving	Derek Smith	6 receptions, 102 yards

=== Vanderbilt ===
	1	2	3	4	Total
Commodores	7	10	7	0	24
Wildcats	10	10	0	0	20

Statistics	VAN	UK
First downs	15	33
Total yards	345	577
Rushing yards	82	192
Passing yards	263	385
Passing: comp–att–int	17–29–0	33–55–1
Turnovers	1	2

Team	Category	Player	Statistics
Vanderbilt	Passing	Greg Zolman	17/29, 263 yards, 3 TD
Vanderbilt	Rushing	Jared McGrath	18 rushes, 51 yards
Vanderbilt	Receiving	Anthony Jones	3 receptions, 103 yards
Kentucky	Passing	Jared Lorenzen	33/55, 385 yards, 2 TD, INT
Kentucky	Rushing	Chad Scott	19 rushes, 92 yards
Kentucky	Receiving	Derek Smith	7 receptions, 87 yards, TD

=== At Tennessee ===
	1	2	3	4	Total
Wildcats	0	13	0	7	20
Volunteers	21	17	7	14	59

Statistics	UK	TENN
First downs	24	24
Total yards	426	590
Rushing yards	96	228
Passing yards	330	362
Passing: comp–att–int	25–49–2	19–25–1
Turnovers	2	2

Team	Category	Player	Statistics
Kentucky	Passing	Jared Lorenzen	24/46, 328 yards, 2 TD, 2 INT
Kentucky	Rushing	Chad Scott	14 rushes, 47 yards
Kentucky	Receiving	Quentin McCord	6 receptions, 157 yards, 2 TD
Tennessee	Passing	Casey Clausen	19/24, 362 yards, 4 TD, INT
Tennessee	Rushing	Travis Henry	18 rushes, 139 yards, 3 TD
Tennessee	Receiving	Cedrick Wilson Sr.	6 receptions, 117 yards, 2 TD

== Roster ==
Player	Class	Pos	Summary
Jared Lorenzen*	FR	QB	321 Cmp, 559 Att, 3687 Yds, 19 TD
Mark Perry	SR	QB	1 Cmp, 3 Att, 2 Yds, 0 TD
Chad Scott*	FR	RB	130 Att, 611 Yds, 4.7 Avg
Derek Homer*	SR	RB	38 Rec, 341 Yds, 9.0 Avg
Joel Bryan	JR	RB	1 Att, 4 Yds, 4.0 Avg
Artose Pinner	SO	RB	39 Att, 188 Yds, 4.8 Avg
Martez Johnson	SO	RB	15 Att, 61 Yds, 4.1 Avg
Kendrick Shanklin	JR	RB	4 Rec, 32 Yds, 8.0 Avg
Mike Kamphake	SO	RB	
Quentin McCord*	SR	WR	45 Rec, 799 Yds, 17.8 Avg
Dougie Allen*	JR	WR	22 Rec, 315 Yds, 14.3 Avg
Ernest Simms		WR	10 Rec, 168 Yds, 16.8 Avg
Derek Abney	FR	WR	40 Rec, 413 Yds, 10.3 Avg
Bobby Blizzard	SO	WR	23 Rec, 199 Yds, 8.7 Avg
Jimmy Robinson	SR	WR	9 Rec, 110 Yds, 12.2 Avg
Neal Brown	SO	WR	8 Rec, 38 Yds, 4.8 Avg
Anthony Kelly		WR	8 Rec, 64 Yds, 8.0 Avg
Mike Beirne	JR	WR	2 Rec, 28 Yds, 14.0 Avg
Gary Hughes	JR	WR	2 Rec, 3 Yds, 1.5 Avg
Alex Herman	SR	WR	1 Rec, 0 Yds, 0.0 Avg
Brad Pyatt	SO	WR	1 Rec, 1 Yds, 1.0 Avg
Derek Smith*	SO	TE	49 Rec, 713 Yds, 14.6 Avg
Chase Harp	SO	TE	11 Rec, 134 Yds, 12.2 Avg
Eric Arling	FR	TE	1 Rec, 10 Yds, 10.0 Avg
Edgar Gantt	SO	TE	
Matt Brown*		OL	
Keith Chatelain*		OL	
Antonio Hall*		OL	
Kip Sixberry*		OL	
Josh Parrish		OL	
Brandon Sanders	SR	K	
Otis Grigsby*		DL	
Jeremy Caudill*		DL	
Matt Layow*		DL	
Dewayne Robertson*		DL	
Chris Demaree	JR	DL	
John Robinson		DL	
Chris Gayton*		LB	
Marlon McCree*	SR	LB	
Ryan Murphy*		LB	
Ronnie Riley		LB	
Willie Gary*	SR	DB	
Kenneth Grant*		DB	
David Johnson*		DB	
Eric Kelly*	SR	DB	
Octavius Bond		DB	
Derrick Tatum	SO	DB	
Anthony Wajda	JR	DB	
Seth Hanson	JR	P	
Glenn Pakulak		P	

== Statistics ==
Points For: 254

Points/G: 23.1 (77th of 116)

Points Against: 383

Opp Pts/G: 34.8 (106th of 116)

SRS: -4.97 (81st of 116)

SOS: 5.12 (17th of 116)
