= 2000 SEC Championship Game =

- Conference Championship
- 2000 SEC Championship logo
Auburn Tigers	Florida Gators
(9–2)	(9–2)
6	28
Head coach: Tommy Tuberville	Head coach: Steve Spurrier
AP / Coaches / BCS; 18 / 17 / NR	AP / Coaches / BCS; 7 / 8 / 7
	1	2	3	4	Total
Auburn	0	3	3	0	6
Florida	14	7	7	0	28
- Date: December 2, 2000
- Season: 2000
- Stadium: Georgia Dome
- Location: Atlanta, Georgia
- MVP: QB Rex Grossman, Florida
- Favorite: Florida by 9½
- Referee: Doyle Jackson
- Attendance: 74,843

United States TV coverage
- Network: ABC
- Announcers: Brent Musburger and Gary Danielson

2000 Southeastern Conference football standings
	Conf.			Overall
Team	W		L	W		L
Eastern Division
No. 10 Florida x$	7	–	1	10	–	3
No. 19 South Carolina	5	–	3	8	–	4
No. 20 Georgia	5	–	3	8	–	4
Tennessee	5	–	3	8	–	4
Vanderbilt	1	–	7	3	–	8
Kentucky	0	–	8	2	–	9
Western Division
No. 18 Auburn x	6	–	2	9	–	4
No. 22 LSU	5	–	3	8	–	4
Ole Miss	4	–	4	7	–	5
No. 24 Mississippi State	4	–	4	8	–	4
Arkansas	3	–	5	6	–	6
Alabama	3	–	5	3	–	8
Championship: Florida 28, Auburn 6
$ – BCS representative as conference champion; x – Division champion/co-champions; Rankings from AP Poll

The 2000 SEC Championship Game was won by the Florida Gators 28–6 over the Auburn Tigers. The game was played in the Georgia Dome in Atlanta on December 2, 2000 and was televised to a national audience on ABC.
