= Erik Kimrey =

American football player and coach (born 1979)

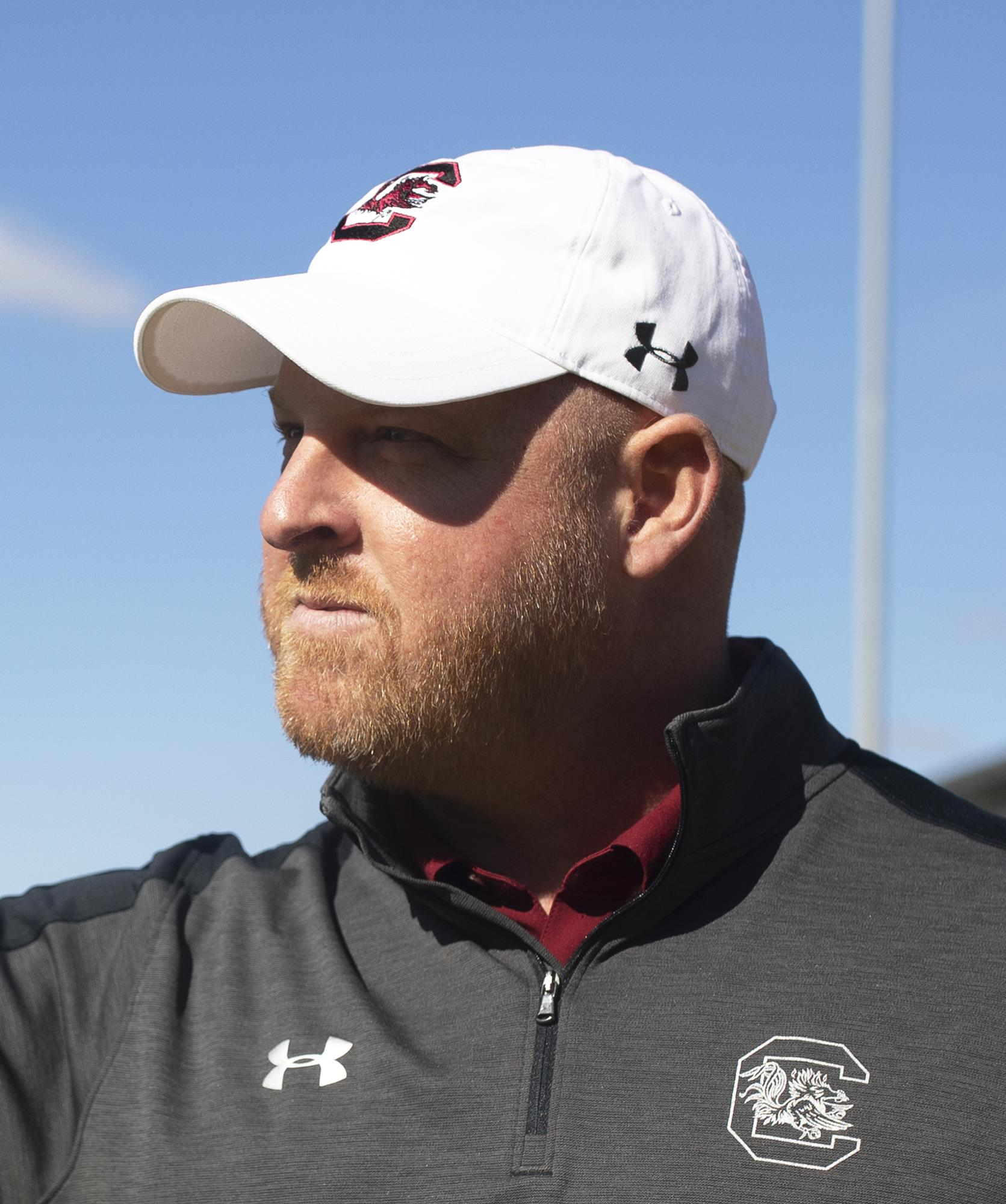
- Kimrey in 2021

Current position
- Title: Head Coach
- Team: Baylor School

Biographical details
- Born: August 1, 1979 (age 47); Columbia, South Carolina
- Education: University of South Carolina

Playing career
- 1998–2002: South Carolina
- Position: Quarterback

Coaching career (HC unless noted)
- 2003: South Carolina (GA)
- 2004–2020: Hammond School
- 2021: South Carolina (TE)
- 2022–present: Baylor School

Erik Kimrey (born August 1, 1979) is an American football coach and former player who is currently the head coach at Baylor School in Chattanooga, Tennessee. Prior to his appointment at Baylor, Kimrey served as the tight ends coach at the University of South Carolina, where he was a backup quarterback from 1998–2002. Prior to accepting his first collegiate coaching position at South Carolina, Kimrey was the head football coach at Hammond School from 2003 to 2020, where his teams won 12 state titles in 17 seasons.

== Early life ==
Kimrey grew up in Columbia, South Carolina and graduated from Dutch Fork High School in Irmo, South Carolina, where his father, Bill, was the head varsity football coach. In his senior year, Kimrey set several state records and was named the state's Offensive Player of the Year.

== Playing career ==
At the request of then-coach Brad Scott, Kimrey walked on to play quarterback for the South Carolina Gamecocks in 1998 and was named as a backup. After Scott was fired, Kimrey remained on the roster under Lou Holtz for the following three seasons. As a player, Kimrey is best known for coming off the bench to throw a fourth down game-clenching fade route touchdown pass to Jermale Kelly in the final minutes of the 2000 game against Mississippi State after the injury of starting quarterback Phil Petty. The touchdown pass became the central subject of the 2017 documentary about Kimrey, "Erik Kimrey: The Fade."

== Coaching career ==
After graduating with a Bachelor of Arts in mathematics, Kimrey worked as a University of South Carolina football graduate assistant under Holtz for two years before accepting the role of head coach at Hammond School in Columbia, where he remained for 17 seasons. During his time as head coach, Hammond won 12 state titles and had an overall record of 194-20. Kimrey was the youngest and fastest high school football coach in state history to win 100 games, and the only coach in state history to win six consecutive state championships. In addition to coaching, Kimrey taught philosophy of religion and physical education.

=== South Carolina ===
On December 27, 2020, Kimrey joined the University of South Carolina football staff as tight ends coach under head coach Shane Beamer. On February 2, 2022, Beamer announced that Kimrey had left the program. On February 3, 2022, Kimrey was announced as Head Coach of the Baylor School in Chattanooga, Tennessee.

== Personal life ==
Kimrey is married to his high school girlfriend, Erica. Together the couple has three children, Kaitlyn Dean, Karis, and Ty. Ty played on the middle school team as a running back. He has three brothers.
