= 2000 Vanderbilt Commodores football team =

American college football season

2000 Vanderbilt Commodores football
- Conference: Southeastern Conference
- Eastern Division
- Record: 3–8 (1–7 SEC)
- Head coach: Woody Widenhofer (4th season)
- Offensive coordinator: Steve Crosby (3rd season)
- Offensive scheme: Pro-style
- Defensive coordinator: Herb Paterra (1st season)
- Base defense: 4–3
- Captains: Ryan Aulds; Elliott Carson; John Markham; Matt Stewart
- Home stadium: Vanderbilt Stadium

2000 Southeastern Conference football standings
| | Conf. | | | Overall |
| Team | W | | L | W | | L |
|---|---|---|---|---|---|---|
Eastern Division
| No. 10 Florida x$ | 7 | – | 1 | 10 | – | 3 |
| No. 19 South Carolina | 5 | – | 3 | 8 | – | 4 |
| No. 20 Georgia | 5 | – | 3 | 8 | – | 4 |
| Tennessee | 5 | – | 3 | 8 | – | 4 |
| Vanderbilt | 1 | – | 7 | 3 | – | 8 |
| Kentucky | 0 | – | 8 | 2 | – | 9 |
Western Division
| No. 18 Auburn x | 6 | – | 2 | 9 | – | 4 |
| No. 22 LSU | 5 | – | 3 | 8 | – | 4 |
| Ole Miss | 4 | – | 4 | 7 | – | 5 |
| No. 24 Mississippi State | 4 | – | 4 | 8 | – | 4 |
| Arkansas | 3 | – | 5 | 6 | – | 6 |
| Alabama | 3 | – | 5 | 3 | – | 8 |
Championship: Florida 28, Auburn 6
$ – BCS representative as conference champion; x – Division champion/co-champions; Rankings from AP Poll

The 2000 Vanderbilt Commodores football team represented Vanderbilt University as a member of the Eastern Division of the Southeastern Conference (SEC) during the 2000 NCAA Division I-A football season. Led by fourth-year head coach Woody Widenhofer, the Commodores compiled an overall record of 3–8 with a mark of 1–7 in conference play, placing fifth in the SEC's Eastern Division. The team played home games at Vanderbilt Stadium in Nashville, Tennessee.

== Schedule ==
| Date | Time | Opponent | Site | TV | Result | Attendance | Source |
|---|---|---|---|---|---|---|---|
| September 2 | 6:00 p.m. | Miami (OH)* | Vanderbilt Stadium; Nashville, TN | | L 30–33 | 26,240 | |
| September 9 | 11:30 a.m. | at No. 13 Alabama | Legion Field; Birmingham, AL | JPS | L 10–28 | 83,091 | |
| September 16 | 11:30 a.m. | Ole Miss | Vanderbilt Stadium; Nashville, TN (rivalry) | JPS | L 7–12 | 36,390 | |
| September 23 | 6:00 p.m. | Duke* | Vanderbilt Stadium; Nashville, TN | JPS | W 26–7 | 35,391 | |
| September 30 | 1:00 p.m. | at No. 19 Auburn | Jordan–Hare Stadium; Auburn, AL | PPV | L 0–33 | 84,276 | |
| October 7 | 2:30 p.m. | at Wake Forest* | Groves Stadium; Winston-Salem, NC | | W 17–10 | 18,213 | |
| October 14 | 12:00 p.m. | at No. 14 Georgia | Sanford Stadium; Athens, GA (rivalry) | | L 19–29 | 86,520 | |
| October 21 | 1:00 p.m. | No. 18 South Carolina | Vanderbilt Stadium; Nashville, TN | PPV | L 14–30 | 33,369 | |
| November 4 | 11:30 a.m. | No. 6 Florida | Vanderbilt Stadium; Nashville, TN | JPS | L 20–43 | 32,714 | |
| November 11 | 12:30 p.m. | at Kentucky | Commonwealth Stadium; Lexington, KY (rivalry) | | W 24–20 | 58,117 | |
| November 25 | 2:30 p.m. | No. 25 Tennessee | Adelphia Coliseum; Nashville, TN (rivalry) | JPS | L 26–28 | 68,360 | |
*Non-conference game; Rankings from Coaches' Poll released prior to the game; All times are in Central time

== Roster ==
2000 Vanderbilt Commodores football team roster
Players
Coaches
Offense

| Pos. | # | Name | Class |
|---|---|---|---|
| WR | 1 | Anthony Jones | So |
| RB | 2 | Rodney Williams | Jr |
| QB | 12 | Greg Zolman | Jr |
| OT | 60 | Pat Green | Jr |
| G | 77 | Darren Rothenberg | Sr |
| G | 78 | Michael Saltsman | Sr |
| OT | 79 | Brent Peacher | So |
| TE | 80 | Elliott Carson | Sr |
| TE | 81 | Nick Getter | Fr |
| WR | 82 | Nezih Hasanoglu | Jr |
| TE | 83 | Zeke Brandon | Fr |
| TE | 84 | Tom Simone | So |
| WR | 85 | Dan Stricker | So |

Defense

| Pos. | # | Name | Class |
|---|---|---|---|
| DB | 5 | Aaron McWherter | So |
| CB | 9 | Jimmy Williams | Sr |
| LB | 26 | Matt Stewart | Sr |
| LB | 47 | Hunter Hillenmeyer | So |
| DT | 97 | Tyler Unzicker | Jr |
| DT | 98 | Ryan Aulds | Sr |
| LB | 99 | Reggie Washington | Jr |

Special teams

| Pos. | # | Name | Class |

Head coach

- Woody Widenhofer

Coordinators/assistant coaches

Legend

- (C) Team captain
- (S) Suspended
- (I) Ineligible
- Injured
- Redshirt

Roster
Last update: 2000-11-18
