= 2000 Alabama Crimson Tide football team =

American college football season

2000 Alabama Crimson Tide football
- Conference: Southeastern Conference
- Western Division
- Record: 3–8 (3–5 SEC)
- Head coach: Mike DuBose (4th season)
- Offensive coordinator: Neil Callaway (3rd season)
- Co-offensive coordinator: Charlie Stubbs (3rd season)
- Defensive coordinator: Ellis Johnson (4th season)
- Captains: Paul Hogan; Bradley Ledbetter; Kenny Smith
- Home stadium: Bryant–Denny Stadium; Legion Field

2000 Southeastern Conference football standings
	Conf.			Overall
Team	W		L	W		L
Eastern Division
No. 10 Florida x$	7	–	1	10	–	3
No. 19 South Carolina	5	–	3	8	–	4
No. 20 Georgia	5	–	3	8	–	4
Tennessee	5	–	3	8	–	4
Vanderbilt	1	–	7	3	–	8
Kentucky	0	–	8	2	–	9
Western Division
No. 18 Auburn x	6	–	2	9	–	4
No. 22 LSU	5	–	3	8	–	4
Ole Miss	4	–	4	7	–	5
No. 24 Mississippi State	4	–	4	8	–	4
Arkansas	3	–	5	6	–	6
Alabama	3	–	5	3	–	8
Championship: Florida 28, Auburn 6
$ – BCS representative as conference champion; x – Division champion/co-champions; Rankings from AP Poll

The 2000 Alabama Crimson Tide football team represented the University of Alabama as a member of the Western Division of the Southeastern Conference (SEC) during the 2000 NCAA Division I-A football season. Led by Mike DuBose in his fourth and final season as head coach, the Crimson Tide compiled an overall record of 3–8 with a mark of 3–5 in conference play, tying for fifth place at the bottom of the SEC's Western Division standings. The team played home games at Bryant–Denny Stadium in Tuscaloosa, Alabama, and Legion Field in Birmingham, Alabama.

Despite a preseason No. 3 ranking Alabama finished with a losing record. The 2000 season was filled with several close losses. A 30–28 loss at LSU was the Tide's first loss in Baton Rouge in 31 years, ending a 14–0–1 streak Alabama had posted there since 1969. A 9–0 defeat at the hands of in-state rival Auburn came on a cold and rainy afternoon and marked the first Iron Bowl played in Tuscaloosa since 1901. For the first time since the 1956 season, Alabama failed to win any out-of-conference games and became the first team from an AQ conference to lose to UCF, falling 40–38 at home on a last-second field goal. On November 1, athletic director Mal Moore announced that DuBose would resign at the end of the season.

== Schedule ==
Date	Time	Opponent	Rank	Site	TV	Result	Attendance	Source
September 2	2:30 p.m.	at UCLA*	No. 3	Rose Bowl; Pasadena, CA	ABC	L 24–35	76,640	
September 9	11:30 a.m.	Vanderbilt	No. 13	Legion Field; Birmingham, AL	JPS	W 28–10	83,091	
September 16	8:00 p.m.	No. 25 Southern Miss*	No. 15	Legion Field; Birmingham, AL	ESPN2	L 0–21	83,091	
September 23	8:00 p.m.	at Arkansas		Razorback Stadium; Fayetteville, AR	ESPN	L 21–28	51,482	
September 30	2:00 p.m.	No. 23 South Carolina		Bryant–Denny Stadium; Tuscaloosa, AL	PPV	W 27–17	83,818	
October 14	6:00 p.m.	Ole Miss		Bryant–Denny Stadium; Tuscaloosa, AL (rivalry)	ESPN	W 45–7	83,818	
October 21	2:30 p.m.	at Tennessee		Neyland Stadium; Knoxville, TN (Third Saturday in October)	CBS	L 10–20	107,709	
October 28	2:00 p.m.	UCF*^{†}		Bryant–Denny Stadium; Tuscaloosa, AL	PPV	L 38–40	83,818	
November 4	2:30 p.m.	at LSU		Tiger Stadium; Baton Rouge, LA (rivalry)	CBS	L 28–30	91,778	
November 11	11:30 a.m.	at No. 15 Mississippi State		Scott Field; Starkville, MS (rivalry)	JPS	L 7–29	44,114	
November 18	2:30 p.m.	No. 18 Auburn		Bryant–Denny Stadium; Tuscaloosa, AL (Iron Bowl)	CBS	L 0–9	85,986	
*Non-conference game; ^{†}Homecoming; Rankings from AP Poll released prior to the game; All times are in Central time

== Rankings ==
Ranking movements Legend: ██ Increase in ranking ██ Decrease in ranking — = Not ranked ( ) = First-place votes
	Week																
Poll	Pre	1	2	3	4	5	6	7	8	9	10	11	12	13	14	15	Final
AP	3 (3)	3 (3)	13	15	—	—	—	—	—	—	—	—	—	—	—	—	—
Coaches	3 (1)	3 (1)	14	13	—	—	—	—	—	—	—	—	—	—	—	—	—
BCS	Not released									—	—	—	—	—	—	—	Not released

== Game summaries ==
=== UCLA ===
	1	2	3	4	Total
No. 3 Crimson Tide	7	10	7	0	24
Bruins	14	7	14	0	35

The Preseason hype at Alabama was through the roof as the reigning SEC Champions came into a match up against UCLA ranked third in the country. Despite that, Alabama was physically dominated by UCLA offense as they pulled off the upset. This game marked the first meeting between the two schools since the Liberty Bowl in the 1976 season.

Statistics	Alabama	UCLA
First downs	16	26
Total yards	265	396
Rushing yards	146	171
Passing yards	119	225
Turnovers	3	0
Time of possession	22:41	37:19

Team	Category	Player	Statistics
Alabama	Passing	Andrew Zow	8–23, 92 yards, 1 INT
Alabama	Rushing	Jason McAddley	1 carry, 56 yards
Alabama	Receiving	Freddie Milons	5 receptions, 49 yards
UCLA	Passing	Ryan McCann	14–24, 194 yards, 1 TD, 1 INT
UCLA	Rushing	DeShaun Foster	42 carries, 187 yards, 3 TD's
UCLA	Receiving	Freddie Mitchell	4 receptions, 91 yards, 1TD

=== Vanderbilt ===
	1	2	3	4	Total
Commodores	0	7	0	3	10
No. 13 Crimson Tide	7	3	0	18	28

Alabama used an 18-point fourth quarter to pull away and beat Vanderbilt for the 16th straight time. This would be the last conference game Alabama would play at Legion Field.

Statistics	Vanderbilt	Alabama
First downs	13	14
Total yards	257	349
Rushing yards	85	292
Passing yards	172	57
Turnovers	0	0
Time of possession	28:11	31:49

Team	Category	Player	Statistics
Vanderbilt	Passing	Greg Zolman	12–26, 172 yards
Vanderbilt	Rushing	Ray Perkins	8 carries, 45 yards
Vanderbilt	Receiving	Dan Stricker	5 receptions, 121 yards
Alabama	Passing	Tyler Watts	3–6, 37 yards
Alabama	Rushing	Ahmaad Galloway	13 carries, 172 yards, 1 TD
Alabama	Receiving	Sam Collins	1 reception, 22 yards

=== Southern Miss ===
	1	2	3	4	Total
No. 25 Golden Eagles	7	14	0	0	21
No. 15 Crimson Tide	0	0	0	0	0

Alabama would be shut out for the first time since 1997 as Southern Miss used a pick six and a scoop and score to beat Alabama at Legion Field for the first time since 1990. After the game, Mike Dubose offered his resignation to Mal Moore but, was rejected by Moore.

Statistics	Southern Miss	Alabama
First downs	12	15
Total yards	210	217
Rushing yards	51	95
Passing yards	159	122
Turnovers	1	4
Time of possession	30:08	29:52

Team	Category	Player	Statistics
Southern Miss	Passing	Jeff Kelly	14–23, 159 yards 1 TD, 1 INT
Southern Miss	Rushing	Derrick Nix	23 carries, 80 yards
Southern Miss	Receiving	Leroy Handy	4 receptions, 55 yards
Alabama	Passing	Andrew Zow	8–18, 65 yards, 1 INT
Alabama	Rushing	Ahmaad Galloway	12 carries, 22 yards
Alabama	Receiving	Freddie Milons	7 receptions, 43 yards

=== Arkansas ===
	1	2	3	4	Total
Crimson Tide	7	7	7	0	21
Arkansas	7	7	6	8	28

Despite having the lead for the majority of the second half, Arkansas 13-play, 80-yard drive, capped off by a 9-yard touchdown pass from Robby Hamilton to Marcellus Poydras with 1:04 to go, gave Arkansas the lead and the eventual win.

Statistics	Alabama	Arkansas
First downs	22	20
Total yards	343	324
Rushing yards	226	151
Passing yards	117	173
Turnovers	1	2
Time of possession	33:56	26:04

Team	Category	Player	Statistics
Alabama	Passing	Tyler Watts	8–20, 117 yards, 1 TD
Alabama	Rushing	Brandon Miree	29 carries, 96 yards, 2 TD's
Alabama	Receiving	Terry Jones Jr.	2 receptions, 53 yards
Arkansas	Passing	Robby Hampton	20–33, 173 yards, 2 TD's, 1 INT
Arkansas	Rushing	Cedric Cobbs	18 carries, 60 yards, 1 TD
Arkansas	Receiving	George Wilson	4 receptions, 47 yards

=== South Carolina ===
	1	2	3	4	Total
No. 23 South Carolina	3	0	7	7	17
Crimson Tide	3	7	10	7	27

Milos Lewis had two critical 4th quarter interceptions that allowed Alabama to hold on the beat #23 South Carolina. The win kept Alabama's perfect record against South Carolina all time (10–0).

Statistics	South Carolina	Alabama
First downs	20	18
Total yards	349	350
Rushing yards	85	146
Passing yards	264	204
Turnovers	4	2
Time of possession	28:28	31:32

Team	Category	Player	Statistics
South Carolina	Passing	Phil Petty	7–19, 151 yards, 2 TD's, 2 INT's
South Carolina	Rushing	Derek Watson	12 carries, 42 yards
South Carolina	Receiving	Jermale Kelly	6 receptions, 107 yards, 2 TD's
Alabama	Passing	Andrew Zow	14–26, 149 yards, 1 INT
Alabama	Rushing	Ahmaad Galloway	16 carries, 96 yards, 1 TD
Alabama	Receiving	Antonio Carter	9 receptions, 75 yards

=== Ole Miss ===
	1	2	3	4	Total
Ole Miss	0	7	0	0	7
Crimson Tide	3	18	10	14	45

Alabama's 45 points are the most of any team in a game under Mike Dubose and the most for any Alabama team since 1993 in a rout of Ole Miss.

Statistics	Ole Miss	Alabama
First downs	12	21
Total yards	237	464
Rushing yards	74	168
Passing yards	163	296
Turnovers	4	2
Time of possession	28:52	31:08

Team	Category	Player	Statistics
Ole Miss	Passing	Romaro Miller	15–31, 127 yards 1 TD, 3 INT's
Ole Miss	Rushing	Joe Gunn	11 carries, 32 yards
Ole Miss	Receiving	Joe Gunn	5 receptions, 50 yards, 1 TD
Alabama	Passing	Andrew Zow	18–22, 261 yards, 1 INT
Alabama	Rushing	Brandon Miree	12 carries, 91 yards, 1 TD
Alabama	Receiving	Antonio Carter	8 receptions, 157 yards

=== Tennessee ===
	1	2	3	4	Total
Crimson Tide	0	0	10	0	10
Volunteers	7	3	10	0	20

For the 6th year in a row, Tennessee found a way to beat Alabama extending their longest win streak against the Crimson Tide. This match up was the first time both teams came into the game not ranked since 1988.

Statistics	Alabama	Tennessee
First downs	14	18
Total yards	225	309
Rushing yards	44	96
Passing yards	181	213
Turnovers	3	0
Time of possession	24:48	35:12

Team	Category	Player	Statistics
Alabama	Passing	Andrew Zow	14–29, 181 yards, 1 TD, 2 INT's
Alabama	Rushing	Brandon Miree	8 carries, 29 yards
Alabama	Receiving	Antonio Carter	5 receptions, 73 yards
Tennessee	Passing	Casey Clausen	17–24, 213 yards, 2 TD's
Tennessee	Rushing	Travis Henry	23 carries, 81 yards
Tennessee	Receiving	Cedrick Wilson	7 receptions, 67 yards, 2 TD's

=== UCF ===
	1	2	3	4	Total
UCF	10	7	17	6	40
Crimson Tide	14	10	0	14	38

Alabama could not overcome 5 turnovers as a Javier Beorlegui 37 yard field goal gave UCF the upset win on Homecoming for Alabama. This was the 2nd time under Mike Dubose that Alabama had lost its Homecoming game. On the Wednesday following the game, Mike Dubose was informed that he would not return as head coach in 2001. Coach Dubose was allowed to remain as head coach until the end of the season.

Statistics	UCF	Alabama
First downs	25	20
Total yards	378	429
Rushing yards	95	179
Passing yards	283	250
Turnovers	2	5
Time of possession	33:11	26:49

Team	Category	Player	Statistics
UCF	Passing	Ryan Schneider	27–48, 283 yards 3 TD's, 1 INT
UCF	Rushing	Corey Baker	18 carries, 46 yards
UCF	Receiving	Tyson Hinshaw	8 receptions, 102 yards, 2 TD's
Alabama	Passing	Andrew Zow	15–30, 250 yards, 2 TD's, 4 INT's
Alabama	Rushing	Brandon Miree	13 carries, 88 yards, 1 TD
Alabama	Receiving	Jason McAddley	3 receptions, 57 yards

=== LSU ===
	1	2	3	4	Total
Crimson Tide	0	7	7	14	28
Tigers	7	7	0	16	30

For the first time since 1969, Alabama lost at Tiger Stadium behind 16 fourth quarter points from LSU after Alabama had taken the lead at the beginning of the 4th quarter. Alabama scored with seven seconds left to cut the lead to two but, failed to recover the onside kick. This lost guaranteed Alabama second losing season under Mike Dubose and third since 1957.

Statistics	Alabama	LSU
First downs	19	20
Total yards	314	408
Rushing yards	164	133
Passing yards	150	275
Turnovers	3	0
Time of possession	29:35	30:25

Team	Category	Player	Statistics
Alabama	Passing	Andrew Zow	15–32, 150 yards, 2 TD's, 1 INT
Alabama	Rushing	Ahmaad Galloway	21 carries, 129 yards, 1 TD
Alabama	Receiving	Freddie Milons	7 receptions, 51 yards, 1 TD
LSU	Passing	Josh Booty	18–31, 275 yards, 4 TD's, 1 INT
LSU	Rushing	LaBrandon Toefield	21 carries, 85 yards
LSU	Receiving	Josh Reed	8 receptions, 129 yards, 2 TD's

=== Mississippi State ===
	1	2	3	4	Total
Crimson Tide	0	0	7	0	7
No. 15 Bulldogs	14	0	8	7	29

Alabama gave up a season high 538 total yards of total offense as Mississippi State beat Alabama for the third straight time in Starkville.

Statistics	Alabama	Mississippi State
First downs	12	22
Total yards	312	538
Rushing yards	31	276
Passing yards	281	262
Turnovers	2	1
Time of possession	25:07	34:53

Team	Category	Player	Statistics
Alabama	Passing	Andrew Zow	13–31, 281 yards, 1 TD, 2 INT's
Alabama	Rushing	Brandon Miree	11 carries, 23 yards
Alabama	Receiving	Antonio Carter	4 receptions, 95 yards
Mississippi State	Passing	Wayne Madkin	18–27, 262 yards, 1 TD
Mississippi State	Rushing	Dontae Walker	16 carries, 117 yards
Mississippi State	Receiving	Larry Huntington	2 receptions, 75 yards

=== Auburn ===
	1	2	3	4	Total
No. 18 Tigers	3	3	0	3	9
Crimson Tide	0	0	0	0	0

For the first time since 1901, the Iron Bowl would be played in Tuscaloosa and the first time ever at Bryant Denny Stadium. However, freezing rain, sleet, and Damon Duval's three field goals would spoil the return as Auburn would shut out Alabama for the first time since 1987. This would be the last game for Mike Dubose as head coach and would be the last time to date Alabama has been shut out. This along with the Southern Miss shut out earlier in the season, would be the first time Alabama has been shut out more than once in a season since 1957.

Statistics	Auburn	Alabama
First downs	17	8
Total yards	301	135
Rushing yards	162	23
Passing yards	139	112
Turnovers	3	1
Time of possession	37:45	22:15

Team	Category	Player	Statistics
Auburn	Passing	Ben Leard	10–20, 139 yards, 2 INT's
Auburn	Rushing	Rudi Johnson	37 carries, 130 yards
Auburn	Receiving	Lorenzo Diamond	3 receptions, 59 yards
Alabama	Passing	Andrew Zow	12–29, 112 yards, 1 INT
Alabama	Rushing	Ahmaad Galloway	9 carries, 16 yards
Alabama	Receiving	Jason McAddley	3 receptions, 45 yards

== Coaching staff ==
Name	Position	Consecutive seasons at Alabama
Mike Dubose	Head coach	4th
Neil Callaway	Offensive coordinator/Offensive line coach	4th
Ronnie Cottrell	Assistant head coach/Tight end	3rd
Charlie Stubbs	Quarterback coach	3rd
Dabo Swinney	Wide receivers coach	8th
Ivy Williams	Running backs coach	6th
Ellis Johnson	Defensive coordinator/Outside linebackers coach	4th
Charlie Harbison	Cornerbacks coach	3rd
Jeff Rouzie	Special teams coordinator/Inside linebackers coach	10th
Lance Thompson	Defensive line coach	2nd
