= 2000 Florida Gators football team =

American college football season

2000 Florida Gators football

SEC champion SEC Eastern Division champion

SEC Championship Game, W 28–6 vs. Auburn

Sugar Bowl, L 20–37 vs. Miami (FL)
- Conference: Southeastern Conference
- Eastern Division

Ranking
- Coaches: No. 11
- AP: No. 10
- Record: 10–3 (7–1 SEC)
- Head coach: Steve Spurrier (11th season)
- Offensive scheme: Fun and gun
- Defensive coordinator: Jon Hoke (2nd season)
- Base defense: 4–3
- Captains: Alex Brown; Derrick Chambers; Jesse Palmer; Gerard Warren; Alex Willis
- Home stadium: Ben Hill Griffin Stadium

2000 Southeastern Conference football standings
	Conf.			Overall
Team	W		L	W		L
Eastern Division
No. 10 Florida x$	7	–	1	10	–	3
No. 19 South Carolina	5	–	3	8	–	4
No. 20 Georgia	5	–	3	8	–	4
Tennessee	5	–	3	8	–	4
Vanderbilt	1	–	7	3	–	8
Kentucky	0	–	8	2	–	9
Western Division
No. 18 Auburn x	6	–	2	9	–	4
No. 22 LSU	5	–	3	8	–	4
Ole Miss	4	–	4	7	–	5
No. 24 Mississippi State	4	–	4	8	–	4
Arkansas	3	–	5	6	–	6
Alabama	3	–	5	3	–	8
Championship: Florida 28, Auburn 6
$ – BCS representative as conference champion; x – Division champion/co-champions; Rankings from AP Poll

The 2000 Florida Gators football team represented the University of Florida as a member of the Eastern Division of the Southeastern Conference (SEC) during the 2000 NCAA Division I-A football season. Led by 11th-year head coach Steve Spurrier, the Gators compiled an overall record of 10–3 with mark of 7–1 in conference play, winning the SEC's Eastern Division title. Florida advanced to the SEC Championship Game, beating Auburn to capture the conference championship. The Gators were invited to the Sugar Bowl, where they lost to the Miami Hurricanes. The team played home games at Ben Hill Griffin Stadium in Gainesville, Florida.

== Schedule ==
Date	Opponent	Rank	Site	TV	Result	Attendance	Source
September 2	Ball State*	No. 9	Ben Hill Griffin Stadium; Gainesville, FL	PPV	W 40–19	85,095	
September 9	Middle Tennessee*	No. 8	Ben Hill Griffin Stadium; Gainesville, FL	PPV	W 55–0	84,311	
September 16	at No. 11 Tennessee	No. 6	Neyland Stadium; Knoxville, TN (rivalry, College GameDay)	CBS	W 27–23	108,768	
September 23	Kentucky	No. 3	Ben Hill Griffin Stadium; Gainesville, FL (rivalry)	CBS	W 59–31	85,319	
September 30	at Mississippi State	No. 3	Scott Field; Starkville, MS	CBS	L 35–47	43,816	
October 7	LSU	No. 12	Ben Hill Griffin Stadium; Gainesville, FL (rivalry)	JPS	W 41–9	85,365	
October 14	No. 19 Auburn	No. 10	Ben Hill Griffin Stadium; Gainesville, FL (rivalry)	CBS	W 38–7	85,710	
October 28	vs. No. 13 Georgia	No. 8	Alltel Stadium; Jacksonville, FL (rivalry)	CBS	W 34–23	84,404	
November 4	at Vanderbilt	No. 6	Vanderbilt Stadium; Nashville, TN	JPS	W 43–21	32,714	
November 11	No. 21 South Carolina^{†}	No. 5	Ben Hill Griffin Stadium; Gainesville, FL	CBS	W 41–21	85,718	
November 18	at No. 3 Florida State*	No. 4	Doak Campbell Stadium; Tallahassee, FL (rivalry, College GameDay)	ABC	L 7–30	83,042	
December 2	vs. No. 18 Auburn	No. 7	Georgia Dome; Atlanta, GA (SEC Championship))	ABC	W 28–6	73,427	
January 2, 2001	vs. No. 2 Miami (FL)*	No. 7	Louisiana Superdome; New Orleans, LA (Sugar Bowl, rivalry)	ABC	L 20–37	64,407	
*Non-conference game; ^{†}Homecoming; Rankings from AP Poll released prior to the game

== Rankings ==
Ranking movements Legend: ██ Increase in ranking ██ Decrease in ranking ( ) = First-place votes
	Week																
Poll	Pre	1	2	3	4	5	6	7	8	9	10	11	12	13	14	15	Final
AP	9	9	8	7	3	3 (1)	12	10	8	8	6	5	4	7	7	7	10
Coaches	7	7	5	4	3	3	9	9	7	7	5	4	4	9	8	7	11
BCS	Not released									6	6	5	5	7	7	7	Not released

== Game summaries ==
=== Ball State ===
Team	1	2	3	4	Total
Ball St	7	3	9	0	19
• No. 9 Florida	12	14	7	7	40

- Date: September 2
- Location: Ben Hill Griffin Stadium, Gainesville, Florida
- Game attendance: 85,095
- TV announcers (PPV): David Steele (Play-by-play), Nat Moore (Color) & Larry Vettel (Sideline)

Scoring summary
Q1	13:50	FLA	Kirk Wells 8 yard pass from Jesse Palmer (kick failed)	FLA 6–0
Q1	9:57	FLA	Robert Gillespie 13 yard run (two-point conversion failed)	FLA 12–0
Q1	6:35	BALL	Cornelius Bowick recovered fumble in end zone (Mike Langford kick)	FLA 12–7
Q2	14:25	FLA	Robert Gillespie 1 yard run (Jeff Chandler kick)	FLA 19–7
Q2	13:33	FLA	Alex Willis 9 yard pass from Jesse Palmer (Jeff Chandler kick)	FLA 26–7
Q2	7:09	BALL	Mike Langford 32 yard field goal	FLA 26–10
Q3	12:56	FLA	Jesse Palmer 1 yard run (Jeff Chandler kick)	FLA 33–10
Q3	8:08	BALL	Safety, Robert Gillespie tackled by Evan Triggs in end zone	FLA 33–12
Q3	:59	BALL	Corey Pachman 49 yard pass from Talmadge Hill (Mike Langford kick)	FLA 33–19
Q4	11:00	FLA	Bo Carroll 75 yard pass from Jesse Palmer (Jeff Chandler kick)	FLA 40–19

=== Middle Tennessee St. ===
	1	2	3	4	Total
Middle Tennessee State	0	0	0	0	0
No. 8 Florida	21	17	10	7	55

=== Tennessee ===
	1	2	3	4	Total
No. 6 Florida	0	7	10	10	27
No. 11 Tennessee	3	9	8	3	23

=== Kentucky ===
	1	2	3	4	Total
Kentucky	3	14	7	7	31
No. 3 Florida	10	28	14	7	59

=== Mississippi State ===
	1	2	3	4	Total
No. 3 Florida	0	10	13	12	35
Mississippi State	5	11	8	23	47

September 30, 2000

The Florida Gators came into Davis Wade Stadium in Starkville, Mississippi ranked third in the nation. The unranked Mississippi State Bulldogs ran for 351 yards, 172 yards and a touchdown for Dicenzo Miller, and 156 yards and a touchdown for Dontae Walker. Bulldogs quarterback Wayne Madkin also ran for two touchdowns. The Bulldogs compiled 517 total yards of offense.

A frustrated Steve Spurrier rotated three quarterbacks including Rex Grossman. Grossman went 13 for 16 with 231 yards and two touchdowns. All together, the Gators had 494 yards and four touchdowns through the air.

Mississippi State won the game 47–35, breaking Florida's 72-game winning streak against unranked teams in front of a crowd of 43,816. After the game, the Mississippi State fans stormed the field and tore down the goal posts, parts of which ended up all over campus.

	Florida	Mississippi State
First downs	26	25
Rushed–yards	22-M78	57–351
Passing yards	494	166
Sacked–yards lost	3–23	6–58
Return yards	73	54
Passes	34–57–1	14–27–2
Punts	1–45.0	7–42.0
Fumbles–lost	2–2	2–1
Penalties–yards	7–46	10–85
Time of possession	25:16	34:44

=== LSU ===
	1	2	3	4	Total
LSU	0	3	0	6	9
No. 12 Florida	7	10	10	14	41

=== Auburn ===
	1	2	3	4	Total
No. 19 Auburn	0	7	0	0	7
No. 10 Florida	14	21	0	3	38

=== Georgia ===
#8 Florida Gators (6–1) vs. #13 Georgia Bulldogs (6–1)

Quarter	1	2	3	4	Total
No. 8 Florida	9	8	10	7	34
No. 13 Georgia	3	14	0	6	23

at Alltel Stadium • Jacksonville, Florida

- Date: October 28
- Game time: 3:30 p.m. EDT
- Game weather: Sunny • 84 °F (29 °C) • Wind N 3 miles per hour (4.8 km/h; 2.6 kn)
- Game attendance: 84,404
- Referee: Rogers Redding
- TV: CBS
- Automated ScoreBook

Game information

Florida

- Rex Grossman
  12/24, 152 yards, TD, 3 int
- Robert Gillespie
  15 rush, 79 yards, TD
- Jabar Gaffney
  8 rec, 138 yards, TD

Georgia

- Quincy Carter
  20/39, 240 yards, TD, 3 int
  12 rush, 53 yards
- Damien Gary
  5 rec, 64 yards

Scoring summary

Quarter	Time	Drive			Team	Scoring information	Score	
Quarter	Time	Plays	Yards	TOP	Team	Scoring information	FLA	UGA
1	6:36	12	61	5:28	Georgia	24-yard field goal by Billy Bennett	0	3
1	5:23	4	73	1:13	Florida	Jabar Gaffney 27-yard touchdown reception from Rex Grossman, Jeff Chandler kick no good	6	3
1	0:10	12	40	3:20	Florida	37-yard field goal by Jeff Chandler	9	3
2	5:23	2	5	0:47	Georgia	Musa Smith 4-yard touchdown run, Billy Bennett kick good	9	10
2	4:49	2	42	0:14	Georgia	Musa Smith 1-yard touchdown run, Billy Bennett kick good	9	17
2	0:30	3	26	0:39	Florida	Robert Gillespie 14-yard touchdown reception from Jesse Palmer, 2-point pass good	17	17
3	11:56	6	19	1:17	Florida	54-yard field goal by Jeff Chandler	20	17
3	4:59	10	82	3:59	Florida	Jesse Palmer 1-yard touchdown run, Jeff Chandler kick good	27	17
4	9:50	12	65	5:40	Georgia	Jasper Sanks 1-yard touchdown reception from Quincy Carter, Billy Bennett kick no good	27	23
4	4:42	2	29	0:15	Florida	Robert Gillespie 2-yard touchdown run, Jeff Chandler kick good	34	23
"TOP" = time of possession. For other American football terms, see Glossary of American football.							34	23

=== Vanderbilt ===
	1	2	3	4	Total
No. 6 Florida	10	7	19	7	43
Vanderbilt	7	6	0	7	20

=== South Carolina ===
	1	2	3	4	Total
No. 21 South Carolina	21	0	0	0	21
No. 5 Florida	3	28	10	0	41

=== Florida State ===
	1	2	3	4	Total
No. 4 Florida	7	0	0	0	7
No. 3 Florida State	14	0	13	3	30

=== SEC Championship Game ===
SEC Championship Game
#18 Auburn vs. #7 Florida

Team	1	2	3	4	Total
No. 18 Auburn	0	3	3	0	6
• No. 7 Florida	14	7	7	0	28

- Date: December 2
- Location: Georgia Dome, Atlanta
- TV announcers (ABC): Brent Musburger (Play-by-play), Gary Danielson (Color) & Jack Arute (Sideline)

Scoring summary
1	FLA	Caldwell 10 yard pass from Grossman (Chandler kick)	FLA 7-0
1	FLA	Caldwell 66 yard pass from Grossman (Chandler kick)	FLA 14-0
2	FLA	Gaffney 27 yard pass from Grossman (Chandler kick)	FLA 21-0
2	AUB	Duval 44 yard field goal	FLA 21-3
3	AUB	Duval 21 yard field goal	FLA 21-6
3	FLA	Haugabrook 12 yard pass from Grossman (Chandler kick)	FLA 28-6

=== Miami (Sugar Bowl) ===
	1	2	3	4	Total
No. 2 Miami	10	3	14	10	37
No. 7 Florida	7	3	7	3	20

== Notable players ==
- 07 QB Jesse Palmer (Sr.)
- 08 QB Rex Grossman (Fr.)
- 09 QB Brock Berlin (Fr.)
- 05 RB Earnest Graham (So.)
- 33 RB Ran Carthon (Fr.)
- 06 WR Taylor Jacobs (So.)
- 10 WR Jabar Gaffney (Fr.)
- 17 WR Reche Caldwell (So.)
- 78 T Kenyatta Walker (Jr.)
- 91 DE Derrick Chambers (Sr.)
- 57 DE Bobby McCray (Fr.)
- 61 DT Gerard Warren (Jr.)
- 45 LB Andra Davis (Jr.)
- 03 CB Lito Sheppard (So.)
- 04 S Marquand Manuel (Jr.)

== Bibliography ==
- 2009 Southeastern Conference Football Media Guide, Florida Year-by-Year Records, Southeastern Conference, Birmingham, Alabama, p. 60 (2009).
- Carlson, Norm, University of Florida Football Vault: The History of the Florida Gators, Whitman Publishing, LLC, Atlanta, Georgia (2007). ISBN 0-7948-2298-3.
- Golenbock, Peter, Go Gators! An Oral History of Florida's Pursuit of Gridiron Glory, Legends Publishing, LLC, St. Petersburg, Florida (2002). ISBN 0-9650782-1-3.
- Hairston, Jack, Tales from the Gator Swamp: A Collection of the Greatest Gator Stories Ever Told, Sports Publishing, LLC, Champaign, Illinois (2002). ISBN 1-58261-514-4.
- McCarthy, Kevin M., Fightin' Gators: A History of University of Florida Football, Arcadia Publishing, Mount Pleasant, South Carolina (2000). ISBN 978-0-7385-0559-6.
