= 2000 Auburn Tigers football team =

American college football season

2000 Auburn Tigers football

SEC Western Division champion

SEC Championship Game, L 6–28 vs. Florida

Florida Citrus Bowl, L 28–31 vs. Michigan
- Conference: Southeastern Conference
- Western Division

Ranking
- Coaches: No. 20
- AP: No. 18
- Record: 9–4 (6–2 SEC)
- Head coach: Tommy Tuberville (2nd season)
- Offensive coordinator: Noel Mazzone (2nd season)
- Offensive scheme: Pro-style
- Defensive coordinator: John Lovett (2nd season)
- Base defense: Multiple 4–3
- Home stadium: Jordan–Hare Stadium

2000 Southeastern Conference football standings
	Conf.			Overall
Team	W		L	W		L
Eastern Division
No. 10 Florida x$	7	–	1	10	–	3
No. 19 South Carolina	5	–	3	8	–	4
No. 20 Georgia	5	–	3	8	–	4
Tennessee	5	–	3	8	–	4
Vanderbilt	1	–	7	3	–	8
Kentucky	0	–	8	2	–	9
Western Division
No. 18 Auburn x	6	–	2	9	–	4
No. 22 LSU	5	–	3	8	–	4
Ole Miss	4	–	4	7	–	5
No. 24 Mississippi State	4	–	4	8	–	4
Arkansas	3	–	5	6	–	6
Alabama	3	–	5	3	–	8
Championship: Florida 28, Auburn 6
$ – BCS representative as conference champion; x – Division champion/co-champions; Rankings from AP Poll

The 2000 Auburn Tigers football team represented Auburn University as a member of the Southeastern Conference (SEC) during the 2000 NCAA Division I-A football season. In their second year under head coach Tommy Tuberville, Tigers team compiled an overall record of 9–4 with a mark of 6–2 in conference play, winning the SEC's Western Division title. Auburn advanced to the SEC Championship Game, losing to Florida Citrus Bowl. The Tigers were then invited to the Florida Citrus Bowl, where they lost to Michigan. The team played home games at Jordan–Hare Stadium in Auburn, Alabama.

Tuberville led the Tigers to their first winning season since 1997, their second SEC Championship Game appearance, and a New Year's Day appearance in the Florida Citrus Bowl, which marked the Tigers return to a bowl game for the first time in three years. Auburn shut out rival Alabama, 9–0, on November 18 in the first Iron Bowl game played in Tuscaloosa since 1901. The Tigers finished the season ranked No. 18 in the AP poll and No. 20 in the Coaches Poll.

== Schedule ==
Date	Time	Opponent	Rank	Site	TV	Result	Attendance	Source
August 31	7:00 pm	Wyoming*		Jordan–Hare Stadium; Auburn, AL	ESPN	W 35–21	76,128	
September 9	6:00 pm	at No. 19 Ole Miss		Vaught–Hemingway Stadium; Oxford, MS (rivalry)	ESPN2	W 35–27	52,368	
September 16	6:30 pm	LSU	No. 24	Jordan–Hare Stadium; Auburn, AL (Tiger Bowl)	ESPN	W 34–17	85,612	
September 23	4:00 pm	Northern Illinois*	No. 20	Jordan–Hare Stadium; Auburn, AL	PPV	W 31–14	79,635	
September 30	1:00 pm	Vanderbilt	No. 19	Jordan-Hare Stadium; Auburn, AL	PPV	W 33–0	84,276	
October 7	2:30 pm	at No. 20 Mississippi State	No. 15	Scott Field; Starkville, MS	CBS	L 10–17	43,917	
October 14	2:30 pm	at No. 10 Florida	No. 19	Ben Hill Griffin Stadium; Gainesville, FL (rivalry)	CBS	L 7–38	85,710	
October 21	1:00 pm	Louisiana Tech*^{†}		Jordan–Hare Stadium; Auburn, AL	PPV	W 38–28	82,140	
October 28	1:00 pm	Arkansas	No. 25	Jordan-Hare Stadium; Auburn, AL	PPV	W 21–19	83,642	
November 11	6:30 pm	No. 14 Georgia	No. 22	Jordan–Hare Stadium; Auburn, AL (Deep South's Oldest Rivalry)	ESPN	W 29–26 ^{OT}	85,612	
November 18	2:30 pm	at Alabama	No. 17	Bryant–Denny Stadium; Tuscaloosa, AL (Iron Bowl)	CBS	W 9–0	85,986	
December 2	3:30 pm	vs. No. 7 Florida	No. 18	Georgia Dome; Atlanta, GA (SEC Championship Game, rivalry)	ABC	L 6–28	73,427	
January 1	12:00 pm	vs. No. 17 Michigan*	No. 20	Florida Citrus Bowl; Orlando, FL (Florida Citrus Bowl)	ABC	L 28–31	66,928	
*Non-conference game; ^{†}Homecoming; Rankings from AP Poll released prior to the game; All times are in Central time

== Rankings ==
Ranking movements Legend: ██ Increase in ranking ██ Decrease in ranking — = Not ranked
	Week																
Poll	Pre	1	2	3	4	5	6	7	8	9	10	11	12	13	14	15	Final
AP	—	—	—	24	20	19	15	19	—	25	23	22	18	17	18	20	18
Coaches	—	—	—	24	22	20	13	19	—	25	22	23	19	17	17	20	20
BCS	Not released									—	—	—	—	—	—	—	Not released

== Game summaries ==
=== Alabama ===
Team	1	2	3	4	Total
• Auburn	3	3	0	3	9
Alabama	0	0	0	0	0

- Date: November 18
- Location: Bryant–Denny Stadium, Tuscaloosa, AL
- Game attendance: 85,986
- TV announcers (CBS): Verne Lundquist (play-by-play), Todd Blackledge (color) & Jill Arrington (sideline)

Scoring summary
Q1	:00	AUB	Damon Duval 22 yard field goal	AUB 3–0
Q2	:47	AUB	Damon Duval 42 yard field goal	AUB 6–0
Q4	9:32	AUB	Damon Duval 27 yard field goal	AUB 9–0

== Roster ==
2000 Auburn Tigers football team roster
Players
Coaches
Offense

Pos.	#	Name	Class
WR	2	Tim Carter	So
QB	17	Jason Campbell	RFr
RB	23	Ronnie Brown	Fr
WR	25	Ronney Daniels	RSo
RB	32	Rudi Johnson	Sr
FB	44	Heath Evans	Sr
TE	49	Lorenzo Diamond	So
C	55	Ben Nowland	So
C	61	Cole Cubelic	Sr
OT	73	Kendall Simmons	Jr
WR	81	Jeris McIntyre	Fr
TE	87	Robert Johnson	Jr
WR		Silas Daniels	RFr

Defense

Pos.	#	Name	Class
DB	5	Travaris Robinson	So
DB	36	Roderick Hood	So
LB	38	Reggie Torbor	Fr
LB	52	Mark Brown	So
LB	54	Dontarrious Thomas	Fr

Special teams

Pos.	#	Name	Class
K	20	Damon Duval	So

Head coach

- Tommy Tuberville

Coordinators/assistant coaches

- OC Noel Mazzone
- DC John Lovett

Legend

- (C) Team captain
- (S) Suspended
- (I) Ineligible
- Injured
- Redshirt

Roster
