= 2000 LSU Tigers football team =

American college football season

2000 LSU Tigers football

Peach Bowl champion

Peach Bowl, W 28–14 vs. Georgia Tech
- Conference: Southeastern Conference
- Western Division

Ranking
- AP: No. 22
- Record: 8–4 (5–3 SEC)
- Head coach: Nick Saban (1st season)
- Offensive coordinator: Jimbo Fisher (1st season)
- Offensive scheme: Pro-style
- Defensive coordinator: Phil Elmassian (1st season)
- Base defense: 3–4
- Home stadium: Tiger Stadium

2000 Southeastern Conference football standings
	Conf.			Overall
Team	W		L	W		L
Eastern Division
No. 10 Florida x$	7	–	1	10	–	3
No. 19 South Carolina	5	–	3	8	–	4
No. 20 Georgia	5	–	3	8	–	4
Tennessee	5	–	3	8	–	4
Vanderbilt	1	–	7	3	–	8
Kentucky	0	–	8	2	–	9
Western Division
No. 18 Auburn x	6	–	2	9	–	4
No. 22 LSU	5	–	3	8	–	4
Ole Miss	4	–	4	7	–	5
No. 24 Mississippi State	4	–	4	8	–	4
Arkansas	3	–	5	6	–	6
Alabama	3	–	5	3	–	8
Championship: Florida 28, Auburn 6
$ – BCS representative as conference champion; x – Division champion/co-champions; Rankings from AP Poll

The 2000 LSU Tigers football team represented Louisiana State University (LSU) as a member of the Southeastern Conference during the 2000 NCAA Division I-A football season. Led by first-year head coach Nick Saban, the Tigers compiled an overall record of 8–4 with a mark of 5–3 in conference play, placing second in the SEC's Western Division. LSU was invited to the Peach Bowl, where the Tiger defeated Georgia Tech. The team played home games at Tiger Stadium in Baton Rouge, Louisiana.

LSU's 30–28 victory over Alabama in its ninth game was the Tigers' first against the Crimson Tide at home since 1969. Alabama went 14–0–1 in Baton Rouge from 1971 to 1998.

== Schedule ==
Date	Time	Opponent	Rank	Site	TV	Result	Attendance	Source
September 2	7:00 p.m.	Western Carolina*		Tiger Stadium; Baton Rouge, LA		W 58–0	87,188	
September 9	7:00 p.m.	Houston*		Tiger Stadium; Baton Rouge, LA		W 28–13	82,469	
September 16	6:30 p.m.	at No. 24 Auburn		Jordan-Hare Stadium; Auburn, AL (rivalry)	ESPN	L 17–34	85,612	
September 23	7:00 p.m.	UAB*^{†}		Tiger Stadium; Baton Rouge, LA	ESPNGP	L 10–13	85,339	
September 30	6:00 p.m.	No. 11 Tennessee		Tiger Stadium; Baton Rouge, LA	ESPN	W 38–31 ^{OT}	91,682	
October 7	11:30 a.m.	at No. 12 Florida		Ben Hill Griffin Stadium; Gainesville, FL (rivalry)	JPS	L 9–41	85,365	
October 14	7:00 p.m.	Kentucky		Tiger Stadium; Baton Rouge, LA	PPV	W 34–0	85,664	
October 21	8:00 p.m.	No. 13 Mississippi State		Tiger Stadium; Baton Rouge, LA (rivalry)	ESPN2	W 45–38 ^{OT}	90,584	
November 4	2:30 p.m.	Alabama		Tiger Stadium; Baton Rouge, LA (rivalry)	CBS	W 30–28	91,778	
November 11	8:00 p.m.	at Ole Miss		Vaught–Hemingway Stadium; Oxford, MS (rivalry)	ESPN2	W 20–9	52,476	
November 24	1:30 p.m.	at Arkansas	No. 24	War Memorial Stadium; Little Rock, AR (rivalry)	CBS	L 3–14	43,982	
December 29	4:00 p.m.	vs. No. 15 Georgia Tech*		Georgia Dome; Atlanta, GA (Peach Bowl)	ESPN	W 28–14	73,614	
*Non-conference game; ^{†}Homecoming; Rankings from AP Poll released prior to the game; All times are in Central time

== Rankings ==
Ranking movements Legend: ██ Increase in ranking ██ Decrease in ranking — = Not ranked
	Week																
Poll	Pre	1	2	3	4	5	6	7	8	9	10	11	12	13	14	15	Final
AP	—	—	—	—	—	—	—	—	—	—	—	—	—	24	—	—	22
Coaches	—	—	—	—	—	—	—	—	—	—	—	—	—	—	—	—	—
BCS	Not released									—	—	—	—	—	—	—	Not released

== Game summaries ==
=== Western Carolina ===
Team	1	2	3	4	Total
Western Carolina	0	0	0	0	0
• LSU	20	17	14	7	58

- Date: September 2
- Location: Tiger Stadium
- Game start: 7:00 p.m. CDT
- Elapsed time: 2:48
- Game attendance: 87,188
- Game weather: Clear; 97 °F (36 °C); wind 2 mph (3.2 km/h) ENE
- Referee: Doyle Jackson

Scoring summary
Q1	14:02	LSU	Robinson 80 yard pass from Booty (Corbello kick)	LSU 7–0
Q1	4:24	LSU	Toefield 8 yard run (kick failed)	LSU 13–0
Q1	2:43	LSU	Myers 45 yard pass from Booty (Corbello kick)	LSU 20–0
Q2	11:03	LSU	Reed 47 yard pass from Davey (Corbello kick)	LSU 27–0
Q2	7:12	LSU	Henderson 32 yard run (Corbello kick)	LSU 34–0
Q2	:00	LSU	Corbello 36 yard field goal	LSU 37–0
Q3	12:50	LSU	Myers 36 yard pass from Davey (Corbello kick)	LSU 44–0
Q3	4:24	LSU	Parker 9 yard pass from Davey (Corbello kick)	LSU 51–0
Q4	4:48	LSU	Parquet 3 yard run (Kessler kick)	LSU 58–0

== Roster ==
2000 LSU Tigers football team roster
Players
Coaches
Offense

Pos.	#	Name	Class
QB	6	Rohan Davey	Jr
QB	14	Josh Booty	Jr
RB	22	LaBrandon Toefield	So
WR	25	Josh Reed	Jr
RB	31	Domanick Davis	So
WR	39	Blain Bech	Fr
TE	47	Eric Edwards	Fr
OT	68	Brandon Winey	Sr
OT	70	Louis Williams	Sr
G	73	Rob Sale	So
C	79	Jason Underwood	Jr
TE	86	Robert Royal	Jr
WR	88	Abram Booty	Sr

Defense

Pos.	#	Name	Class
DB	2	Ryan Clark	Jr
LB	7	Trev Faulk	Jr
LB	11	Bradie James	So
LB	49	Ryan O'Neal	So
DE	59	Jarvis Green	Jr
DT	95	Howard Green	Jr

Special teams

Pos.	#	Name	Class

Head coach

- Nick Saban

Coordinators/assistant coaches

- Offensive Coordinator/Quarterbacks-Jimbo Fisher
- Running Backs/Special Teams Coordinator-Michael Haywood
- Offensive Line-Rick Trickett
- Wide Receivers-Stan Hixon
- Tight Ends-Derek Dooley
- Defensive Coordinator-Phil Elmassian
- Linebackers-Sal Sunseri
- Defensive Line-Pete Jenkins
- Defensive Backs- Mel Tucker
- Graduate Assistant -Freddie Kitchens
- Graduate Assistant - Adam Gase

Legend

- (C) Team captain
- (S) Suspended
- (I) Ineligible
- Injured
- Redshirt

Roster

== LSU Tigers in the 2001 NFL draft ==
Player	Position	Round	Pick	Overall	NFL team
Brandon Winey	Defensive tackle	6	1	164	Miami Dolphins
Josh Booty	Quarterback	6	9	172	Seattle Seahawks
Louis Williams	Center	7	11	211	Carolina Panthers
