= 2000 Tennessee Volunteers football team =

American college football season

2000 Tennessee Volunteers football

Cotton Bowl Classic, L 21–35 vs. Kansas State
- Conference: Southeastern Conference
- Eastern Division

Ranking
- Coaches: No. 25
- Record: 8–4 (5–3 SEC)
- Head coach: Phillip Fulmer (8th season)
- Offensive coordinator: Randy Sanders (2nd season)
- Offensive scheme: Pro-style
- Defensive coordinator: John Chavis (6th season)
- Base defense: Multiple 4–3
- Home stadium: Neyland Stadium

2000 Southeastern Conference football standings
	Conf.			Overall
Team	W		L	W		L
Eastern Division
No. 10 Florida x$	7	–	1	10	–	3
No. 19 South Carolina	5	–	3	8	–	4
No. 20 Georgia	5	–	3	8	–	4
Tennessee	5	–	3	8	–	4
Vanderbilt	1	–	7	3	–	8
Kentucky	0	–	8	2	–	9
Western Division
No. 18 Auburn x	6	–	2	9	–	4
No. 22 LSU	5	–	3	8	–	4
Ole Miss	4	–	4	7	–	5
No. 24 Mississippi State	4	–	4	8	–	4
Arkansas	3	–	5	6	–	6
Alabama	3	–	5	3	–	8
Championship: Florida 28, Auburn 6
$ – BCS representative as conference champion; x – Division champion/co-champions; Rankings from AP Poll

The 2000 Tennessee Volunteers football team represented the University of Tennessee as a member of the Eastern Division of the Southeastern Conference (SEC) during the 2000 NCAA Division I-A football season. Led by eighth-year head coach Phillip Fulmer, the Volunteers compiled an overall record of 8–4 with a mark of 5–3, placing in a three-way tie for second in the SEC's Eastern Division. Tennessee was invited to the Cotton Bowl Classic, where the Volunteers lost to Kansas State. The team played home games at Neyland Stadium in Knoxville, Tennessee.

== Schedule ==
Date	Time	Opponent	Rank	Site	TV	Result	Attendance	Source
September 2	7:45 pm	No. 22 Southern Miss*	No. 13	Neyland Stadium; Knoxville, TN	ESPN	W 19–16	108,064	
September 16	3:30 pm	No. 6 Florida	No. 11	Neyland Stadium; Knoxville, TN (rivalry, College GameDay)	CBS	L 23–27	108,768	
September 23	4:00 pm	Louisiana–Monroe*^{†}	No. 13	Neyland Stadium; Knoxville, TN	PPV	W 70–3	107,327	
September 30	7:45 pm	at LSU	No. 11	Tiger Stadium; Baton Rouge, LA	ESPN	L 31–38 ^{OT}	91,682	
October 7	7:00 pm	at No. 19 Georgia	No. 21	Sanford Stadium; Athens, GA (rivalry)	ESPN	L 10–21	86,520	
October 21	3:30 pm	Alabama		Neyland Stadium; Knoxville, TN (Third Saturday in October)	CBS	W 20–10	107,709	
October 28	12:30 pm	at No. 17 South Carolina		Williams–Brice Stadium; Columbia, SC (rivalry)	JPS	W 17–14	84,200	
November 4	12:00 pm	at Memphis*		Liberty Bowl Memorial Stadium; Memphis, TN	FSN	W 19–17	63,121	
November 11	12:30 pm	Arkansas		Neyland Stadium; Knoxville, TN	JPS	W 63–20	107,262	
November 18	12:30 pm	Kentucky		Neyland Stadium; Knoxville, TN (rivalry)	JPS	W 59–20	106,437	
November 25	3:30 pm	at Vanderbilt	No. 25	Adelphia Coliseum; Nashville, TN (rivalry)	JPS	W 28–26	68,360	
January 1	11:00 am	vs. No. 11 Kansas State*	No. 21	Cotton Bowl; Dallas, TX (Cotton Bowl)	FOX	L 21–35	63,465	
*Non-conference game; ^{†}Homecoming; Rankings from AP Poll released prior to the game; All times are in Eastern time

== Rankings ==
Ranking movements Legend: ██ Increase in ranking ██ Decrease in ranking — = Not ranked
	Week																
Poll	Pre	1	2	3	4	5	6	7	8	9	10	11	12	13	14	15	Final
AP	12	13	12	11	13	11	21	—	—	—	—	—	—	25	21	21	—
Coaches	12	12	11	9	13	11	21	—	—	—	—	—	25	24	21	21	25
BCS	Not released									—	—	—	—	—	—	—	Not released

== Roster ==
2000 Tennessee Volunteers football team roster
Players
Coaches
Offense

Pos.	#	Name	Class
WR	4	Donte' Stallworth	So
QB	7	Casey Clausen	Fr
WR	14	Cedrick Wilson Sr.	Sr
RB	20	Travis Henry	Sr
TE	83	Courtney Rogers	Fr
TE	84	Neil Johnson	Sr
WR	86	Josh Houston	Sr
WR	87	David Martin	Sr

Defense

Pos.	#	Name	Class
DE	1	Jason Witten	Fr
LB	22	Anthony Sessions	Sr
LB	42	Eric Westmoreland	Sr
DE	56	Bernard Jackson	Jr
DT	92	Albert Haynesworth	So
DT	97	Kevin Young	Fr
DT	98	John Henderson	Sr
DE	99	DeAngelo Lloyd	Sr

Special teams

Pos.	#	Name	Class
P	43	David Leaverton	Sr

Head coach

- Phillip Fulmer

Coordinators/assistant coaches

- Randy Sanders – Offensive coordinator/quarterbacks
- Woody McCorvey – Running backs
- Pat Washington – Wide receivers
- Mark Bradley – Tight ends/assistant offensive line
- Mike Barry – Offensive line
- John Chavis – Defensive coordinator/linebackers
- Dan Brooks – Defensive line/recruiting coordinator
- Larry Slade – Defensive backs
- Steve Caldwell – Special teams/defensive ends
- Ryan Held – Graduate assistant
- Shawn Quinn – Graduate assistant

Legend

- (C) Team captain
- (S) Suspended
- (I) Ineligible
- Injured
- Redshirt

Roster

== Awards and honors ==
- John Henderson, Defensive tackle: Outland Trophy
- Shawn Hobbs, wide receiver: longest SEC reception (89)

== Team players drafted into the NFL ==
Player	Position	Round	Pick	NFL club
Travis Henry	Running back	2	58	Buffalo Bills
Eric Westmoreland	Linebacker	3	73	Jacksonville Jaguars
David Leaverton	Punter	5	142	Jacksonville Jaguars
Cedrick Wilson	Wide receiver	6	169	San Francisco 49ers
David Martin	Tight end	6	198	Green Bay Packers
