= 2000 Ole Miss Rebels football team =

American college football season

2000 Ole Miss Rebels football

Music City Bowl, L 38–49 vs. West Virginia
- Conference: Southeastern Conference
- Western Division
- Record: 7–5 (4–4 SEC)
- Head coach: David Cutcliffe (2nd season)
- Offensive coordinator: John Latina (1st season)
- Offensive scheme: Pro-style
- Defensive coordinator: Art Kaufman (6th season)
- Base defense: 4–3
- Home stadium: Vaught–Hemingway Stadium

2000 Southeastern Conference football standings
	Conf.			Overall
Team	W		L	W		L
Eastern Division
No. 10 Florida x$	7	–	1	10	–	3
No. 19 South Carolina	5	–	3	8	–	4
No. 20 Georgia	5	–	3	8	–	4
Tennessee	5	–	3	8	–	4
Vanderbilt	1	–	7	3	–	8
Kentucky	0	–	8	2	–	9
Western Division
No. 18 Auburn x	6	–	2	9	–	4
No. 22 LSU	5	–	3	8	–	4
Ole Miss	4	–	4	7	–	5
No. 24 Mississippi State	4	–	4	8	–	4
Arkansas	3	–	5	6	–	6
Alabama	3	–	5	3	–	8
Championship: Florida 28, Auburn 6
$ – BCS representative as conference champion; x – Division champion/co-champions; Rankings from AP Poll

The 2000 Ole Miss Rebels football team represented the University of Mississippi during the 2000 NCAA Division I-A football season. They participated as members of the Southeastern Conference in the West Division. Coached by David Cutcliffe, the Rebels played their home games at Vaught–Hemingway Stadium in Oxford, Mississippi.

== Schedule ==
Date	Time	Opponent	Rank	Site	TV	Result	Attendance	Source
September 2	11:30 am	Tulane*	No. 18	Vaught–Hemingway Stadium; Oxford, MS (rivalry)	JPS	W 49–20	46,847	
September 9	6:00 pm	Auburn	No. 19	Vaught–Hemingway Stadium; Oxford, MS (rivalry)	ESPN2	L 27–35	52,368	
September 16	11:30 am	at Vanderbilt		Vanderbilt Stadium; Nashville, TN (rivalry)	JPS	W 12–7	36,390	
September 30	6:00 pm	Kentucky		Vaught–Hemingway Stadium; Oxford, MS		W 35–17	51,448	
October 7	1:00 pm	Arkansas State*		Vaught–Hemingway Stadium; Oxford, MS		W 35–10	44,042	
October 14	6:00 pm	at Alabama		Bryant–Denny Stadium; Tuscaloosa, AL (rivalry)	ESPN	L 7–45	83,818	
October 28	1:00 pm	UNLV*		Vaught–Hemingway Stadium; Oxford, MS		W 43–40 ^{OT}	40,338	
November 4	1:00 pm	at Arkansas		Razorback Stadium; Fayetteville, AR (rivalry)		W 38–24	49,647	
November 11	8:00 pm	LSU		Vaught–Hemingway Stadium; Oxford, MS (rivalry)	ESPN2	L 9–20	52,476	
November 18	5:00 pm	at No. 21 Georgia		Sanford Stadium; Athens, GA	ESPN2	L 14–32	76,248	
November 23	7:00 pm	No. 23 Mississippi State		Vaught–Hemingway Stadium; Oxford, MS (Egg Bowl)	ESPN	W 45–30	48,811	
December 28	3:00 pm	vs. West Virginia*		Adelphia Coliseum; Nashville, TN (Music City Bowl)	ESPN	L 38–49	47,119	
*Non-conference game; Rankings from AP Poll released prior to the game; All times are in Central time

== Rankings ==
Ranking movements Legend: ██ Increase in ranking ██ Decrease in ranking — = Not ranked
	Week																
Poll	Pre	1	2	3	4	5	6	7	8	9	10	11	12	13	14	15	Final
AP	18	18	19	—	—	—	—	—	—	—	—	—	—	—	—	—	—
Coaches Poll	18	17	18	—	—	—	—	—	—	—	—	—	—	—	—	—	—
BCS	Not released									—	—	—	—	—	—	—	Not released

== Roster ==
- QB Eli Manning, Fr.
- RB Deuce McAllister, Sr.
- DB Kenny Woods, Sr.
