= 2000 South Carolina Gamecocks football team =

American college football season

2000 South Carolina Gamecocks football

Outback Bowl champion

Outback Bowl, W 24–7 vs. Ohio State
- Conference: Southeastern Conference
- Eastern Division

Ranking
- Coaches: No. 21
- AP: No. 19
- Record: 8–4 (5–3 SEC)
- Head coach: Lou Holtz (2nd season)
- Offensive coordinator: Skip Holtz (2nd season)
- Offensive scheme: Spread
- Defensive coordinator: Charlie Strong (2nd season)
- Base defense: 3–3–5
- Home stadium: Williams–Brice Stadium

2000 Southeastern Conference football standings
	Conf.			Overall
Team	W		L	W		L
Eastern Division
No. 10 Florida x$	7	–	1	10	–	3
No. 19 South Carolina	5	–	3	8	–	4
No. 20 Georgia	5	–	3	8	–	4
Tennessee	5	–	3	8	–	4
Vanderbilt	1	–	7	3	–	8
Kentucky	0	–	8	2	–	9
Western Division
No. 18 Auburn x	6	–	2	9	–	4
No. 22 LSU	5	–	3	8	–	4
Ole Miss	4	–	4	7	–	5
No. 24 Mississippi State	4	–	4	8	–	4
Arkansas	3	–	5	6	–	6
Alabama	3	–	5	3	–	8
Championship: Florida 28, Auburn 6
$ – BCS representative as conference champion; x – Division champion/co-champions; Rankings from AP Poll

The 2000 South Carolina Gamecocks football team represented the University of South Carolina as a member of the Eastern Division of the Southeastern Conference (SEC) during the 2000 NCAA Division I-A football season. Led by second-year head coach Lou Holtz, the Gamecocks compiled an overall record of 8–4 with a mark of 5–3 in conference play, placing in a three-way tie for second in the SEC's Eastern Division. The team played home games at Williams–Brice Stadium in Columbia, South Carolina.

South Carolina made one of the biggest turnarounds in college football history, going from a winless season in 1999 to an eight-win campaign in 2000. Their first win of the season, against New Mexico State, snapped a 21-game losing streak which dated back to 1998. South Carolina's turnaround in conference play was also one of the biggest in SEC history, going from 0–8 in 1999 to 5–3 in 2000, including a victory against heavily favored No. 10 Georgia that ended the Gamecocks' SEC losing streak. South Carolina fans tore down the goalposts at Williams–Brice Stadium on both occasions in celebration. Before the program's last-ever "Orange Crush" ending the regular season, the Gamecocks were ranked No. 17, their highest ranking since 1988. On the first day of the 21st century, the Gamecocks defeated No. 19 Ohio State in the Outback Bowl, their first bowl appearance since 1994 and only the second bowl victory in school history. South Carolina finished the season ranked No. 19 in the AP poll and No. 21 in the Coaches Poll, which was only the fourth final ranking in program history.

== Schedule ==
Date	Time	Opponent	Rank	Site	TV	Result	Attendance	Source
September 2	7:00 pm	New Mexico State*		Williams–Brice Stadium; Columbia, SC	PPV	W 31–0	80,814	
September 9	3:30 pm	No. 10 Georgia		Williams–Brice Stadium; Columbia, SC (rivalry)	ESPN2	W 21–10	83,605	
September 16	7:00 pm	Eastern Michigan*		Williams–Brice Stadium; Columbia, SC	PPV	W 41–6	80,922	
September 23	12:30 pm	No. 25 Mississippi State		Williams–Brice Stadium; Columbia, SC	JPS/CSS	W 23–19	79,949	
September 30	3:00 pm	at Alabama	No. 23	Bryant–Denny Stadium; Tuscaloosa, AL	PPV	L 17–27	83,818	
October 7	7:00 pm	at Kentucky		Commonwealth Stadium; Lexington, KY	ESPN2	W 20–17	69,334	
October 14	12:30 pm	Arkansas^{†}	No. 24	Williams–Brice Stadium; Columbia, SC	JPS	W 27–7	81,935	
October 21	2:00 pm	at Vanderbilt	No. 18	Vanderbilt Stadium; Nashville, TN	PPV	W 30–14	33,369	
October 28	12:30 pm	Tennessee	No. 17	Williams–Brice Stadium; Columbia, SC (rivalry)	JPS	L 14–17	84,200	
November 11	3:30 pm	at No. 4 Florida	No. 21	Ben Hill Griffin Stadium; Gainesville, FL	CBS	L 21–41	85,718	
November 18	3:30 pm	at No. 14 Clemson*	No. 25	Memorial Stadium; Clemson, SC (rivalry)	ABC	L 14–16	85,187	
January 1	11:00 am	vs. No. 18 Ohio State*		Raymond James Stadium; Tampa, FL (Outback Bowl)	ESPN	W 24–7	65,229	
*Non-conference game; ^{†}Homecoming; Rankings from AP Poll released prior to the game; All times are in Eastern time

== Rankings ==
Ranking movements Legend: ██ Increase in ranking ██ Decrease in ranking — = Not ranked
	Week																
Poll	Pre	1	2	3	4	5	6	7	8	9	10	11	12	13	14	15	Final
AP	—	—	—	—	—	23	—	24	18	17	22	21	25	—	—	—	19
Coaches Poll	—	—	—	—	—	23	—	24	19	18	24	25	—	—	—	—	21
BCS	Not released									—	—	—	—	—	—	—	Not released

== Roster ==
2000 South Carolina Gamecocks football team roster
Players
Coaches
Offense

Pos.	#	Name	Class
RB	4	Andrew Pinnock	So
QB	5	Dondrial Pinkins	Fr
RB	6	Trevin Smith	Fr
WR	7	Michael Ages	So
WR	8	Ted Crawford	Fr
QB	14	Phil Petty	Jr
WR	15	Kevin Sides	Sr
RB	16	Jamaica Jackson	Fr
QB	17	Mikal Goodman	So
QB	18	Josh Rogers	Jr
RB	19	Andrea Gause	Fr
QB		Erik Kimrey	Jr

Defense

Pos.	#	Name	Class
CB	24	Sheldon Brown	Jr
DB	32	Dunta Robinson	Fr
LB	33	Jeremiah Garrison	Fr
LB	34	Rod Thomas	So
CB	35	Andre Goodman	Jr
DE	55	Kalimba Edwards	Jr
NT	57	Langston Moore	So
DB	30	O'Rondai Cox	Jr

Special teams

Pos.	#	Name	Class

Head coach

- Lou Holtz

Coordinators/assistant coaches

- Skip Holtz, offensive coordinator, quarterbacks
- Charlie Strong, defensive coordinator, defensive line
- Dave DeGuglielmo, offensive line
- John Gutekunst, defensive backs
- Oliver Pough running backs
- Dave Roberts, tight ends
- Chris Cosh, linebackers
- Todd Fitch, wide receivers
- Paul Lounsberry, offensive line

Legend

- (C) Team captain
- (S) Suspended
- (I) Ineligible
- Injured
- Redshirt

Roster
