= 2000 Georgia Bulldogs football team =

American college football season

2000 Georgia Bulldogs football

Oahu Bowl champion

Oahu Bowl, W 37–14 vs. Virginia
- Conference: Southeastern Conference
- Eastern Division

Ranking
- Coaches: No. 17
- AP: No. 20
- Record: 8–4 (5–3 SEC)
- Head coach: Jim Donnan (5th season)
- Offensive scheme: Pro-style
- Defensive coordinator: Gary Gibbs (1st season)
- Base defense: 4–3
- Home stadium: Sanford Stadium

2000 Southeastern Conference football standings
	Conf.			Overall
Team	W		L	W		L
Eastern Division
No. 10 Florida x$	7	–	1	10	–	3
No. 19 South Carolina	5	–	3	8	–	4
No. 20 Georgia	5	–	3	8	–	4
Tennessee	5	–	3	8	–	4
Vanderbilt	1	–	7	3	–	8
Kentucky	0	–	8	2	–	9
Western Division
No. 18 Auburn x	6	–	2	9	–	4
No. 22 LSU	5	–	3	8	–	4
Ole Miss	4	–	4	7	–	5
No. 24 Mississippi State	4	–	4	8	–	4
Arkansas	3	–	5	6	–	6
Alabama	3	–	5	3	–	8
Championship: Florida 28, Auburn 6
$ – BCS representative as conference champion; x – Division champion/co-champions; Rankings from AP Poll

The 2000 Georgia Bulldogs football team represented the University of Georgia as a member of the Southeastern Conference during the 2000 NCAA Division I-A football season. In their fifth and final year under head coach Jim Donnan, the Bulldogs compiled an overall record of 8–4 record with a mark of 5–3 in conference play, placing third in the SEC's Eastern Division. Georgia was invited to the Oahu Bowl, where the Bulldogs defeated Virginia. The team played home games at Sanford Stadium in Athens, Georgia.

== Schedule ==
Date	Time	Opponent	Rank	Site	TV	Result	Attendance	Source
September 2	6:00 p.m.	Georgia Southern*	No. 11	Sanford Stadium; Athens, GA	PPV	W 29–7	86,520	
September 9	3:30 p.m.	at South Carolina	No. 10	Williams–Brice Stadium; Columbia, SC (rivalry)	ESPN2	L 10–21	83,605	
September 23	1:00 p.m.	New Mexico State*	No. 24	Sanford Stadium; Athens, GA		W 37–0	85,202	
September 30	12:30 p.m.	at Arkansas	No. 24	Razorback Stadium; Fayetteville, AR	JPS	W 38–7	51,162	
October 7	7:00 p.m.	No. 21 Tennessee	No. 19	Sanford Stadium; Athens, GA (rivalry)	ESPN	W 21–10	86,520	
October 14	1:00 p.m.	Vanderbilt^{†}	No. 13	Sanford Stadium; Athens, GA (rivalry)		W 29–19	86,520	
October 21	12:30 p.m.	at Kentucky	No. 12	Commonwealth Stadium; Lexington, KY	JPS	W 34–30	68,565	
October 28	3:30 p.m.	vs. No. 8 Florida	No. 12	Alltel Stadium; Jacksonville, FL (rivalry)	CBS	L 23–34	84,404	
November 11	7:30 p.m.	at No. 22 Auburn	No. 13	Jordan-Hare Stadium; Auburn, AL (Deep South's Oldest Rivalry)	ESPN	L 26–29 ^{OT}	85,612	
November 18	6:00 p.m.	Ole Miss	No. 21	Sanford Stadium; Athens, GA	ESPN2	W 32–14	76,248	
November 25	12:00 p.m.	No. 18 Georgia Tech*	No. 19	Sanford Stadium; Athens, GA (Clean, Old-Fashioned Hate)	CBS	L 15–27	85,912	
December 24	8:30 p.m.	vs. Virginia*	No. 24	Aloha Stadium; Halawa, HI (Oahu Bowl)	ESPN	W 37–14	24,187	
*Non-conference game; ^{†}Homecoming; Rankings from AP Poll released prior to the game; All times are in Eastern time

== Rankings ==
Ranking movements Legend: ██ Increase in ranking ██ Decrease in ranking — = Not ranked
	Week																
Poll	Pre	1	2	3	4	5	6	7	8	9	10	11	12	13	14	15	Final
AP	10	10	9	23	24	25	19	14	12	13	17	14	22	19	24	24	20
Coaches	11	11	10	22	24	24	19	13	12	12	17	13	21	18	24	24	17
BCS	Not released									12	—	—	—	—	—	—	Not released

== Personnel ==
=== Roster ===
2000 Georgia Bulldogs football team roster
Players
Coaches
**Offense**

Pos.	#	Name	Class
OL	70	Kevin Breedlove	So
WR	1	Reggie Brown	Fr
QB	17	Labrone Mitchell	Jr
WR	8	Terrence Edwards	So
OT	71	George Foster	So
RB	35	Verron Haynes	Jr
OT	75	Jonas Jennings	Sr
QB	6	Sean Jones	Fr
TE	86	Randy McMichael	Jr
OT	78	Jon Stinchcomb	So

**Defense**

Pos.	#	Name	Class
LB	45	Boss Bailey	So
LB	37	Kendrell Bell	Sr
SS	15	Terreal Bierria	So
DE	92	Demetric Evans	Sr
LB	42	Tony Gilbert	So
LB	19	Charles Grant	So
CB	31	Jamie Henderson	Sr
DT	98	Josh Mallard	Jr
DT	93	Richard Seymour	Sr
DT	97	Marcus Stroud	Sr
DT	57	Johnathan Sullivan	Fr
CB	2	Tim Wansley	Jr
MLB	46	Will Witherspoon	Jr

**Special teams**

Pos.	#	Name	Class

Head coach

- Jim Donnan

Coordinators/assistant coaches

- Gary Gibbs (defensive coordinator / linebackers)
- Greg Adkins (offensive line / tight ends)
- Phil Jones (defensive ends)
- Rodney Garner (defensive line / recruiting coordinator)
- Brad Lambert (secondary)
- Doug Marrone (offensive line)
- Leon Perry (running backs)
- Greg Williams (wide receivers)
- Todd Donnan (quarterbacks)
- Mark D'Onofrio (graduate assistant)
- Eric Fears (director of strength and conditioning)
- Keith Gray (assistant strength and conditioning)
- Steve Greer (director of football operations)
- Mark Krichbaum (assistant strength and conditioning)
- John Power (program coordinator)
- John Segrave (graduate assistant)
- Joe Tereshinski (video coordinator and assistant strength and conditioning)

Legend

- **(C)** Team captain
- **(S)** Suspended
- **(I)** Ineligible
- Injured
- Redshirt

Roster

=== Depth chart ===
Offense
QB	**Quincy Carter**	6-3	223	Jr.	Corey Phillips	6-0	200	So.
RB	**Jasper Sanks**	6-0	216	Jr.	Brett Millican	5-11	197	Sr.
RB	Bruce Thornton	5-10	188	Fr.	Kenny Bailey	5-11	192	Fr.
WR	**Terrance Edwards**	6-2	175	So.	LaBrone Mitchell	6-1	203	Jr.
WR	**Michael Greer**	5-10	170	Sr.	Durell Robinson	6-2	200	So.
T	**Jonas Jennings**	6-4	302	Sr.	Alex Jackson	6-4	318	So.
G	Brady Pate	6-5	273	Sr.	Reggie Stargill	6-3	281	Sr.
C	Curt McGill	6-3	273	Jr.	Brady Pate	6-5	273	Sr.
G	**Kevin Breedlove**	6-4	310	So.	Reggie Stargill	6-3	281	Sr.
T	**Jon Stinchcomb**	6-5	272	So.	George Foster	6-5	302	So.
TE	**Jevaris Johnson**	6-6	258	Sr.	Randy McMichael	6-3	223	So.
K	Brett Kirouac	6-1	191	So.				
**Returning starters in bold.**

Defense
DE	**Charles Grant**	6-3	266	So.	Demetric Evans	6-3	275	Sr.
DT	**Richard Seymour**	6-6	295	Sr.	Tyrone Robertson	6-4	287	So.
DT	**Marcus Stroud**	6-6	300	Sr.	David Jacobs	6-4	258	So.
DE	**Bruce Adrine**	6-4	258	Jr.	Terin Smith	6-3	234	Jr.
SLB	**Boss Bailey**	6-3	220	Jr.	Jessie Miller	6-2	217	So.
MLB	**Kendrell Bell**	6-2	240	Sr.	Adrian Hollingshed	6-2	234	Jr.
WLB	Will Witherspoon	6-1	215	Jr.	Tony Gilbert	6-0	227	So.
CB	**Jamie Henderson**	6-2	190	Sr.	Cory Robinson	5-11	191	Sr.
CB	**Tim Wansley**	5-8	179	Jr.	Decory Bryant	5-11	179	Fr.
SS	**Terreal Bierria**	6-3	215	So.	Jermaine Phillips	6-2	202	Sr.
FS	**Cap Burnett**	6-1	202	So.	Kentrell Curry	6-1	188	Fr.
P	**Wynn Kopp**	5-9	162	Jr.	Jonathan Kilgo	6-2	200	So.
**Returning starters in bold.**
