= 2000 Mississippi State Bulldogs football team =

American college football season

2000 Mississippi State Bulldogs football

Independence Bowl champion

Independence Bowl, W 43–41 ^{OT} vs. Texas A&M
- Conference: Southeastern Conference
- Western Division

Ranking
- Coaches: No. 22
- AP: No. 24
- Record: 8–4 (4–4 SEC)
- Head coach: Jackie Sherrill (10th season)
- Offensive coordinator: Sparky Woods (2nd season)
- Offensive scheme: Multiple I formation
- Defensive coordinator: Joe Lee Dunn (5th season)
- Base defense: 3–3 stack
- Home stadium: Scott Field

2000 Southeastern Conference football standings
	Conf.			Overall
Team	W		L	W		L
Eastern Division
No. 10 Florida x$	7	–	1	10	–	3
No. 19 South Carolina	5	–	3	8	–	4
No. 20 Georgia	5	–	3	8	–	4
Tennessee	5	–	3	8	–	4
Vanderbilt	1	–	7	3	–	8
Kentucky	0	–	8	2	–	9
Western Division
No. 18 Auburn x	6	–	2	9	–	4
No. 22 LSU	5	–	3	8	–	4
Ole Miss	4	–	4	7	–	5
No. 24 Mississippi State	4	–	4	8	–	4
Arkansas	3	–	5	6	–	6
Alabama	3	–	5	3	–	8
Championship: Florida 28, Auburn 6
$ – BCS representative as conference champion; x – Division champion/co-champions; Rankings from AP Poll

The 2000 Mississippi State Bulldogs football team represented Mississippi State University as a member of the Western Division of the Southern Conference (SEC) during the 2000 NCAA Division I-A football season. Led by tenth-year head coach Jackie Sherrill, the Bulldogs compiled an overall record of 8–4 with a mark of 4–4 in conference play, tying for third place in the SEC's Western Division. Mississippi State was invited to the Independence Bowl, where Bulldogs defeated Texas A&M in overtime. The team played home games at Scott Field in Starkville, Mississippi.

== Schedule ==
Date	Time	Opponent	Rank	Site	TV	Result	Attendance	Source
September 2	2:30 pm	at Memphis*		Liberty Bowl Memorial Stadium; Memphis, TN	FSN	W 17–3	34,113	
September 14	7:00 pm	at BYU*		Cougar Stadium; Provo, UT	ESPN	W 44–28	60,278	
September 23	11:30 am	at South Carolina	No. 25	Williams–Brice Stadium; Columbia, SC	JPS	L 19–23	79,949	
September 30	2:30 pm	No. 3 Florida		Scott Field; Starkville, MS	CBS	W 47–35	43,816	
October 7	2:30 pm	No. 15 Auburn	No. 20	Scott Field; Starkville, MS	CBS	W 17–10	43,917	
October 21	8:00 pm	at LSU	No. 13	Tiger Stadium; Baton Rouge, Louisiana (rivalry)	ESPN2	L 38–45 ^{OT}	90,584	
October 28	1:30 pm	Middle Tennessee*^{†}	No. 20	Scott Field; Starkville, MS		W 61–35	42,933	
November 4	12:30 pm	at Kentucky	No. 18	Commonwealth Stadium; Lexington, KY	PPV	W 35–17	62,159	
November 11	11:30 am	Alabama	No. 15	Scott Field; Starkville, MS (rivalry)	JPS	W 29–7	44,114	
November 18	1:00 pm	Arkansas	No. 13	Scott Field; Starkville, MS		L 10–17 ^{OT}	40,010	
November 23	7:00 pm	at Ole Miss	No. 23	Vaught–Hemingway Stadium; Oxford, MS (Egg Bowl)	ESPN	L 30–45	48,811	
December 31	7:00 pm	vs. Texas A&M*		Independence Stadium; Shreveport, LA (Independence Bowl)	ESPN	W 43–41 ^{OT}	36,974	
*Non-conference game; ^{†}Homecoming; Rankings from AP Poll released prior to the game; All times are in Central time

== Rankings ==
Ranking movements Legend: ██ Increase in ranking ██ Decrease in ranking — = Not ranked
	Week																
Poll	Pre	1	2	3	4	5	6	7	8	9	10	11	12	13	14	15	Final
AP	—	—	—	—	25	—	20	15	13	20	18	15	13	23	—	—	24
Coaches Poll	—	—	—	—	25	—	20	14	14	21	18	16	13	23	—	—	22
BCS	Not released									—	—	—	12	—	—	—	Not released
