= Jasper Sanks =

American football player (born 1978)

Personal information
- Full name: Jasper Cantrell Sanks
- Born: May 30, 1978 (age 48) Columbus, Georgia
- Education: Carver High School, Fork Union Military Academy(Prep School), University of Georgia
- Height: 6 ft 1 in (185 cm)
- Weight: 237 lb (108 kg)
- Spouse: Kristine Keese

Sport
- Sport: Football
- University team: Georgia Bulldogs football
- Updated on 1 May 2016

Jasper Sanks is a Georgia-born football player. After Herschel Walker, he remains the most highly recruited signee in the history of Georgia football. As a senior at Carver High School, he was named the top offensive prospect in the entire country by The National Recruiting Advisor. But in college, Sanks was kicked off the team for violating the Bulldogs’ three-strikes drug policy, ending a promising career in professional football. As a result of that, Sanks was not drafted, nor did he even have a free-agent tryout with an NFL team. A documentary titled Inches Away is being made about his career and choices.

== Biography ==
Jasper Sanks was born to Joe and Jeanette Sanks in 1978 in Columbus, Georgia. He went to Carver High School, for academic reasons he was forced to attend Fork Union Military Academy in 1997. He spent the next four years at University of Georgia where he majored in education. After college, he worked as an engineer handling explosives for Pro Oil Fields an oil company in Houston, Texas. He received a bachelor of science degree in management from the University of Phoenix in 2006. He married UGA volleyball player, Kristine Keese who lettered from the university the same year as him. They together have two daughters.

In 2008, his twin brother Jarvis Sanks was shot dead. All the three accused were indicted on charges of the deaths of Jarvis Sanks.

== Career ==
=== High school and prep school ===
In 1996 during his high school days, he set a school record with 5,043 career rushing yards. He also kicked a school-record 48-yard field goal. Sanks was named in All-USA first team by USA Today. Atlanta Journal-Constitution named him in Super Southern 100, top 50 in Georgia and First Team class AAAA All-State. Fox Sports named him All-South player of the year. He was invited to play in the 1997 Georgia North-South All-Star Game. In prep school, he was named most valuable offensive player.

=== College ===
In 1998 during his freshmen year, Sanks underwent hernia surgery. He was out most of the season due to his injuries. He played only two games as a backup running back. In 1999, he led the team in rushing with 896 yards on 177 carries. He started at right back in Georgia's 28–25 come-from-behind overtime victory over Purdue in the Outback Bowl, the biggest comeback in bowl history (from 25-0 deficit). In the year 2000, he was again the team's leading rusher. In 2001. he missed most of the games due to right knee sprain. He was also kicked off the team towards the end of his senior season for receiving a third strike against UGA’s marijuana-use policy.

During his sophomore year, in the Georgia-Georgia Tech game, the seven-man crew of referees ruled that Sanks fumbled at the 1-yard line in the final seconds of the game. Television replays showed that the ball popped out after Sanks hit the ground. The score was 48–48 when the ball was awarded to Tech. Georgia Tech won 51–48 in overtime.

== Documentary ==
A documentary about his life titled Inches Away was expected to be released in 2016. The movie is directed by Will Santana.
