= Lorenzo Diamond =

American football player (born 1979)

No. 40, 82, 87
- Position: Tight end

Personal information
- Born: December 15, 1979 (age 46); Biloxi, Mississippi, U.S.
- Listed height: 6 ft 3 in (1.91 m)
- Listed weight: 260 lb (118 kg)

Career information
- High school: Biloxi
- College: Auburn
- NFL draft: 2003: undrafted

Career history
- Arizona Cardinals (2003–2004); Miami Dolphins (2005)

Career NFL statistics
- Receptions: 11
- Receiving yards: 73
- Touchdowns: 0
- Stats at Pro Football Reference

Lorenzo Diamond (born 15 December 1979, in Biloxi, Mississippi) is an American former professional football player who was a tight end in the National Football League (NFL). He played college football for the Auburn Tigers and was signed by the Arizona Cardinals as an undrafted free agent in 2003.

== Early life ==
Diamond is from Biloxi, Mississippi. He played college football at Auburn University.

== Professional career ==
Diamond played for the Miami Dolphins. He recorded 11 receptions in 21 career games. He also played for Arizona Cardinals during 2003–2004.
