= 2000 NCAA Division I-A football rankings =

- Season: 2000
- Bowl season: 2000–01 bowl games
- Preseason No. 1: Nebraska
- End of season champions: Oklahoma
- Conference with most teams in final AP poll: SEC (6)

Two human polls and one formulaic ranking make up the 2000 NCAA Division I-A football rankings. Unlike most sports, college football's governing body, the National Collegiate Athletic Association (NCAA), does not bestow a National Championship title for Division I-A football. That title is primarily bestowed by different polling agencies. There are several polls that currently exist. The main weekly polls are the AP Poll and Coaches Poll. About halfway through the season the Bowl Championship Series (BCS) standings are released.

== Legend ==
	Increase in ranking
	Decrease in ranking
	Not ranked previous week
	Selected for BCS National Championship Game
(#–#)	Win–loss record
(Italics)	Number of first place votes
т	Tied with team above or below also with this symbol

== AP Poll ==
	Preseason Aug 6	Week 1 Aug 27	Week 2 Sep 3	Week 3 Sep 10	Week 4 Sep 17	Week 5 Sep 24	Week 6 Oct 1	Week 7 Oct 8	Week 8 Oct 15	Week 9 Oct 22	Week 10 Oct 29	Week 11 Nov 5	Week 12 Nov 12	Week 13 Nov 19	Week 14 Nov 26	Week 15 Dec 3	Week 16 (Final) Jan 3	
1.	Nebraska (36)	Nebraska (0–0) (35)	Nebraska (1–0) (39)	Nebraska (2–0) (41)	Nebraska (2–0) (43)	Nebraska (3–0) (39)	Florida State (5–0) (42)	Nebraska (5–0) (67)	Nebraska (6–0) (66)	Nebraska (7–0) (67)	Oklahoma (7–0) (69)	Oklahoma (8–0) (70)	Oklahoma (9–0) (70)	Oklahoma (10–0) (70)	Oklahoma (11–0) (64)	Oklahoma (12–0)	Oklahoma (13–0) (71)	1.
2.	Florida State (29)	Florida State (1–0) (30)	Florida State (1–0) (28)	Florida State (2–0) (26)	Florida State (3–0) (26)	Florida State (4–0) (30)	Nebraska (4–0) (28)	Kansas State (6–0) (3)	Virginia Tech (6–0) (1)	Virginia Tech (7–0)	Virginia Tech (8–0)	Miami (FL) (7–1)	Miami (FL) (8–1)	Miami (FL) (9–1)	Miami (FL) (10–1) (6)	Miami (FL) (10–1) (3)	Miami (FL) (11–1)	2.
3.	Alabama (3)	Alabama (0–0) (3)	Michigan (1–0)	Michigan (2–0) (1)	Florida (3–0)	Florida (4–0) (1)	Virginia Tech (4–0)	Virginia Tech (5–0) (1)	Oklahoma (6–0) (4)	Oklahoma (6–0) (3)	Miami (FL) (6–1)	Florida State (9–1) (1)	Florida State (10–1)	Florida State (11–1) (1)	Florida State (11–1) (1)	Florida State (11–1) (1)	Washington (11–1)	3.
4.	Wisconsin (1)	Wisconsin (0–0) (1)	Miami (FL) (1–0)	Wisconsin (2–0) (1)	Kansas State (3–0) (1)	Virginia Tech (3–0)	Kansas State (5–0) (1)	Miami (FL) (4–1)	Miami (FL) (4–1)	Miami (FL) (5–1)	Florida State (8–1) (1)	Nebraska (8–1)	Florida (9–1)	Washington (10–1)	Washington (10–1)	Washington (10–1)	Oregon State (11–1)	4.
5.	Miami (FL)	Miami (FL) (0–0)	Wisconsin (1–0) (1)	Texas (1–0) (2)	Virginia Tech (3–0)	Kansas State (4–0) (1)	Clemson (5–0)	Clemson (6–0)	Clemson (7–0)	Clemson (8–0)	Nebraska (7–1)	Florida (8–1)	Oregon (9–1)	Oregon State (10–1)	Oregon State (10–1)	Oregon State (10–1)	Florida State (11–2)	5.
6.	Michigan	Michigan (0–0)	Texas (0–0) (2)	Florida (2–0)	UCLA (3–0) (1)	Washington (3–0)	Michigan (4–1)	Ohio State (5–0)	Florida State (6–1)	Florida State (7–1)	Florida (7–1)	Oregon (8–1)	Washington (9–1)	Virginia Tech (9–1)	Virginia Tech (10–1)	Virginia Tech (10–1)	Virginia Tech (11–1)	6.
7.	Texas (1)	Texas (0–0) (2)	Kansas State (2–0)	Kansas State (2–0)	Wisconsin (3–0)	Clemson (4–0)	Miami (FL) (3–1)	Florida State (5–1)	Oregon (5–1)	Oregon (6–1)	Oregon (7–1)	Washington (8–1)	Virginia Tech (9–1)	Florida (9–2)	Florida (9–2)	Florida (10–2)	Oregon (10-2)	7.
8.	Kansas State	Kansas State (1–0)	Florida (1–0)	Virginia Tech (2–0)	Washington (3–0)	USC (3–0)	Ohio State (4–0)	Oklahoma (5–0)	Florida (6–1)	Florida (6–1)	Washington (7–1)	Virginia Tech (8–1)	Oregon State (9–1)	Kansas State (10–2)	Kansas State (10–2)	Oregon (9–2)	Nebraska (10–2)	8.
9.	Florida	Florida (0–0)	Georgia (1–0)	Washington (2–0)	USC (2–0)	Michigan (3–1)	Oregon (4–1)	Oregon (4–1)	Washington (5–1)	Washington (6–1)	TCU (7–0)	Purdue (7–2)	Kansas State (9–2)	Nebraska (8–2)	Oregon (9–2)	Nebraska (9–2)	Kansas State (11–3)	9.
10.	Georgia	Georgia (0–0)	Virginia Tech (1–0)	USC (2–0)	Michigan (2–1)	Miami (FL) (2–1)	Oklahoma (4–0)	Florida (5–1)	Kansas State (6–1)	Kansas State (7–1)	Clemson (8–1)	Oregon State (8–1)	Nebraska (8–2)	Oregon (9–2)	Nebraska (9–2)	Notre Dame (9–2)	Florida (10–3)	10.
11.	Virginia Tech	Virginia Tech (0–0)	USC (1–0)	Tennessee (1–0)	Clemson (3–0)	Tennessee (2–1)	Texas (3–1)	Washington (4–1)	TCU (5–0)	TCU (6–0)	Purdue (7–2)	Notre Dame (6–2)	Notre Dame (7–2)	Notre Dame (8–2)	Notre Dame (9–2)	Kansas State (10–3)	Michigan (9–3)	11.
12.	Tennessee	USC (1–0)	Tennessee (1–0)	Miami (FL) (1–1)	Miami (FL) (1–1)	Ohio State (4–0)	Florida (4–1)	TCU (5–0)	Georgia (5–1)	Ohio State (6–1)	Michigan (6–2)	Northwestern (7–2)	Ohio State (8–2)	Texas (8–2)	Texas (9–2)	Texas (9–2)	Texas (9–3)	12.
13.	Washington	Tennessee (0–0)	Alabama (0–1)	Purdue (2–0)	Tennessee (1–1)	Texas (2–1)	Washington (3–1)	UCLA (4–1)	Mississippi State (4–1)	Georgia (6–1)	Southern Miss (6–1)	Ohio State (7–2)	Mississippi State (7–2)	TCU (9–1)	TCU (10–1)	TCU (10–1)	Purdue (8–4)	13.
14.	Purdue	Washington (0–0)	Purdue (1–0)	UCLA (2–0)	Ohio State (3–0)	Oklahoma (3–0)	TCU (4–0)	Georgia (4–1)	Ohio State (5–1)	Southern Miss (5–1)	Oregon State (7–1)	Georgia (6–2)	Texas (8–2)	Purdue (8–3)	Purdue (8–3)	Purdue (8–3)	Colorado State (10–2)	14.
15.	USC	Purdue (0–0)	Washington (1–0)	Alabama (1–1)	Texas (1–1)	UCLA (3–1)	Auburn (5–0)	Mississippi State (4–1)	Southern Miss(5–1)	Michigan (6–2)	Notre Dame (6–2)	Mississippi State (6–2)	TCU (8–1)	Clemson (9–2)	Clemson (9–2)	Georgia Tech (9–2)	Notre Dame (9–3)	15.
16.	Ohio State	Ohio State (0–0)	UCLA (1–0) (1)	Clemson (2–0)	Notre Dame (2–1)	TCU (3–0)	UCLA (4–1)	Southern Miss (4–1)	Michigan (5–2)	Purdue (6–2)	Ohio State (6–2)	Kansas State (8–2)	Clemson (8–2)	Michigan (8–3)	Michigan (8–3)	Clemson (9–2)	Clemson (9–3)	16.
17.	Clemson	Clemson (0–0)	Clemson (1–0)	Ohio State (2–0)	Oklahoma (2–0)	Wisconsin (3–1)	Southern Miss (3–1)	Northwestern (5–1)	Purdue (5–2)	South Carolina (7–1)	Georgia (6–2)	Clemson (8–2)	Purdue (7–3)	Auburn (9–2)	Georgia Tech (9–2)	Michigan (8–3)	Georgia Tech (9–3)	17.
18.	Ole Miss	Ole Miss (0–0)	Ohio State (1–0)	Oklahoma (2–0)	TCU (2–0)	Michigan State (3–0)	USC (3–1)	Michigan (4–2)	South Carolina (6–1)	Oregon State (6–1)	Mississippi State (5–2)	TCU (7–1)	Auburn (8–2)	Georgia Tech (8–2)	Auburn (9–2)	Northwestern (8–3)	Auburn (9–4)	18.
19.	Oklahoma	Oklahoma (0–0)	Ole Miss (1–0)	Illinois (2–0)	Illinois (3–0)	Auburn (4–0)	Georgia (3–1)	Auburn (5–1)	Oregon State (5–1)	Notre Dame (5–2)	Kansas State (7–2)	Texas (7–2)	Michigan (7–3)	Georgia (7–3)	Northwestern (8–3)	Ohio State (8–3)	South Carolina (8–4)	19.
20.	TCU	TCU (0–0)	Oklahoma (1–0)	TCU (1–0)	Auburn (3–0)	Oregon (3–1)	Mississippi State (3–1)	Notre Dame (3–2)	Notre Dame (4–2)	Mississippi State (4–2)	Texas (6–2)	Michigan (6–3)	Georgia Tech (7–2)	Northwestern (8–3)	Ohio State (8–3)	Auburn (9–3)	Georgia (8–4)	20.
21.	Illinois	Illinois (0–0)	Illinois (1–0)	Notre Dame (1–1)	Purdue (2–1)	Southern Miss (2–1)	Tennessee (2–2)	Purdue (4–2)	Arizona (5–1)	NC State (5–1)	Northwestern (6–2)	South Carolina (7–2)	Texas A&M (7–3)	Ohio State (8–3)	Tennessee (8–3)	Tennessee (8–3)	TCU (10–2)	21.
22.	Penn State	Southern Miss (0–0)	TCU (0–0)	Michigan State (1–0)	Southern Miss (1–1)	Purdue (3–1)	Northwestern (4–1)	Arizona (4–1)	Minnesota (5–2)	Texas (5–2)	South Carolina (7–2)	Auburn (7–2)	Georgia (6–3)	Texas A&M (7–3)	Louisville (9–2)	Louisville (9–2)	LSU (8–4)	22.
23.	Southern Miss	Colorado (0–0)	Notre Dame (1–0)	Georgia (1–1)	Michigan State (2–0)	South Carolina (4–0)	Oregon State (4–0)	Oregon State (4–1)	UCLA (4–2)	Northwestern (5–2)	Auburn (7–2)	Texas A&M (7–2)	Northwestern (7–3)	Mississippi State (7–3)	Colorado State (9–2)	Colorado State (9–2)	Wisconsin (9–4)	23.
24.	Colorado	Michigan State (0–0)	Michigan State (0–0)	Auburn (2–0)	Georgia (1–1)	Illinois (3–1)	Wisconsin (3–2)	South Carolina (5–1)	NC State (5–1)	Arizona (5–2)	Texas A&M (6–2)	Georgia Tech (6–2)	Southern Miss (7–2)	LSU (7–3)	Georgia (7–4)	Georgia (7–4)	Mississippi State (8–4)	24.
25.	Michigan State	Texas A&M (0–0)	Southern Miss (0–1)	Southern Miss (0–1)	Mississippi State (2–0)	Georgia (2–1)	Notre Dame (2–2)	Texas (3–2)	Northwestern (5–2)	Auburn (6–2)	Georgia Tech (6–2)	Southern Miss (6–2)	South Carolina (7–3)	Tennessee (7–3)	Toledo (10–1)	Toledo (10–1)	Iowa State (9–3)	25.
	Preseason Aug 6	Week 1 Aug 27	Week 2 Sep 3	Week 3 Sep 10	Week 4 Sep 17	Week 5 Sep 24	Week 6 Oct 1	Week 7 Oct 8	Week 8 Oct 15	Week 9 Oct 22	Week 10 Oct 29	Week 11 Nov 5	Week 12 Nov 12	Week 13 Nov 19	Week 14 Nov 26	Week 15 Dec 3	Week 16 (Final) Jan 3	
		Dropped: Penn State	Dropped: Colorado; Texas A&M	Dropped: Ole Miss	Dropped: Alabama	Dropped: Notre Dame; Mississippi State	Dropped: Michigan State; Purdue; South Carolina; Illinois	Dropped: USC; Tennessee; Wisconsin	Dropped: Auburn; Texas	Dropped: Minnesota; UCLA	Dropped: NC State; Arizona	None	None	Dropped: Southern Miss; South Carolina	Dropped: Texas A&M; Mississippi State; LSU	None	Dropped: Louisville; Northwestern; Ohio State; Tennessee; Toledo	

== Coaches Poll ==
	Preseason Aug 11	Week 1 Aug 29	Week 2 Sep 5	Week 3 Sep 11	Week 4 Sep 18	Week 5 Sep 25	Week 6 Oct 2	Week 7 Oct 9	Week 8 Oct 16	Week 9 Oct 23	Week 10 Oct 30	Week 11 Nov 6	Week 12 Nov 13	Week 13 Nov 20	Week 14 Nov 27	Week 15 Dec 4	Week 16 (Final) Jan 5	
1.	Nebraska (36)	Nebraska (0–0) (40)	Nebraska (1–0) (43)	Nebraska (2–0) (48)	Nebraska (2–0) (44)	Nebraska (3–0) (44)	Nebraska (4–0) (37)	Nebraska (5–0) (53)	Nebraska (6–0) (57)	Nebraska (7–0) (58)	Oklahoma (7–0) (55)	Oklahoma (8–0) (58)	Oklahoma (9–0) (57)	Oklahoma (10–0) (56)	Oklahoma (11–0) (49)	Oklahoma (12–0) (56)	Oklahoma (13–0) (59)	1.
2.	Florida State (21)	Florida State (1–0) (17)	Florida State (1–0) (15)	Florida State (2–0) (10)	Florida State (3–0) (14)	Florida State (4–0) (14)	Florida State (5–0) (21)	Virginia Tech (5–0) (3)	Virginia Tech (6–0) (1)	Virginia Tech (7–0)	Virginia Tech (8–0) (4)	Miami (FL) (7–1) (1)	Miami (FL) (8–1) (2)	Miami (FL) (9–1) (2)	Miami (FL) (10–1) (5)	Miami (FL) (10–1) (2)	Miami (FL) (11–1)	2.
3.	Alabama (1)	Alabama (0–0) (1)	Michigan (1–0)	Michigan (2–0)	Florida (3–0)	Florida (4–0)	Virginia Tech (4–0)	Kansas State (6–0) (3)	Clemson (7–0)	Oklahoma (6–0) (1)	Miami (FL) (6–1)	Florida State (9–1)	Florida State (10–1)	Florida State (11–1) (1)	Florida State (11–1) (5)	Florida State (11–1) (1)	Washington (11–1)	3.
4.	Michigan	Michigan (0–0)	Miami (FL) (1–0)	Florida (2–0)	Virginia Tech (3–0) (1)	Virginia Tech (3–0)	Kansas State (5–0) (1)	Clemson (6–0)	Oklahoma (6–0) (1)	Clemson (8–0)	Florida State (8–1)	Florida (8–1)	Florida (9–1)	Washington (10–1)	Washington (10–1)	Washington (10–1)	Florida State (11–2)	4.
5.	Wisconsin (1)	Wisconsin (0–0) (1)	Florida (1–0)	Wisconsin (2–0) (1)	Kansas State (3–0)	Kansas State (4–0) (1)	Clemson (5–0)	Ohio State (5–0)	Miami (FL) (4–1)	Miami (FL) (5–1)	Florida (7–1)	Nebraska (8–1)	Washington (9–1)	Virginia Tech (9–1)	Virginia Tech (10–1)	Virginia Tech (10–1)	Oregon State (11–1)	5.
6.	Miami (FL)	Miami (FL) (0–0)	Wisconsin (1–0) (1)	Texas (1–0)	Wisconsin (3–0)	Washington (3–0)	Michigan (4–1)	Miami (FL) (4–1)	Florida State (6–1)	Florida State (7–1)	Nebraska (7–1)	Washington (8–1)	Oregon (9–1)	Oregon State (10–1)	Oregon State (10–1)	Oregon State (10–1)	Virginia Tech (11–1)	6.
7.	Florida	Florida (0–0)	Kansas State (2–0)	Kansas State (2–0)	Washington (3–0)	USC (3–0)	Ohio State (4–0)	Florida State (5–1)	Florida (6–1)	Florida (6–1)	Washington (7–1)	Oregon (8–1)	Virginia Tech (9–1)	Kansas State (10–2)	Kansas State (10–2)	Florida (10–2)	Nebraska (10–2)	7.
8.	Texas	Texas (0–0)	Texas (0–0)	Virginia Tech (2–0)	UCLA (3–0)	Clemson (4–0)	Miami (FL) (3–1)	Oklahoma (5–0)	Kansas State (6–1)	Kansas State (7–1)	Oregon (7–1)	Virginia Tech (8–1)	Oregon State (9–1)	Nebraska (8–2)	Florida (9–2)	Nebraska (9–2)	Kansas State (11–3)	8.
9.	Kansas State	Kansas State (1–0)	Virginia Tech (1–0)	Tennessee (1–0)	USC (2–0)	Michigan (3–1)	Florida (4–1)	Florida (5–1)	Washington (6–1)	Washington (6–1)	TCU (7–0)	Purdue (7–2)	Kansas State (9–2)	Florida (9–2)	Nebraska (9–2)	Kansas State (10–3)	Oregon (10–2)	9.
10.	Virginia Tech	Virginia Tech (0–0)	Georgia (1–0)	Washington (2–0)	Michigan (2–1)	Ohio State (4–0)	Texas (3–1)	Washington (4–1)	TCU (5–0)	Oregon (6–1)	Clemson (8–1)	Oregon State (8–1)	Nebraska (8–2)	Notre Dame (8–2)	Notre Dame (9–2)	Notre Dame (9–2)	Michigan (9–3)	10.
11.	Georgia	Georgia (0–0)	Tennessee (1–0)	USC (2–0)	Clemson (3–0)	Tennessee (2–1)	Washington (3–1)	TCU (5–0)	Oregon (5–1)	TCU (6–0)	Southern Miss (6–1)	Kansas State (8–2)	Notre Dame (7–2)	Oregon (9–2)	Oregon (9–2)	Oregon (9–2)	Florida (10–3)	11.
12.	Tennessee	Tennessee (0–0)	USC (1–0)	Purdue (2–0)	Ohio State (3–0)	Miami (FL) (2–1)	Oklahoma (4–0)	Oregon (4–1)	Georgia (5–1)	Georgia (6–1)	Michigan (6–2)	Notre Dame (6–2)	Ohio State (8–2)	Clemson (9–2)	Texas (9–2)	Texas (9–2)	Texas (9–3)	12.
13.	Purdue	USC (1–0)	Purdue (1–0)	Alabama (1–1)	Tennessee (1–1)	Texas (2–1)	Auburn (5–0)	Georgia (4–1)	Ohio State (5–1)	Ohio State (6–1)	Purdue (7–2)	Georgia (6–2)	Mississippi State (7–2)	Texas (8–2)	Clemson (9–2)	Clemson (9–2)	Purdue (8–4)	13.
14.	Washington	Purdue (0–0)	Alabama (0–1)	Miami (FL) (1–1)	Miami (FL) (1–1)	Wisconsin (3–1)	TCU (4–0)	Mississippi State (4–1)	Mississippi State (4–1)	Southern Miss (5–1)	Oregon State (7–1)	Ohio State (7–2)	Clemson (8–2)	Purdue (8–3)	Purdue (8–3)	Purdue (8–3)	Clemson (9–3)	14.
15.	Ohio State	Washington (0–0)	Washington (1–0)	Ohio State (2–0)	Texas (1–1)	Michigan State (3–0)	Oregon (4–1)	UCLA (4–1)	Southern Miss (5–1)	Michigan (6–2)	Kansas State (7–2)	Clemson (8–2)	Texas (8–2)	TCU (9–1)	TCU (10–1)	Michigan (8–3)	Colorado State (10–2)	15.
16.	USC	Ohio State (0–0)	Ohio State (1–0)	Clemson (2–0)	Oklahoma (2–0)	Oklahoma (3–0)	USC (3–1)	Southern Miss (4–1)	Michigan (5–2)	Purdue (6–2)	Notre Dame (6–2)	Mississippi State (6–2)	TCU (8–1)	Michigan (8–3)	Michigan (8–3)	TCU (10–1)	Notre Dame (9–3)	16.
17.	Penn State	Ole Miss (0–0)	UCLA (1–0)	UCLA (2–0)	Illinois (3–0)	UCLA (3–1)	UCLA (4–1)	Michigan (4–2)	Purdue (5–2)	Oregon State (6–1)	Georgia (6–2)	TCU (7–1)	Purdue (7–3)	Auburn (9–2)	Auburn (9–2)	Georgia Tech (9–2)	Georgia (8–4)	17.
18.	Ole Miss	Clemson (0–0)	Ole Miss (1–0)	Oklahoma (2–0)	Notre Dame (2–1)	TCU (3–0)	Southern Miss (3–1)	Northwestern (5–1)	Oregon State (5–1)	South Carolina (7–1)	Mississippi State (5–2)	Northwestern (7–2)	Michigan (7–3)	Georgia (7–3)	Georgia Tech (9–2)	Ohio State (8–3)	TCU (10–2)	18.
19.	Clemson	Oklahoma (0–0)	Clemson (1–0)	Illinois (2–0)	TCU (2–0)	Purdue (3–1)	Georgia (3–1)	Auburn (5–1)	South Carolina (6–1)	Notre Dame (5–2)	Ohio State (6–2)	Texas (7–2)	Auburn (8–2)	Georgia Tech (8–2)	Ohio State (8–3)	Northwestern (8–3)	Georgia Tech (9–3)	19.
20.	Oklahoma	Illinois (0–0)	Oklahoma (1–0)	Michigan State (1–0)	Michigan State (2–0)	Auburn (4–0)	Mississippi State (3–1)	Oregon State (4–1)	Arizona (5–1)	Texas (5–2)	Texas (6–2)	Colorado State (8–1)	Southern Miss (7–2)	Ohio State (8–3)	Northwestern (8–3)	Auburn (9–3)	Auburn (9–4)	20.
21.	Illinois	TCU (0–0)	Illinois (1–0)	TCU (1–0)	Purdue (2–1)	Southern Miss (2–1)	Tennessee (2–2)	Purdue (4–2)	Texas (4–2)	Mississippi State (4–2)	Colorado State (7–1)	Michigan (6–3)	Georgia (6–3)	Northwestern (8–3)	Tennessee (8–3)	Tennessee (8–3)	South Carolina (8–4)	21.
22.	Michigan State	Michigan State (0–0)	TCU (0–0)	Georgia (1–1)	Auburn (3–0)	Illinois (3–1)	Wisconsin (3–2)	Arizona (4–1)	Notre Dame (4–2)	NC State (5–1)	Auburn (7–2)	Southern Miss (6–2)	Georgia Tech (7–2)	Texas A&M (7–3)	Colorado State (9–2)	Colorado State (9–2)	Mississippi State (8–4)	22.
23.	TCU	Texas A&M (0–0)	Michigan State (0–0)	Notre Dame (1–1)	Southern Miss (1–1)	South Carolina (4–0)	Oregon State (4–0)	Texas (3–2)	Minnesota (5–2)	Arizona (5–2)	Northwestern (6–2)	Auburn (7–2)	Texas A&M (7–3)	Mississippi State (7–3)	Louisville (9–2)	Louisville (9–2)	Iowa State (9–3)	23.
24.	Texas A&M	Southern Miss (0–0)	Southern Miss (0–1)	Auburn (2–0)	Georgia (1–1)	Georgia (2–1)	Northwestern (4–1)	South Carolina (5–1)	UCLA (4–2)	Colorado State (6–1)	South Carolina (7–2)	Texas A&M (7–2)	Northwestern (7–3)	Tennessee (7–3)	Georgia (7–4)	Georgia (7–4)	Wisconsin (9–4)	24.
25.	Southern Miss	Colorado (0–0)	Notre Dame (1–0)	Colorado State (2–0)	Mississippi State (2–0)	Oregon (3–1)	Michigan State (3–1)	Mississippi (4–1)	NC State (5–1)	Auburn (6–2)	Texas A&M (6–2)	South Carolina (7–2)	Tennessee (6–3)	Colorado State (9–2)	Toledo (10–1)	Toledo (10–1)	Tennessee (8–4)	25.
	Preseason Aug 11	Week 1 Aug 29	Week 2 Sep 5	Week 3 Sep 11	Week 4 Sep 18	Week 5 Sep 25	Week 6 Oct 2	Week 7 Oct 9	Week 8 Oct 16	Week 9 Oct 23	Week 10 Oct 30	Week 11 Nov 6	Week 12 Nov 13	Week 13 Nov 20	Week 14 Nov 27	Week 15 Dec 4	Week 16 (Final) Jan 5	
		Dropped: Penn State	Dropped: Texas A&M; Colorado	Dropped: Ole Miss; Southern Miss	Dropped: Alabama; Colorado State	Dropped: Notre Dame; Mississippi State	Dropped: Purdue; Illinois; South Carolina	Dropped: USC; Tennessee; Wisconsin; Michigan State	Dropped: Northwestern; Auburn; Mississippi	Dropped: Minnesota; UCLA	Dropped: NC State; Arizona	None	Dropped: Colorado State	Dropped: Southern Miss	Dropped: Texas A&M; Mississippi State	None	Dropped: Ohio State; Northwestern; Louisville; Toledo	

== BCS standings ==
The Bowl Championship Series (BCS) determined the two teams that competed in the BCS National Championship Game, the 2001 Orange Bowl.

	Week 9 Oct 23	Week 10 Oct 30	Week 11 Nov 6	Week 12 Nov 13	Week 13 Nov 20	Week 14 Nov 27	Week 15 (Final) Dec 3	
1.	Nebraska (7–0)	Oklahoma (7–0)	Oklahoma (8–0)	Oklahoma (9–0)	Oklahoma (10–0)	Oklahoma (11–0)	Oklahoma (12–0)	1.
2.	Oklahoma (6–0)	Virginia Tech (8–0)	Florida State (9–1)	Miami (FL) (8–1)	Florida State (11–1)	Florida State (11–1)	Florida State (11–1)	2.
3.	Virginia Tech (7–0)	Florida State (8–1)	Miami (FL) (7–1)	Florida State (10–1)	Miami (FL) (9–1)	Miami (FL) (10–1)	Miami (FL) (10–1)	3.
4.	Miami (FL) (5–1)	Nebraska (7–1)	Nebraska (8–1)	Florida (9–1)	Washington (10–1)	Washington (10–1)	Washington (10–1)	4.
5.	Florida State (7–1)	Miami (FL) (6–1)	Florida (8–1)	Washington (9–1)	Oregon State (10–1)	Virginia Tech (10–1)	Virginia Tech (10–1)	5.
6.	Florida (6–1)	Florida (7–1)	Washington (8–1)	Virginia Tech (9–1)	Virginia Tech (9–1)	Oregon State (10–1)	Oregon State (10–1)	6.
7.	Clemson (8–0)	Oregon (7–1)	Oregon (8–1)	Oregon (9–1)	Florida (9–2)	Florida (9–2)	Florida (10–2)	7.
8.	Oregon (6–1)	Washington (7–1)	Virginia Tech (8–1)	Nebraska (8–2)	Nebraska (8–2)	Nebraska (9–2)	Nebraska (9–2)	8.
9.	Washington (6–1)	TCU (7–0)	Oregon State (8–1)	Oregon State (9–1)	Kansas State (10–2)	Kansas State (10–2)	Kansas State (10–3)	9.
10.	Kansas State (7–1)	Purdue (7–2)	Purdue (7–2)	Kansas State (9–2)	Oregon (9–2)	Oregon (9–2)	Oregon (9–2)	10.
11.	Ohio State (6–1)	Oregon State (7–1)	Kansas State (8–2)	Notre Dame (7–2)	Notre Dame (8–2)	Notre Dame (9–2)	Notre Dame (9–2)	11.
12.	Georgia (6–1)	Michigan (6–2)	Notre Dame (6–2)	Mississippi State (7–2)	Texas (8–2)	Texas (9–2)	Texas (9–2)	12.
13.	TCU (6–0)	Clemson (8–1)	Ohio State (7–2)	Ohio State (8–2)	Clemson (9–2)	Georgia Tech (9–2)	Georgia Tech (9–2)	13.
14.	Southern Miss (5–1)	Notre Dame (6–2)	Mississippi State (6–2)	Texas (8–2)	TCU (9–1)	TCU (10–1)	TCU (10–1)	14.
15.	Purdue (6–2)	Mississippi State (5–2)	Northwestern (7–2)	Texas A&M (7–3)	Michigan (8–3)	Clemson (9–2)	Clemson (9–2)	15.
	Week 9 Oct 23	Week 10 Oct 30	Week 11 Nov 6	Week 12 Nov 13	Week 13 Nov 20	Week 14 Nov 27	Week 15 (Final) Dec 3	
		Dropped: Kansas State; Ohio State; Georgia; Southern Miss	Dropped: TCU; Michigan; Clemson	Dropped: Purdue; Northwestern	Dropped: Mississippi State; Ohio State; Texas A&M	Dropped: Michigan	None	

2000 BCS Final Ranking and Bowl Placement
BCS Rank	Team	Human Poll Rank	Computer Poll Rank	Strength of Schedule Rank (Divided by 25 in formula)	Losses	Total BCS Points	Bowl
1	Oklahoma	1.0	1.86	11 (0.52)	0	3.30	Orange - BCS National Championship (as Big 12 Champion and top 2 team)
2	Florida State	3.0	1.29	2 (0.08)	1	5.37	Orange - BCS National Championship (as ACC champion and top 2 team)
3	Miami (Fl)	2.0	2.57	3 (0.12)	1	5.69	Sugar Bowl (as Big East champion)
4	Washington	4.0	5.43	6 (0.24)	1	10.67	Rose Bowl (as Pac-10 champion)
5	Virginia Tech	5.50	5.14	14 (0.56)	1	12.20	No BCS Bowl (Gator)
6	Oregon State	5.50	6.50	42 (1.68)	1	14.68	Fiesta Bowl (as BCS at-large)
7	Florida	7.00	5.71	1 (0.04)	2	14.75	Sugar Bowl (as SEC champion)
8	Nebraska	8.50	7.00	18 (0.72)	2	18.22	No BCS Bowl (Alamo)
9	Kansas State	10.00	10.14	29 (1.16)	3	24.30	No BCS Bowl (Cotton)
10	Oregon	9.50	11.86	24 (0.96)	2	24.32	No BCS Bowl (Holiday)
11	Notre Dame	10.00	12.07	25 (1.00)	2	25.07	Fiesta Bowl (as BCS At-Large)
12	Texas	12.00	9.86	84 (3.36)	2	27.22	No BCS Bowl (Holiday)
13	Georgia Tech	16.00	9.86	44 (1.76)	2	29.62	No BCS Bowl (Peach)
14	TCU	14.50	13.71	96 (3.60)	1	31.01	No BCS Bowl (Mobile, Alabama)
15	Clemson	14.50	13.71	95 (3.80)	2	33.17	No BCS Bowl (Gator)
16	Michigan	16.00	15.00	35 (1.40)	3	35.40	No BCS Bowl (Florida Citrus)
Unranked in BCS	Purdue						Rose Bowl (as Big 10 champion)

BCS Bowl team
No BCS Bowl
