= Troy Andrews =

Troy Andrews may refer to:

- Troy Andrews (basketball) (born 1961), Australian basketball player
- Trombone Shorty (born 1986), American musician

== See also ==
- Troy Andrew, American football player
