= 2001 Gator Bowl =

2001 Toyota Gator Bowl
- 56th Gator Bowl
Clemson Tigers	Virginia Tech Hokies
(9–2)	(10–1)
ACC	Big East
20	41
Head coach: Tommy Bowden	Head coach: Frank Beamer
AP / Coaches / BCS; 16 / 13 / 15	AP / Coaches / BCS; 6 / 5 / 5
	1	2	3	4	Total
Clemson	0	10	3	7	20
Virginia Tech	14	7	13	7	41
- Date: January 1, 2001
- Season: 2000
- Stadium: Alltel Stadium
- Location: Jacksonville, Florida
- MVP: QB Michael Vick (Virginia Tech); WR Rod Gardner (Clemson)
- Favorite: Virginia Tech by 6.5
- Referee: Steve Shaw (SEC)
- Halftime show: The Marching Virginians
- Attendance: 68,741
- Payout: US$3,313,610 (total)

United States TV coverage
- Network: NBC
- Announcers: Matt Vasgersian, Pat Haden, Kip Lewis, Lee Reherman

The 2001 Gator Bowl was a post-season American college football bowl game between the Clemson Tigers and the Virginia Tech Hokies at Alltel Stadium in Jacksonville, Florida on January 1, 2001. The game was the final contest of the 2000 NCAA Division I-A football season for both teams, and ended in a 41–20 victory for Virginia Tech.

Virginia Tech entered the game headed by star quarterback Michael Vick, who led the Hokies to a 10–1 regular-season record despite being injured for a part of the season. Clemson entered the game with a regular-season record of 9–2 under the command of head coach Tommy Bowden, who was in the second year of his tenure. The contest featured two high-scoring offenses that emphasized different aspects of the game. These aspects were exemplified in the game, which saw Clemson pass for more yards than Virginia Tech, while the Hokies ran for more yards than the Tigers.

Virginia Tech jumped out to an early lead and maintained it throughout the game. Vick had a 23-yard touchdown run on the game's opening drive, then helped the Hokies expand their lead to 14–0 by the end of the first quarter. The Tigers narrowed Tech's lead to 14–10 in the second quarter, but the Hokies scored another touchdown before halftime and went into the second half with a 21–10 lead. Injuries knocked Clemson's two leading running backs out of the game, and starting Clemson quarterback Woodrow Dantzler was removed from the game after he proved ineffective against the Virginia Tech defense. Despite these changes, the Tigers were unable to reduce Virginia Tech's lead, which stood at 34–13 at the end of the third quarter. A late Clemson touchdown moved the Tigers within two touchdowns, but Virginia Tech answered with a touchdown of its own, making the final score 41–20.

In recognition of his performance in leading his team to a victory, Vick was named the game's most valuable player. It was his final collegiate game, and four months after the Gator Bowl, he was selected with the first overall selection in the 2001 NFL draft. A handful of other players who participated in the Gator Bowl also were selected in the draft.

== Team selection ==
For the 2000–01 college football season, the Gator Bowl had the right to select the No. 2 bowl-eligible team from both the Atlantic Coast Conference (ACC) and the Big East Conference. The bowl game's administrators also had a contract to include Notre Dame if that school met certain entry requirements. The conference champions of the ACC and Big East were guaranteed a spot in a Bowl Championship Series game, and there also was the possibility of an at-large BCS selection for any team in each conference if it finished high enough in the BCS Poll but did not win the conference championship.

=== Clemson ===
The Clemson Tigers entered the 2000–2001 college football season after a 6–6 season in 1999 under first-year head coach Tommy Bowden. Fans and college football analysts predicted Bowden would continue Clemson's resurgence from a 3–8 season during the year before Bowden was hired. Some pointed to Bowden's undefeated season in the second year after assuming the head coaching job at Tulane University as a sign of what to expect from Clemson. Most analysts, however, anticipated a more moderate improvement over the previous year. In the annual preseason poll of media who covered Atlantic Coast Conference football, Clemson tied for second with Georgia Tech. Both teams were far behind perennial favorite Florida State, however. Nationally, Clemson debuted at No. 17 in the preseason AP Poll and No. 20 in the preseason coaches' poll.

The Tigers opened their season against Division I-AA opponent The Citadel, whom they beat handily, 38–0. That victory was followed by two blowout wins: 62–9 against Missouri and 55–7 against ACC opponent Wake Forest. Those three games were typical of Clemson's first eight, which the Tigers won in succession. After the win against Wake Forest, Clemson beat Virginia, Duke, North Carolina State, Maryland, and North Carolina. In the final win of that streak, starting quarterback Woodrow Dantzler was replaced by backup Willie Simmons in the second quarter due to an injury to Dantzler.

With an 8–0 record and a No. 5 national ranking, Clemson hosted Georgia Tech. In the game, the Yellow Jackets posted a school-record offensive effort in an upset victory over the Tigers. Clemson took a 28–24 lead with 1:52 remaining in the game, but the Yellow Jackets drove 80 yards in 11 plays before ending with a one-handed catch for a touchdown, giving Clemson its first loss of the season. The defeat eliminated the Tigers from national championship contention, but they still had a chance to win the conference championship if they defeated Florida State the following week.

The Florida State Seminoles are coached by Bobby Bowden, father of Tommy Bowden. Their 2000 matchup marked only the second time that a father and son had faced each other as opposing head football coaches. The only other meeting had been the previous year, when Tommy lost by three points to his father. In the 2000 meeting, No. 4 Florida State dominated No. 10 Clemson from the start of the game. In an effort to impress BCS voters, Florida State ran up the score and the game ended with the Seminoles on top, 54–7. The Seminoles' win gave them the ACC football championship and dropped Clemson to a No. 16 ranking. With its spot as the No. 2 ACC team assured, Clemson accepted a bid to the Gator Bowl on November 14, prior to its annual in-state rivalry game against South Carolina. In that game, South Carolina took a one-point lead with 59 seconds remaining, but Clemson drove the length of the field and kicked a field goal as time expired, giving the Tigers a 16–14 win to end the regular season.

=== Virginia Tech ===
During the 1999–2000 college football season, Virginia Tech went undefeated during the regular season but lost to Florida State in the 2000 BCS National Championship Game. In the offseason following the championship-game loss, Tech fans and pundits anticipated a possible repeat of the Hokies' undefeated regular season and national championship run. In the annual preseason poll of media members covering Big East Conference football, Virginia Tech was picked to finish second; Tech received nine first-place votes to Miami's 15. In the preseason Associated Press college football poll, Virginia Tech was 11th.

When games for the 2000 college football season were scheduled, Virginia Tech was picked to host the annual Black Coaches & Administrators Classic, the opening game of the national Division I-A season. Georgia Tech was picked as the opponent, but on the day of the game, severe lightning storms hit the Blacksburg, Virginia area. ESPN commentator Lee Corso's rental car was struck by lightning, and the game was postponed due to severe weather. It was never rescheduled and eventually was canceled.

After the BCA Classic was canceled, Virginia Tech opened the regular season with a 52–23 blowout win over Akron. This was followed by a 45–28 win over East Carolina and a 49–0 shutout of Rutgers. The three wins typified the early part of Virginia Tech's schedule, which also featured wins against Boston College, Temple, West Virginia, Syracuse, and Pittsburgh. By virtue of winning its first eight games of the season, Tech rose to a No. 2 national ranking prior to facing No. 3 Miami on November 4.

Virginia Tech star quarterback Michael Vick suffered a severely sprained ankle in the game against Pittsburgh, and strong-performing wide receiver André Davis was temporarily crippled by bursitis in his left foot. Despite these injuries, commentators predicted a high-scoring game that was sometimes referred to as "the Big East's game of the year". It was predicted that the winner likely would be a shoo-in for that year's national championship game. With Vick injured, backup quarterback Dave Meyer started the game for the Hokies, who fell behind 14–0 in the first quarter. In desperation, Vick tried to play despite his injury, but he participated in only 19 plays before leaving the game for good. Miami quarterback Ken Dorsey threw three long touchdown passes, and Miami won the game, 41–21.

The loss knocked Tech out of contention for the national championship and the conference championship, since Miami was a fellow member of the Big East. The Hokies also fell to No. 8 in the AP Poll during the week after the game. In that week, they rebounded by beating the University of Central Florida, 44–21. Ranked No. 6 after the win, Tech defeated in-state rival Virginia, 42–21, in the annual battle for the Commonwealth Cup.

Though the loss to Miami knocked the Hokies out of contention for the Big East championship and its accompanying automatic BCS bid, there was the possibility that Tech could receive an at-large BCS game bid if it scored high enough in the final BCS poll and the administrators of a BCS game wanted to invite the Hokies. Tech was considered a long shot due to the availability of Oregon State and Notre Dame, two teams with large followings that would attract greater television revenue and ticket sales. Gator Bowl officials made plans based on different possibilities. If Virginia Tech was selected for a BCS bowl but Notre Dame was not, the Fighting Irish would play in the Gator Bowl. If both were selected, Big East No. 3 Pittsburgh would be given the nod for the Gator Bowl. On December 3, the BCS selections were announced: The Fiesta Bowl selected No. 5 Oregon State and No. 10 Notre Dame instead of No. 6 Virginia Tech. This left the Hokies available for the Gator Bowl, which picked them on the next day.

== Pregame buildup ==
In the weeks before the Gator Bowl, media and fan attention focused on Virginia Tech's possible disappointment at not being selected for a BCS game, the coaching situations at the two schools, and the issue of whether or not Tech quarterback Michael Vick would return for another year of collegiate football. After the Virginia Tech-Clemson matchup was announced for the Gator Bowl, spread bettors favored Virginia Tech to win by 6.5 points. The betting line remained there throughout the month of December and until the game began. There were almost no off-field incidents involving players from either team: The only notable event involved two backup players from Clemson who were indicted for money counterfeiting and were suspended for the Gator Bowl. In exchange for appearing in the game, the teams were guaranteed to split a payout of $3,313,610.

=== Virginia Tech disappointment ===
Immediately after the Fiesta Bowl bypassed Virginia Tech in favor of lower-ranked Notre Dame, protests from Tech fans and opponents of the BCS system erupted. Some said the selection was "unfair", that Virginia Tech was "hosed", or that the pick of Notre Dame was a "snub" of the Hokies. In an interview immediately after the selection, Vick said the Gator Bowl bid provided motivation to win the Gator Bowl. "We're going to go out there and make a statement, play a great game and show the nation", he said. Clemson, on the other hand, was enthusiastic about the Gator Bowl bid. A win in the game would have given the Tigers their first 10-win season since 1990, and the Gator Bowl appearance marked a continued improvement over its showing the previous year. Clemson players viewed the game as a reward for a successful season, while Virginia Tech players perceived it from a more workmanlike point of view. Due to revenue-sharing agreements among Big East schools, Virginia Tech's selection by the Gator Bowl resulted in a payment of $1.7 million less than if it had been selected by a BCS bowl game. Instead of receiving about $3.5 million from the revenue agreement and bowl payout, Tech received about $1.8 million.

=== Coaching changes ===
Both Clemson and Virginia Tech endured questions about their coaching staffs in the weeks and months prior to the Gator Bowl. Virginia Tech head coach Frank Beamer was interviewed by North Carolina prior to the end of the regular season, and he debated whether or not to accept that school's head football coaching job. On November 27, one week before Tech's selection by the Gator Bowl, Beamer announced that he would not be departing for North Carolina or any other school. Beamer also was considered for the vacant head-coaching position with the NFL's Washington Redskins, but he also declined that position. Other Virginia Tech football coaches were targeted by teams to fill vacant head-coaching positions. Virginia Tech offensive coordinator Rickey Bustle was interviewed for a job at Toledo, but he declined the position. Virginia Tech defensive coordinator Bud Foster was interviewed for the head-coaching job at Virginia, but he likewise declined the job.

Tech's situation was not reflected at Clemson, where offensive coordinator Rich Rodriguez announced that he was leaving the team for the head football coach job at West Virginia University, where he competed as a player in the 1980s. Rodriguez did not participate in Clemson's practices prior to the Gator Bowl, and he did not coach during the game. Replacing Rodriguez as temporary offensive coordinator was Brad Scott. Joining him in the press box during the Gator Bowl was Mike O'Cain, who was hired as Clemson's new quarterbacks coach. In an effort to prevent further defections, Clemson awarded head coach Tommy Bowden a seven-year contract extension worth $1.1 million annually plus incentives.

=== Michael Vick debate ===
Throughout the regular season, a constant question hanging over the Virginia Tech Hokies football team was whether or not star quarterback Michael Vick would return for another year at the school. The National Football League requires that players be at least three years out of high school before they are eligible for the NFL draft. Vick, who had not played during his freshman year at the school, would be three years out of high school in the spring following the Gator Bowl.

Vick attempted to defuse the discussion when he announced on December 15 that he would be returning for his fourth year with the team. But in late December, Vick wavered on that decision when it became clear that if he left the team, he would be selected as the No. 1 overall pick in the draft. Heading into the Gator Bowl, his decision was still up in the air.

=== Clemson offense ===
During the regular season, Clemson was No. 10 in rushing yards, averaging 236.4 per game. Its passing offense was somewhat weaker, ranked No. 63 and averaging 210.1 yards per game. In total, however, Clemson's offense ranked No. 10 when the two amounts were added together. In scoring offense, the Tigers averaged 36.0 points per game, good enough for No. 14 in the country in that category.

Clemson's offense was led by quarterback Woodrow Dantzler, who finished the regular season having completed 58 percent of his passes for 1,691 yards, 10 touchdowns, and six interceptions. He also ran the ball extremely successfully, gaining 947 yards and 13 touchdowns on the ground. In the running game, Dantzler had the second-most yards on the team. No. 1 was running back Travis Zachery, who ran 201 times for 1,012 yards and 13 touchdowns. Zachery also was one of Dantzler's favorite passing targets. He caught 27 passes for 288 yards and four touchdowns during the regular season.

Wide receivers Rod Gardner and Jackie Robinson were the No. 1 and No. 3 recipients, respectively, of Dantzler's passes. Gardner caught 51 passes for 956 yards and six touchdowns. Robinson, unrelated to the baseball player of the same name, caught 24 passes for 276 yards and three touchdowns.

=== Virginia Tech offense ===
Virginia Tech's offense was No. 5 nationally in rushing yards, averaging 270.5 per game. Their passing offense was abysmal, however. The Hokies were ranked No. 100 in that category after averaging 155.9 yards per game during the regular season. Combined, Tech was ranked No. 20 in total offense. In scoring offense, they found success comparable to their rushing game. After averaging 40.3 points per game, they were ranked No. 5.

Virginia Tech's offense was led by quarterback Michael Vick, who carried the ball 104 times for 617 yards and eight touchdowns despite an ankle injury that limited his mobility in the final six games of the regular season. Tech also had two successful running backs: Lee Suggs and Andre Kendrick. Suggs had 222 carries for 1,207 yards and 27 touchdowns during the regular season, while Kendrick had 102 rushes for 547 yards and three touchdowns. Suggs was the No. 1 rusher in the Big East in terms of touchdowns and rushing yards. In recognition of his accomplishments, he was given the Dudley Award, which recognizes the top college football player in Virginia.

One of Vick's favorite targets in the limited Tech passing attack was wide receiver André Davis, who caught 24 passes for 318 yards and two touchdowns. Davis was limited by the fact that he played in only nine of Tech's 11 games, but he still finished as the Hokies' No. 2 receiver in terms of yardage. Tech's No. 1 receiver was Emmett Johnson, who caught 34 passes for 574 yards and three touchdowns.

=== Clemson defense ===
Clemson's defense was strongest against the rush. During the regular season, the Tigers allowed an average of 101.8 yards per game on the ground, good enough for No. 18 nationally. Their passing defense was not nearly as successful. On average, the Tigers allowed 238.6 yards per game through the air, making their pass defense the 97th best in division I-A football during the regular season. With both categories combined, the defense was ranked No. 37. In terms of points allowed, rather than yardage, the Tigers were ranked No. 23 after giving up an average of 19.3 yards per game.

Linebacker Chad Carson was the team's defensive leader. He had 146 tackles (the most on the team), two pass breakups, and one forced fumble during the regular season. Fellow linebacker Keith Adams was No. 2 on the team in tackles with 138, including five sacks. He also had one interception, three forced fumbles, and three pass breakups. In pass defense, the Tigers' highest achiever was cornerback Alex Ardley, who led the team in interceptions with five. He also had seven pass breakups.

One notable absence from the Tigers' defense during the Gator Bowl was defensive end Nick Eason, who led the team in sacks but suffered a torn Achilles tendon during a mid-December practice. Backup defensive end Marcus Lewis also missed the game due to injury. He tore an anterior cruciate ligament in a pregame practice.

=== Virginia Tech defense ===
Virginia Tech's defense likewise was more successful against opponents' rushing offense than their passing attack. Tech permitted an average of 99.3 yards per game on the ground (16th), but allowed 224.4 yards per game through the air (79th). In total, Tech was ranked the No. 27 defense in the country—slightly better than Clemson. In scoring defense, the Hokies allowed 22.6 points per game on average, good enough for No. 45. In this category, they were worse than the Tigers.

Linebacker Ben Taylor was the Hokies' defensive leader. He was No. 1 on the team in tackles with 103. That figure included 1.5 sacks. He also had two interceptions, five pass breakups, and one forced fumble. Four year starting linebacker Jake Houseright was the team's No. 2 tackler. He had 75, including five tackles for loss. He also had five pass breakups and recovered one fumble. Free safety Willie Pile, who was in his first year as a starter on the defense, was Tech's leading performer in pass coverage. He had six interceptions—the most on the team—broke up 10 passes, forced one fumble, and recovered one fumble.

== Game summary ==
The 2001 Gator Bowl kicked off on January 1, 2001, at Alltel Stadium in Jacksonville, Florida. At kickoff, the weather was partly cloudy at 45 °F (7 °C) degrees, with 41 percent humidity and a 6 miles per hour (10 km/h) wind from the northwest. Virginia Tech won the traditional pregame coin toss to determine first possession and elected to kick off to Clemson to begin the game.

=== First quarter ===
Clemson fielded the opening kickoff at the two-yard line and returned it to their 25-yard line, where the Tigers' offense performed the game's first offensive play, a one-yard scramble by Dantzler. A subsequent running play and an incomplete pass caused Clemson to go three-and-out before punting. Clemson punter Jamie Somaini mishandled the ball, however, and Virginia Tech's defense tackled him at the Tigers' 23-yard line. On Tech's first play after the turnover, quarterback Michael Vick completed a 23-yard pass to Jared Ferguson for a touchdown. The extra point kick by Carter Warley was successful, and Virginia Tech had a 7–0 lead with 13:23 remaining in the first quarter.

Virginia Tech's post-touchdown kickoff was downed at the Clemson 26-yard line, where the Tigers began their second offensive possession. It began no better than the first, as Dantzler was tackled for a three-yard loss by defensive tackle Lamar Cobb. A rush for no gain and a short pass forced Clemson to again punt before gaining a first down. Somaini's second punt was kicked cleanly, and the Hokies returned the punt to their 42-yard line. Two rushes and a pass to the 50-yard line were not enough for a first down, and Tech punted to the Clemson 17-yard line.

The Tigers' third possession didn't produce anything more than their first two possessions did. A running play was stopped for no gain, Dantzler was sacked for a loss of three yards by David Pugh, and a scramble by Dantzler gained only four yards. Clemson's punt was downed at the Tech 41-yard line, and the Hokies had another chance on offense. On the first play of the drive, Vick scrambled for a nine-yard gain. On the next play, Tech gained a first down on a run by backup running back Andre Kendrick to the Clemson 46-yard line. After an incomplete pass, Vick completed a six-yard toss to Kendrick. A five-yard offsides penalty gave Tech a first down at the Clemson 35-yard line, then Vick completed a six-yard throw to wide receiver Emmett Johnson. This was followed by Vick scrambling for a first down at the Clemson 19-yard line. A reverse run by Johnson picked up five yards, then a run up the middle gained a first down at the Clemson nine-yard line. Two rushes by Kendrick failed to reach the five-yard line, then Vick ran six yards for Tech's second touchdown of the game. The extra point was good, and Tech extended its lead to 14–0 with 1:08 remaining in the quarter.

Virginia Tech's kickoff was returned to the Clemson 26-yard line, and the drive began with an incomplete pass from Dantzler. After that, the Tigers gained their first down of the game with a pass from Dantzler to wide receiver Rod Gardner at the 38-yard line. A run by Dantzler gained three yards, then Zachery gained five more with a run to the left side. Zachery's run ran the final seconds off the clock in the first quarter, which ended with Virginia Tech leading, 14–0.

=== Second quarter ===
The second quarter began with Clemson in possession of the ball and facing third and two at its 46-yard line. The Tigers gained a first down with the first play of the quarter, a four-yard rush by Zachery. From midfield, Dantzler threw an incomplete pass then ran for no gain. On third down, Dantzler completed a long pass to Justin Watts, who gained a first down at the Tech 23-yard line. On the next play, Dantzler completed a pass to Zachery, who sprinted and then dove over a Hokie defender into the end zone for Clemson's first points of the game. Unfortunately, Zachery broke his foot during the play and was ruled out for the rest of the game. The extra point was good, and the Tigers narrowed Tech's lead to 14–7 with 13:34 remaining in the first half.

Clemson's post-touchdown kickoff was bobbled by kick returner Andre Kendrick at the Tech one-yard line, but Kendrick broke free of the Clemson special teams defense for a 34-yard return to the 35-yard line. Tech's first play after the return was an 11-yard run by Lee Suggs up the right side of the field. After the first down, Suggs ran straight ahead for a short gain, then Vick scrambled to the Clemson 37-yard line and another first down. Suggs then gained 18 yards on a run to the left side of the field. At the Clemson 19-yard line, Suggs was stopped for a loss of one yard, then Vick was sacked for a loss of five yards. The third-down play was an incomplete pass, and Carter Warley entered the game to attempt a 42-yard field goal. The kick bounced off the field goal crossbar but did not cross it, thus denying the Hokies three points. With 10:33 remaining in the half, Tech still had a 14–7 lead.

Following the missed field goal, Clemson's offense started at its 25-yard line. On the first play of the drive, Dantzler completed a pass to wide receiver Rod Gardner, who ran for 25 yards and a first down at the 50-yard line. A nine-yard shovel pass play was followed by a run up the middle for a first down at the Tech 37-yard line. Dantzler completed an eight-yard pass, then a running play was stopped short of the first-down marker. On third down, Dantzler faked a quarterback sneak in order to attempt a long pass downfield. Dantzler was unable to pass, however, and was sacked for a four-yard loss. Rather than attempt a field goal or punt the ball, Clemson coach Tommy Bowden had his team attempt to gain a first down. Dantzler scrambled forward, but didn't gain the five yards needed. The Tigers thus turned the ball over on downs at the Tech 28-yard line.

Tech began its drive with an incomplete pass, which was followed by a short run. On third down, Vick prepared to throw the ball, but he was hit by Clemson defender Keith Adams and fumbled the ball. Fellow Clemson defender Terry Jolly recovered the loose football and returned it to the Tech 14-yard line before he was tackled. Following the turnover, Dantzler was stopped on a short run then threw two incomplete passes. Rather than again attempt to convert a fourth down, Bowden sent in kicker Aaron Hunt to attempt a 28-yard field goal. The kick soared through the uprights, and Clemson narrowed Virginia Tech's lead to 14–10 with 5:45 remaining in the quarter.

Kendrick returned Clemson's post-score kickoff to the Tech 23-yard line. A two-yard run by Suggs was followed by a pass to Davis at the Tech 39-yard line for a first down. Two running plays set up third down and two, then Vick completed a 50-yard pass to Kendrick, who picked up a first down at the Clemson four-yard line. From there, it took Suggs two rushes to pass the goal line for Virginia Tech's third touchdown of the game. The extra point was good, and Tech extended its lead to 21–10 with 2:26 before halftime.

Tech's post-touchdown kickoff bounced to the Clemson two-yard line before it was returned to the Clemson 12-yard line. An incomplete pass on first down was followed by a first-down pass to Gardner at the 22-yard line. Dantzler then completed a pass to Watts at the 34-yard line for another first down. After an incomplete pass, Dantzler scrambled for a first down at the Clemson 47-yard line, where he completed a 17-yard pass to Robinson as time ticked below one minute remaining. From the Tech 36-yard line, Dantzler completed a pass to Gardner at the Tech 29-yard line. After a time out with 33 seconds remaining, Dantzler threw an incomplete pass. This was followed by another incomplete pass, and Clemson converted the first down with a pass to the Tech 24-yard line. An incomplete pass on first down was followed by another on second down. Following the play, there was only eight seconds left on the clock, and coach Bowden ordered Hunt into the game to attempt a 41-yard field goal. The kick was short and to the right, and Clemson turned the ball over with two seconds remaining. Vick took a knee to run the final seconds off the clock, and Virginia Tech entered halftime with a 21–10 lead.

=== Third quarter ===
Because Clemson received the ball to begin the game, Virginia Tech received the ball to begin the second half. Kendrick received the kickoff at the Tech goal line and returned it to the 20-yard line, where the Hokies started the first possession of the second half. On the first play, Virginia Tech committed a 10-yard holding penalty. Suggs gained five yards with a run up the middle, then Vick completed a pass to tight end Browning Wynn at the 28-yard line. On third down, the Hokies were stopped short of the first down marker and punted for only the second time in the game. During the kick, Clemson committed a 15-yard roughing the kicker penalty. The penalty allowed the Hokies to retain the football and gave them a first down at their 44-yard line. On the first play after the penalty, Vick completed a 55-yard pass to Davis at the Clemson one-yard line. After the pass, Suggs ran straight ahead for his second touchdown of the game. The extra point was missed by Warley, but Tech still extended its lead to 27–10 with 12:19 remaining in the quarter.

Virginia Tech's kickoff was recovered and Clemson's kick returner ran out of bounds at the Tigers' 12-yard line. Dantzler scrambled for two yards, but Virginia Tech linebacker Jake Houseright was injured during the play and left the game. After a delay while the injured Houseright was helped off the field, Dantzler scrambled for six yards. Bernard Rambert gained a first down with a two-yard run, then he gained five yards on a run up the middle. Dantzler followed the gain with a 13-yard run of his own and a first down at the Clemson 40-yard line. Rambert caught a five-yard pass from Dantzler, then he ran for one yard up the left side of the field. During the play, Rambert was injured and had to be helped off the field. He was replaced by third-string freshman running back Keith Kelly. Dantzler threw an incomplete pass on third down, then Somaini punted the ball to Virginia Tech. The kick bounced off the chest of the Virginia Tech kick returner, and the loose ball was scooped up by Robert Carswell of Clemson. Following the turnover, Clemson's offense had a first down at the Tech 20-yard line with 8:44 remaining in the quarter.

Kelly gained one yard on first down, then Dantzler picked up 11 yards and a first down on a run up the middle of the field. An incomplete pass was followed by a run for no gain and another incomplete pass. Facing fourth and goal at the eight-yard line, Bowden sent in his field-goal kicker. After the Tigers called a time out, Hunt completed a 27-yard field goal attempt and cut Virginia Tech's lead to 27–13 with 7:19 remaining in the quarter.

Clemson's post-score kickoff was fielded at the five-yard line by Kendrick and returned to the Tech 25-yard line. The first play of the drive was an option run with Vick and Kendrick, who broke free of the Clemson defense for a 45-yard run and a first down at the Clemson 29-yard line. Two short rushes were followed by a pass to fullback Cullen Hawkins at the 10-yard line for a first down. Clemson committed a five-yard offsides penalty, then Ferguson ran straight ahead for a touchdown. The extra point kick was good, and Tech took a 34–13 lead with 5:14 left in the quarter.

The post-touchdown kickoff was returned to the Clemson 30-yard line, where it was fumbled. The loose football jetted forward and was recovered by a Clemson player at the 34-yard line, where the Tigers' offense began another drive. The first play of the possession was a nine-yard pass from Dantzler to Kelly, and it was followed by a shovel pass to Kelly, who gained a first down at the Tech 47-yard line. From there, Kantzler ran straight ahead for 27 yards and a first down at the Tech 20-yard line. After two incomplete passes, Clemson completed a five-yard false-start penalty. A one-yard run by Dantzler was followed by an unsuccessful fourth-down conversion attempt. Dantzler attempted a pass downfield, but the ball was intercepted by Ronyell Whitaker, who returned the ball to the Tech 32-yard line.

In possession of the ball and a large lead, Virginia Tech proceeded to start running out the clock by executing running plays, which do not halt the game clock at their conclusion as do incomplete passing plays. Suggs gained nine yards on a run up the middle, then Ferguson was tackled for a loss after an incomplete pass by Vick. Tech punted, and the ball was downed at the 26-yard line. Following the punt, Clemson put backup quarterback Willie Simmons into the game. On his first play, Simmons was sacked by Jim Davis for a five-yard loss. The second play was a repeat of the first, as Davis again sacked Simmons, this time for an 11-yard loss. On third down, Simmons threw an incomplete pass, and Clemson punted after going three and out.

The kick bounced out of bounds at the Clemson 44-yard line, and Virginia Tech's offense returned to the field. On the first play, Vick attempted a pass into the end zone. The throw was intercepted by Clemson defender Robert Carswell, who downed the ball in the end zone for a touchback. The interception was the final play of the third quarter, which ended with Virginia Tech in the lead, 34–13.

=== Fourth quarter ===
The fourth quarter began with Clemson in possession of the ball and starting a drive at its 20-yard line following a touchback. On the first play of the drive, Simmons threw an interception to Virginia Tech defender Willie Pile at the 50-yard line. Following the turnover, the Hokies continued running out the clock with rushing plays up the middle of the field. A short gain by Suggs was followed by a five-yard offsides penalty against Clemson, which advanced the Hokies to the Clemson 45-yard line. Ferguson then gained a first down on a run to the 32-yard line. On first down, Vick was slightly injured after attempting to pitch the ball forward. He left the game and was replaced by backup quarterback Dave Meyer. Tech advanced the ball on short runs, setting up fourth down and seven. Tech coach Frank Beamer called a time out, allowing Vick to re-enter the game. The fourth-down play was an incomplete pass, and Tech turned the ball over on downs with 11:49 remaining in the game.

Following the turnover, Clemson received the ball at its 28-yard line. Simmons ran the ball straight ahead for an eight-yard gain, gained one yard on a run, then Kelly ran for a first down at the 40-yard line. On first down, Simmons completed an 18-yard pass to Gardner at the Tech 42-yard line. Simmons then completed a six-yard pass before throwing a shovel pass to Kelly for a first down at the Tech 32-yard line. An incomplete pass was followed by six-yard toss and a pass to Watts at the 12-yard line. Simmons ran out of bounds for a two-yard loss, then completed a touchdown pass to Gardner. The extra point kick was good, and Clemson closed Virginia Tech's lead to 34–20 with 7:19 remaining.

With limited time remaining, Clemson attempted an onside kick in an effort to retain possession and have a chance to make up some of the scoring deficit. The kick was recovered by Virginia Tech, however, and the Vick-led Tech offense returned to the field at the Clemson 44-yard line. Suggs was stopped for no gain on a run up the middle, Vick threw an incomplete pass, then he completed a 14-yard pass to Wynn for a first down at the Clemson 30-yard line. After the first down, Ferguson gained a few yards on a run up the middle, then Suggs advanced the ball to just short of the first-down marker. On third down, Suggs gained the first down with a run up the middle. Following the first down, Clemson defender Alex Ardley was called for a personal foul and ejected from the game. The penalty gave Virginia Tech a first down at the Clemson 10-yard line. From there, Clemson was called for a five-yard offsides penalty. On the first play after the consecutive penalties, Vick pitched the ball to Suggs, who ran into the end zone untouched. The extra point kick was good, and Virginia Tech extended its lead to 41–20 with 3:41 remaining in the game.

Virginia Tech's post-touchdown kickoff was returned to the 23-yard line, and Clemson went three and out after Simmons threw three incomplete passes. The Tigers' punt was returned to the Tech 30-yard line, and the Hokies began another possession. Vick was again replaced by Meyer at the quarterback position, and running back Dwayne Ward ran up the middle of the field for a short gain. Third-string running back Keith Burnell gained more yardage with a run up the middle, then Ward picked up a first down with a run up the left side of the field. During the play, Tech committed a 10-yard penalty, but the resulting yardage was still enough for a first down. Tech proceeded to run out the remaining seconds on the clock, and the Virginia Tech Hokies earned a 41–20 victory.

== Statistical summary ==
Statistical comparison
	CLEM	VT
1st downs	21	19
Total yards	351	416
Passing yards	243	205
Rushing yards	88	211
Penalties	7–50	2–20
Turnovers	2	3
Time of possession	28:24	31:36

In recognition of his success in leading the Hokies to a bowl game win, Virginia Tech quarterback Michael Vick was named the most valuable player of the winning team. Vick finished the game having completed 10 of 18 passes for 205 yards, one touchdown, and one interception. Vick also ran the ball nine times for a gain of 21 yards and a touchdown. He was sacked twice, resulting in a loss of two yards. On the opposite side of the ball, Clemson wide receiver Rod Gardner was named the MVP of the losing team. He caught seven passes for 94 yards and a touchdown during the game.

Virginia Tech outgained Clemson on the ground by a nearly 3:1 margin. Tech running back Lee Suggs carried the ball 20 times for 73 yards and three touchdowns. At the time, Suggs' three touchdowns were a Virginia Tech bowl game record and tied the Gator Bowl record for most touchdowns by a player. Fellow running backs Andre Kendrick and Jarrett Ferguson gained 52 yards and 26 yards, respectively. Suggs' scores and the two by Ferguson also marked the first time the Hokies had two players with two or more touchdowns in a bowl game.

On the other side of the ball, Clemson's 44 pass attempts and 21 pass completions were the most allowed by Virginia Tech in any bowl game to that point. The Tigers outgained Virginia Tech through the air by almost 40 yards, and Clemson's two quarterbacks performed consistently throughout the game. Dantzler completed 15 of 32 passes for one touchdown and 180 yards, while Simmons completed six of 12 passes for 63 yards, one touchdown, and two interceptions. On the ground, Dantzler led all rushers with 18 carries for 81 yards. Clemson's No. 2 rusher was Zachery, who had five carries for 15 yards.

Defensively, Virginia Tech intercepted two Clemson passes and sacked Clemson quarterbacks six times for a loss of 28 yards. The Tech defense held Clemson without a first down and to -2 yards of total offense until less than two minutes were left in the first quarter. Clemson's defense sacked Vick twice for a total loss of two yards.

== Postgame effects ==
Clemson's loss lowered it to a final record of 9–3, while Virginia Tech's win brought it to a final record of 11–1. Clemson remained relatively stationary in the polls. The Tigers remained at No. 16 in the Associated Press poll and dropped from No. 13 to No. 14 in the Coaches' Poll. Despite the Hokies' win, they did not advance in either the Associated Press or Coaches' polls. Tech ended the year ranked No. 6 in both polls and No. 5 in the BCS. The victory was the first in three bowl trips for the Hokies. The loss was Clemson's fifth straight in a bowl game and fourth in eight trips to the Gator Bowl at that point.

=== Michael Vick ===
Immediately after the conclusion of the Gator Bowl, Vick was asked by an NBC broadcaster if he intended to return to Virginia Tech for another year of collegiate football. He responded that he would discuss matters with his family and Tech head coach Frank Beamer before making a decision. That announcement sparked a fresh round of speculation from sports pundits and fans wondering if Vick would choose to return to school or enter the 2001 NFL draft. Virginia Tech, through its football coaching staff, began an intensive lobbying campaign in an effort to convince Vick to stay. On January 11, 2001, Vick held a press conference to announce that he would be forgoing his final two years of collegiate eligibility to enter the NFL Draft. Immediately after the announcement, he was predicted to be the No. 1 pick in the draft, a hypothesis realized on April 21, when he was selected by the Atlanta Falcons, who had traded draft picks in order to have the right to select Vick.

=== 2001 NFL draft ===
Vick was not the only player for whom the 2001 Gator Bowl was the final collegiate contest. Virginia Tech had two other players selected in the draft, and Clemson had three. From the Hokies, defensive back Cory Bird was selected with the 91st pick and center Matt Lehr was taken with the 137th selection. Clemson's first NFL draft selection was wide receiver Rod Gardner, who was taken 15th. Also picked was defensive back Robert Carswell (244th).
