= 2000 Duke Blue Devils football team =

American college football season

2000 Duke Blue Devils football
- Conference: Atlantic Coast Conference
- Record: 0–11 (0–8 ACC)
- Head coach: Carl Franks (2nd season)
- Offensive scheme: Fun and gun
- Defensive coordinator: Bob Trott (5th season)
- Base defense: 4–3
- MVP: Mike Hart
- Captains: Troy Andrew; Troy Austin; Todd DeLamielleure; Spencer Romine
- Home stadium: Wallace Wade Stadium

2000 Atlantic Coast Conference football standings
	Conf.			Overall
Team	W		L	W		L
No. 5 Florida State $	8	–	0	11	–	2
No. 17 Georgia Tech	6	–	2	9	–	3
No. 16 Clemson	6	–	2	9	–	3
Virginia	5	–	3	6	–	6
NC State	4	–	4	8	–	4
North Carolina	3	–	5	6	–	5
Maryland	3	–	5	5	–	6
Wake Forest	1	–	7	2	–	9
Duke	0	–	8	0	–	11
$ – BCS representative as conference champion; Rankings from AP Poll

The 2000 Duke Blue Devils football team represented Duke University as a member of the Atlantic Coast Conference (ACC) during the 2000 NCAA Division I-A football season. Led by second-year head coach Carl Franks, the Blue Devils compiled an overall record of 0–11 with a mark of 0–8 in conference play, placing last out of nine teams in the ACC. The team played home games at Wallace Wade Stadium in Durham, North Carolina.

== Schedule ==
Date	Time	Opponent	Site	TV	Result	Attendance	Source
September 2	6:00 pm	East Carolina*	Wallace Wade Stadium; Durham, NC		L 0–38	30,224	
September 9	1:00 pm	at Northwestern*	Ryan Field; Evanston, IL		L 5–38	23,209	
September 16	6:00 pm	Virginia	Wallace Wade Stadium; Durham, NC		L 10–26	18,776	
September 23	7:00 pm	at Vanderbilt*	Vanderbilt Stadium; Nashville, TN		L 7–26	25,486	
September 30	12:00 pm	No. 7 Clemson	Wallace Wade Stadium; Durham, NC	JPS	L 22–52	16,872	
October 14	7:00 pm	at No. 5 Florida State	Doak Campbell Stadium; Tallahassee, FL	PPV	L 14–63	80,280	
October 21	12:00 pm	at Georgia Tech	Bobby Dodd Stadium; Atlanta, GA	JPS	L 10–45	36,908	
October 28	12:00 pm	Maryland	Wallace Wade Stadium; Durham, NC	JPS	L 9–20	20,033	
November 4	12:00 pm	at Wake Forest	Groves Stadium; Winston-Salem, NC (rivalry)	JPS	L 26–28	19,224	
November 11	1:00 pm	at NC State	Carter–Finley Stadium; Raleigh, NC (rivalry)		L 31–35	51,680	
November 18	12:00 pm	North Carolina^{†}	Wallace Wade Stadium; Durham, NC (Victory Bell)	JPS	L 21–59	24,673	
*Non-conference game; ^{†}Homecoming; Rankings from AP Poll released prior to the game; All times are in Eastern time

== Roster ==
2000 Duke Blue Devils football team roster
Players
Coaches
Offense

Pos.	#	Name	Class
C	71	Troy Andrew	Sr
OT	70	Luke Bayer	Fr
QB	6	D. Bryant	So
QB	15	Bobby Campbell	Sr
WR	86	D.R. Cash	Jr
RB	5	Brian Clemmons	Fr
G	64	Michael Connolly	So
RB	4	Chris Douglas	Fr
G	72	Greg Dufala	So
G	69	Robb Leandro	Sr
G	74	Daryl Lewis	So
C	66	Jeff Lonergan	So
C	79	Shawn Lynch	Jr
OT	73	Drew Martin	So
G	77	John Miller	Jr
OL	65	Christian Mitchell	Fr
OL	78	Dan Mooney	Fr
FB	40	Zach Novak	Fr
OT	75	Drew Strojny	Fr
WR	87	Ryan Shannon	Sr
WR	2	Khary Sharpe	Fr
QB	3	Adam Smith	Fr
OT	76	Wes White	Sr
OL	68	Rusty Wilson	Fr
OL	67	Patrick Worsham	Fr

Defense

Pos.	#	Name	Class
DL	93	Joe Boniewicz	Fr
DE	98	Drew Ciepcielinski	Fr
LB	27	Ryan Fowler	Fr
DT	95	Tyran Grissom	Jr
CB	26	Quentin Holley	Jr
DT	96	Shawn Johnson	Fr
FS	34	Josh Kreider	So
DT	91	Tom Larkin	So
CB	28	D'Juan O'Donald	Fr
DE	92	Calen Powell	Fr
LB	24	Jamyon Small	So
DB	25	Terrell Smith	Fr
LB	35	Matt Zielinski	Fr

Special teams

Pos.	#	Name	Class

Head coach

- Carl Franks

Coordinators/assistant coaches

- Brad Sherrod
  (Linebackers coach)

Legend

- (C) Team captain
- (S) Suspended
- (I) Ineligible
- Injured
- Redshirt

Roster
Last update: 2000-09-16
