= 2000 Florida State Seminoles football team =

American college football season

2000 Florida State Seminoles football

ACC champion

Orange Bowl (BCS NCG), L 2–13 vs. Oklahoma
- Conference: Atlantic Coast Conference

Ranking
- Coaches: No. 4
- AP: No. 5
- Record: 11–2 (8–0 ACC)
- Head coach: Bobby Bowden (25th season)
- Offensive coordinator: Mark Richt (7th season)
- Offensive scheme: Pro-style
- Defensive coordinator: Mickey Andrews (17th season)
- Base defense: 4–3
- Captains: Brian Allen; Chris Weinke; Jean Jeune
- Home stadium: Doak Campbell Stadium

2000 Atlantic Coast Conference football standings
| | Conf. | | | Overall |
| Team | W | | L | W | | L |
|---|---|---|---|---|---|---|
| No. 5 Florida State $ | 8 | – | 0 | 11 | – | 2 |
| No. 17 Georgia Tech | 6 | – | 2 | 9 | – | 3 |
| No. 16 Clemson | 6 | – | 2 | 9 | – | 3 |
| Virginia | 5 | – | 3 | 6 | – | 6 |
| NC State | 4 | – | 4 | 8 | – | 4 |
| North Carolina | 3 | – | 5 | 6 | – | 5 |
| Maryland | 3 | – | 5 | 5 | – | 6 |
| Wake Forest | 1 | – | 7 | 2 | – | 9 |
| Duke | 0 | – | 8 | 0 | – | 11 |
$ – BCS representative as conference champion; Rankings from AP Poll

The 2000 Florida State Seminoles football team represented the Florida State University as a member of the Atlantic Coast Conference (ACC) during the 2000 NCAA Division I-A football season. Led by 25th-year head coach Bobby Bowden, the Seminoles compiled an overall record of 11–2 with a mark of 8–0 in conference play, winning the ACC title. Florida was invited to the Orange Bowl, making the program's third consecutive appearance in the BCS National Championship Game. There the Seminoles lost to Oklahoma. The team played home games at Doak Campbell Stadium in Tallahassee, Florida.

Senior quarterback Chris Weinke was awarded the Heisman Trophy as college football's most outstanding player. He was the second Florida State player to win the award, following Charlie Ward in 1993. Weinke led the nation in passing with 4,167 yards. In addition to the Heisman, Weinke won the Davey O'Brien Award and the Johnny Unitas Golden Arm Award. At the age of 28, he was the oldest player in history to win the Heisman Trophy. He finished his Florida State career with a 32–3 record and held numerous Seminoles records including most career passing yards and career touchdown passes.

== Schedule ==
| Date | Time | Opponent | Rank | Site | TV | Result | Attendance | Source |
|---|---|---|---|---|---|---|---|---|
| August 26 | 8:00 p.m. | vs. BYU* | No. 2 | Alltel Stadium; Jacksonville, FL (Pigskin Classic) | ABC | W 29–3 | 54,260 | |
| September 9 | 8:00 p.m. | at Georgia Tech | No. 2 | Bobby Dodd Stadium; Atlanta, GA | ABC | W 26–21 | 46,381 | |
| September 16 | 3:30 p.m. | North Carolina | No. 2 | Doak Campbell Stadium; Tallahassee, FL | ABC | W 63–14 | 79,287 | |
| September 23 | 6:00 p.m. | Louisville* | No. 2 | Doak Campbell Stadium; Tallahassee, FL | ESPN2 | W 31–0 | 80,741 | |
| September 28 | 12:00 p.m. | at Maryland | No. 2 | Byrd Stadium; College Park, MD | ESPN | W 59–7 | 47,044 | |
| October 7 | 12:00 p.m. | at No. 7 Miami (FL)* | No. 1 | Miami Orange Bowl; Miami, FL (rivalry, College GameDay) | CBS | L 24–27 | 80,905 | |
| October 14 | 7:00 p.m. | Duke^{†} | No. 7 | Doak Campbell Stadium; Tallahassee, FL | PPV | W 63–14 | 80,280 | |
| October 21 | 3:30 p.m. | Virginia | No. 6 | Doak Campbell Stadium; Tallahassee, FL (Jefferson–Eppes Trophy) | ABC | W 37–3 | 79,121 | |
| October 28 | 7:00 p.m. | at No. 21 NC State | No. 6 | Carter–Finley Stadium; Raleigh, NC | ESPN | W 58–14 | 52,384 | |
| November 4 | 7:30 p.m. | No. 10 Clemson | No. 4 | Doak Campbell Stadium; Tallahassee, FL (rivalry) | ESPN | W 54–7 | 82,514 | |
| November 11 | 8:00 p.m. | at Wake Forest | No. 3 | Groves Stadium; Winston-Salem, NC | PPV | W 35–6 | 27,071 | |
| November 18 | 8:00 p.m. | No. 4 Florida* | No. 3 | Doak Campbell Stadium; Tallahassee, FL (rivalry, College GameDay) | ABC | W 30–7 | 83,042 | |
| January 3 | 8:00 p.m. | vs. No. 1 Oklahoma* | No. 3 | Pro Player Stadium; Miami Gardens, FL (Orange Bowl, College GameDay) | ABC | L 2–13 | 76,835 | |
*Non-conference game; ^{†}Homecoming; Rankings from AP Poll released prior to the game; All times are in Eastern time

== Rankings ==
Ranking movements Legend: ██ Increase in ranking ██ Decrease in ranking ( ) = First-place votes
| | Week | | | | | | | | | | | | | | | | |
| Poll | Pre | 1 | 2 | 3 | 4 | 5 | 6 | 7 | 8 | 9 | 10 | 11 | 12 | 13 | 14 | 15 | Final |
|---|---|---|---|---|---|---|---|---|---|---|---|---|---|---|---|---|---|
| AP | 2 (29) | 2 (30) | 2 (28) | 2 (26) | 2 (26) | 2 (30) | 1 (42) | 7 | 6 | 6 | 4 (1) | 3 (1) | 3 (1) | 3 (1) | 3 (1) | 3 (1) | 5 |
| Coaches Poll | 2 (21) | 2 (17) | 2 (15) | 2 (10) | 2 (14) | 2 (14) | 2 (21) | 7 | 6 | 6 | 4 | 3 | 3 | 3 (1) | 3 (5) | 3 (1) | 4 |
| BCS | Not released | | | | | | | | | 5 | 3 | 2 | 3 | 2 | 2 | 2 | Not released |

== Roster ==
2000 Florida State Seminoles football team roster
Players
Coaches
Offense

| Pos. | # | Name | Class |
|---|---|---|---|
| RB | 1 | Jeff Chaney | Sr |
| WR | 4 | Anquan Boldin | So |
| WR | 13 | Marvin Minnis | Sr |
| QB | 16 | Chris Weinke | Sr |
| WR | 21 | Talman Gardner | So |
| RB | 22 | Davy Ford | Jr |
| RB | 23 | Travis Minor | Sr |
| OT | 75 | Char-ron Dorsey | Sr |
| OL | 78 | Donald Heaven | Sr |
| WR | 80 | Javon Walker | Jr |
| TE | 81 | Nick Franklin | Sr |
| TE | 82 | Patrick Hughes | Jr |
| WR | 83 | Devard Darling | Fr |
| TE | 85 | Ryan Sprague | Sr |

Defense

| Pos. | # | Name | Class |
|---|---|---|---|
| CB | 3 | Malcolm Tatum | So |
| DB | 6 | Derrick Gibson | Sr |
| CB | 10 | Stanford Samuels | Fr |
| CB | 27 | Tay Cody | Sr |
| FS | 28 | Chris Hope | Jr |
| LB | 29 | Tommy Polley | Sr |
| LB | 55 | Brian Allen | Sr |
| DE | 58 | Jamal Reynolds | Sr |
| DT | 90 | Kevin Emanuel | Fr |
| NG | 91 | Jeff Womble | Fr |
| NG | 92 | Travis Johnson | Fr |
| DT | 93 | Eric Powell | Jr |
| DE | 94 | O. J. Jackson | So |
| DT | 95 | Rian Cason | So |
| DE | 96 | Randy Wilkins | Sr |
| DT | 97 | Tony Benford | So |
| NG | 98 | Chris Woods | So |
| DE | 99 | David Warren | Sr |

Special teams

| Pos. | # | Name | Class |

Head coach

- Bobby Bowden

Coordinators/assistant coaches

Legend

- (C) Team captain
- (S) Suspended
- (I) Ineligible
- Injured
- Redshirt

Roster
Last update: 2000-10-18

== Awards and honors ==
- Chris Weinke, Heisman Trophy
- Chris Weinke, Sammy Baugh Trophy
- Chris Weinke, Davey O'Brien Award
- Chris Weinke, Johnny Unitas Golden Arm Award
- Jamal Reynolds, Lombardi Award

== 2000 team members in the NFL ==
| Player | Position | Round | Overall | NFL team |
|---|---|---|---|---|
| Jamal Reynolds | Defensive end | 1 | 10 | Green Bay Packers |
| Derrick Gibson | Defensive back | 1 | 28 | Oakland Raiders |
| Tommy Polley | Outside linebacker | 2 | 42 | St. Louis Rams |
| Tay Cody | Cornerback | 3 | 67 | San Diego Chargers |
| Snoop Minnis | Wide receiver | 3 | 77 | Kansas City Chiefs |
| Brian Allen | Linebacker | 3 | 83 | St. Louis Rams |
| Travis Minor | Running back | 3 | 85 | Miami Dolphins |
| Chris Weinke | Quarterback | 4 | 106 | Carolina Panthers |
| Char-ron Dorsey | Tackle | 7 | 242 | Dallas Cowboys |
