= 2000 Clemson Tigers football team =

American college football season

2000 Clemson Tigers football

Gator Bowl, L 20–41 vs. Virginia Tech
- Conference: Atlantic Coast Conference

Ranking
- Coaches: No. 14
- AP: No. 16
- Record: 9–3 (6–2 ACC)
- Head coach: Tommy Bowden (2nd season)
- Offensive coordinator: Rich Rodriguez (2nd season)
- Offensive scheme: Spread option
- Defensive coordinator: Reggie Herring (2nd season)
- Base defense: 4–3
- Captains: Chad Carson; Rod Gardner; Chad Speck
- Home stadium: Memorial Stadium

2000 Atlantic Coast Conference football standings
	Conf.			Overall
Team	W		L	W		L
No. 5 Florida State $	8	–	0	11	–	2
No. 17 Georgia Tech	6	–	2	9	–	3
No. 16 Clemson	6	–	2	9	–	3
Virginia	5	–	3	6	–	6
NC State	4	–	4	8	–	4
North Carolina	3	–	5	6	–	5
Maryland	3	–	5	5	–	6
Wake Forest	1	–	7	2	–	9
Duke	0	–	8	0	–	11
$ – BCS representative as conference champion; Rankings from AP Poll

The 2000 Clemson Tigers football team represented Clemson University as a member of the Atlantic Coast Conference (ACC) during the 2000 NCAA Division I-A football season. Led by second-year head coach Tommy Bowden, the Tigers compiled an overall record of 9–3 with a mark of 6–2 in conference play, tying for second place in the ACC. Clemson was invited to the Gator Bowl, where the Tigers lost to Virginia Tech. The team played home games at Memorial Stadium in Clemson, South Carolina.

The 54-7 loss to Florida State would be Clemson's last by 40 or more points until the 2026 season opener vs. LSU.

== Schedule ==
Date	Time	Opponent	Rank	Site	TV	Result	Attendance	Source
September 2	6:00 p.m.	The Citadel*	No. 17	Memorial Stadium; Clemson, SC		W 38–0	75,086	
September 9	3:30 p.m.	Missouri*	No. 17	Memorial Stadium; Clemson, SC	ABC	W 62–9	70,382	
September 16	1:00 p.m.	Wake Forest	No. 16	Memorial Stadium; Clemson, SC		W 55–7	72,940	
September 23	3:30 p.m.	at Virginia	No. 11	Scott Stadium; Charlottesville, VA	ABC	W 31–10	60,695	
September 30	12:00 p.m.	at Duke	No. 7	Wallace Wade Stadium; Durham, NC	JPS	W 52–22	16,872	
October 7	3:30 p.m.	NC State	No. 5	Memorial Stadium; Clemson, SC (Textile Bowl)	ABC	W 34–27	79,566	
October 14	6:00 p.m.	Maryland	No. 5	Memorial Stadium; Clemson, SC	ESPN2	W 35–14	83,752	
October 21	5:30 p.m.	at North Carolina	No. 5	Kenan Memorial Stadium; Chapel Hill, NC	ESPN2	W 38–24	55,000	
October 28	3:30 p.m.	Georgia Tech	No. 5	Memorial Stadium; Clemson, SC (rivalry)	ABC	L 28–31	81,734	
November 4	7:30 p.m.	at No. 4 Florida State	No. 10	Doak Campbell Stadium; Tallahassee, FL (rivalry)	ESPN	L 7–54	82,514	
November 18	3:30 p.m.	No. 25 South Carolina*	No. 15	Memorial Stadium; Clemson, SC (rivalry)	ABC	W 16–14	85,187	
January 1, 2001	12:30 p.m.	vs. No. 6 Virginia Tech*	No. 16	Alltel Stadium; Jacksonville, FL (Gator Bowl)	NBC	L 20–41	68,741	
*Non-conference game; Rankings from AP Poll released prior to the game; All times are in Eastern time

== Rankings ==
Ranking movements Legend: ██ Increase in ranking ██ Decrease in ranking — = Not ranked
	Week																
Poll	Pre	1	2	3	4	5	6	7	8	9	10	11	12	13	14	15	Final
AP	17	17	17	16	11	7	5	5	5	5	10	17	16	15	15	16	16
Coaches	19	18	19	16	11	8	5	4	3	4	10	15	14	12	13	13	14
BCS	Not released									7	13	—	—	13	15	15	Not released

== Roster ==
2000 Clemson Tigers football team roster
Players
Coaches
Offense

Pos.	#	Name	Class
QB	1	Woodrow Dantzler	Jr
WR	23	Rod Gardner	Sr
FB	26	Terry Witherspoon	Sr
C	59	Kyle Young	Jr

Defense

Pos.	#	Name	Class
FS	9	Robert Carswell	Sr
SS	40	Charles Hafley	Jr
LB	43	Keith Adams	Jr
DE	98	Nick Eason	So

Special teams

Pos.	#	Name	Class

Head coach

- Tommy Bowden

Coordinators/assistant coaches

Legend

- (C) Team captain
- (S) Suspended
- (I) Ineligible
- Injured
- Redshirt

Roster
Last update: 2000-10-18
