= 2000 Georgia Tech Yellow Jackets football team =

American college football season

2000 Georgia Tech Yellow Jackets football

Peach Bowl, L 14–28 vs. LSU
- Conference: Atlantic Coast Conference

Ranking
- Coaches: No. 19
- AP: No. 17
- Record: 9–3 (6–2 ACC)
- Head coach: George O'Leary (7th season)
- Offensive coordinator: Ralph Friedgen (9th season)
- Defensive coordinator: Ted Roof (2nd season)
- Home stadium: Bobby Dodd Stadium

2000 Atlantic Coast Conference football standings
	Conf.			Overall
Team	W		L	W		L
No. 5 Florida State $	8	–	0	11	–	2
No. 17 Georgia Tech	6	–	2	9	–	3
No. 16 Clemson	6	–	2	9	–	3
Virginia	5	–	3	6	–	6
NC State	4	–	4	8	–	4
North Carolina	3	–	5	6	–	5
Maryland	3	–	5	5	–	6
Wake Forest	1	–	7	2	–	9
Duke	0	–	8	0	–	11
$ – BCS representative as conference champion; Rankings from AP Poll

The 2000 Georgia Tech Yellow Jackets football team represented Georgia Tech as member of the Atlantic Coast Conference (ACC) during the 2000 NCAA Division I-A football season. Led by seventh-year head coach George O'Leary, the Yellow Jackets compiled an overall record of 9–3 with a mark of 6–2 in conference play, tying for second place in the ACC. Georgia Tech was invited to the Peach Bowl, where the Yellow Jackets lost to LSU. The team played home games at Bobby Dodd Stadium in Atlanta.

== Schedule ==
Date	Time	Opponent	Rank	Site	TV	Result	Attendance	Source
August 27	8:00 p.m.	at No. 11 Virginia Tech*		Lane Stadium; Blacksburg, VA (BCA Classic)	ESPN2	Cancelled	56,276	
September 2	7:00 pm	UCF*		Bobby Dodd Stadium; Atlanta, GA		W 21–17	40,993	
September 9	8:00 pm	No. 2 Florida State		Bobby Dodd Stadium; Atlanta, GA	ABC	L 21–26	46,381	
September 16	3:30 pm	Navy*		Bobby Dodd Stadium; Atlanta, GA	HTS	W 40–13	46,032	
September 21	8:00 pm	at NC State		Carter–Finley Stadium; Raleigh, NC	ESPN	L 23–30 ^{OT}	49,857	
September 30	3:30 pm	at North Carolina		Kenan Memorial Stadium; Chapel Hill, NC	ABC	W 42–28	52,000	
October 14	12:00 pm	Wake Forest^{†}		Bobby Dodd Stadium; Atlanta, GA	JPS	W 52–20	43,829	
October 21	12:00 pm	Duke		Bobby Dodd Stadium; Atlanta, GA	JPS	W 45–10	36,908	
October 28	3:30 pm	at No. 5 Clemson		Memorial Stadium; Clemson, SC (rivalry)	ABC	W 31–28	81,734	
November 9	8:00 pm	Virginia	No. 24	Bobby Dodd Stadium; Atlanta, GA	ESPN	W 35–0	41,885	
November 18	12:00 pm	at Maryland	No. 20	Byrd Stadium; College Park, MD	JPS	W 35–22	24,701	
November 25	12:00 pm	at No. 19 Georgia*	No. 18	Sanford Stadium; Athens, GA (Clean, Old-Fashioned Hate)	CBS	W 27–15	85,912	
December 29	5:00 pm	vs. LSU*	No. 15	Georgia Dome; Atlanta, GA (Peach Bowl)	ESPN	L 14–28	73,614	
*Non-conference game; ^{†}Homecoming; Rankings from AP Poll released prior to the game; All times are in Eastern time

The Yellow Jackets were scheduled to open the season on August 27 against Virginia Tech at Lane Stadium in Blacksburg, Virginia in the BCA Classic, but lightning struck around the stadium as the teams were lining up for kickoff. The game eventually was canceled after a lengthy delay.

== Rankings ==
Ranking movements Legend: ██ Increase in ranking ██ Decrease in ranking — = Not ranked
	Week																
Poll	Pre	1	2	3	4	5	6	7	8	9	10	11	12	13	14	15	Final
AP	—	—	—	—	—	—	—	—	—	—	25	22	20	18	17	15	17
Coaches Poll	—	—	—	—	—	—	—	—	—	—	—	—	22	19	18	17	19
BCS	Not released									—	—	—	—	—	13	13	Not released

== Roster ==
2000 Georgia Tech Yellow Jackets football team roster
Players
Coaches
Offense

Pos.	#	Name	Class
RB	35	Joe Burns	Jr
WR	6	Kelly Campbell	Jr
QB	11	George Godsey	Jr

Defense

Pos.	#	Name	Class
DT	96	Gary Johnson	So
FS	21	Marty O'Leary	Jr
DE	38	Nick Rogers	Jr

Special teams

Pos.	#	Name	Class

Head coach

- George O'Leary

Coordinators/assistant coaches

- Ralph Friedgen – Offensive coordinator/quarterbacks
- Bill O'Brien – Running backs/recruiting coordinator
- David Kelly – Wide receivers
- Eddie Wilson
- Mac McWhorter – Offensive line
- Ted Roof – Defensive coordinator/linebackers
- Danny Crossman – Defensive ends/special teams
- Paul Ferraro – Defensive backs

Legend

- (C) Team captain
- (S) Suspended
- (I) Ineligible
- Injured
- Redshirt
