= 2000 Virginia Cavaliers football team =

American college football season

2000 Virginia Cavaliers football

Oahu Bowl, L 14–27 vs. Georgia
- Conference: Atlantic Coast Conference
- Record: 6–6 (5–3 ACC)
- Head coach: George Welsh (19th season)
- Offensive coordinator: Gary Tranquill (6th season)
- Defensive coordinator: Rick Lantz (10th season)
- Captains: Brad Barnes; Yubrenal Isabelle; Byron Thweatt; Patrick Washington
- Home stadium: Scott Stadium

2000 Atlantic Coast Conference football standings
	Conf.			Overall
Team	W		L	W		L
No. 5 Florida State $	8	–	0	11	–	2
No. 17 Georgia Tech	6	–	2	9	–	3
No. 16 Clemson	6	–	2	9	–	3
Virginia	5	–	3	6	–	6
NC State	4	–	4	8	–	4
North Carolina	3	–	5	6	–	5
Maryland	3	–	5	5	–	6
Wake Forest	1	–	7	2	–	9
Duke	0	–	8	0	–	11
$ – BCS representative as conference champion; Rankings from AP Poll

The 2000 Virginia Cavaliers football team represented the University of Virginia as a member of the Atlantic Coast Conference (ACC) during the 2000 NCAA Division I-A football season. Led by George Welsh in his 19th and final season as head coach, the Cavaliers compiled an overall record of 6–6 with a mark of 5–3 in conference play, placing fourth in the ACC. Virginia was invited to the Oahu Bowl, where the Cavaliers lost to Georgia. The team played home games at Scott Stadium in Charlottesville, Virginia.

== Schedule ==
Date	Time	Opponent	Site	TV	Result	Attendance	Source
September 2	3:30 pm	BYU*	Scott Stadium; Charlottesville, VA (Jim Thorpe Classic)	ABC	L 35–38 ^{OT}	60,435	
September 9	3:30 pm	Richmond*	Scott Stadium; Charlottesville, VA		W 34–6	50,285	
September 16	6:00 pm	at Duke	Wallace Wade Stadium; Durham, NC		W 26–10	18,776	
September 23	3:30 pm	No. 11 Clemson^{†}	Scott Stadium; Charlottesville, VA	ABC	L 10–31	60,695	
September 30	6:30 pm	at Wake Forest	Groves Stadium; Winston-Salem, NC		W 27–10	20,151	
October 7	12:00 pm	Maryland	Scott Stadium; Charlottesville, VA (rivalry)	JPS	W 31–23	53,655	
October 21	3:30 pm	at No. 6 Florida State	Doak Campbell Stadium; Tallahassee, FL (Jefferson–Eppes Trophy)	ABC	L 3–37	79,121	
October 28	12:00 pm	North Carolina	Scott Stadium; Charlottesville, VA (South's Oldest Rivalry)	JPS	W 17–6	56,692	
November 9	8:00 pm	at Georgia Tech	Bobby Dodd Stadium; Atlanta, GA	ESPN	L 0–35	41,885	
November 18	2:30 pm	NC State	Scott Stadium; Charlottesville, VA		W 24–17	55,861	
November 25	7:30 pm	at No. 6 Virginia Tech*	Lane Stadium; Blacksburg, VA (rivalry)	ESPN	L 21–42	56,272	
December 24	8:30 pm	vs. No. 24 Georgia*	Aloha Stadium; Halawa, HI (Oahu Bowl)	ESPN	L 14–37	24,187	
*Non-conference game; ^{†}Homecoming; Rankings from AP Poll released prior to the game; All times are in Eastern time

== Roster ==
2000 Virginia Cavaliers football team roster
Players
Coaches
Offense

Pos.	#	Name	Class
RB	1	Antwoine Womack	Jr
QB	3	Bryson Spinner	Fr
QB	7	Matt Schaub	Fr
WR	11	Billy McMullen	So
FB	41	Patrick Washington	Sr
TE	81	Chris Luzar	Jr
TE	87	Billy Baber	Sr

Defense

Pos.	#	Name	Class
LB	32	Byron Thweatt	Sr
LB	33	Donny Green	Sr
LB	39	Angelo Crowell	So
DT	98	Monsanto Pope	Jr

Special teams

Pos.	#	Name	Class

Head coach

- George Welsh

Coordinators/assistant coaches

Legend

- (C) Team captain
- (S) Suspended
- (I) Ineligible
- Injured
- Redshirt

Roster
