= Carl Franks =

American football player and coach (born 1960)

Biographical details
- Born: December 1, 1960 (age 65)

Playing career
- 1980–1982: Duke
- 1983–1984: Tampa Bay Bandits
- Positions: Running back, tight end

Coaching career (HC unless noted)
- 1985: Tampa Bay Bandits (RB)
- 1986: VMI (WR/TE)
- 1987–1989: Duke (RB)
- 1990–1992: Florida (RB)
- 1993: Florida (TE)
- 1994: Florida (ILB)
- 1995–1998: Florida (OC/RB)
- 1999–2003: Duke
- 2004–2012: South Florida (RB)
- 2014–2022: Bethune–Cookman (RB)

Head coaching record
- Overall: 7–45

Carl Franks (born December 1, 1960) is an American former college football coach and player. He most recently served as the running backs coach at Bethune–Cookman University. Franks served as the head football coach at Duke University from 1999 to 2003, compiling a record of 7–45. He played football at Duke where he was an Academic All-ACC selection.

== Coaching career ==
Franks was as an assistant coach under Steve Spurrier for 12 years. He served as Spurrier's running backs coach with the United States Football League's Tampa Bay Bandits in 1985, at Duke from 1987 to 1989 and at the University of Florida from 1990 to 1992 and again from 1995 to 1998, serving as the position coach for future National Football League Pro Bowler Fred Taylor. He was Florida's tight ends coach in 1993 and inside linebackers coach in 1994.

Franks then served as the 19th head coach of his alma mater, Duke, from 1999 to 2003. Appointed as head coach on his 38th birthday, he was dismissed five years later after amassing a 7–45 record, including 0–11 seasons in 2000 and 2001. Despite the poor record, Franks was lauded for the academic success of his players, and his program won the Academic Achievement Award from the American Football Coaches Association in 2003.

Franks was the running backs coach at the University of South Florida from 2004 to 2012 under head coaches Jim Leavitt and Skip Holtz. He was the Bulls' interim head coach for six days in January 2010, overseeing the day-to-day operations of the program, between the firing of Jim Leavitt and the hiring of Skip Holtz. After Holtz's firing in December 2012, new head coach Willie Taggart did not retain Franks on his staff. After spending the 2013 season out of coaching, in 2014, Franks was named running backs coach at Bethune-Cookman.

== Head coaching record ==
Year	Team	Overall	Conference	Standing	Bowl/playoffs
Duke Blue Devils (Atlantic Coast Conference) (1999–2003)
1999	Duke	3–8	3–5	T–5th	
2000	Duke	0–11	0–8	9th	
2001	Duke	0–11	0–8	9th	
2002	Duke	2–10	0–8	9th	
2003	Duke	2–5*	0–4*	*	
Duke:		7–45	3–33	*Final 5 games coached by Ted Roof	
Total:		7–45			
