= 2000 North Carolina Tar Heels football team =

American college football season

2000 North Carolina Tar Heels football
- Conference: Atlantic Coast Conference
- Record: 6–5 (3–5 ACC)
- Head coach: Carl Torbush (3rd season)
- Offensive coordinator: Mike O'Cain (1st season)
- Offensive scheme: Multiple
- Defensive coordinator: Ken Browning (1st season)
- Base defense: 4–3
- Captains: Alge Crumpler; Ronald Curry; Sedrick Hodge; Brandon Spoon
- Home stadium: Kenan Memorial Stadium

2000 Atlantic Coast Conference football standings
	Conf.			Overall
Team	W		L	W		L
No. 5 Florida State $	8	–	0	11	–	2
No. 17 Georgia Tech	6	–	2	9	–	3
No. 16 Clemson	6	–	2	9	–	3
Virginia	5	–	3	6	–	6
NC State	4	–	4	8	–	4
North Carolina	3	–	5	6	–	5
Maryland	3	–	5	5	–	6
Wake Forest	1	–	7	2	–	9
Duke	0	–	8	0	–	11
$ – BCS representative as conference champion; Rankings from AP Poll

The 2000 North Carolina Tar Heels football team represented the University of North Carolina at Chapel Hill as a member of the Atlantic Coast Conference ACC) during the 2000 NCAA Division I-A football season. Led by third-year head coach Carl Torbush, the Tar Heels played their home games at Kenan Memorial Stadium in Chapel Hill, North Carolina. North Carolina finished the season 6–5 overall and 3–5 in ACC play to tie for sixth place. Torbush was fired following the season.

== Schedule ==
Date	Time	Opponent	Site	TV	Result	Attendance
September 2	6:00 p.m.	Tulsa*	Kenan Memorial Stadium; Chapel Hill, NC		W 30–9	44,000
September 9	6:30 p.m.	at Wake Forest	Groves Stadium (II); Winston-Salem, NC (rivalry)		W 35–14	30,087
September 16	3:30 p.m.	at No. 2 Florida State	Doak Campbell Stadium; Tallahassee, FL	ABC	L 14–63	79,287
September 23	6:00 p.m.	Marshall*	Kenan Memorial Stadium; Chapel Hill, NC		W 20–15	53,000
September 30	3:30 p.m.	Georgia Tech	Kenan Memorial Stadium; Chapel Hill, NC	ABC	L 28–42	52,000
October 14	3:30 p.m.	NC State	Kenan Memorial Stadium; Chapel Hill, NC (rivalry)	ABC	L 20–38	59,000
October 21	5:30 p.m.	No. 5 Clemson	Kenan Memorial Stadium; Chapel Hill, NC	ESPN2	L 24–38	55,000
October 28	12:00 p.m.	at Virginia	Scott Stadium; Charlottesville, VA (South's Oldest Rivalry)	JPS	L 6–17	56,692
November 4	6:30 p.m.	at Pittsburgh*	Three Rivers Stadium; Pittsburgh, PA	ESPN2	W 20–17	43,872
November 11	12:00 p.m.	Maryland^{†}	Kenan Memorial Stadium; Chapel Hill, NC	JPS	W 13–10	40,000
November 18	12:00 p.m.	at Duke	Wallace Wade Stadium; Durham, NC (Victory Bell)	JPS	W 59–21	24,673
*Non-conference game; ^{†}Homecoming; Rankings from AP Poll released prior to the game; All times are in Eastern time

== Roster ==
2000 North Carolina Tar Heels football team roster
Players
Coaches
Offense

Pos.	#	Name	Class
QB	1	Ronald Curry	Jr
WR	8	Jamal Jones	Fr
QB	9	Luke Huard	So
TE	82	Alge Crumpler	Sr
WR	88	Sam Aiken	So

Defense

Pos.	#	Name	Class
CB	27	Jason Horton	So
LB	30	David Thornton	Jr
LB	41	Quincy Monk	Jr
LB	44	Brandon Spoon	Sr
DE	49	Julius Peppers	So
DT	87	Ryan Sims	Jr

Special teams

Pos.	#	Name	Class
K	92	Jeff Reed	Jr

Head coach

- Carl Torbush

Coordinators/assistant coaches

Legend

- (C) Team captain
- (S) Suspended
- (I) Ineligible
- Injured
- Redshirt

Roster

== Coaching staff ==
Name	Position	Seasons in Position
Carl Torbush	Head coach	3rd
Gunter Brewer	Wide Receivers	1st
	Defensive tackles	1st
Ken Browning	Tight Ends /	7th
	Strength and conditioning coordinator	1st
Ron Case	Defensive Backs / special teams coordinator	5th
Robbie Caldwell	Offensive Line	1st
	Defensive coordinator / Linebackers	1st
Darrell Moody	Running backs/ recruiting coordinator	11th
Mike O'Cain	Offensive coordinator / quarterbacks	1st
NA	Defensive ends	1st
