= 2000 Maryland Terrapins football team =

American college football season

2000 Maryland Terrapins football
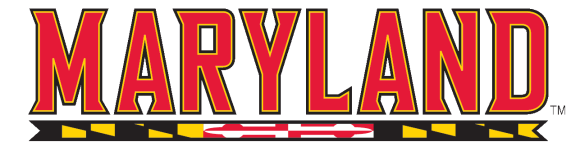
- Conference: Atlantic Coast Conference
- Record: 5–6 (3–5 ACC)
- Head coach: Ron Vanderlinden (4th season)
- Offensive coordinator: Bob Heffner (2nd season)
- Defensive coordinator: Wally Ake (4th season)
- Home stadium: Byrd Stadium

2000 Atlantic Coast Conference football standings
	Conf.			Overall
Team	W		L	W		L
No. 5 Florida State $	8	–	0	11	–	2
No. 17 Georgia Tech	6	–	2	9	–	3
No. 16 Clemson	6	–	2	9	–	3
Virginia	5	–	3	6	–	6
NC State	4	–	4	8	–	4
North Carolina	3	–	5	6	–	5
Maryland	3	–	5	5	–	6
Wake Forest	1	–	7	2	–	9
Duke	0	–	8	0	–	11
$ – BCS representative as conference champion; Rankings from AP Poll

The 2000 Maryland Terrapins football team represented the University of Maryland in the 2000 NCAA Division I-A football season. In their fourth and final season under head coach Ron Vanderlinden, the Terrapins compiled a 5–6 record, finished in seventh place in the Atlantic Coast Conference, and were outscored by their opponents 284 to 247. The team's statistical leaders included Calvin McCall with 1,533 passing yards, LaMont Jordan with 920 rushing yards, and Guilian Gary with 568 receiving yards.

== Schedule ==
Date	Time	Opponent	Site	TV	Result	Attendance
September 9	6:00 p.m.	Temple*	Byrd Stadium; College Park, MD		W 17–10	46,950
September 16	12:00 p.m.	at West Virginia*	Mountaineer Field; Morgantown, WV (rivalry)	ESPN2	L 17–30	53,007
September 23		Middle Tennessee*	Byrd Stadium; College Park, MD		W 45–27	31,136
September 28	12:00 p.m.	No. 2 Florida State	Byrd Stadium; College Park, MD	ESPN	L 7–59	47,044
October 7	12:00 p.m.	at Virginia	Scott Stadium; Charlottesville, VA (rivalry)	JPS	L 23–31	53,655
October 14	6:00 p.m.	at No. 5 Clemson	Memorial Stadium; Clemson, SC	ESPN2	L 14–35	83,752
October 21	1:00 p.m.	Wake Forest	Byrd Stadium; College Park, MD		W 37–7	26,544
October 28	12:00 p.m.	at Duke	Wallace Wade Stadium; Durham, NC	JPS	W 20–9	20,033
November 4	3:30 p.m.	NC State	Byrd Stadium; College Park, MD	ABC	W 35–28 ^{2OT}	28,410
November 11	12:00 p.m.	at North Carolina	Kenan Memorial Stadium; Chapel Hill, NC	JPS	L 10–13	40,000
November 18	12:00 p.m.	No. 20 Georgia Tech	Byrd Stadium; College Park, MD	JPS	L 22–35	24,701
*Non-conference game; Rankings from AP Poll released prior to the game; All times are in Eastern time

== Roster ==
2000 Maryland Terrapins football team roster
Players
Coaches
Offense

Pos.	#	Name	Class
FB	5	James Lynch	Fr
RB	7	Bruce Perry	Fr
QB	14	Shaun Hill	Jr
RB	15	LaMont Jordan	Sr
WR	21	Guilian Gary	Jr
C	67	Melvin Fowler	Jr
OT	78	Matt Crawford	So
WR	81	Kevin Collins	Sr
TE	82	Jeff Dugan	Fr
TE	88	Matt Murphy	Jr

Defense

Pos.	#	Name	Class
CB	11	Tony Okanlawon	Jr
CB	19	Richard Harrigan	Jr
CB	30	Curome Cox	Fr
LB	32	Leon Joe	Fr
DB	28	Mohammad Emamhosseini	Jr
SS	34	Madieu Williams	So
LB	42	E. J. Henderson	So
DT	57	Kris Jenkins	Sr
DT	98	Charles Hill	Jr

Special teams

Pos.	#	Name	Class
P	16	Brooks Barnard	So

Head coach

- Ron Vanderlinden

Coordinators/assistant coaches

Legend

- (C) Team captain
- (S) Suspended
- (I) Ineligible
- Injured
- Redshirt

Roster
Last update: 2000-12-08
