= 2000 Peach Bowl =

American college football game

2000 Chick-fil-A Peach Bowl
- 33rd Peach Bowl
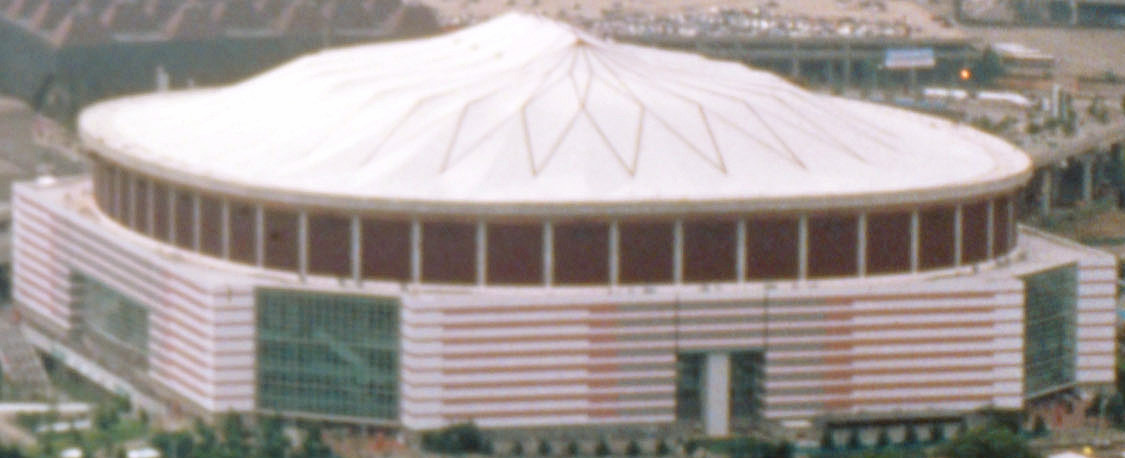
- The Georgia Dome in Atlanta, Georgia, hosted the Peach Bowl.
LSU Tigers	Georgia Tech Yellow Jackets
(7–4)	(9–2)
SEC	ACC
28	14
Head coach: Nick Saban	Head coach: George O'Leary
	AP / Coaches / BCS; 15 / 17 / 13
	1	2	3	4	Total
LSU	3	0	6	19	28
Georgia Tech	7	7	0	0	14
- Date: December 29, 2000
- Season: 2000
- Stadium: Georgia Dome
- Location: Atlanta, Georgia
- Referee: Randy Simms (C-USA)
- Attendance: 73,614

United States TV coverage
- Network: ESPN
- Announcers: Ron Franklin, Mike Gottfried, and Adrian Karsten (sideline)

The 2000 Peach Bowl was the 33rd Peach Bowl game and featured the LSU Tigers, and the Georgia Tech Yellow Jackets.

LSU scored first on a 32-yard John Corbello field goal to take a 3–0 lead. Georgia Tech responded with a 32-yard Joe Burns touchdown run to take a 7–3 lead. In the second quarter, Jermaine Hatch scored on a 9-yard touchdown run, giving Tech a 14–3 lead.

In the third quarter, Rohan Davey threw a 3-yard touchdown pass to Tommy Banks, as LSU got within 14–9. In the fourth quarter, Davey threw a 9-yard touchdown pass to Josh Reed giving LSU a 17–14 lead. John Corbello kicked a 49-yard field goal giving the Tigers a 20–14 advantage. Davey later threw a 3-yard touchdown pass to Tommy Banks as LSU won by a 28-14 count.
