= 2000 Wake Forest Demon Deacons football team =

American college football season

2000 Wake Forest Demon Deacons football
- Conference: Atlantic Coast Conference
- Record: 2–9 (1–7 ACC)
- Head coach: Jim Caldwell (8th season)
- Offensive coordinator: Eddie Williamson (3rd season)
- Offensive scheme: Pro-style
- Co-defensive coordinators: Tony Pierce (1st season); Theo Lemon (1st season)
- Base defense: 4–3
- Captains: Nick Bender; Michael Koch; Bryan Ray
- Home stadium: Groves Stadium

2000 Atlantic Coast Conference football standings
	Conf.			Overall
Team	W		L	W		L
No. 5 Florida State $	8	–	0	11	–	2
No. 17 Georgia Tech	6	–	2	9	–	3
No. 16 Clemson	6	–	2	9	–	3
Virginia	5	–	3	6	–	6
NC State	4	–	4	8	–	4
North Carolina	3	–	5	6	–	5
Maryland	3	–	5	5	–	6
Wake Forest	1	–	7	2	–	9
Duke	0	–	8	0	–	11
$ – BCS representative as conference champion; Rankings from AP Poll

The 2000 Wake Forest Demon Deacons football team was an American football team that represented Wake Forest University during the 2000 NCAA Division I-A football season. In their eighth season under head coach Jim Caldwell, the Demon Deacons compiled a 2–9 record, were outscored by a total of 362 to 181, and finished in eighth place in the Atlantic Coast Conference.

The team's statistical leaders included James MacPherson (1,324 passing yards), Tarence Williams (661 rushing yards), and Fabian Davis (596 receiving yards).

The team played its home games at Groves Stadium in Winston-Salem, North Carolina.

== Schedule ==
Date	Time	Opponent	Site	TV	Result	Attendance	Source
August 31	7:30 pm	Appalachian State*	Groves Stadium; Winston-Salem, NC		L 16–20	26,853	
September 9	6:30 pm	North Carolina	Groves Stadium; Winston-Salem, NC (rivalry)		L 14–35	30,087	
September 16	1:00 pm	at No. 16 Clemson	Memorial Stadium; Clemson, SC		L 7–55	72,940	
September 30	6:30 pm	Virginia	Groves Stadium; Winston-Salem, NC		L 10–27	20,151	
October 7	3:30 pm	Vanderbilt*	Groves Stadium; Winston-Salem, NC		L 10–17	18,213	
October 14	12:00 pm	at Georgia Tech	Bobby Dodd Stadium; Atlanta, GA	JPS	L 20–52	43,829	
October 21	1:00 pm	at Maryland	Byrd Stadium; College Park, MD		L 7–37	26,544	
November 4	12:00 pm	Duke	Groves Stadium; Winston-Salem, NC (rivalry)	JPS	W 28–26	19,224	
November 11	3:30 pm	No. 3 Florida State	Groves Stadium; Winston-Salem, NC	PPV	L 6–35	27,071	
November 18	12:00 pm	at Navy*	Navy–Marine Corps Memorial Stadium; Annapolis, MD		W 49–26	30,370	
November 25	12:00 pm	at NC State	Carter–Finley Stadium; Raleigh, NC (rivalry)	ESPN	L 14–32	29,821	
*Non-conference game; Rankings from AP Poll released prior to the game; All times are in Eastern time

== Team leaders ==
Category	Team Leader	Att/Cth	Yds
Passing	James MacPherson	113/207	1,324
Rushing	Tarence Williams	130	661
Receiving	Ira Williams	45	495
