= 2000 NC State Wolfpack football team =

American college football season

2000 NC State Wolfpack football

MicronPC.com Bowl champion

MicronPC.com Bowl, W 38–30 vs. Minnesota
- Conference: Atlantic Coast Conference
- Record: 8–4 (4–4 ACC)
- Head coach: Chuck Amato (1st season)
- Offensive coordinator: Norm Chow (1st season)
- Defensive coordinator: Buddy Green (5th season)
- Home stadium: Carter–Finley Stadium

2000 Atlantic Coast Conference football standings
	Conf.			Overall
Team	W		L	W		L
No. 5 Florida State $	8	–	0	11	–	2
No. 17 Georgia Tech	6	–	2	9	–	3
No. 16 Clemson	6	–	2	9	–	3
Virginia	5	–	3	6	–	6
NC State	4	–	4	8	–	4
North Carolina	3	–	5	6	–	5
Maryland	3	–	5	5	–	6
Wake Forest	1	–	7	2	–	9
Duke	0	–	8	0	–	11
$ – BCS representative as conference champion; Rankings from AP Poll

The 2000 NC State Wolfpack football team represented North Carolina State University during the 2000 NCAA Division I-A football season. The team's head coach was Chuck Amato. NC State has been a member of the Atlantic Coast Conference (ACC) since the league's inception in 1953. The Wolfpack played its home games in 2000 at Carter–Finley Stadium in Raleigh, North Carolina, which has been NC State football's home stadium since 1966.

== Schedule ==
Date	Time	Opponent	Rank	Site	TV	Result	Attendance
September 2	7:00 pm	Arkansas State*		Carter–Finley Stadium; Raleigh, North Carolina		W 38–31 ^{2OT}	46,973
September 9	12:00 pm	at Indiana*		Memorial Stadium; Bloomington, Indiana	ESPN2	W 41–38	30,151
September 16	7:00 pm	SMU*		Carter–Finley Stadium; Raleigh, North Carolina		W 41–0	50,034
September 21	8:00 pm	Georgia Tech		Carter-Finley Stadium; Raleigh, North Carolina	ESPN	W 30–23 ^{OT}	49,857
October 7	3:30 pm	at No. 5 Clemson		Memorial Stadium; Clemson, South Carolina (Textile Bowl)	ABC	L 27–34	79,566
October 14	3:30 pm	at North Carolina		Kenan Memorial Stadium; Chapel Hill, North Carolina (rivalry)	ABC	W 38–20	59,000
October 28	7:00 pm	No. 6 Florida State	No. 21	Carter–Finley Stadium; Raleigh, North Carolina	ESPN	L 14–58	52,384
November 4	3:30 pm	at Maryland		Byrd Stadium; College Park, Maryland	ABC	L 28–35 ^{2OT}	28,410
November 11	1:00 pm	Duke^{†}		Carter–Finley Stadium; Raleigh, North Carolina (rivalry)		W 35–31	51,680
November 18	2:30 pm	at Virginia		Scott Stadium; Charlottesville, Virginia		L 17–24	55,861
November 25	12:00 pm	Wake Forest		Carter–Finley Stadium; Raleigh, North Carolina (rivalry)	ESPN	W 32–14	29,821
December 28	7:00 pm	vs. Minnesota*		Pro Player Stadium; Miami Gardens, Florida (MicronPC.com Bowl)	TBS	W 38–30	28,359
*Non-conference game; ^{†}Homecoming; Rankings from AP Poll released prior to the game; All times are in Eastern time

== Roster ==
2000 NC State Wolfpack football team roster
Players
Coaches
Offense

Pos.	#	Name	Class
WR	3	Koren Robinson	So
QB	17	Philip Rivers	Fr
G	54	Sean Locklear	Fr
WR	82	Jerricho Cotchery	Fr

Defense

Pos.	#	Name	Class
SS	9	Terrence Holt	So
SS		Adrian Wilson	Jr
LB	44	Levar Fisher	Jr
LB		Clayton White	Sr

Special teams

Pos.	#	Name	Class

Head coach

- Chuck Amato

Coordinators/assistant coaches

- Norm Chow – Offensive coordinator/quarterbacks
- Doc Holliday – Asst. Head coach/Wide receivers
- Todd Stroud – Strength and conditioning
- Manny Diaz – Graduate assistant

Legend

- (C) Team captain
- (S) Suspended
- (I) Ineligible
- Injured
- Redshirt

== Rankings ==
Ranking movements Legend: ██ Increase in ranking ██ Decrease in ranking — = Not ranked
	Week																
Poll	Pre	1	2	3	4	5	6	7	8	9	10	11	12	13	14	15	Final
AP	—	—	—	—	—	—	—	—	24	21	—	—	—	—	—	—	—
Coaches Poll	—	—	—	—	—	—	—	—	25	22	—	—	—	—	—	—	—
BCS	Not released									—	—	—	—	—	—	—	Not released

== Awards and honors ==
- Levar Fisher – ACC Defensive Player of the Year
- Philip Rivers – ACC Rookie of the Year

== Team players in the 2001 NFL draft ==
Player	Position	Round	Pick	NFL club
Koren Robinson	Wide receiver	1	9	Seattle Seahawks
Adrian Wilson	Strong safety	3	64	Arizona Cardinals
