= Tommy Bowden =

American football player and coach (born 1954)

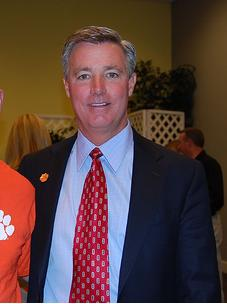
- Bowden in 2010

Biographical details
- Born: July 10, 1954 (age 72); Birmingham, Alabama, U.S.

Playing career
- 1973–1976: West Virginia
- Position: Wide receiver

Coaching career (HC unless noted)
- 1977: West Virginia (GA)
- 1978–1979: Florida State (DB)
- 1980: Auburn (RB)
- 1981–1982: Florida State (TE)
- 1983–1984: Duke (QB)
- 1985–1986: Duke (OC)
- 1987–1989: Alabama (WR)
- 1990: Kentucky (OC)
- 1991–1996: Auburn (OC)
- 1997–1998: Tulane
- 1999–2008: Clemson

Head coaching record
- Overall: 90–49

Accomplishments and honors

Championships
- 1 C-USA (1998)

Awards
- C-USA Coach of the Year (1998); 2× ACC Coach of the Year (1999, 2003)

Tommy Pearce Bowden (/ˈbaʊdən/; born July 10, 1954) is an American former college football coach. He served as the head coach at Clemson University from 1999 until October 13, 2008. He is a son of Bobby Bowden, former head football coach of Florida State University, against whom he coached in games nicknamed the "Bowden Bowl." He is also a brother of Terry Bowden, who served as the head coach of Auburn.

== Coaching career ==
Before going to Clemson, Bowden was the head coach at Tulane University, and an assistant at the University of Alabama, Auburn University, Duke University, the University of Kentucky, East Carolina University and, with his father, at Florida State. His 1998 Tulane squad went 12–0 and achieved a top-10 final ranking in both polls. Despite being one of only two undefeated teams in the regular season, Tulane was not even considered for a bid in a Bowl Championship Series game because it was believed they had not played a difficult schedule.

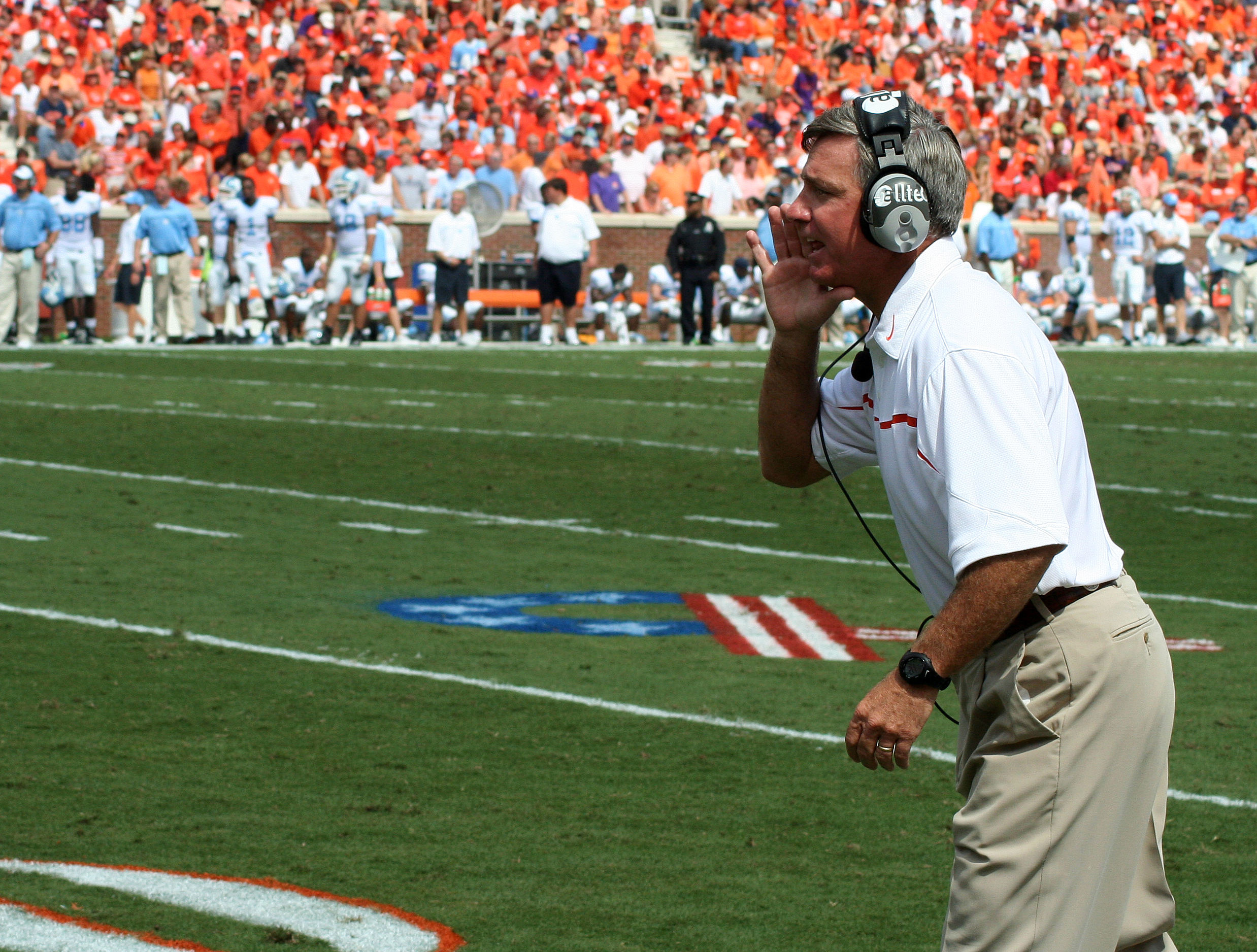
Bowden in 2006 as Clemson's head coach.

Bowden was hired as Clemson's head coach before the 1999 season, making him the first coach in 47 years to leave Tulane with a winning record. Bowden's Clemson teams went to a bowl game every year he coached there, except in 2004, when, after a brawl with rival South Carolina, both teams withdrew from bowl consideration for that season. He resigned on October 13, 2008, after leading the team to a disappointing 3–3 record (1–2 ACC) at the midpoint of a season in which the Tigers had been an almost unanimous preseason pick to win their first ACC title under Bowden and were ranked #9 in the preseason polls. Assistant head coach/wide receivers coach Dabo Swinney was named as interim head coach for the remainder of the season. In ten seasons, Bowden led the Tigers to zero conference championships, finishing only as high as second in the conference twice and second in the Atlantic division three times.

== Personal ==
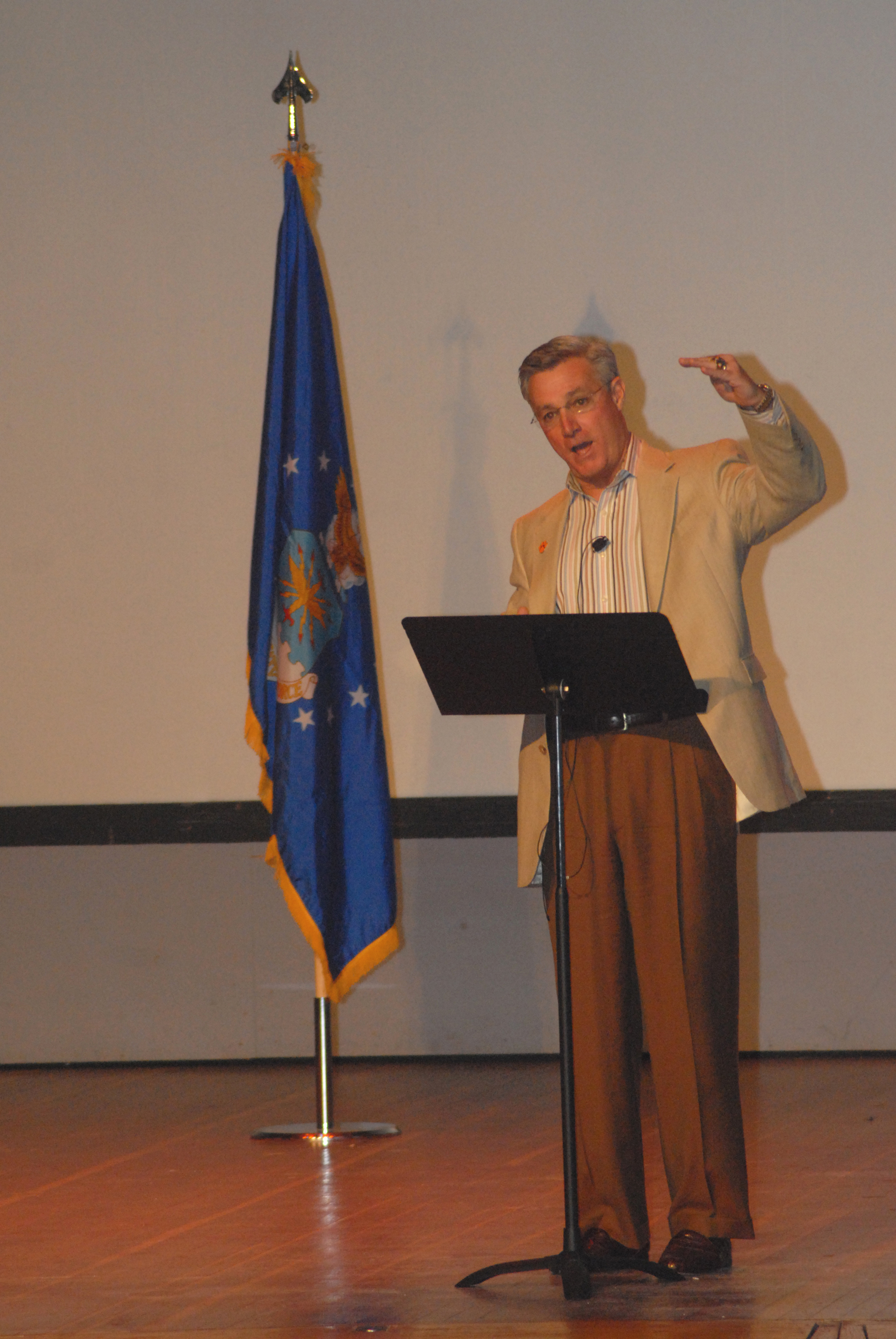
Bowden, an evangelical Christian, addresses airmen at Pope Field in celebration of the National Prayer Luncheon in 2008.

Bowden attended and played football for West Virginia University from 1972 through 1976. He is married to Linda White and has two children, Ryan and Lauren. He is a son of former Florida State Seminoles head coach, the late Bobby Bowden and has two sisters and three brothers, including Terry, former head coach at Auburn University, and Jeff, who served as an assistant coach on his brother Terry's staff. Bowden is an evangelical Christian.

== Head coaching record ==
Year	Team	Overall	Conference	Standing	Bowl/playoffs	Coaches^{#}	AP^{°}
Tulane Green Wave (Conference USA) (1997–1998)
1997	Tulane	7–4	5–1	2nd			
1998	Tulane	11–0	6–0	1st	Liberty	7	7
Tulane:		18–4	11–1				
Clemson Tigers (Atlantic Coast Conference) (1999–2008)
1999	Clemson	6–6	5–3	T–2nd	L Peach		
2000	Clemson	9–3	6–2	T–2nd	L Gator	14	16
2001	Clemson	7–5	4–4	T–4th	W Humanitarian		
2002	Clemson	7–6	4–4	T–5th	L Tangerine		
2003	Clemson	9–4	5–3	3rd	W Peach	22	22
2004	Clemson	6–5	4–4	T–6th	Declined*		
2005	Clemson	8–4	4–4	3rd (Atlantic)	W Champs Sports	21	21
2006	Clemson	8–5	5–3	T–2nd (Atlantic)	L Music City		
2007	Clemson	9–4	5–3	2nd (Atlantic)	L Chick-fil-A	22	21
2008	Clemson	3–3^{‡}	1–2	T–2nd (Atlantic)			
Clemson:		72–45	43–32				
Total:		90–49					
National championship Conference title Conference division title or championship game berth
^{#}Rankings from final Coaches Poll.; ^{°}Rankings from final AP Poll.

*Self-imposed punishment for team fight with South Carolina
^{‡} Bowden resigned on October 13, 2008.
