= Black Coaches & Administrators =

North American non-profit

The Black Coaches & Administrators (BCA) is a non-profit organization whose primary purpose is "to foster the growth and development of ethnic minorities at all levels of sports both nationally and internationally". It currently is focused on athletics in North America, including professional leagues, college sports and high school athletics. The organization offers scholarships and actively promotes the hiring of ethnic minority coaches in professional and college sports.

The BCA was formed in 1988 as the Black Coaches Association, when two separate African American coaching groups (basketball and American football) merged and extended their work to coaches in all sports. The organization has been focused on improving the employment opportunities and professional development of ethnic minority coaches. Initially the organizations focus was on African Americans, but it has since expanded to all minority ethnic groups. On May 31, 2007, the name was officially changed to the Black Coaches & Administrators to clarify the expanding membership population of administrators and coaches within the BCA.

The BCA has long been highly critical of the lack of African American, and minority coaches in general, in college football—particularly in the highest, NCAA Division I FBS level. Noting the high number of African American players in college football, the BCA has been concerned that there have only been 19 African American FBS college head coaches ever. However, the group's president expressed optimism for the future in December 2009 after African Americans were hired for three FBS head coaching vacancies immediately after the 2009 season, and two more African Americans interviewed for open positions at BCS conference programs. The three hirings brought the total number of black FBS head coaches from 7 to 10, with the total increasing to 11 days later when one of the interviewees was hired. By the end of December, the number went to 12 when Kentucky replaced its retiring coach with his designated successor.

In 2015, the organization changed its name to Advocates for Athletic Equity (AAE) and expanded its role to promote the hiring of coaches and administrators of any ethnic minority in all sports. In addition to releasing reports on minority coaching hiring, the organization hosts several career development events for minority coaches. AAE closed in 2016.

== BCA Classic ==
The BCA has sponsored college athletic events, the BCA Classics, in both basketball and football.

=== Basketball ===

The BCA Classic is an annual men's college basketball tournament held at various locations throughout the United States since 1994. Initially featuring a four teams playing two separate games, the field began expanding to a tournament format in 2000, to eight teams in 2004.

=== Football ===
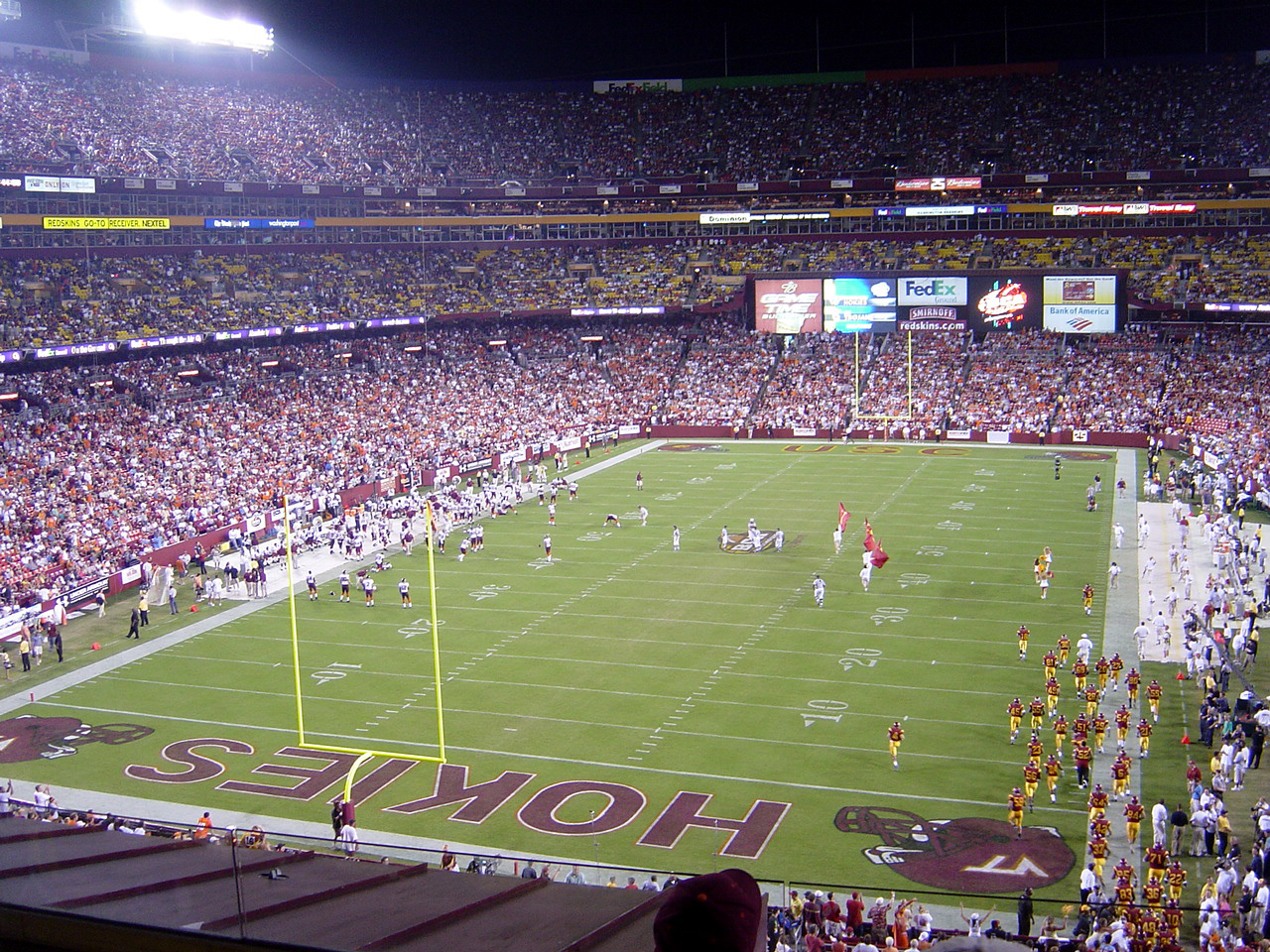
The final 2004 BCA Classic at FedExField

The BCA Classic (1997–2004) was an annual college football game held in the beginning of the season, pitting two major college football programs against each other in order to promote the BCA, generate funds, and, ideally, to feature schools with African American coaches. The 1997 game was titled the Eddie Robinson Classic, while subsequent games were named the BCA Classic.

The BCA sponsored two pre-season games in 2002. The day opened with NC State hosting New Mexico at 4:30 PM (ET), and was followed by a 7:30 PM (ET) kickoff featuring Arizona State at Nebraska.

While the games were successful in terms of attendance and media coverage, the number of minority head coaches in D-IA did not go up and the BCA decided against holding a 2005 BCA Classic after its initial television contract expired in 2004.

Season	Date	Winning Team		Losing Team		Site	Attendance
1997	August 28	9 Ohio State	24	Wyoming	10	Ohio Stadium • Columbus, OH	89,112
1998	August 29	15 Colorado State	28	23 Michigan State	16	Spartan Stadium • East Lansing, MI	68,624
1999	August 28	NC State	23	17 Texas	20	Darrell K Royal–Texas Memorial Stadium • Austin, TX	82,582
2000	August 27^{†}	Georgia Tech	–	11 Virginia Tech	–	Lane Stadium • Blacksburg, VA	56,431
2001	August 25	BYU	70	Tulane	35	LaVell Edwards Stadium • Provo, UT	49,008
2002	August 24	NC State	34	New Mexico	14	Carter–Finley Stadium • Raleigh, NC	82,582
2002	August 24	10 Nebraska	48	Arizona State	10	Memorial Stadium • Lincoln, NE	77,779
2003	August 23	7 Kansas State	42	California	28	Arrowhead Stadium • Kansas City, MO	50,823
2004	August 28	1 USC	24	Virginia Tech	13	FedExField • Landover, MD	91,665
Rankings from AP Poll prior to game.

†The 2000 game was postponed when a lightning storm developed over Lane Stadium (notably hitting ESPN broadcaster Lee Corso's rental car), the game was never rescheduled
