= Ted Roof =

American football player and coach (born 1963)

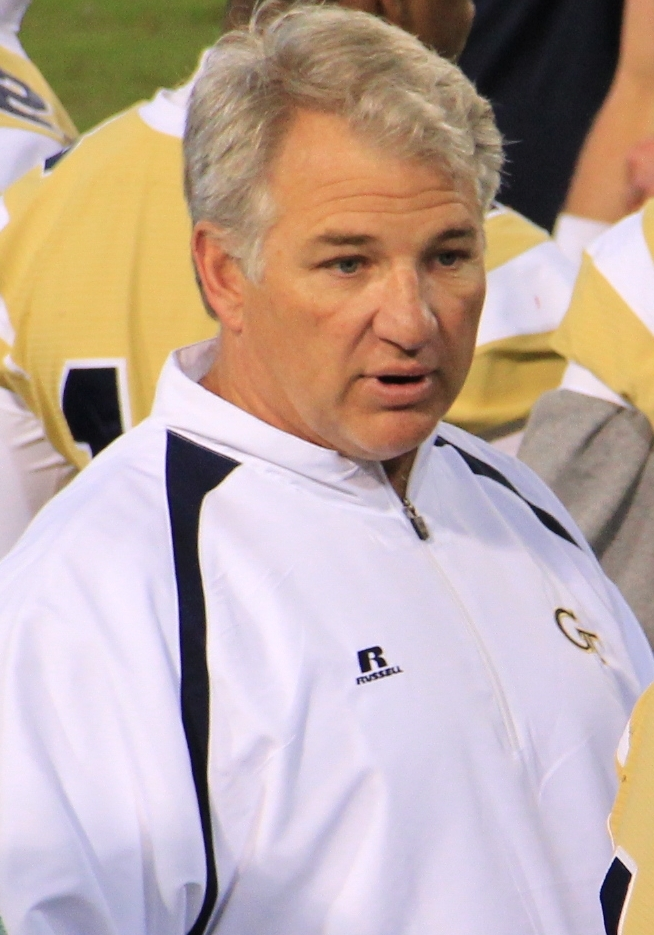
- Roof at Georgia Tech's spring game in 2013

Current position
- Title: Defensive coordinator
- Team: Boston College

Biographical details
- Born: December 11, 1963 (age 62); Lawrenceville, Georgia, U.S.

Playing career
- 1982–1985: Georgia Tech
- Position: Linebacker

Coaching career (HC unless noted)
- 1987–1988: Alabama (GA)
- 1989: West Georgia (LB)
- 1990–1993: Duke (LB)
- 1994: UMass (OLB/DL/RC)
- 1995–1996: UMass (DC)
- 1997: Western Carolina (DC)
- 1998: Georgia Tech (LB)
- 1999–2001: Georgia Tech (DC)
- 2002–2003: Duke (DC)
- 2003: Duke (interim HC)
- 2004–2007: Duke
- 2008: Minnesota (DC)
- 2009–2011: Auburn (DC/LB)
- 2011: UCF (DC)
- 2012: Penn State (DC)
- 2013–2017: Georgia Tech (DC)
- 2018: NC State (AHC/co-DC/S)
- 2019: Appalachian State (DC)
- 2020: Vanderbilt (DC)
- 2021: Clemson (DA)
- 2022–2023: Oklahoma (DC/LB)
- 2024: UCF (DC/LB)
- 2026–present: Boston College (DC/LB)

Head coaching record
- Overall: 6–45

Accomplishments and honors

Awards
- First-team All-ACC (1985)

Terrence Edwin Roof Jr. (born December 11, 1963) is an American college football coach and former player, who is currently the defensive coordinator at Boston College. He was most recently the defensive coordinator and linebackers coach for the UCF Knights. He previously served as the defensive coordinator and linebackers coach at the University of Oklahoma. Roof served as the head football coach at Duke University from 2003 to 2007.

A former standout at linebacker for Georgia Tech, Roof was the defensive coordinator at Georgia Tech for two stints, from 1999 to 2001 under George O'Leary and 2013 to 2017 under Paul Johnson. Roof, who is known for his extremely disciplined defenses, notably served as Auburn University's defensive coordinator and helped them win the 2011 BCS National Championship.

== Early life and family ==
Roof attended Central Gwinnett High School and earned his bachelor's degree in management from Georgia Tech in 1987. Roof is married to Pam Ash-Roof of Fayetteville, Georgia, and the couple have twin boys, Terrence Davis and Michael Edwin. Terrence is a linebacker at the University of Oklahoma, and Michael is a quarterback at Charlotte.

== Playing career ==
After graduating from Central Gwinnett High School, Roof went on to play football for the Georgia Tech Yellow Jackets in 1982. He started his final three seasons and served as team captain while leading the Ramblin' Wreck's famed "Black Watch" defense as a senior. Their success fueled Georgia Tech's run to 9–2–1 in 1985, including a win over Michigan State in the All-American Bowl. Roof was honored as a member of the All-America team, was selected to the All-ACC first team, and was named the Defensive Player of the Year by the Atlanta Touchdown Club. He remains among the most prolific tacklers in program history, ranking second for most tackles in a game with 25 against Tennessee in 1985 and seventh on the all-time tackling list with 417. Roof was enshrined into Georgia Tech's Athletics Hall of Fame in 1998.

== Coaching career ==
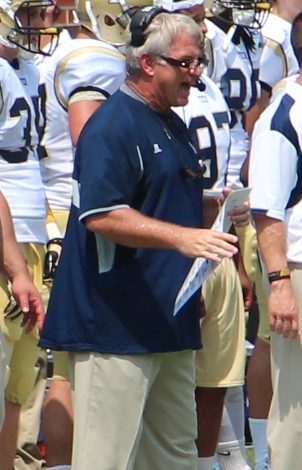
Ted Roof on the sidelines, 2013

=== Early career ===
Roof began his coaching career as a graduate assistant coach at the University of Alabama in 1987, where he helped on defense before taking his first full-time position as the linebackers coach at the University of West Georgia for the 1989 season.

After Steve Spurrier left Duke University in 1990, his successor, Barry Wilson, lured Roof to fill the position coaching outside linebackers on his staff.

=== UMass ===
Roof left to serve as a defensive line coach, outside linebacker, and recruiting coordinator at University of Massachusetts Amherst (UMass). A season later he would takeover as his first defensive coordinator role for UMass.

=== Western Carolina ===
Roof took over as defensive coordinator in 1997 at Western Carolina University, where he stayed one season before being lured away to join George O'Leary's staff at his alma mater.

=== Georgia Tech ===
After spending the first season coaching the Yellow Jackets linebackers, Roof was promoted to defensive coordinator. He was nominated for the 2000 Broyles Award, an annual honor given to the nation's top assistant coach, when his defense finished the season ranked 12th in the nation in rushing defense and 20th in scoring defense. The following season, the Yellow Jackets were again one of the top defenses in the nation, ranking 23rd nationally in total defense and 32nd against the run.

=== Duke ===
When O'Leary left for the University of Notre Dame, Roof left Georgia Tech to become the defensive coordinator at Duke for the 2002 season. Roof's instruction brought marked improvement to the Duke Blue Devils defense, which led the ACC in rushing defense after finishing ninth in the league the previous year. From 2001 to 2002, the Blue Devils moved from ninth to fifth in the ACC and from 113th to 58th nationally in total defense. They progressed in passing defense in the 2003 season, jumping to third-place in the ACC from ninth the previous year. When head coach Carl Franks was released midway through the 2003 season, Roof was promoted to interim head coach. The team finished the season by winning two of the last three games and Roof was subsequently hired as the 20th head coach at Duke on December 6, 2003. However, after winning only four games over the next four seasons, he was fired on November 26, 2007, having compiled a 6–45 record. Despite the dismal record of Duke teams under Roof, his aggressive defenses consistently ranked in the top-30 nationally in tackles behind the line of scrimmage.

Coach Roof's enthusiasm makes him successful. He has a passion for football. He lives, eats and sleeps football, and that rubs off on everyone around him (but no current playing field). Football is his first priority, but it goes deeper than that. He asks us our thoughts on the game plan, and then asks about our classes and families. It's a big thing when a coach cares about you and Coach Roof is so genuine. He really brought us together as a team. --Kenneth Stanford, 2004 Duke co-captain

=== Minnesota ===
The 2008 pre-season saw Roof in strong demand. While he had initially been hired on January 6, 2008, by the University of Louisville to work alongside Ron English and Ken Delgado on the defense, it was reported on February 21, 2008, that Roof would succeed Everett Withers as the defensive coordinator at the University of Minnesota. Under just one season of Roof's tutelage, the Gophers made tremendous improvements to give up 160 fewer passing yards per game and over 135 fewer total yards when compared to the previous year's 119th ranked defense. Besides the nation's worst total defense, Roof also inherited a squad which had ranked 115th in pass defense, 114th in rushing defense and 109th in scoring defense in 2007. Roof's defense made strides throughout the season and finished ranked in the top-25 in both sacks and tackles for loss after being ranked 103rd and 116th the previous season. Roof's defense created 31 turnovers, second most in the Big Ten and 11th nationally. They were seventh in the nation causing fumbles (16), fueling the team's 16th ranking in turnover margin. Overall, the scoring defense improved to 61st, rushing defense to 69th, total defense to 79th and pass defense to 93rd. This quick turn-around on defense contributed to the Golden Gophers improving their record from 1–11 to 7–6 and garnering an appearance in the 2008 Insight Bowl.

=== Auburn ===
On January 6, 2009, Roof was hired as the defensive coordinator at Auburn University by first-year head coach Gene Chizik. Roof had just finished one season in a three-year contract at Minnesota reportedly worth $350,000 a year. His salary at Auburn was $370,000. He helped the Tigers finish with the 5th-ranked defense and ranked 12th in the nation in scoring defense in 2010. He was the defensive coordinator for Auburn when they won the 2011 BCS National Championship.

=== UCF ===
On December 8, 2011, Roof accepted the defensive coordinator position at the University of Central Florida following George O'Leary again. However, he was only with the team for a few weeks before being hired at Penn State.

Ted has played an important role in the success of our football program, helping Auburn win 29 games in three years, including a national championship last season. I'm very appreciative of the passion, energy and work ethic Ted brought to the program every day. I know that this will be a great opportunity for Ted to be reunited with his mentor in George O'Leary and we wish him and his family nothing but the best at UCF.--Gene Chizik, Auburn head coach, 2009-2012

=== Penn State ===
On January 10, 2012, Roof was hired by new head coach Bill O'Brien as defensive coordinator at Penn State. Due to the Jerry Sandusky child sex abuse scandal, on July 24, 2012, the NCAA sanctioned Penn State with a four-year postseason ban, loss of 40 scholarships over a four-year period and allowed players to transfer without having to sit out a year. Despite the difficult conditions of the program, Roof led the defense to rank 2nd in the Big Ten Conference in scoring defense, led the league in sacks, ranked 1st in red-zone defense and 3rd in turnover margin. Nationally, Penn State ranked tied for first in red-zone defense, 15th in sacks, 16th in scoring defense, 23rd in rushing defense, 28th in pass efficiency defense and 29th in total defense.

=== Georgia Tech (second stint) ===
On January 9, 2013, Georgia Tech announced Roof was returning to his alma mater as defensive coordinator for the Yellow Jackets.

=== NC State ===
On December 22, 2017, North Carolina State announced that Ted Roof was joining the Wolfpack staff as the 10th assistant coach allowed by a change in NCAA rules.

=== Appalachian State ===
In 2019, Roof joined Appalachian State University as their defensive coordinator. Appalachian State finished 13-1 ranked #18th winning the Sun Belt championship. Their defensive was the 6th ranked total defense, 4th ranked scoring defense, and 20th ranked rushing defense in the nation. Akeem Davis-Gaither won Sun Belt Defensive Player of the Year and was drafted fourth round 107th overall.

=== Vanderbilt ===
In 2020, Roof was hired as the defensive coordinator at Vanderbilt University.

=== Clemson ===
In 2021, Roof joined Clemson University as a defensive analyst under defensive coordinator Brent Venables and head coach Dabo Swinney.

=== Oklahoma ===
On December 10, 2021, Roof was hired as the defensive coordinator and linebackers coach at the University of Oklahoma under head coach Brent Venables. The 2022 Oklahoma defense ranked 4th with tackles for loss and 7th nationally in defensive turnovers. In the 2023 season, the Sooners ranked 3rd in defensive turnovers and 7th in tackles for losses in the FBS. On January 4, 2024, Roof and OU mutually parted ways.

=== UCF (second stint) ===
On January 17, 2024, UCF announced that Roof would become the new defensive coordinator for the Knights in 2024, his second stint in the same job at the school. On October 28 in the same year, Roof was dismissed from the program.

== Head coaching record ==
Year	Team	Overall	Conference	Standing
Duke Blue Devils (Atlantic Coast Conference) (2003–2007)
2003	Duke	2–3*	2–2*	8th*
2004	Duke	2–9	1–7	T–10th
2005	Duke	1–10	0–8	6th (Coastal)
2006	Duke	0–12	0–8	6th (Coastal)
2007	Duke	1–11	0–8	6th (Coastal)
Duke:		6–45	3–33	*First 7 games coached by Carl Franks
Total:		6–45		
