= Clemson–Florida State football rivalry =

American college football rivalry

- Clemson Tigers Florida State Seminoles
- First meeting: November 7, 1970; Florida State, 38–13
- Latest meeting: October 31, 2026; Clemson, 36–24
- Next meeting: 2027 in Clemson
- Stadiums: Memorial Stadium (Clemson); Doak Campbell Stadium (Florida State)

Statistics
- Total meetings: 39
- All-time series: Florida State leads, 21–18
- Largest victory: Clemson: 59–10 (2018); Florida State: 57–0 (1993)
- Longest win streak: Florida State, 11 (1992–2002)
- Current win streak: Clemson, 3 (2024–present)

Locations of Clemson and Florida State

The Clemson–Florida State football rivalry is an American college football rivalry between the Clemson Tigers football team of Clemson University and Florida State Seminoles football team of Florida State University. The schools have played each other annually since 1992. Both universities are members of the Atlantic Coast Conference (ACC), and during the era of ACC divisional play between 2005 and 2022, both teams competed in the ACC's Atlantic Division. For several years in the late 1990s and early 2000s, the matchup was known alternatively as the Bowden Bowl for the father, former head coach Bobby Bowden of the Seminoles, and the son, Tommy Bowden, formerly head coach of the Tigers.

Similar to a period in the late 1980s, the now annual football game has recently seen a resurgence with national implications as both programs have returned to the national spotlight. Since Clemson's current head coach Dabo Swinney arrived on campus in 2003 as an assistant, the Tigers have won 16 of the last 23 games in this series. In 2016, CBS Sports named the Clemson–Florida State matchup as "the best annual game in college football", stating "Clemson–Florida State has supplanted Alabama–LSU as the one annual game you can bank on needing to watch to figure out the postseason." Both programs have accounted for over 30 ACC titles, and have represented the conference consistently in the post season since 2011.

== Series history ==
Clemson and FSU first played in 1970, predating Florida State's membership in the ACC. The actual rivalry started to emerge in 1988 when the No. 3 Clemson Tigers hosted the No. 10 Seminoles in a "clash of styles" marked by FSU's highly touted skill talent and passing attack, versus Clemson's well regarded option, linemen and linebackers, that was ultimately decided by Leroy Butler's 78-yard "puntrooskie" run, costing Clemson the victory and dashing their national title hopes. Clemson avenged the loss in 1989, dominating the trenches, with a 34–23 victory in Tallahassee, marked by a 73-yard scoring run by Terry Allen and a 73-yard interception return by Wayne Simmons. The Seminoles and Tigers finished the 1989 season with 10–2 records, and ranked No. 3 and No. 12 in the final AP poll, respectively. The series also marked the only two games coached by Danny Ford and Bobby Bowden, who were the 3rd and 9th ranked coaches in winning percentage in college football at the time.

Unfortunately for alumni, sports writers, and football fans, the 1988 and 1989 series would be but a brief glimpse of a potential rivalry between two growing, nationally recognized programs, with divergent styles, that would not begin to be realized again for over another decade. Prior to FSU's arrival, Clemson was a dominant team in the ACC winning 6 of 10 ACC titles from 1981 to 1991. However, after the departure of Clemson's national championship winning coach Danny Ford in 1989, Clemson's program went into decline for a decade, as Florida State's success continued for much of the 1990s. The potential rivalry began to pick up again, when Tommy Bowden, son of FSU coach Bobby Bowden was hired at Clemson University in 1999, in an attempt to secure facility upgrades, and help rebuild the program.

=== Bowden Bowl: Tommy vs. Bobby ===
When Tommy Bowden was named head coach of Clemson on December 2, 1998, the opportunity arose for the first ever meeting between a father and his son as opposing head coaches on the football field. The series became known as the "Bowden Bowl" (1999–2007). Florida State and Clemson have faced each other on a yearly basis since Florida State joined the Atlantic Coast Conference in 1992. In 2005, when the ACC expanded to twelve teams, Clemson and Florida State were placed together in the Atlantic Division; this allowed the teams to continue to face each other without interruption. The first meeting in 1999 was the largest crowd ever to watch a game at Memorial Stadium at Clemson University with an attendance of 86,200 which Florida State won 17–14 on their way to a perfect, wire-to-wire national championship. Bobby won the all-time series, with five wins and four losses. Tommy Bowden's first win came in 2003 on his father's birthday, defeating then third-ranked FSU, damaging their prospects for a national championship. During the Bowden Bowl era, FSU won five conference championships. Tommy Bowden's Tigers beat two of those ACC champions: in 2003 and 2005. The Bowden vs. Bowden editions of the series ended when Tommy resigned as head coach six games into the 2008 football season.

=== Dabo & Fisher ===
The rivalry lives on past the departure of Tommy Bowden, who was replaced mid-season by his wide receivers coach, Dabo Swinney, in 2008. The games in 2008 and 2009 both came down to the 4th quarter with the home teams winning respectively, and influencing the Atlantic Division standings. During the 2009 season, Clemson went on to clinch the Atlantic Division after a 40–24 win in Death Valley, while similarly, Florida State won the division after a 16–13 down to the wire decision the following year in Tallahassee despite being without starting quarterback Christian Ponder. At the end of the 2009 season Bobby Bowden retired from Florida State University leaving his Offensive Coordinator and Head Coach in Waiting Jimbo Fisher as head coach of the team. In 2011, Clemson brought the ACC Championship back to the Atlantic Division with a win over Virginia Tech in the ACC Championship Game.

In the decade prior, the series was evenly split, with each team winning 5 games. Both teams in 2012 were ranked in the Top 10 for the first time since 2000, where an early 14-point Clemson lead thanks to trick plays ended, in a game that was also decided in the 4th quarter with FSU winning 49–37. In a primetime marquee top 5 matchup in 2013, after 4 Clemson turnovers in the first half, including a fumble returned by Mario Edwards, FSU pulled away and went on to win decisively 51–14 in Death Valley, scoring the most points ever by an opponent, while also notching their first victory in Death Valley since 2001. The Tigers failed to break a noise record they set out to break during that game. Their 2013 meeting marked the first time both teams were ranked simultaneously in the Top 5. FSU went on to have a perfect season winning the BCS National Championship over Auburn, while Clemson finished with an 11 win season and a victory over Ohio State in the 2014 Orange Bowl. The 2014 matchup was also a Top 25 classic as No. 22 Clemson controlled the line of scrimmage by holding No. 1 Florida State to 13 yards rushing in regulation, but came up short with critical red zone errors in a 23–17 overtime loss. The Seminoles rallied behind Sean Maguire, and were without Heisman winning quarterback Jameis Winston, who was suspended for the game for yelling an obscene expression on campus a few days before the game.

In 2015 in yet another marquee matchup, after giving up a 75-yard touchdown to Dalvin Cook on the game's second snap, Clemson's defense showed toughness, allowing just two field goals the rest of the way thanks in part to two FSU turnovers, as the Tigers stopped Cook on third and fourth down runs in the fourth quarter with the Seminoles a yard from a first down. Clemson's Heisman finalist quarterback Deshaun Watson threw a go-ahead TD to Deon Cain, and Wayne Gallman came through with a game-sealing scoring as No. 1 Clemson held off No. 17 Florida State, opening a path for the Tigers to the ACC Championship, College Football Playoff, and the 2016 National Championship Game.

In 2016, undefeated #3 Clemson traveled to Tallahassee to play the #12 Seminoles. Although the Tigers jumped out to a 14–0 lead in the first quarter, Florida State rallied back strong in the second half. Dalvin Cook exploded for 169 yards and 4 touchdowns, almost all in the second half of the game, to pull the Seminoles ahead 34–29 with less than four minutes to play in a game that saw four total lead changes. Deshaun Watson, who threw for 378 yards and two touchdowns, led Clemson down the field and pulled the Tigers ahead with a 34-yard touchdown strike to tight end Jordan Leggett. The two-point conversion put Clemson ahead, 37–34. FSU came within field goal range to tie the game, but two sacks by the Clemson defense on quarterback Deondre Francois sealed the victory for the Tigers.

=== Clemson's Dominance and Florida State's Comeback ===
Coming into the 2017 NCAA Division I FBS football season, Florida State was highly ranked and favored to win the ACC Championship after Clemson lost major talent due to graduation and the NFL draft from the previous season. Ranked #3 going into their season opening matchup against top-ranked Alabama in Atlanta at the newly opened Mercedes-Benz Stadium for the Chick-fil-A Kickoff Game, Florida State came into the season with high expectations. However, Deondre Francois suffered a season-ending patellar tendon injury, which derailed the Seminoles' entire program. Florida State began the season 3–5 heading into the Clemson game, which Clemson would ride to a dominant 31–14 victory at Memorial Stadium (Clemson). This chain of events would eventually lead to FSU head coach Jimbo Fisher moving on to take the vacant position at Texas A&M. Florida State would eventually hire Willie Taggart, whose success against the Tigers would continue to wane. The 2018 matchup between the two teams ended up being one of the most one-sided affairs in the rivalry's history. Clemson entered the contest undefeated riding the play of freshman quarterback sensation Trevor Lawrence. Clemson would hand Florida State one of their worst losses in program history, having set the record for highest loss margin in Doak-Campbell Stadium history, and tie the largest deficit in FSU program history as well with the 59–10 victory in Tallahassee. Clemson would go on to win another Championship, defeating Alabama in the 2019 College Football Playoff National Championship. Having professed that players "gave up" during that game, Coach Willie Taggart vowed such a loss would never happen again. However, Taggart's struggles continued into the 2019 season. Entering the Clemson game with a 2–2 record, Clemson again defeated Florida State by 30+ pts at Memorial Stadium, by a score of 45–14. This extended the Tigers' win streak in the series to 5, their longest to date. From 2017 to 2019, Florida State would be outscored by Clemson by a 105–38 margin. Clemson would also be the first team in Atlantic Coast Conference history to win 5 straight ACC Championship Games whereas Florida State would end up firing Willie Taggart and finishing with their second consecutive losing season. Heading into 2020, Florida State hired former Memphis head coach Mike Norvell, their third head coach in 4 seasons. The 2021 and 2022 contests were closer but Clemson still won 30–20 and 34–28 respectively. In 2023, Florida State finally broke the seven game skid after they won 31–24 in overtime. A year later, Clemson got revenge against a struggling Florida State squad by winning 29–13.

== Conference championships ==
Clemson and Florida State have combined to win 35 ACC titles through the 2020 season, with Clemson achieving 20 and Florida State having 15. Clemson's 8th ACC championship came in 1981 with a perfect season and a consensus national title, while going on to win six ACC titles in a decade. After the departure of their national title winning coaching staff in 1989, Clemson's program went into a slight decline, as Florida State entered the conference and quickly rose to the top, winning nine straight conference titles (although 2 of them were not outright). Florida State would remain dominant in the ACC until the mid-2010s, where Clemson would emerge once more. In 2017, the Tigers won their 17th ACC title with a 12–1 regular season and a 38–3 win over Miami in the ACC Championship Game. In 2018, the Tigers would then win their 4th straight ACC championship against Pitt 42–10, becoming the first team in ACC history to win the conference four times in a row outright. The Tigers would then go on to become the first 15–0 team in the modern era. The Tigers would win their 6th championship in a row in 2020 with a 34–10 win over Notre Dame. From 2009 to 2019, the winner of the Clemson–Florida State game would represent the Atlantic Division in the ACC Championship Game. Clemson won the game in 2020 and went to the ACC Championship Game, but the conference competed without divisions due to changes made because of the COVID-19 pandemic.

== Game results ==
Clemson victories	Florida State victories

No.	Date	Location	Winning team		Losing team	
1	November 7, 1970	Tallahassee, FL	Florida State	38	Clemson	13
2	November 1, 1975	Clemson, SC	Florida State	43	Clemson	7
3	October 30, 1976	Tallahassee, FL	Clemson	15	Florida State	12
4	September 17, 1988	Clemson, SC	#10 Florida State	24	#3 Clemson	21
5	September 9, 1989	Tallahassee, FL	#10 Clemson	34	#16 Florida State	23
6	September 12, 1992	Clemson, SC	#5 Florida State	24	#15 Clemson	20
7	September 11, 1993	Tallahassee, FL	#1 Florida State	57	#22 Clemson	0
8	October 22, 1994	Tallahassee, FL	#7 Florida State	17	Clemson	0
9	September 9, 1995	Clemson, SC	#1 Florida State	45	Clemson	26
10	October 5, 1996	Tallahassee, FL	#2 Florida State	34	Clemson	3
11	September 20, 1997	Clemson, SC	#5 Florida State	35	#16 Clemson	28
12	October 17, 1998	Tallahassee, FL	#6 Florida State	48	Clemson	0
13	October 23, 1999	Clemson, SC	#1 Florida State	17	Clemson	14
14	November 4, 2000	Tallahassee, FL	#4 Florida State	54	#16 Clemson	7
15	November 3, 2001	Clemson, SC	#14 Florida State	41	Clemson	27
16	October 3, 2002	Tallahassee, FL	#11 Florida State	48	Clemson	31
17	November 8, 2003	Clemson, SC	Clemson	26	#3 Florida State	10
18	September 25, 2004	Tallahassee, FL	#8 Florida State	41	Clemson	22
19	November 12, 2005	Clemson, SC	Clemson	35	#17 Florida State	14
20	September 16, 2006	Tallahassee, FL	Clemson	27	#10 Florida State	20

No.	Date	Location	Winning team		Losing team	
21	September 3, 2007	Clemson, SC	Clemson	24	Florida State	18
22	November 8, 2008	Tallahassee, FL	#24 Florida State	41	Clemson	27
23	November 7, 2009	Clemson, SC	Clemson	40	Florida State	24
24	November 13, 2010	Tallahassee, FL	Florida State	16	Clemson	13
25	September 24, 2011	Clemson, SC	#21 Clemson	35	#11 Florida State	30
26	September 22, 2012	Tallahassee, FL	#4 Florida State	49	#10 Clemson	37
27	October 19, 2013	Clemson, SC	#5 Florida State	51	#3 Clemson	14
28	September 20, 2014	Tallahassee, FL	#1 Florida State	23	#22 Clemson	17^{OT}
29	November 7, 2015	Clemson, SC	#3 Clemson	23	#17 Florida State	13
30	October 29, 2016	Tallahassee, FL	#3 Clemson	37	#12 Florida State	34
31	November 11, 2017	Clemson, SC	#4 Clemson	31	Florida State	14
32	October 27, 2018	Tallahassee, FL	#2 Clemson	59	Florida State	10
33	October 12, 2019	Clemson, SC	#2 Clemson	45	Florida State	14
34	October 30, 2021	Clemson, SC	#14 Clemson	30	Florida State	20
35	October 15, 2022	Tallahassee, FL	#4 Clemson	34	Florida State	28
36	September 23, 2023	Clemson, SC	#4 Florida State	31	Clemson	24^{OT}
37	October 5, 2024	Tallahassee, FL	#15 Clemson	29	Florida State	13
38	November 8, 2025	Clemson, SC	Clemson	24	Florida State	10
39	October 31, 2026	Tallahassee, FL	Clemson	36	Florida State	24
Series: Florida State leads 21–18

== See also ==
- List of NCAA college football rivalry games
