= Troy Andrew =

American football player (born 1979)

No. 65
- Position: Center

Personal information
- Born: December 12, 1977 (age 48); Tamuning, Guam
- Listed height: 6 ft 4 in (1.93 m)
- Listed weight: 305 lb (138 kg)

Career information
- High school: Klein (TX)
- College: Duke
- NFL draft: 2001: undrafted

Career history
- Miami Dolphins (2001–2002); Houston Texans (2002); Miami Dolphins (2002); Barcelona Dragons (2003); Cleveland Browns (2003)*; Berlin Thunder (2004); San Diego Chargers (2004)*
- * Offseason or practice squad member only

Awards and highlights
- World Bowl XII champion

Career NFL statistics
- Games played: 8
- Stats at Pro Football Reference

Troy Warden Andrew (born December 12, 1977) is a former American football center who played one season in the National Football League (NFL) for the Miami Dolphins in 2001. He played college football at Duke.

== Early life ==
Troy Andrew was born in Tamuning, Guam on December 12, 1979. He went to high school at Klein (TX).

== College ==
He went to college at Duke.

== Professional career ==
Miami Dolphins

Andrew was signed as a undrafted free agent by the Miami Dolphins on April 26, 2001. He played 8 games that season. He wore number 65 for the Dolphins. He was released on September 9, 2002.

Houston Texans

The next day after being cut he was claimed off waivers by the Houston Texans. But he did not make the roster and was cut 4 days later. He did not play in any games for the Texans.

Miami Dolphins (Second Stint)

Troy was then signed to the Miami Dolphins practice squad three days after being cut by the Texans. He was on the practice squad all year and did not play in any games. In the offseason he played for the Barcelona Dragons. In 2002 he was cut before the season started.

Barcelona Dragons

During the offseason of 2002, he was the starting center the full season for the Barcelona Dragons. He played all ten games and started them.

Cleveland Browns

On November 26, 2003, he was signed to the Cleveland Browns practice squad. He did not play in any games for the Browns. On January 5, 2004, he was released.

Berlin Thunder

During the 2004 offseason, he was the starting center for the Berlin Thunder. He played in all the games as the Berlin Thunder won World Bowl XII against the Frankfurt Galaxy.

San Diego Chargers

On June 18, 2004, he was signed by the San Diego Chargers. However, he did not make the roster and was cut on August 31. In his career he played in 8 games, all in 2001. He was not signed and did not play for any other teams after he was released by the Chargers.
