= Ole Miss Rebels football =

Football team of the University of Mississippi

2026 Ole Miss Rebels football team
- First season: 1893; 133 years ago
- Athletic director: Keith Carter
- General manager: Austin Thomas
- Head coach: Pete Golding; 1st season, 8–5 (.615)
- Location: University, Mississippi
- Stadium: Vaught–Hemingway Stadium (capacity: 64,038)
- Field: Jerry Hollingsworth Field
- NCAA division: Division I FBS
- Conference: SEC
- Colors: Cardinal red and navy blue
- All-time record: 707–538–34 (.566)
- CFP record: 2–1 (.667)
- Bowl record: 26–15 (.634)

National championships
- Claimed: 1959, 1960, 1962

College Football Playoff appearances
- 2025

Conference championships
- SEC: 1947, 1954, 1955, 1960, 1962, 1963

Division championships
- SEC West: 2003
- Consensus All-Americans: 14
- Rivalries: Mississippi State (rivalry); LSU (rivalry); Vanderbilt (rivalry); Alabama (rivalry); Arkansas (rivalry); Memphis (rivalry); Tulane (rivalry)); Auburn (rivalry)

Uniforms
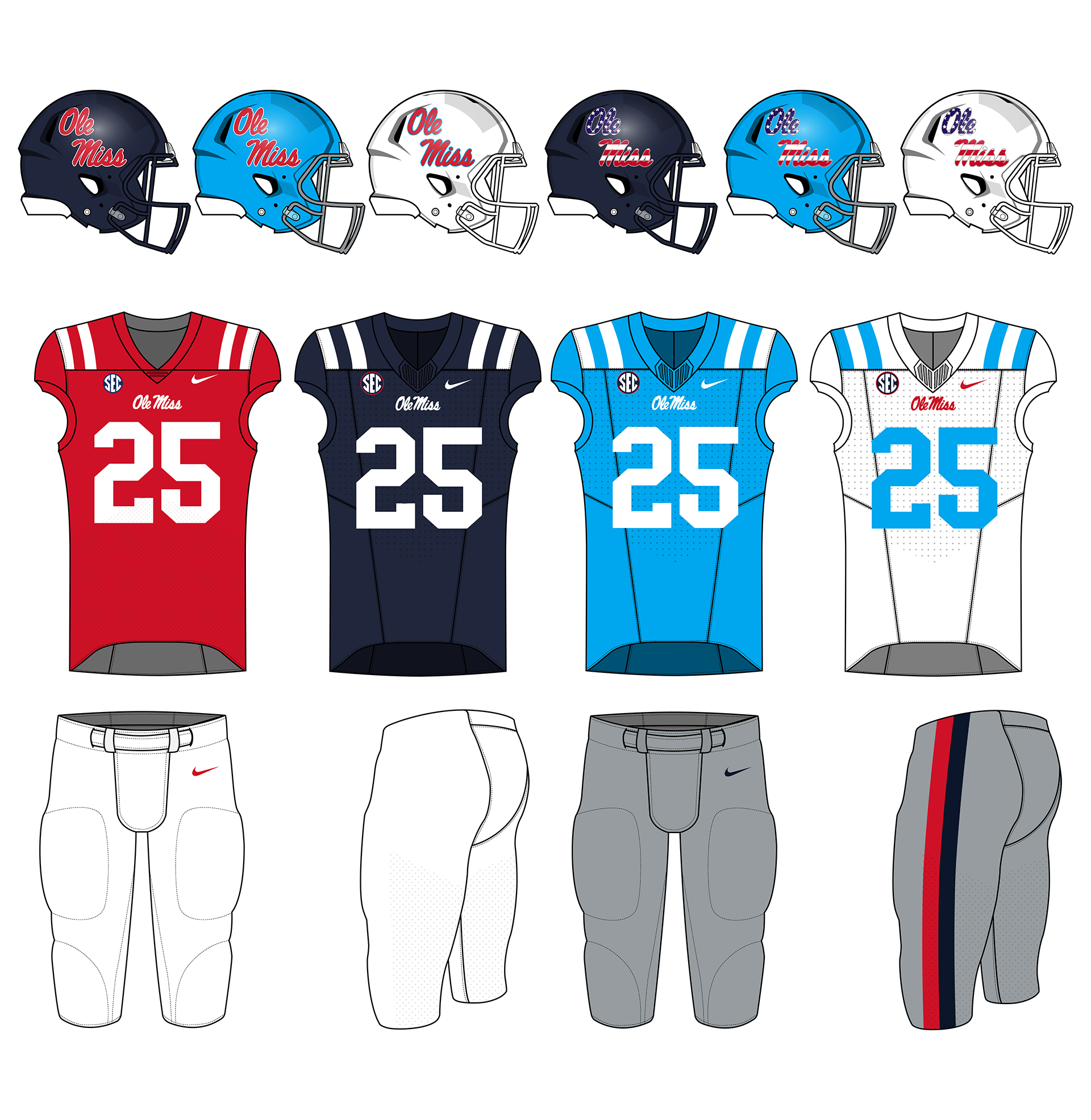
- Fight song: Forward Rebels
- Mascot: Colonel Reb
- Marching band: Pride of the South
- Outfitter: Nike
- Website: olemisssports.com/football

The Ole Miss Rebels football program represents the University of Mississippi, also known as "Ole Miss". The Rebels compete in the Football Bowl Subdivision (FBS) of the National Collegiate Athletic Association (NCAA) as members of the Southeastern Conference (SEC). The Rebels play their home games at Vaught–Hemingway Stadium on the university's campus in University, Mississippi.

Founded in 1893, Ole Miss has won 6 Southeastern Conference titles, in 1947, 1954, 1955, 1960, 1962, 1963. Ole Miss has been recognized as a national champion three times by NCAA-designated major selectors in 1959, 1960, and 1962, and the university claims all three championships. With a record of 28–16, Ole Miss has the second-highest postseason winning percentage of schools with 30 or more bowl appearances.

Pete Golding, the program's head coach, succeeded Lane Kiffin in November 2025.

== History ==
The Ole Miss football team played its first season in 1893 and have since fielded a team every year except for 1897 (due to a yellow fever epidemic) and 1943 (due to World War II). In that first season, the team compiled a 4–1 record under head coach Alexander Bondurant. In 1899, Ole Miss became a member of the Southern Intercollegiate Athletic Association (SIAA). The program joined the Southern Conference in 1922 and the Southeastern Conference in 1933.

=== Johnny Vaught era (1947–1970, 1973) ===
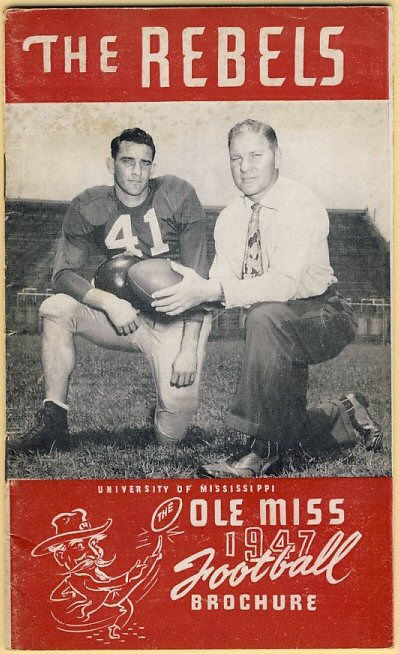
1947 Ole Miss media guide featuring Charlie Conerly (left) and coach Johnny Vaught (right)

The modern era of Ole Miss football began in 1947, when Harold Drew was ousted in favor of his line coach, Johnny Vaught. A former All-American at Texas Christian University (TCU), Vaught led the Ole Miss program to national prominence over the next 24 years, posting 23 winning records and making the team a fixture in the national polls.

Just 2–7 in 1946, the Rebels went 9–2 in Vaught's first season at the helm, winning the first of his six SEC titles (1947, 1954, 1955, 1960, 1962, 1963). To date, Vaught is the only coach in Ole Miss history to win an SEC football championship. He also dominated the Egg Bowl rivalry with Mississippi State, going 19–2–4 against the Bulldogs. The 1947 season also saw Ole Miss great Charlie Conerly become the first Rebel player to seriously contend for the Heisman Trophy, placing fourth in the voting.

The Rebels were among the winningest programs in the country during the 1950s. From 1950 to 1959, Ole Miss posted an 80–21–5 record (.778 winning percentage), third only to Oklahoma and Miami (OH) during that decade. Vaught's 1959 squad was honored as the "SEC Team of the Decade."

In the 1960s, Vaught guided the Rebels to a 77–25–6 record and a .740 winning percentage, which was the ninth-best during that decade. The Rebels were ranked atop the Associated Press poll for three weeks during the 1960 season and one week during the 1961 campaign. The 1960 unit finished 10–0–1; the only blemish was a 6–6 tie against LSU. Ole Miss was presented with the Grantland Rice Trophy by the Football Writers Association of America after its Sugar Bowl victory, though that did not carry the same weight of the wire service voting (AP and Coaches' Poll) which selected Minnesota as the national champion.

The Rebels' 1962 season is Ole Miss' only undefeated and untied season: 10–0. They capped off the season with a victory in the Sugar Bowl, but finished No. 3 in both major polls. In 1964, Ole Miss was ranked preseason No. 1 in the Associated Press poll, but finished with a dismal 5–5–1 record at season's end.

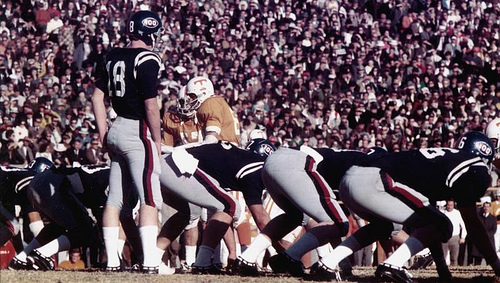
#18 Archie Manning awaiting the snap in a 1969 game against Tennessee

Vaught also made going to postseason play the norm rather than the exception for the Rebel football program. Ole Miss played in 15 consecutive bowl games from 1957 to 1971, a national record at the time. In all, Vaught led Ole Miss to 18 bowl games, posting a 10–8 record. For his efforts, Vaught was named SEC Coach of the Year six times (1947, 1948, 1954, 1955, 1960, 1962).

Vaught coached some of the best players in Ole Miss football history. and produced 26 All-America first-teamers. He also coached four players who finished in the top five in the Heisman Trophy voting: Conerly in 1947, Charlie Flowers (5th in 1959), Jake Gibbs (3rd in 1960), and Archie Manning (4th in 1969, 3rd in 1970).

Failing health forced Vaught to resign his position in 1970. He was succeeded by Billy Kinard.

No Ole Miss coach has since matched Vaught's longevity or winning percentage.

=== Billy R. Kinard era (1971–1973) ===
Billy Kinard, the first Ole Miss alumnus to head up the football program, won 10 games in 1971, fourth-most by a first-year head coach in NCAA Division I history, but was fired after going 5–5 in 1972 and starting the 1973 season 1–2.

Vaught was rehired to finish out the 1973 season, then resigned once again as head coach. As of 2022, his final record of 190–61–12 still ranks him in the top 25 winningest coaches in NCAA Division I history.

Kinard's tenure saw the team's first Black player, 79 years after the team started and a decade after the university admitted its first Black student. Ben Williams, a defensive tackle, recruited out of a small school in the Delta region of Mississippi, eventually claimed All-SEC honors and had a long and successful NFL career following his stint at Ole Miss.

=== Ken Cooper era (1974–1977) ===
Ken Cooper, an assistant under Kinard since 1971, was named head coach on January 17, 1974, and took Ole Miss through the 1977 season. Cooper compiled a 21–23 record, and his tenure is probably best remembered for the September 1977 upset of Notre Dame, who finished the season 11–1 and AP and UPI national champion.

=== Steve Sloan era (1978–1982) ===
Steve Sloan, the former All-American quarterback at Alabama under Paul "Bear" Bryant, posted a 20–34 record from 1978 to 1982.

=== Billy Brewer era (1983–1993) ===
After stepping outside the Ole Miss family football tree the previous nine seasons, former Rebel star player Billy Brewer took over as head coach in December 1982. In his 11 seasons as head coach, Brewer led the Rebels to five winning seasons and four bowls, including Ole Miss' 1990 New Year's Day Gator Bowl appearance, which was the program's first January bowl game since 1969. He was named SEC Coach of the Year in 1986 (8–3–1 record) and 1990 (9–3 record), and in 1986, the Rebels returned to the national rankings for the first time in over a decade. He compiled a 68–55–3 record and led Ole Miss to eight Egg Bowl victories over rival Mississippi State.

Brewer was dismissed just before the 1994 season after the NCAA infractions committee found him guilty of "unethical conduct," Ole Miss defensive coordinator Joe Lee Dunn finished the season as interim coach.

=== Tommy Tuberville era (1995–1998) ===
Hired on December 2, 1994, Tommy Tuberville led the 1995 Rebels to a 6–5 record and an Egg Bowl victory over Mississippi State. In 1997, Ole Miss recorded its best season in five years with an 8–4 record, a 15–14 Egg Bowl victory over Mississippi State and a Motor City Bowl win over Marshall University. The bowl appearance was the program's first since 1992, and the Rebels earned a final national ranking of No. 22 in both polls.

During the 1998 season, Tuberville repeatedly said he would not leave Ole Miss. With a month to go before the team's bowl game, he told alumni, "They'll have to take me out of here in a pine box". Two days later, he accepted the job of head coach at SEC West rival Auburn University.

=== David Cutcliffe era (1998–2004) ===
David Cutcliffe took over as head coach on December 2, 1998, just 29 days before the Rebels met Texas Tech in the Sanford Independence Bowl. They prevailed, 35–18, in arguably the biggest upset of the 1998 bowl season.

Instilling a high-powered offensive style, Cutcliffe had four winning seasons in his first five seasons at Ole Miss, in 1999 (8–4), 2000 (7–5), 2001 (7–4) and 2002 (7–6), becoming the first Rebel mentor since Harry Mehre (1938–41) to post winning marks in his first five years. From 1997 to 2003, the Rebels played in six bowl games, tied with Arkansas for the most bowl appearances among SEC Western Division schools during that span. In 2003, Cutcliffe guided the Rebels to a 10–3 overall mark and a share of the SEC West title with eventual BCS National Champion LSU.

Despite his 44–29 record, five straight winning seasons, and guiding the team to its first 10 win season in over 30 years, Cutcliffe was fired by Ole Miss's Athletic Director Pete Boone in December 2004 after the team posted a disappointing 4–7 record and a third consecutive loss to LSU.

=== Ed Orgeron era (2005–2007) ===
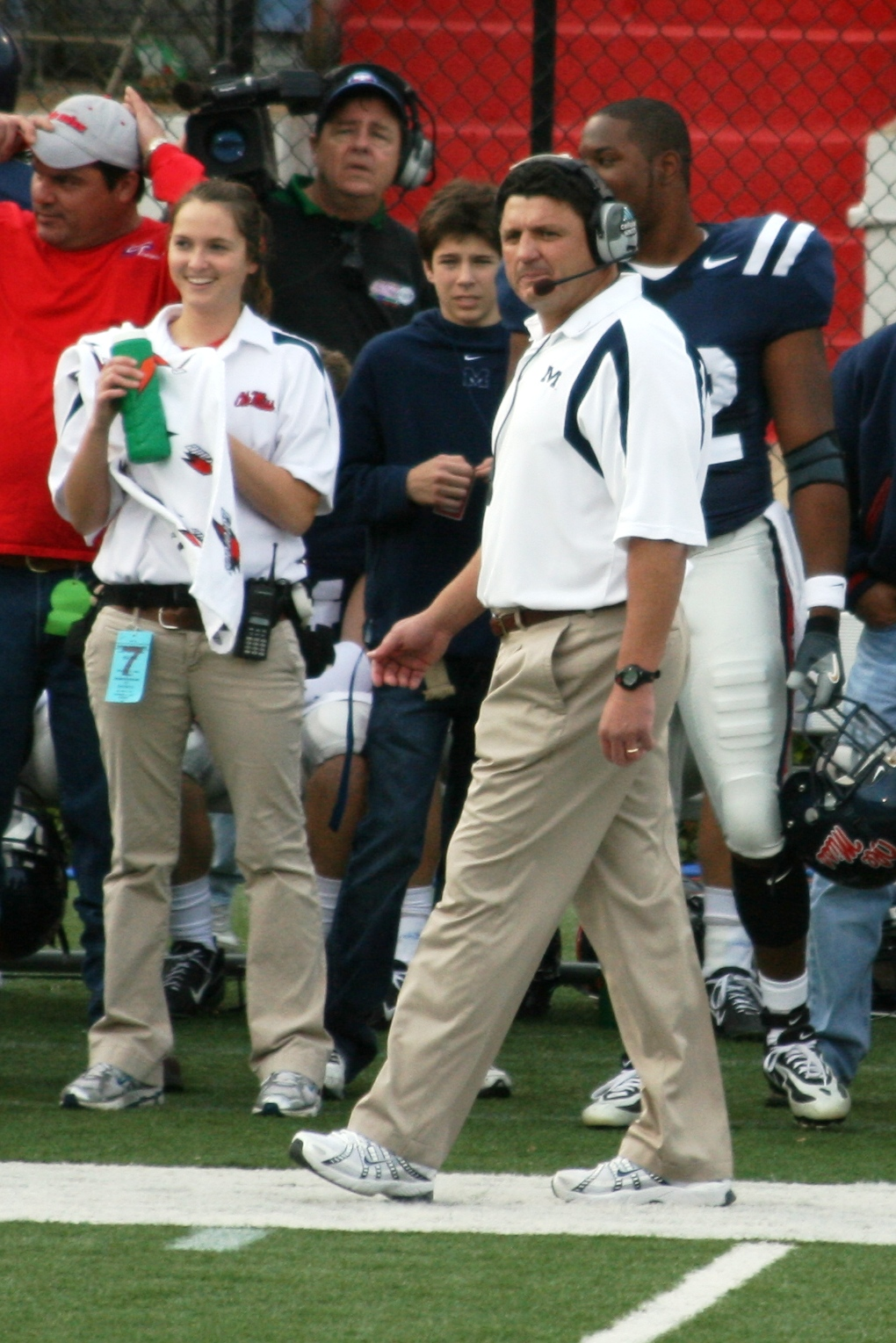
Ed Orgeron

Ed Orgeron took over on December 16, 2004. Named the 2004 National Recruiter of the Year by The Sporting News and Rivals.com, he compiled two of the best-ranking signing classes in 2006 and 2007. This did not lead to on-the-field success. In 2007, Ole Miss was last in the SEC in scoring offense, turnover margin, rushing offense, rushing defense, punt returns, opponent first downs, red-zone offense, opponent third-down conversions, field goal percentage, time of possession and kickoff coverage.

In 2007, the Rebels went winless in the SEC for the first time since 1982 and ended the season at 3–9 (0–8 in SEC play). Orgeron was fired on November 24, 2007, one day after Ole Miss blew a 14-0 fourth quarter lead in the Egg Bowl at Starkville and lost 17-14.

=== Houston Nutt era (2008–2011) ===
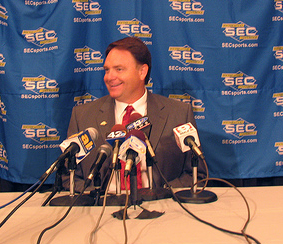
Houston Nutt

Three days later, Houston Nutt was hired as the next head football coach, just five weeks after he had defeated Ole Miss as the head coach of the Arkansas Razorbacks.

In Nutt's first season, he guided the Ole Miss Rebels to a 9–4 record with marquee victories over the eventual BCS National Champion Florida Gators, the reigning BCS National Champion LSU Tigers, and the Texas Tech Red Raiders in the 2009 Cotton Bowl Classic. The Rebels posted their 600th win on September 27, 2008, when they defeated the Gators 31–30. At season's end, the Rebels were ranked in the Top 15 in both major polls.

But in the 2010 and 2011 seasons, the Rebels won a total of six games, and in the latter season, went winless in SEC play. On November 7, 2011, athletic director Pete Boone forced Nutt to resign, effective at the end of the season, citing what ESPN called the program's "total decline".

NCAA investigators later concluded that Nutt had allowed athletes to play while ineligible. In 2019, the NCAA punished Ole Miss for these violations and others committed by his successor, Hugh Freeze, by stripping the team of 33 wins over six seasons. This included all four wins in 2010 and two wins in 2011, making those season the Rebels' first official winless ones in more than a century.

=== Hugh Freeze era (2012–2017) ===
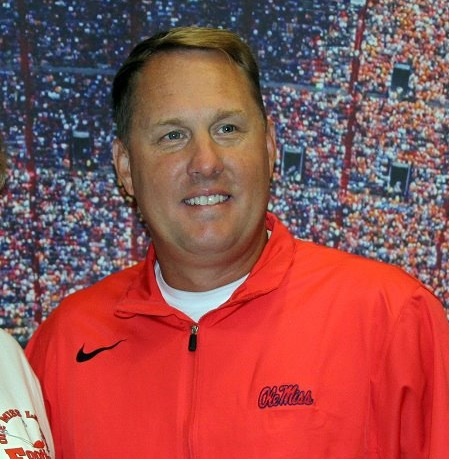
Coach Hugh Freeze

On December 5, 2011, Hugh Freeze became the new head coach. The team went 7–6 with a 38–17 victory over Pitt in the BBVA Compass Bowl.

In Freeze's second year, the Rebels went 8–5 (3–5), defeating then-sixth-ranked LSU on a last-second field goal in Oxford, then beating Georgia Tech, 25–17, in the Music City Bowl.

In 2014, Freeze led Ole Miss to one of its strongest seasons in four decades. The Rebels spent most of the season in the top 10, rising as high as third in October—their highest ranking at that late stage in the season in almost half a century. They ultimately finished 9–3, only the third time since Vaught's tenure that a Rebel team has won as many as nine games. This garnered them a berth in the 2014 Peach Bowl, their first major-bowl appearance since 1969, where the Rebels lost 42–3 to TCU.

In 2015, Freeze led to the Rebels to perhaps the program's strongest season since 1962, when the team went undefeated and untied, with wins over ranked SEC West Rivals LSU and Mississippi State, and was headlined by a road victory over No. 2-ranked Alabama, their first win in Tuscaloosa since 1988 and the first time they had beaten the Tide in back-to-back seasons. The Rebels earned a trip to the 2016 Sugar Bowl, their first appearance in this bowl game since 1970, where they beat Oklahoma State 48–20. Freeze led the Rebels to their first 10-win season since 2003, and only the third since the Vaught era.

The Rebels fared worse in their 2016 campaign, losing the season opener to Florida State 45–34. After a 38–13 Week 2 win over Wofford, Ole Miss went on to lose a close 48–43 game to Alabama, having beat the Crimson Tide only a year before. The rest of the season had mixed results, with the final win being a 29–28 squeaker over Texas A&M. The Rebels wrapped up their 2016 season with a 5-7 record.

On July 20, 2017, Freeze resigned after Ole Miss officials learned that he had used a university-provided cell phone to place calls to an escort service in "a concerning pattern" that began shortly after he took the job in 2011.

NCAA investigators later concluded that Freeze had cheated on 15 occasions by breaking recruiting rules and allowing students to play who had not maintained the required academic standing; they also determined that his predecessor, Nutt, had broken similar rules. University officials quickly attempted to paint Nutt as the main culprit instead of Freeze. Nutt sued for defamation, and the university settled the suit and issued a public apology.

This constituted one of the worst violations ever, and in 2019 the NCAA punished Ole Miss by stripping the team of 33 wins over six seasons, including seven from 2012, eight from 2014, and five from 2016. This changed Freeze's official record at Ole Miss from 39–25 over five seasons to 12–25. The NCAA also banned the team from postseason play for two years, stripped it of scholarships for four years, and placed it on three years of probation.

In 2019, the NCAA vacated 33 of the team's victories dating from 2010 to 2016 and levied a two-year ban on postseason play as punishment for recruiting and academic violations under both Nutt and Freeze.

Meanwhile, the team's star quarterback Shea Patterson and other players told NCAA officials that Freeze had lied to them about the charges while he recruited them. They requested waivers to quickly play for other teams, and were granted them.

=== Matt Luke era (2017–2019) ===
On July 20, 2017, co-offensive coordinator Matt Luke was named interim head coach after Hugh Freeze resigned over calling escorts.

In November 2017, Luke was named the permanent head coach after leading the Rebels to a 6–6 record, including a 31–28 Egg Bowl win over Mississippi State.

Luke guided the team to a 5-7 standing in 2018. Most of the Rebels' wins were notched in the first half of the season. The second half season didn't go as well. Games against stronger opponents resulted in 5 straight losses, making Ole Miss ineligible for any bowl games.

The 2019 season continued where 2018 left off: a losing record and a disappointing 4-8 standing. In the 2019 Egg Bowl, Luke's recruit and future NFL wide receiver Elijah Moore performed a post-touchdown mockery of a urinating dog, costing the Rebels a penalty. The Rebels lost the game by a missed extra point 20–21. Luke was dismissed after the game.

=== Lane Kiffin era (2020–2025) ===
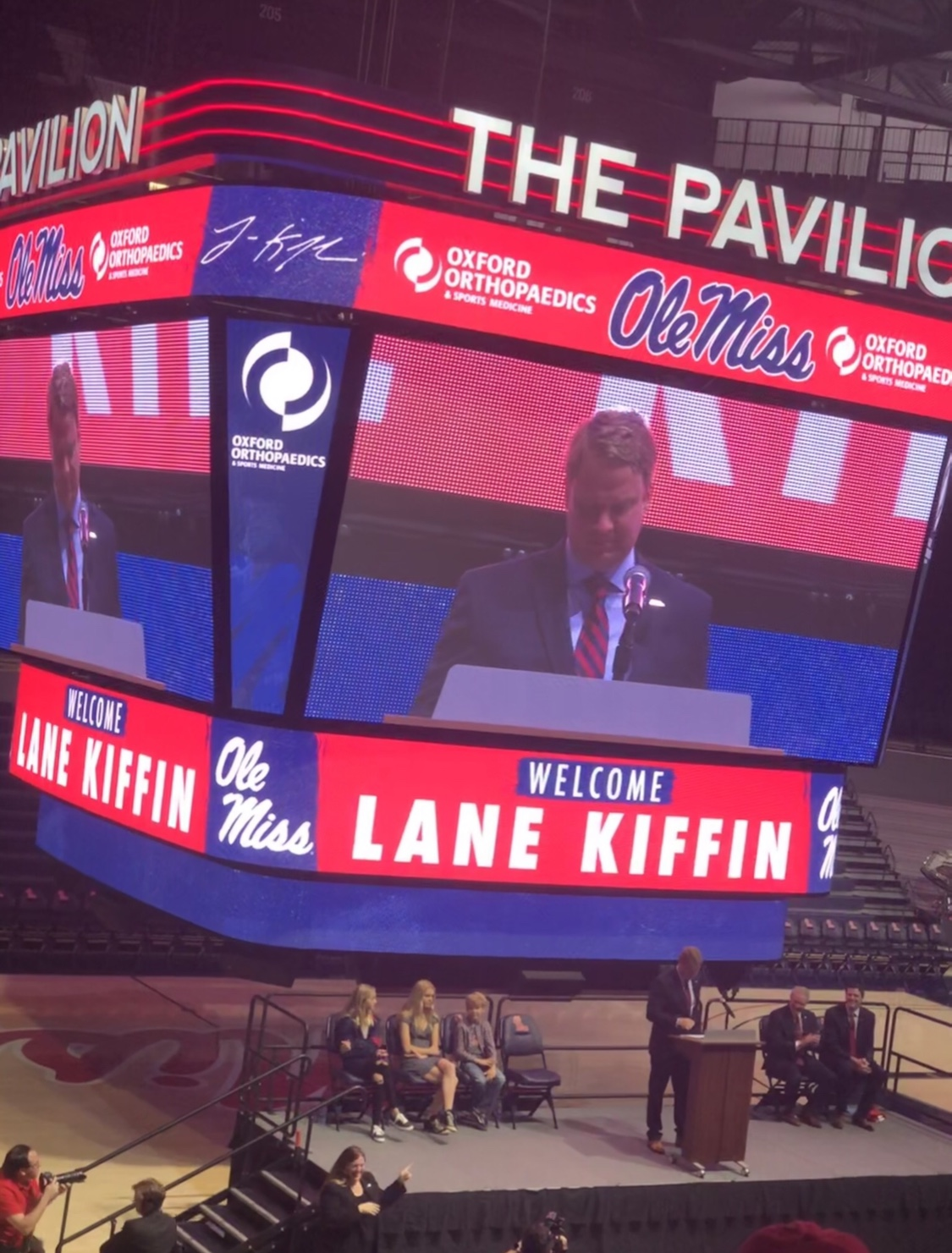
Lane Kiffin's introductory press conference at Ole Miss on December 9, 2019

On December 7, 2019, Ole Miss announced that it had hired Florida Atlantic head coach Lane Kiffin as their next head coach under a four-year, $16.2 million contract. The 44-year old Kiffin arrived in Oxford with a wealth of coaching experience; before serving as the Owls head coach, he served as Alabama's offensive coordinator for three years under Nick Saban, winning one national championship and three SEC championships while helping to coach Heisman Trophy winner Derrick Henry. He had also served as head coach at USC, Tennessee and the NFL's Oakland Raiders.

In his first season at Ole Miss, Kiffin compiled a 5–5 record in an all-SEC Conference schedule, including a 26–20 win over Indiana in the Outback Bowl in Tampa, Florida. On January 2, 2021, Ole Miss signed Kiffin to a contract extension and raise.

In 2021, Kiffin piloted the Rebels to a 10–2 regular-season record, the best in school history, going 6–2 in conference and finishing 11th in both major polls. A 21–7 loss to Baylor in the 2022 Sugar Bowl in New Orleans, Louisiana, left the Rebels with a final record of 10–3, the eighth time the football team has recorded 10 wins in a season. On December 4, 2021, Ole Miss again extended Kiffin's contract and raised his pay.

In 2022, the Rebels compiled an 8–4 record and were ranked No. 20 in the AP poll in week 12. Running back Quinshon Judkins won C Spire Freshman of the Year. On November 29, 2022, amid rumors that Auburn was interested in hiring Kiffin, the Rebels extended his contract and increased his pay for a third time. Auburn ended up hiring former Ole Miss head coach Hugh Freeze instead. Ole Miss finished the 2022 season 8–5, losing five of their last six games, a showing blamed partly on Kiffin being distracted by Auburn's wooing.

In 2023, Ole Miss got off to a 3–0 start, including a 37–20 win at No. 24 Tulane, then lost 24–10 to No. 13 Alabama in Tuscaloosa. The following game against arch-rival LSU drew 66,703 people to Vaught-Hemingway Stadium, setting a new venue record; Ole Miss won, 55–49, getting revenge for LSU's 45–20 blowout the previous year and eliminating them from the College Football Playoff. The next week, they beat Arkansas 27–20, exacting revenge for another 2022 blowout. Kiffin led the team to 8–1 before losing to Georgia 17–52 in Athens. The Rebels finished the season 11–2, including a Peach Bowl win over Penn State 38–25.

The 2024 season proved to be a grueling season for the Ole Miss Rebels. Pre-season hopes were high as the 2024 roster included returning talent, such as future 2025 NFL Draft 1st round pick Jaxson Dart, and future 2025 NFL Draft 2nd round pick Tre Harris, along with promising new talent in players such as future 2025 NFL Draft 1st round pick Walter Nolen.

In 2024, Ole Miss started 4-0, with a 76-0 win over FCS Furman (the highest-scoring shutout of the 2024 season), a 52-3 win over Middle Tennessee, a 40-6 win over Wake Forest and a 52-13 win over Georgia Southern. After peaking at #5 in the AP rankings, the best ranking achieved in decades, they lost at home to Kentucky, which would be the only SEC win for the Wildcats in 2024. They proceeded to beat South Carolina 27-3 in Columbia, but lost to the then #13 LSU Tigers in overtime, 29-26. They then won their next 3 games against Oklahoma, Arkansas, and then #3 ranked Georgia. They lost to the Florida Gators in The Swamp, officially eliminating them from College Football Playoff eligibility, finishing the season with a 9-3 regular season standing and 52-20 Gator Bowl win over Duke.

In 2025, Ole Miss started the season ranked #21 in the AP Poll. They started 4-0 with a 63-7 win over Georgia State and then 2 wins over SEC teams in Kentucky (30-23) and Arkansas (41-35). After that, they stomped Tulane 45-10. In week 5, Ole Miss was ranked 13th as they played #4 LSU where they won 24-19 going into the bye week. Ole Miss was granted their highest AP ranking since 2015 after that at #4. After that, they beat Washington State by 3 before heading to Athens to play #9 Georgia. They went into the 4th quarter up by 9 on Georgia, but ended up losing 43-35 to go to 6-1 on the season. They then finished out the year winning their last 5, starting with a 34-26 road win in the rain at #13 Oklahoma. They came back home for 3 straight games winning all three. They beat South Carolina 30-14, The Citadel 49-0, and Florida 34-24. Ole Miss went into the Egg Bowl with a 10-1 record and beat Mississippi State for a third straight year 38-19. Ole Miss finished the season 11-1, their first 11-win regular season.

As Ole Miss began preparing for the 2025 playoffs, it was reported that Kiffin was expected to leave Ole Miss to become the head coach of LSU. On November 30, 2025, he announced his departure for LSU. In the prepared statement announcing his resignation, he claimed that he had requested to coach Ole Miss through the postseason, a request that was denied by athletic director Keith Carter.

=== Pete Golding era (2025-present) ===
Pete Golding took over as Ole Miss head coach on November 30, 2025. The Rebels qualified for the 2025–26 College Football Playoff as the 6-seed, their first CFP appearance. The team won their first round matchup against 11-seed Tulane, 41–10, followed by a 39–34 win over Georgia in the 2026 Sugar Bowl. On January 8, the Rebels narrowly lost the CFP semifinal against Miami in the 2026 Fiesta Bowl, 31–27.

During the 2026 season, due to the 2026 FAA nationwide ground stop, Ole Miss were unable to complete their originally scheduled flights. Due to reported issues with the team's contracted charter company, they were unable to depart until Saturday afternoon. This resulted in the SEC rescheduling the game against University of Oklahoma for Sunday, November 15th, 2026. Ole Miss was the only SEC team to have their game rescheduled to a different day as a result of their travel being impacted by the ground stop

== Conference affiliations ==
Ole Miss has been a member of the Southeastern Conference since its founding in 1932.

Ole Miss has been affiliated with the following conferences.

- Independent (1893–1904)
- Southern Intercollegiate Athletic Association (1905–1921)
- Southern Conference (1922–1932)
- Southeastern Conference (1932–present)

== Championships ==
=== National championships ===
Ole Miss has been recognized as a national champion three times (1959, 1960, and 1962) by NCAA-designated major selectors.

Season	Coach	Selectors	Record	Bowl	Opponent	Result	Final AP	Final Coaches
1959	Johnny Vaught	Berryman, Dunkel, Sagarin	10–1	Sugar Bowl	LSU	W 21–0	No. 2	No. 2
1960	Johnny Vaught	Billingsley, Football Writers, DeVold, Dunkel, Football Research, NCF, Williamson	10–0–1	Sugar Bowl	Rice	W 14–6	No. 2	No. 3
1962	Johnny Vaught	Billingsley, Litkenhous, Sagarin	10–0	Sugar Bowl	Arkansas	W 17–13	No. 3	No. 3

=== Conference championships ===
Ole Miss has won six SEC championships.

Season	Conference	Coach	Overall record	Conference record
1947	SEC	Johnny Vaught	9–2	6–1
1954	SEC	Johnny Vaught	9–2	5–1
1955	SEC	Johnny Vaught	10–1	5–1
1960	SEC	Johnny Vaught	10–0–1	5–0–1
1962	SEC	Johnny Vaught	10–0	6–0
1963	SEC	Johnny Vaught	7–1–2	5–0–1

=== Divisional championship ===
The SEC was split into two divisions from the 1992 season through the 2023 season, with Ole Miss competing in the SEC West during that time. Ole Miss has won a share of one divisional title, but has yet to make an appearance in the SEC Championship Game.

Season	Division	Opponent	CG Result
2003†	SEC West	N/A lost tie-breaker to LSU	

† Co-champions

== Head coaches ==
Ole Miss has had 40 head coaches in over a century of play.

Coach	Years	Seasons	Record	Pct.
Alexander Bondurant	1893	1	4–1	.800
C. D. Clark	1894	1	4–1	.800
H. L. Fairbanks	1895	1	2–1	.667
John W. Hollister	1896	1	1–2	.333
No team	1897			
T. G. Scarbrough	1898	1	1–1	.500
W. H. Lyon	1899	1	3–4	.429
Z. N. Estes	1900	1	0–3	.000
William Shibley & Daniel S. Martin	1901	1	2–4	.333
Daniel S. Martin	1902	1	4–3	.571
M. S. Harvey	1903–1904	2	6–4–1	.591
No coach	1905			
Thomas S. Hammond	1906	1	4–2	.667
Frank A. Mason	1907	1	0–6	.000
Frank Kyle	1908	1	3–5	.375
Nathan Stauffer	1909–1911	3	18–7–2	.704
Leo DeTray	1912	1	5–3	.625
William L. Driver	1913–1914	2	11–7–2	.600
Fred A. Robins	1915–1916	2	5–12	.294
Dudy Noble	1917–1918	2	2–7–1	.250
R. L. Sullivan	1919–1921	3	11–13	.458
Roland Cowell	1922–1923	2	8–11–1	.425
Chester S. Barnard	1924	1	4–5	.444
Homer Hazel	1925–1929	5	21–22–3	.489
Ed Walker	1930–1937	8	38–38–8	.500
Harry Mehre	1938–1942, 1944–1945	5, 2	39–26–1	.598
No team	1943			
Harold Drew	1946	1	2–7	.222
Johnny Vaught	1947–1970, 1973	24, 1	190–61–12	.745
Billy Kinard	1971–1973	3	16–9	.640
Ken Cooper	1974–1977	4	21–23	.477
Steve Sloan	1978–1982	5	20–34–1	.373
Billy Brewer	1983–1993	11	67–56–3	.544
Joe Lee Dunn	1994	1	4–7	.364
Tommy Tuberville	1995–1998	4	25–20	.556
David Cutcliffe	1998–2004	7	44–29	.603
Ed Orgeron	2005–2007	3	10–25	.286
Houston Nutt	2008–2011	4	18–26	.409
Hugh Freeze	2012–2016	5	39–25	.609
Matt Luke†	2017–2019	3	15–21	.417
Lane Kiffin	2020–2025	6	55–19	.743
Pete Golding	2025–present	1	5–1	.833

† Includes interim status

== Bowl games ==
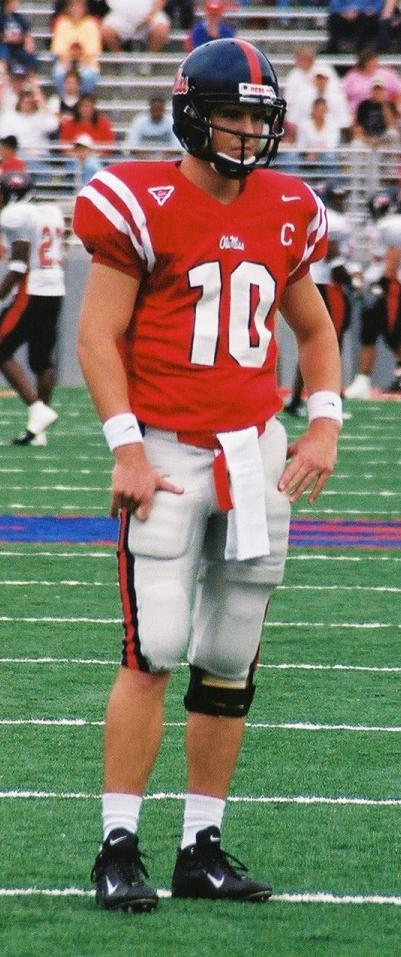
QB Eli Manning

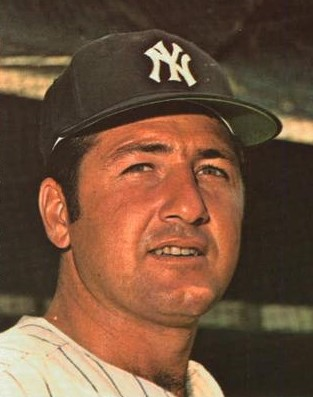
QB Jake Gibbs

Ole Miss has participated in 45 bowl games/playoff games and compiled a record of 29–16 through the 2025 season. The school's victory in the 2013 BBVA Compass Bowl was subsequently vacated and is not included.

Season	Coach	Bowl	Opponent	Result
1935	Ed Walker	Orange Bowl	Catholic University	L 19–20
1948	Johnny Vaught	Delta Bowl	TCU	W 13–9
1952	Johnny Vaught	Sugar Bowl	Georgia Tech	L 7–24
1954	Johnny Vaught	Sugar Bowl	Navy	L 0–21
1955	Johnny Vaught	Cotton Bowl Classic	TCU	W 14–13
1957	Johnny Vaught	Sugar Bowl	Texas	W 39–7
1958	Johnny Vaught	Gator Bowl	Florida	W 7–3
1959	Johnny Vaught	Sugar Bowl	LSU	W 21–0
1960	Johnny Vaught	Sugar Bowl	Rice	W 14–6
1961	Johnny Vaught	Cotton Bowl Classic	Texas	L 7–12
1962	Johnny Vaught	Sugar Bowl	Arkansas	W 17–13
1963	Johnny Vaught	Sugar Bowl	Alabama	L 7–12
1964	Johnny Vaught	Bluebonnet Bowl	Tulsa	L 7–14
1965	Johnny Vaught	Liberty Bowl	Auburn	W 13–7
1966	Johnny Vaught	Bluebonnet Bowl	Texas	L 0–19
1967	Johnny Vaught	Sun Bowl	UTEP	L 7–14
1968	Johnny Vaught	Liberty Bowl	Virginia Tech	W 34–17
1969	Johnny Vaught	Sugar Bowl	Arkansas	W 27–22
1970	Johnny Vaught	Gator Bowl	Auburn	L 28–35
1971	Billy Kinard	Peach Bowl	Georgia Tech	W 41–18
1983	Billy Brewer	Independence Bowl	Air Force	L 3–9
1986	Billy Brewer	Independence Bowl	Texas Tech	W 20–17
1989	Billy Brewer	Liberty Bowl	Air Force	W 42–29
1990	Billy Brewer	Gator Bowl	Michigan	L 3–35
1992	Billy Brewer	Liberty Bowl	Air Force	W 13–0
1997	Tommy Tuberville	Motor City Bowl	Marshall	W 34–31
1998	David Cutcliffe	Independence Bowl	Texas Tech	W 35–18
1999	David Cutcliffe	Independence Bowl	Oklahoma	W 27–25
2000	David Cutcliffe	Music City Bowl	West Virginia	L 38–49
2002	David Cutcliffe	Independence Bowl	Nebraska	W 27–23
2003	David Cutcliffe	Cotton Bowl Classic	Oklahoma State	W 31–28
2008	Houston Nutt	Cotton Bowl Classic	Texas Tech	W 47–34
2009	Houston Nutt	Cotton Bowl Classic	Oklahoma State	W 21–7
2012	Hugh Freeze	BBVA Compass Bowl	Pittsburgh	38–17 (vacated)
2013	Hugh Freeze	Music City Bowl	Georgia Tech	W 25–17
2014	Hugh Freeze	Peach Bowl †	TCU	L 3–42
2015	Hugh Freeze	Sugar Bowl †	Oklahoma State	W 48–20
2020	Lane Kiffin	Outback Bowl	Indiana	W 26–20
2021	Lane Kiffin	Sugar Bowl †	Baylor	L 7–21
2022	Lane Kiffin	Texas Bowl	Texas Tech	L 25–42
2023	Lane Kiffin	Peach Bowl †	Penn State	W 38–25
2024	Lane Kiffin	Gator Bowl	Duke	W 52–20
2025	Pete Golding	CFP First Round †	Tulane	W 41–10
2025	Pete Golding	Sugar Bowl (Quarterfinal) †	Georgia	W 39–34
2025	Pete Golding	Fiesta Bowl (Semifinal) †	Miami (FL)	L 27-31

† New Year's Six/CFP

== CFP Games ==
Season	Round	Opponent	Result
2025 (6)	CFP First Round; Sugar Bowl; Fiesta Bowl	11 Tulane; 3 Georgia; 10 Miami (FL)	W 41–10; W 39–34; L 27-31

== Milestones ==
- Most points scored in a game by Ole Miss came in a 114–0 win over Union College on October 29, 1904.
- Ole Miss became the nation's first college football team to fly "en masse" to a game in 1937. The team flew from Memphis to Philadelphia to play Temple University Temple Owls. (University of New Mexico took the first flight of any team in 1929.)
- Ole Miss' first game to be broadcast on television was in 1948 against Memphis.
- The speed limit on the Ole Miss campus is 18 mph in honor of Archie Manning, who wore the number during his playing days at Ole Miss. After Archie's son Eli Manning won his second Super Bowl, the university changed the speed limit in some areas of campus to 10 mph to honor the former All-American Rebel.
- Ole Miss plays a central role in Michael Lewis' book The Blind Side: Evolution of a Game and its 2009 film adaptation, The Blind Side.

== Notable games ==
- 1952: Maryland- The 11th-ranked Rebels splashed onto the national scene by defeating the 3rd-ranked Maryland Terrapins in Oxford on November 15, 1952, by the score of 21–14. This game is credited by many for being the catalyst to the great run the Rebels had from 1952 to 1963.
- 1959: LSU- On Halloween night, No. 3-ranked Ole Miss squared off with No. 1-ranked LSU in Baton Rouge, LA. The game was a defensive struggle with the Rebels clinging to a 3–0 lead in the fourth quarter. Future Heisman winner Billy Cannon changed the game off a fortuitous bounce on a punt return that went 89 yards. The replay is still played whenever a reference to this rivalry is made. Ole Miss had one last chance to pull off the win, but was stopped short on 4th and a yard at the goal-line by Billy Cannon. LSU won 7–3.
- 1960: LSU- On January 1, 1960, one of the most anticipated rematches in college football history took place, but No. 2-ranked Ole Miss dominated No. 1-ranked LSU from start to finish and came away with a decisive 21–0 win over the Tigers. The Rebels finished the season having only given up 21 points all year, declared national champions by several polls, and named the third-rated team in history (through 1995) by the Sagarin ratings, behind only two great Nebraska teams.
- 1969: Tennessee More affectionately known as, "The Mule Game" or "The Jackson Massacre", the 18th-ranked Rebels faced off against the 3rd-ranked Tennessee Volunteers in Jackson MS. Prior to the game, Tennessee's Steve Kiner was interviewed by Sports Illustrated. When asked about the Rebels and all their horses in the backfield, Kiner replied, "...more like a bunch of mules." When asked specifically about Archie Manning, he responded, "Archie who?" This inspired the Rebels and to a 38–0 shellacking of the Vols, a win that pushed the Rebels into the 1970 Sugar Bowl
- 1977: Notre Dame- On a hot, humid day, the Rebels took advantage of the weather to stun the third-ranked Irish 20–13. It was the only loss for the Irish that season as they went on to claim the 1977 AP national championship.
- 1986: LSU- Billy Brewer's 5–2–1 Rebels entered Tiger Stadium, where they had not won since 1968, to face 12-ranked LSU. Ole Miss sophomore quarterback Mark Young and the Rebels built a 21–9 halftime lead. LSU stormed back in the second. With 12:09 remaining, LSU's David Browndyke booted a 21-yard FG that trimmed the lead to 21–19. Later, LSU QB Tommy Hodson led the Tigers from the LSU 34 to the Rebel 13. But with only 0:09 to play, Browndyke's potential game-winning 30-yard FG sailed wide left and ignited a wild celebration among Rebel fans jammed into southeast corner of Tiger Stadium.
- 1997: LSU—After a harsh two-season bowl ban, Tommy Tuberville's 1997 Rebels squad arrived in Baton Rouge with a 3–2 record and in search of a signature win. Meanwhile, the 5–1 and No. 8-ranked Tigers entered fresh off an upset of then No. 1-ranked Florida. After trailing 21–14 at the half, the Rebels dominated the second half, outscoring the Tigers 22–0 en route to a 36–21 win. Ole Miss QB Stewart Patridge threw for a career-high 346 yards with two touchdowns. John Avery rushed for 137 yards and two scores. Their combined efforts accounted for all but five of the Rebels' 488 yards of total offense. The celebrated win at Tiger Stadium was the first for Ole Miss over a top 10 opponent since 1977. Ole Miss fished the season with a record of 8–4 (4–4 SEC) that included a Motor City Bowl win over Marshall.
- 2003 vs LSU: The Rebels were enjoying their best season, and first shot at an SEC title, in forty years. They just needed to beat the visiting LSU Tigers. Ole Miss jumped out to an early lead on a pick six, but the offense and special teams struggled, and a long touchdown pass by LSU early in the fourth quarter gave the Tigers a cushion. Late in the fourth the Rebels attempted a game winning drive. On fourth down Eli dropped back to throw but fell down, sealing the win for the Tigers, who ended up winning the division on the head to head tiebreaker.
- 2008: Florida- After three years of SEC purgatory, the Rebels desperately needed a spark. That spark came in the form of defeating the fourth ranked Florida Gators 31–30 in Gainesville. Ole Miss took a 31–24 lead with 5 minutes to go in the game on an 86-yard touchdown pass thrown by Jevan Snead to Shay Hodge. Florida responded within two minutes to bring the game within one, only to have their PAT blocked by Kentrell Lockett. Florida regained possession but turned the ball over on downs after Heisman winner Tim Tebow was stopped on fourth-and-one. The win would catapult the Rebels to back-to-back Cotton Bowl victories. The win gave Ole Miss their 600th win all-time.
- 2014: Alabama- The 11th-ranked Ole Miss Rebels fought back from a 14–3 halftime deficit to knock off No. 3-ranked Alabama for the first time since 2003. Led by senior quarterback Bo Wallace's 3 touchdown passes and the nation's 2nd ranked defense, the Rebels made an emphatic statement that they were real title contenders.
- 2015: Alabama- On September 19, 2015, Head Coach Hugh Freeze's AP No. 15 Rebels beat the AP No. 2 Alabama Crimson Tide, 43–37, in Tuscaloosa, making Freeze only the third head coach, along with Les Miles and Steve Spurrier, to defeat a Nick Saban-coached team in back-to-back years. It was also the first time Ole Miss had beaten any Alabama team twice in a row and only the second Rebel win in Tuscaloosa (the only other having come in 1988 under Billy Brewer). The Tide turned the ball over five times, a number which includes two attempted kickoff returns and three interceptions by three different Ole Miss defenders, Trae Elston, C.J. Johnson, and Tony Bridges. The 2015 victory catapulted the Rebels to the No. 3 spot in the Associated Press Week 3 rankings.
- 2023: Penn State- December 30, 2023, for the first time in Ole Miss' 129 seasons of college football, the Rebels won 11 games, capping off the season with a 38-25 victory over No. 10 Penn State in the Chick-fil-A Peach Bowl inside Mercedes-Benz Stadium. The Ole Miss offense picked apart the nation's top defense, recording the most points (38), passing yards (394) and total yards (540) Penn State had allowed the whole season. Those 540 yards marked the second straight bowl game for Ole Miss with at least 500 yards of total offense, again displaying head coach Lane Kiffin's offensive prowess in his second New Year's Six appearance at the helm for the Rebels.
- 2024: Georgia- November 9, 2024, #16 Ole Miss defeated #3 Georgia 28-10 in front of a record crowd of 68,126. Ole Miss quarterback Jaxson Dart threw a disastrous interception during the Rebels' opening drive, setting up Georgia near the Ole Miss endzone. Georgia would later score and go up 7-0, but that would be the only touchdown they would score for the remainder of the game. Jaxson Dart left the game with an apparent ankle injury, resulting in backup quarterback Austin Simmons entering the game. Simmons helped lead the Rebels to a touchdown drive to tie the game at 7-7, and Dart came back in on their next drive. The Rebels went into halftime with a 16-7 lead after kicking 3 Caden Davis field goals over the course of the second quarter. Georgia subsequently got a field goal to make it 16-10 after halftime, but they would not score any more points. Jaxson Dart threw a 10-yard pass to Juice Wells to make the score 22-10 but the Rebels couldn't get the 2-point conversion. Ole Miss kicked 2 more field goals in the 4th quarter and won 28-10. The fans stormed the field with 16 seconds on the clock and were told to push back, as the game wasn't technically over. When the game did end, however, the fans tore down the goalposts in celebration. This was Ole Miss' first win over a Top 5 opponent since 2015 when they beat Alabama in Tuscaloosa, and Lane Kiffin's first Top 5 win as Ole Miss head coach.

== Uniforms ==
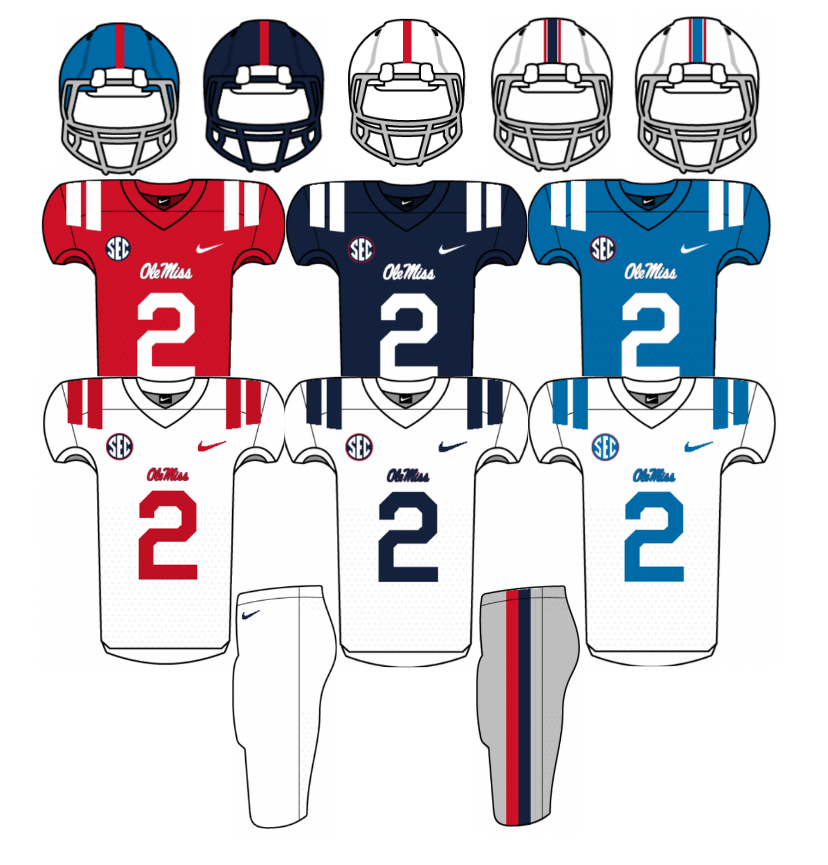
Ole Miss Uniforms

Ole Miss primarily uses four jersey options along with two pant styles and two helmet variations. They often mix and match these jerseys, helmets, and pants to create a wide range of uniform combinations. Since the 2017 season, Ole Miss has taken the field in at least ten different uniform combinations. The Rebels have traditionally used red jerseys for their primary home uniforms and blue jerseys as alternates; both have bold white numbers and white vertical shoulder stripes. The Rebels have also made extensive use of their new "powder blues," a uniform combination consisting of solid white pants, a powder blue jersey with white shoulder stripes, and the powder blue helmet. This uniform combination started as an alternate uniform, but has become very popular among fans and players; since the 2020 season it has been worn as the primary home uniform. White jerseys with red numbers and stripes are typically used on the road. These jerseys are paired with either gray pants with red and blue stripes or solid white pants, though for the 2018 season were paired with white pants with red stripes as part of a "white out" uniform combination. A similar white road uniform with navy stripes and letters has also been used.

Typically, Ole Miss uses one of two helmet designs. The Rebels' traditional primary helmet is navy blue with a single red stripe and "Ole Miss" written in script on each side. The other helmet's blue is a lighter color, a shade known as "powder blue." In recent years, the powder blue helmet has seen more and more use. Since its reintroduction in the 2014 season, the Rebels have worn powder blue helmets in over half their games, typically with their red or white jerseys, and have arguably become the team's primary helmet.

In 2017, Ole Miss used special helmets for a military-appreciation game against Louisiana and a rivalry game against LSU. The military appreciation helmets, which have been worn multiple times since then in both navy and powder blue variations, were the same as the primary design, except the logo on each side of the helmet was filled with an American flag design. The helmets worn against LSU were powder blue with jersey numbers on each side, similar to a design worn by the Rebels in the 1960s.

In 2022, Ole Miss debuted new alternate helmets in partnership with Realtree Outdoors, a camouflage and apparel company, for their game against Kentucky. The helmets featured a unique camouflage design, called WAV3, created by Realtree's experts. This collaboration between Ole Miss Athletics and Realtree had been in development for several months prior. Realtree's founder and CEO, Bill Jordan, is an Ole Miss alumnus who played wide receiver for the Rebels in the early 1970s and has remained closely connected to the program. The Jordan family name is prominently displayed on the indoor field at the Manning Center.

In 2024, Ole Miss also revealed new alternate away uniforms during a game against Wake Forest that featured a white jersey, powder blue numbers and stripes with red accents. In the same season, they unveiled the second edition their WAV3 collaboration helmets with Realtree Outdoors in a game against Oklahoma.

Player names were added to jerseys by Billy Brewer in 1983. They were removed during Ed Orgeron's three seasons, then restored permanently by Houston Nutt.

== Rivalries ==
=== Alabama ===
The Alabama–Ole Miss football rivalry is an American college football rivalry between the Alabama Crimson Tide and Ole Miss Rebels. Both universities are founding members of the Southeastern Conference (SEC), and competed in the SEC Western Division from 1992-2023.

It has been one of the conference's most lopsided rivalries. Alabama leads the series 53–10–2 (50–9–2 without NCAA vacations and forfeits). From 2004 to 2013, Alabama won every game between the two teams, including six wins by double digits. However, in 2014, No. 11 Ole Miss beat No. 3 Alabama 23–17 for the first time since 2003. Ole Miss cornerback Senquez Golson sealed the victory with an interception in the fourth quarter. The victory catapulted Ole Miss to No. 3 in the AP Poll, their highest ranking since 1964. In 2015, Ole Miss visited Alabama as double digit underdogs. The Rebels upset the No. 2 Crimson Tide 43–37 for their second ever victory in Tuscaloosa. This marked the first time Ole Miss had beaten Alabama in back to back seasons. Following the upset, Ole Miss jumped to No. 3 in the AP Poll, marking the first time that Ole Miss had been ranked in the top three in consecutive seasons since 1963–64.

=== Arkansas ===
Ole Miss first played Arkansas in 1908, with Arkansas winning 33–0. They played each other many times, sporadically, over the next several decades, including two meetings in the Sugar Bowl in 1963 and 1970; Ole Miss won both.

They have played each other annually since 1981. In the 1980s, Arkansas dominated. The 1990 game ended memorably. Having the ball inside the Ole Miss 20 and trailing by 4, with seconds remaining, Arkansas needed a score. The Hogs handed the ball to running back Ron Dickerson who seemed to have an open path to the endzone. At the goal line, Safety Chris Mitchell stopped Dickerson at the one yard line as time expired. In 1991, Arkansas joined the Southeastern Conference. The next year the SEC divided into two divisions. Both teams were placed in the SEC West. Ole Miss won the first conference contest in Little Rock 17–3.

During the 2000s, the rivalry was reignited by a series of close games and coaching changes. The 2001 Ole Miss–Arkansas game set an NCAA record for most overtime periods played (7). Arkansas won 58–56 off a 2-point Rebel conversion that got stopped just short of the goal line. Since then, five FBS football games have reached seven overtime periods. In 2007, Houston Nutt resigned as Arkansas head coach and was hired by Ole Miss' a week later.2008 saw the first game between Ole Miss and Arkansas after Nutt left Arkansas to coach Ole Miss. The Rebels kicked a field goal with less than 3 minutes remaining to go up 23–14, but Arkansas scored with a minute left. Arkansas was awarded with the recovery of an onside kick, but received a penalty for offensive pass interference before turning the ball over on downs. Ole Miss and Nutt won 23–21. The following season, Ole Miss won 30–17 led by running back Dexter McCluster who had over 200 all purpose yards, including a 60 yd touchdown. In 2010, Arkansas finally beat Nutt after a 38–24 game in Fayetteville. In 2015, the Rebels' 52–53 loss to Arkansas saw them fall out of first place in the SEC West and lose the division.

Through 2025, Arkansas leads the series, 37–33–1, but Ole Miss has won seven of the last nine, including the last four in a row.

=== Auburn ===
The Auburn–Ole Miss football rivalry, dating back to their first meeting in 1928, is one of the oldest matchups in the Southeastern Conference (SEC). Both founding members of the SEC, the two teams have met annually since 1990, following their placement in the SEC West division in 1992. The rivalry gained additional intensity in 1999 when former Ole Miss head coach Tommy Tuberville controversially left to coach at Auburn. More recently, the rivalry intensified with reports that current Ole Miss head coach Lane Kiffin was in negotiations for the vacant head coaching position at Auburn in 2022. These rumors were later confirmed true but Kiffin declined to pursue it. Later, Auburn hired former Ole Miss football coach Hugh Freeze. Auburn leads the series 35–12 through the 2023 season.

=== LSU ===
Ole Miss first played LSU on December 3, 1894, winning 26–6 in Baton Rouge, Louisiana. Throughout the fifties and sixties, games between the two schools featured highly ranked squads on both sides and several matchups had conference, and at times, national title implications. Since then, the rivalry has only had one contest with significant national title implications. The 2003 loss to LSU decided the SEC Western Division Champion, and helped propel LSU to a national championship.

The student bodies at both universities created a trophy for the LSU–Ole Miss rivalry in 2008, and renamed the matchup the "Magnolia Bowl." Ole Miss won the first two official Magnolia Bowls in 2008 31–13 and 2009 25–23. LSU won their first official Magnolia Bowl in 2010 with a last minute score, 43–36.

The 2010s featured several memorable Magnolia Bowls. LSU humiliated the Rebels 52–3 at Oxford in 2010. Les Miles ordered third-string quarterback Zach Mettenberger to take a knee four times after LSU gained a first-and-goal at the Ole Miss 1-yard line with five minutes to play. The Rebels lost the 2012 Magnolia Bowl 35–41 during the last minute of the game when LSU's Jeremy Hill scored a 1 yd touchdown run. On October 19, 2013, an unranked Rebel team beat the No. 6 ranked Tigers 27–24 on a last-second 46-yard field goal. In 2014, Ole Miss entered with a No. 3 ranking. No. 24 LSU pulled the upset by beating the Rebels 10–7 on a last–minute interception thrown by Rebels' quarterback Bo Wallace. In 2015, No. 22 Ole Miss upset No. 15 LSU 38–17, which was Ole Miss's largest margin of victory over LSU since 1992. After 2015, Ole Miss would not beat LSU again until 2021, when the No. 12 Rebels won 31–17 in front of a sellout crowd on the day Ole Miss Legend Eli Manning's jersey was being retired. The following year, however, unranked LSU won convincingly 45–20 over No. 7 Ole Miss in Death Valley after the Rebels suffered a second half collapse. In 2023, in front of 66,703 fans (the largest crowd in Vaught-Hemingway Stadium history), #20 Ole Miss defeated #13 LSU 55–49 in what was the highest-scoring game in the rivalry.

LSU leads the overall series over Ole Miss 64–44–4; since the creation of the Magnolia Bowl, LSU leads the series, 9–7. The home team has won 12 of the last 14 meetings, and Ole Miss has lost the last eight matchups at Tiger Stadium. The Tigers and Rebels will continue the series yearly through at least 2029 under the SEC's new nine-game conference schedule.

=== Memphis ===
The Ole Miss–Memphis football rivalry has also been a far less competitive rivalry series. The Rebels hold a 47–12–2 advantage over the Tigers in this non-conference series. The two schools have met 62 times from 1921 to 2019.

Ole Miss won every game between 2005 and 2009, and the teams temporarily suspended competition from 2010 to 2013. The rivalry was resumed in 2014. Ole Miss won the game 24–3 to increase their winning streak against Memphis to six straight. In 2015, The Tigers upset No. 13 Ole Miss, 37–24. The Rebels fell 11 spots in the AP Poll to No. 24 and Memphis entered the rankings at No. 18. It was the Tigers' first victory over a ranked team since defeating No. 6 Tennessee in 1996. Memphis won the most recent matchup 15–10 on August 31, 2019. As of 2020, there are no future games scheduled between the two teams.

=== Mississippi State ===
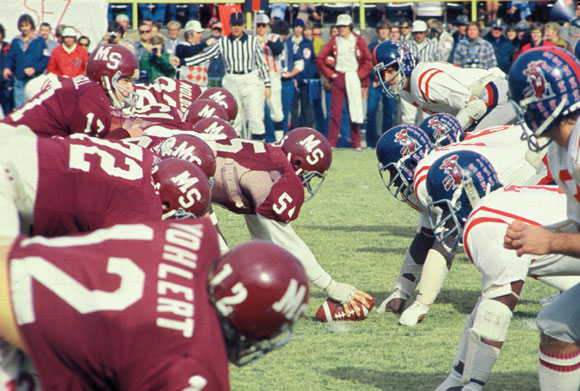
Ole Miss and MSU meet in the 1975 Egg Bowl

The Battle for the Golden Egg (nicknamed the Egg Bowl) is the Rebels' last game of the season against in-state SEC rival Mississippi State University (MSU). The teams have played each other 114 times since 1901, and the first game officially known as "The Battle of the Golden Egg" was in 1927. The game gets its name from the trophy awarded to the winner of the contest; the football element of the trophy is based on the much more ovoid and rounded football used in 1927 when it was designed, and resembles a large golden egg. While it is called a "Bowl", the game is not a postseason bowl game but a regular season SEC game. Twenty-nine Egg Bowls have been played on Thanksgiving Day. Ole Miss leads the series with 64–46–6.

In 2014, the game gained much more national attention due to the postseason implications the game possessed. Although both teams were considered to be Playoff contenders mid-season when the Bulldogs were #1 and the Rebels were #3, they each suffered a loss (Mississippi State had 1 loss at the time while Ole Miss had 3 losses). The postseason implications were still high, however. Mississippi State entered the game with a No. 4 ranking in College Football Playoff, and had a spot in the Playoff on the line entering the game against No. 19 Ole Miss. MSU also had a chance at making the SEC title game, where they needed a win and an Alabama loss. In an upset, Ole Miss beat the Bulldogs 31–17 and jumped from No. 19 to No. 9 in the College Football Playoff rankings. Both schools got New Year's Six bowl games, although neither would win their bowl games (Ole Miss lost 42–3 to TCU in the Peach Bowl on December 31, and later that night, Mississippi State lost 49–34 to Georgia Tech in the Orange Bowl).

Ole Miss entered the 2015 Egg Bowl with a No. 18 ranking in the College Football Playoff rankings, and MSU was No. 21. The game was considered to be a play-in game for the Sugar Bowl as Florida, who had been predicted by many to get the bid, lost 27–2 to rival Florida State that same day. Ole Miss entered the game as only two point favorites but won the Egg Bowl convincingly 38–27 and led by 25 points at halftime. This was Ole Miss's first road win against Mississippi State since 2003, and the first time that the Rebels beat the Bulldogs two years in a row since 2003–04.

In 2023, the 12th ranked Ole Miss Rebels shut down Mississippi State 17-7 to win Battle for the Golden Egg on Thanksgiving night. Quinshon Judkins rushed for 119 yards and a touchdown, and Jaxson Dart threw a 26-yard touchdown pass to Caden Prieskorn early in the fourth quarter to give the Rebels a 10-point lead they would not relinquish.

2025 saw Ole Miss win its final game of the Lane Kiffin era 38-19 in Starkville. Two days later Kiffin would leave to go to LSU.

=== Tulane ===
Ole Miss and Tulane have been rivals since the time that Tulane was an SEC member. Ole Miss leads the series 44–28 through the 2025 season. The Rebels have dominated the rivalry in recent decades, they currently (as of 2025) hold an 12-game winning streak versus the Green Wave, dating all the way back to 1989. As of their last game in 2025, where Ole Miss won 45-10, no future games have been scheduled.

=== Vanderbilt ===
Vanderbilt and Ole Miss played annually between 1942 and 2023. When the SEC split into divisions in 1992, the Commodores and Rebels were selected as permanent cross-division rivals. Ole Miss leads the all-time series 54–40–2. The Rebels have won 18 of the last 26 games, including eleven games by double digits. However, Vanderbilt has sustained the rivalry with a surprising blow-out victory over the Rebels in 2016.

== Team of the Century ==
In 1992, to commemorate the 100th year of Ole Miss football, the Ole Miss Athletic Department put together a so-called "Team of the Century," recognizing the outstanding accomplishments of 26 players.

The head coach for the Team of the Century was Johnny Vaught, who coached Ole Miss from 1947 to 1970 and again in 1973.

=== Offense ===
Position	Player	Years	Hometown
QB	Archie Manning	1968–70	Drew, MS
RB	Charlie Conerly	1942, 46–47	Clarksdale, MS
RB	John "Kayo" Dottley	1947–50	McGehee, AR
RB	Charlie Flowers	1957–59	Marianna, AR
E	Floyd Franks	1968–70	Biloxi, MS
E	Barney Poole	1942, 47–48	Gloster, MS
C	Dawson Pruett	1987–90	Mobile, AL
OL	Jim Dunaway	1960–62	Columbia, MS
OL	Gene Hickerson	1955–57	Atwood, TN
OL	Stan Hindman	1963–65	Newton, MS
OL	Everett Lindsay	1989–92	Raleigh, NC
OL	Marvin Terrell	1957–59	Indianola, MS

=== Defense ===
Position	Player	Years	Hometown
DL	Frank "Bruiser" Kinard	1935–37	Jackson, MS
DL	Kelvin Pritchett	1988–90	Atlanta, GA
DL	Ben Williams	1972–75	Yazoo City, MS
LB	Tony Bennett	1986–89	Alligator, MS
LB	Kenny Dill	1961–63	West Point, MS
LB	Larry Grantham	1957–59	Crystal Springs, MS
LB	Freddie Joe Nunn	1981–84	Noxubee Co., MS
DB	Billy Brewer	1957–59	Columbus, MS
DB	Glenn Cannon	1967–69	Gulfport, MS
DB	Chris Mitchell	1987–90	Town Creek, AL
DB	Jimmy Patton	1952–54	Greenville, MS
DB	Todd Sandroni	1987–89	Shaw, MS

=== Special teams ===
Position	Player	Years	Hometown
PK	Robert Khayat	1957–59	Moss Point, MS
P	Jim Miller	1976–79	Ripley, MS

== Hall of Fame ==
=== College Football Hall of Fame ===
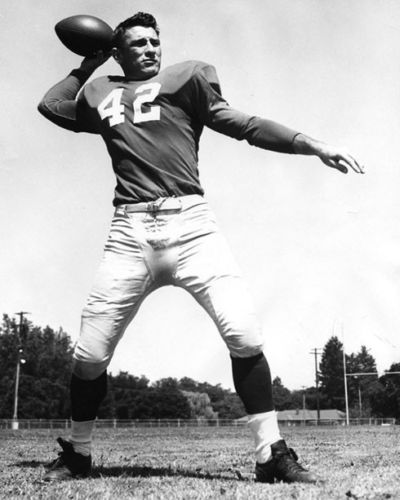
HB Charlie Conerly

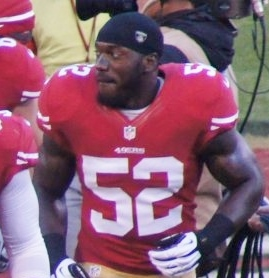
LB Patrick Willis

Ole Miss has nine players and two coaches in the College Football Hall of Fame.

Player	Position	Inducted
Frank M. "Bruiser" Kinard	T	1951†
Charles "Charlie" Conerly	HB	1965
Barney Poole	End	1974
Johnny Vaught	Coach	1979
Doug Kenna‡	QB	1984
Thad "Pie" Vann	Coach	1987
Archie Manning	QB	1989
Parker Hall	HB	1991
Jerry Dean "Jake" Gibbs	QB	1995
Charlie Flowers	FB	1997
Wesley Walls	TE	2014
Patrick Willis	LB	2019

† Charter member

‡ Played freshman year at Ole Miss, then appointed to the U.S. Military Academy where he played for Army as a sophomore, junior and senior

=== Pro Football Hall of Fame ===
There have been three Ole Miss players inducted into the Pro Football Hall of Fame.

Player	Position	Inducted
Frank M. "Bruiser" Kinard	G	1971
Gene Hickerson	T	2007
Patrick Willis	LB	2024

=== Helms Athletic Foundation Hall of Fame ===
Player	Position	Inducted
Frank M. "Bruiser" Kinard	T	1955
Charles "Charlie" Conerly	HB	1959
Barney Poole	End	1966
Louis N. Pappas	—	2005

=== National Quarterback Club Hall of Fame ===
Ole Miss has one former player in the National Quarterback Club Hall of Fame.

Player	Inducted
Archie Manning	1995

== Ole Miss and the NFL ==
=== First Round Picks ===
Year	Pick	Player	Team	Position
1939	3	Parker Hall	Cleveland Rams	RB
1942	8	Merle Hapes	New York Giants	FB
1954	10	Ed Beatty	Los Angeles Rams	C
1961	10	Bobby Crespino	Cleveland Browns	DE
1963	3	Jim Dunaway	Minnesota Vikings	OT
1966	8	Mike Dennis †	Buffalo Bills	RB
1966	11	Stan Hindman	San Francisco 49ers	OT
1971	2	Archie Manning	New Orleans Saints	QB
1985	18	Freddie Nunn	St. Louis Cardinals	DE
1990	18	Tony Bennett	Green Bay Packers	LB
1991	20	Kelvin Pritchett	Dallas Cowboys	DT
1994	20	Tim Bowens	Miami Dolphins	DT
1998	29	John Avery	Miami Dolphins	RB
2001	23	Deuce McAllister	New Orleans Saints	RB
2004	1	Eli Manning	San Diego Chargers	QB
2005	26	Chris Spencer	Seattle Seahawks	C
2007	11	Patrick Willis	San Francisco 49ers	LB
2009	23	Michael Oher	Baltimore Ravens	OT
2009	24	Peria Jerry	Atlanta Falcons	DT
2016	13	Laremy Tunsil	Miami Dolphins	OT
2016	23	Laquon Treadwell	Minnesota Vikings	WR
2016	29	Robert Nkemdiche	Arizona Cardinals	DT
2017	23	Evan Engram	New York Giants	TE
2025	16	Walter Nolen	Arizona Cardinals	DT
2025	25	Jaxson Dart	New York Giants	QB

† Drafted in the AFL Draft

=== Active in the NFL ===
*Only includes players who have been on an NFL active roster, Practice Squad, or IR during the 2026-27 NFL season.

==== Active Roster or Injured Reserve ====
- Trey Amos, CB, Washington Commanders
- A. J. Brown, WR, New England Patriots
- Ben Brown, OG, New England Patriots
- Tahj Chambers, LB, Indianapolis Colts
- Jaxson Dart, QB, New York Giants
- Evan Engram, TE, Denver Broncos
- Kapena Gushiken, S, Indianapolis Colts
- Tre Harris, WR, Los Angeles Chargers
- Jared Ivey, LB, Atlanta Falcons
- Cedric Johnson, DE, Cincinnati Bengals
- D. J. Jones, DL, Denver Broncos
- Jaylon Jones, CB, Jacksonville Jaguars
- Dawson Knox, TE, Buffalo Bills
- Deane Leonard, CB, Los Angeles Chargers
- DK Metcalf, WR, Pittsburgh Steelers
- Jonathan Mingo, WR, Dallas Cowboys
- Elijah Moore, WR, Philadelphia Eagles
- Walter Nolen, DL, Arizona Cardinals
- JJ Pegues, DT, Las Vegas Raiders
- Diego Pounds, OT, Kansas City Chiefs
- Tavius Robinson, OLB, Baltimore Ravens
- De'Zhaun Stribling, WR, San Francisco 49ers
- Laremy Tunsil, OL, Washington Commanders
- Princely Umanmielen, DE, Carolina Panthers
- Jordan Watkins, WR, San Francisco 49ers
- Jayden Williams, OT, Arizona Cardinals
- Sam Williams, DE, Cleveland Browns
- Wydett Williams, FS, Arizona Cardinals

==== Practice Squad ====
- A.J. Finley, S, Seattle Seahawks
- Laquon Treadwell, WR, Indianapolis Colts
- Harrison Wallace III, WR, Arizona Cardinals
- Trey Washington, S, Indianapolis Colts
- Antwane Wells Jr., WR, Atlanta Falcons
- Kenny Yeboah, TE, Arizona Cardinals

== Team honors ==
=== Chucky Mullins Courage Award ===
At the end of each spring's practices, the team plays the Grove Bowl, which pits Ole Miss players against each other. The senior defensive player who most embodies Chucky Mullins' spirit and courage receives the "Chucky Mullins Memorial Courage Award" and the right to wear Mullins' No. 38 jersey, which was otherwise retired in 2006.

Recipients

- 1990 – Chris Mitchell
- 1991 – Jeff Carter
- 1992 – Trea Southerland
- 1993 – Johnny Dixon
- 1994 – Alundis Brice
- 1995 – Michael Lowery
- 1996 – Derek Jones
- 1997 – Nate Wayne
- 1998 – Gary Thigpen
- 1999 – Ronnie Heard
- 2000 – Anthony Magee
- 2001 – Kevin Thomas
- 2002 – Lanier Goethie
- 2003 – Jamil Northcutt
- 2004 – Eric Oliver
- 2005 – Kelvin Robinson
- 2006 – Patrick Willis
- 2007 – Jeremy Garrett
- 2008 – Jamarca Sanford
- 2009 – Marcus Tillman
- 2010 – Kentrell Lockett
- 2011 – D. T. Shackelford
- 2012 – Jason Jones
- 2013 – Mike Marry
- 2014 – D. T. Shackelford
- 2015 – Mike Hilton
- 2016 – John Youngblood
- 2017 – Marquis Haynes
- 2018 – C. J. Moore
- 2019 – Austrian Robinson
- 2020 – Jaylon Jones
- 2021 – Keidron Smith
- 2022 – KD Hill
- 2023 – Cedric Johnson
- 2024 – JJ Pegues
- 2025 – Tyler Banks
- 2026 – Suntarine Perkins

=== Retired numbers ===
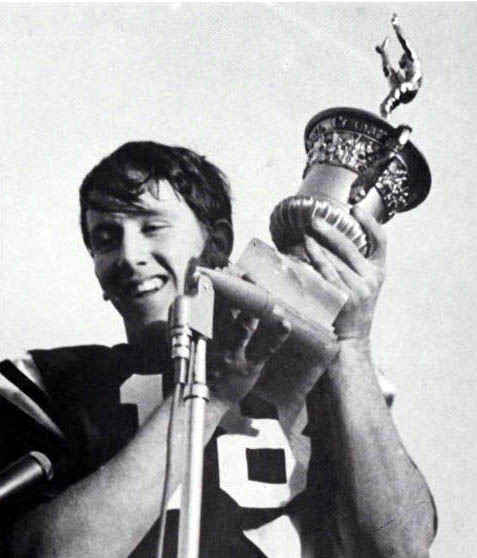
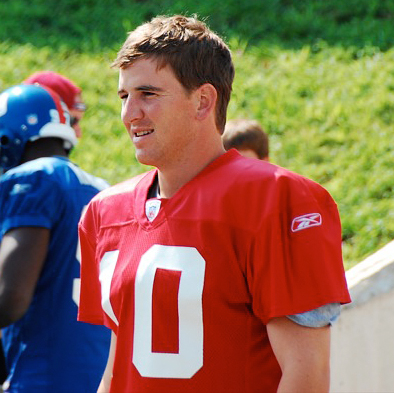
Archie Manning (left) and his son Eli have their numbers retired by Ole Miss

Ole Miss Rebels retired numbers
No.	Player	Pos.	Tenure	No. ret.	Ref.
10	Eli Manning	QB	1999–2003	2021	
18	Archie Manning	QB	1968–1970	1971	
38	Chucky Mullins (Note: Retired from football after a serious injury that left him a quadriplegic during a game against the Vanderbilt Commodores in 1989.)	CB	1988–1989	2006	
74	Ben Williams (Note: Regarded as the first black player in the program's history.)	DT	1972–1975	2022	

== Future opponents ==
=== Conference opponents ===
From 1992 to 2023, Ole Miss played in the West Division of the SEC and played each opponent in the division each year along with several teams from the East Division. In 2024, the SEC expanded the conference to 16 teams and eliminated its two divisions, creating a new scheduling format for the Rebels to play against the other members of the conference. Only the 2024 conference schedule was announced on June 14, 2023, while the conference considered a new format for the future. Alabama and Auburn were off the schedule for the first time since the SEC expanded to 12 teams in 1992, and Texas A&M was off for the first time since the Aggies joined the conference in 2012. The 2025 conference schedule, announced on March 20, 2024, assigned teams to play the same opponents as in 2024, with sites changed for equal home and away competition over the course of the two seasons.

In September 2025, the SEC announced its schedule for the 2026–2029 seasons. The new schedule format includes nine in-conference games per year for each team, ensuring that every SEC team plays each other at least once every two years and completes a home-and-away series within four years. The schedule also introduces protected rivalries for each team to maintain traditional matchups. Ole Miss' protected rivalries are with LSU, Mississippi State and Oklahoma.

==== 2026 schedule ====
Date	Opponent	Site	Result
September 6	vs. No. 24 Louisville*	Nissan Stadium; Nashville, TN	W 41–38
September 12	Charlotte*	Vaught–Hemingway Stadium; Oxford, MS	W 41–9
September 19	No. 7 LSU	Vaught–Hemingway Stadium; Oxford, MS (Magnolia Bowl)	W 32–24
September 26	at No. 21 Florida	Ben Hill Griffin Stadium; Gainesville, FL	L 28–52
October 10	at Vanderbilt	FirstBank Stadium; Nashville, TN (rivalry)	W 52–17
October 17	No. 13 Missouri	Vaught–Hemingway Stadium; Oxford, MS	W 31–3
October 24	at Texas	Darrell K Royal–Texas Memorial Stadium; Austin, TX	L 27–34
October 31	Auburn	Vaught–Hemingway Stadium; Oxford, MS (rivalry)	W 45–15
November 7	Georgia	Vaught–Hemingway Stadium; Oxford, MS	
November 14	at Oklahoma	Gaylord Family Oklahoma Memorial Stadium; Norman, OK	
November 21	Wofford*	Vaught–Hemingway Stadium; Oxford, MS	
November 28	Mississippi State	Vaught–Hemingway Stadium; Oxford, MS (Egg Bowl)	
*Non-conference game

=== Non-conference opponents ===
Announced schedules as of September 18, 2026. Ole Miss still must schedule a non-conference game vs. a Power Four opponent or Notre Dame in each season from 2027–2031.

No games scheduled for the 2035–2036 seasons.

2027	2028	2029	2030	2031	2032	2033	2034	2037
Eastern Illinois	South Alabama	at South Alabama	at Oregon State	Jacksonville State	Louisiana Tech	Purdue	at Purdue	Virginia Tech
Charlotte	Alcorn State	Southeast Missouri	Georgia Southern		at Virginia Tech			
Oregon State								
