= 2000 Arkansas Razorbacks football team =

American college football season

2000 Arkansas Razorbacks football

Las Vegas Bowl, L 14–31 vs. UNLV
- Conference: Southeastern Conference
- Western Division
- Record: 6–6 (3–5 SEC)
- Head coach: Houston Nutt (3rd season)
- Offensive scheme: I formation
- Defensive coordinator: John Thompson (1st season)
- Base defense: Multiple
- Captains: Quinton Caver; Randy Garner; Michael Snowden; Rod Stinson
- Home stadium: Razorback Stadium; War Memorial Stadium

2000 Southeastern Conference football standings
	Conf.			Overall
Team	W		L	W		L
Eastern Division
No. 10 Florida x$	7	–	1	10	–	3
No. 19 South Carolina	5	–	3	8	–	4
No. 20 Georgia	5	–	3	8	–	4
Tennessee	5	–	3	8	–	4
Vanderbilt	1	–	7	3	–	8
Kentucky	0	–	8	2	–	9
Western Division
No. 18 Auburn x	6	–	2	9	–	4
No. 22 LSU	5	–	3	8	–	4
Ole Miss	4	–	4	7	–	5
No. 24 Mississippi State	4	–	4	8	–	4
Arkansas	3	–	5	6	–	6
Alabama	3	–	5	3	–	8
Championship: Florida 28, Auburn 6
$ – BCS representative as conference champion; x – Division champion/co-champions; Rankings from AP Poll

The 2000 Arkansas Razorbacks football team represented the University of Arkansas as a member of the Southeastern Conference (SEC) during the 2000 NCAA Division I-A football season. Led by third-year head coach Houston Nutt, the Razorbacks compiled an overall record 6–6 with a mark of 3–5 in conference play, tying for fifth place at the bottom of the standings in the SEC's Western Division. Arkansas was invited to the Las Vegas Bowl, where the Razorbacks lost to UNLV. The team played home games at Razorback Stadium in Fayetteville, Arkansas and War Memorial Stadium in Little Rock, Arkansas.

== Schedule ==
Date	Time	Opponent	Site	TV	Result	Attendance	Source
September 2	8:00 pm	Southwest Missouri State*	War Memorial Stadium; Little Rock, AR		W 38–0	53,946	
September 16	6:00 pm	Boise State*	War Memorial Stadium; Little Rock, AR		W 38–31	54,286	
September 23	8:00 pm	Alabama	Razorback Stadium; Fayetteville, AR	ESPN2	W 28–21	51,482	
September 30	11:30 am	No. 25 Georgia	Razorback Stadium; Fayetteville, AR	JPS	L 7–38	51,162	
October 7	6:00 pm	Louisiana–Monroe*^{†}	Razorback Stadium; Fayetteville, AR		W 52–6	50,947	
October 14	11:30 am	at No. 24 South Carolina	Williams–Brice Stadium; Columbia, SC	JPS	L 7–27	81,935	
October 28	1:00 pm	at No. 25 Auburn	Jordan-Hare Stadium; Auburn, AL	PPV	L 19–21	83,642	
November 4	2:00 pm	Ole Miss	Razorback Stadium; Fayetteville, AR (rivalry)		L 24–38	49,647	
November 11	11:30 am	at Tennessee	Neyland Stadium; Knoxville, TN	JPS	L 20–63	107,262	
November 18	1:00 pm	at No. 13 Mississippi State	Scott Field; Starkville, MS		W 17–10 ^{OT}	40,010	
November 24	1:30 pm	No. 24 LSU	War Memorial Stadium; Little Rock, AR (rivalry)	CBS	W 14–3	43,982	
December 21	7:00 pm	vs. UNLV*	Sam Boyd Stadium; Whitney, NV (Las Vegas Bowl)	ESPN2	L 14–31	29,113	
*Non-conference game; ^{†}Homecoming; Rankings from AP Poll released prior to the game; All times are in Central time

== Roster ==
2000 Arkansas Razorbacks football team roster
Players			Coaches
Offense: Pos. / # / Name / Class	Defense: Pos. / # / Name / Class; FS / 6 / Ken Hamlin / So	Special teams: Pos. / # / Name / Class	Head coach: Houston Nutt; Coordinators/assistant coaches: Mike Markuson (offensive line); Legend: (C) Team captain; (S) Suspended; (I) Ineligible; Injured; Redshirt; Roster
