= Danny Nutt =

American football player and coach (born 1961)

Danny Nutt (born May 7, 1961) is a former college football assistant coach. He served as the Assistant Athletics Director for Player Development at Ole Miss during Houston Nutt's tenure as head coach. His last coaching position was with the Arkansas Razorbacks where he served alongside his brother Houston Nutt before resigning in July 2007 for health conditions.

== Early life and family ==
Danny Nutt was born in Little Rock, Arkansas, where he grew up with his mother Emogene Nutt, father Houston Dale Nutt, and four siblings: Dickey (former head men's basketball coach at Arkansas State University), Houston, and Dennis Nutt, a former NBA player. His parents taught at the Arkansas School for the Deaf at Little Rock, Arkansas for 35 years. His father also served as athletic director and head basketball coach for the school. His father was inducted into the Arkansas Sports Hall of Fame in 2001 for his playing deeds as a basketball player in international deaf competitions and as a coach.

Danny graduated from Little Rock Central High School in 1980, and then moved onto playing quarterback at Arkansas, graduating from the college in 1989.

== College coaching career ==
Nutt served as a graduate assistant at Arkansas and an assistant coach at Appalachian State University (1986–88) and Arkansas Tech (1990–93). He worked as a running backs coach alongside his brother Houston Nutt after he took over at Arkansas before the 1998 season. Danny also assisted Houston Nutt at Boise State University and Murray State University (1994–97).

== Resignation ==
In July 2007, Danny resigned from coaching due to a very serious health condition that included a recurring bleeding of his brain stem, and increasingly impaired hearing (Nutt has been partially deaf since birth). He has gone under surgery and rehabilitation in 1998 for his condition and was in Fayetteville, Arkansas receiving treatment.

“It’s real tough to take,” Jones said. “All of us enjoyed playing for him. He’s a real fun coach to play for and we wanted to play as hard as we could for him. We will miss him a lot.” -Felix Jones

The Arkansas Democrat Gazette reported on 9/23/07: "An ESPN2 cameraman panning the Arkansas coaches' box during the second half spotted former running backs coach Danny Nutt wearing a headset...Nutt was also on the field before the game, but was not dressed in coaching at attire like he was for the Razorbacks' season opener against Troy. Nutt also watched that game from the home coaches' section on the third floor of the Reynolds Razorback Stadium pressbox. He was outfitted in a white coach's polo and black dress slackes for that game."

== Ole Miss ==
Prior to the 2008 football season, Danny followed his brother Houston to the University of Mississippi as Assistant Athletics Director for Player Development.

== Personal life ==
Danny is married to the former Carla Carlton. The couple has four daughters – Dallas, and triplets Ashley, Brenna and Caylan.
