= Houston Nutt =

American football player and coach (born 1957)

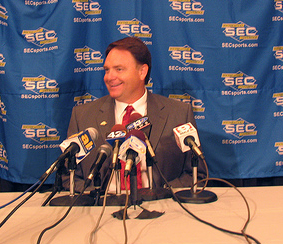
- Nutt at the 2007 SEC Media Days

Biographical details
- Born: October 14, 1957 (age 69); Little Rock, Arkansas, U.S.

Playing career
- 1976–1977: Arkansas
- 1979–1981: Oklahoma State
- Position: Quarterback

Coaching career (HC unless noted)
- 1981–1982: Oklahoma State (GA)
- 1983: Arkansas (GA)
- 1984: Arkansas State (QB)
- 1984–1989: Oklahoma State (QB/WR)
- 1990–1992: Arkansas (WR)
- 1993–1996: Murray State
- 1997: Boise State
- 1998–2007: Arkansas
- 2008–2011: Ole Miss

Head coaching record
- Overall: 135–96
- Bowls: 4–5

Accomplishments and honors

Championships
- 2 OVC (1995–1996); 3 SEC Western Division (1998, 2002, 2006)

Awards
- Eddie Robinson Award (1995); 2× OVC Coach of the Year (1995–1996); 3× SEC Coach of the Year (2001, 2006, 2008); 2× AFCA Division I-AA Region 3 Coach of the Year (1995–1996); AFCA Division I-A Region 2 Coach of the Year (1998); The Football News Division I-A Coach of the Year (1998)

Houston Dale Nutt Jr. (born October 14, 1957) is an American former college football coach and player. He formerly worked for CBS Sports as a college football studio analyst. Previously, he served as the head football coach at Murray State University (1993–1996), Boise State University (1997), the University of Arkansas (1998–2007), and the University of Mississippi (2008–2011).

== Early life and family ==
Houston Nutt Jr. was born in Arkansas, a distant descendant of Haller Nutt and member of the Nutt family, which is prominent in Southern society. He is the son of the late Houston Dale Nutt Sr., and Emogene Nutt and is the oldest of four children. Houston Nutt Sr. briefly played basketball for the University of Kentucky under Adolph Rupp before transferring to Oklahoma A&M (now Oklahoma State) in 1952. Nutt graduated from Little Rock Central High School. His parents taught at the Arkansas School for the Deaf at Little Rock, Arkansas, for 35 years. His father also served as athletic director and head basketball coach for the school. His father was inducted into the Arkansas Sports Hall of Fame in 2001. During his childhood, Houston and his brothers were daily members at the Billy Mitchell Boys and Girls Club in Little Rock.

Wife Diana, like Nutt, graduated from Oklahoma State University. The couple have four children together: Houston III (born March 11, 1987), twins Hailey and Hanna (born September 26, 1988), and Haven (born March 19, 1991).

Nutt's brother Dickey Nutt was the head basketball coach at Arkansas State University until he announced his resignation on February 19, 2008. He was also head coach at Southeast Missouri State of the OVC, before moving on to coach at Stetson University. He is now a special assistant coach at Cleveland State. His brother Danny Nutt served as the Assistant Athletics Director for Player Development at Ole Miss during Houston's tenure as head coach. Nutt's youngest brother Dennis Nutt, a former NBA player, is head men's basketball coach at Ouachita Baptist University.

== College athletic career ==
Nutt was the last player recruited by Arkansas head coach Frank Broyles before his retirement in 1976. Nutt was recruited as a drop-back-style quarterback and started four games as a true freshman after starting quarterback Ron Calcagni was sidelined with an injury. Nutt also played that year for the Southwest Conference champion Arkansas basketball team under coach Eddie Sutton, which went 26–2 and accomplished a 16–0 conference mark.

With the retirement of Broyles, Arkansas hired Lou Holtz as the head football coach. Holtz established an option offense that did not make use of Nutt's passing style and relegated him to the bench as a backup.

Disappointed by his lack of playing time, Nutt transferred to Oklahoma State University and played two years as a backup quarterback. During his time at Oklahoma State, he also played for the basketball team. Nutt graduated from Oklahoma State in 1981 with a degree in physical education.

== Coaching career ==
=== Assistant coaching ===
After graduation, Nutt became a graduate assistant at Oklahoma State under head coach Jimmy Johnson. In 1983, Nutt returned to Arkansas and became a graduate assistant coach under former coach Lou Holtz. In the spring of 1984, Nutt was hired by Arkansas State University as a full-time assistant coach, but he spent only four months there before returning to Oklahoma State that summer as a wide receivers coach.

Nutt spent six seasons as an assistant coach for receivers and quarterbacks at Oklahoma State and was promoted to offensive coordinator in 1989. During his years at Oklahoma State, he helped mentor running back Barry Sanders, who won the 1988 Heisman Trophy, and Buffalo Bills legend Thurman Thomas.

In 1990, Nutt returned to the University of Arkansas as an assistant under head coach Jack Crowe and established a reputation as an excellent recruiter. Nutt remained with the Razorbacks for three seasons and established relationships with Arkansas high school football coaches that would serve him in later years.

=== Murray State ===
In 1993, Nutt received his first head coaching position at NCAA Division I-AA Murray State University. The team went 4–7 and 5–6 in Nutt's first two years.

In 1995, his efforts paid off with an 11–1 record and an Ohio Valley Conference championship after reeling off an 8–0 conference mark. Nutt received Ohio Valley Conference Coach of the Year honors and was recognized with the Eddie Robinson National Division I-AA Coach of the Year Award.

Nutt repeated his success for the 1996 season with an 11–2 record and another undefeated run through his Ohio Valley Conference schedule. Murray State won its first round Division I-AA playoff appearance, earning Nutt the OVC Coach of the Year honors and regional Coach of the Year honors.

=== Boise State ===
Nutt made the step up to NCAA Division I-A the next year when Boise State University hired him to take over their program, which was the lowest ranked of 112 Division I-A schools and had posted a 2–10 record the year before. Two years after making the Division I-AA finals in 1994, the Broncos had an interim head coach in 1996 as head coach Pokey Allen battled cancer. Boise State's first year in Division I-A had been difficult; the school was looking for a recruiter and motivator to jump start their program following Allen's death in late December.

Nutt's team posted a 5–6 record in 1997, playing at the Division I-A level with its Division I-AA players. Nutt's team beat rival Idaho on the road in overtime for the first Boise win in Moscow, Idaho, since 1981. Additionally, Boise State almost pulled off an upset against Wisconsin of the Big Ten, losing 28–24.

=== Arkansas ===
Nutt became the head coach of the University of Arkansas Razorbacks on December 10, 1997, succeeding head coach Danny Ford. Nutt, during his first press conference as coach, immediately mentioned a national championship as his goal and felt that Arkansas had the program to win one. The Razorbacks had suffered through a low period under a succession of head coaches in the previous years, having only received two bowl game bids in the eight seasons prior to Nutt's arrival.

Upon his arrival at Arkansas, Nutt invigorated the Razorback fan base with his enthusiasm and high energy. Under Nutt, the Razorbacks were one of three SEC schools to play in three New Year's Day bowls within five years. Nutt's teams were noted for a series of overtime games including the two longest overtime games in NCAA history. Off the field, some of Nutt's players were named to the SEC Academic Honor Roll 145 times and he established a reputation as a responsible coach academically. Nutt received some criticism for a SEC win–loss record that was just barely over .500 and because he called his own offensive plays during a game instead of relying on an offensive coordinator. In his first six seasons, Nutt led the team to a bowl game each year and averaged eight wins per season.

==== 1998 season ====
In his first season as head coach, Nutt's Razorbacks were picked to finish last in the Southeastern Conference Western Division in 1998, but ended up with a 9–3 record and a share of the division title. The Razorbacks lost to the eventual national champion Tennessee Volunteers on Tennessee's home field after quarterback Clint Stoerner fumbled while trying to run out the clock. For their efforts, the Razorbacks received their first-ever invitation to the Citrus Bowl and ended the season ranked No. 16 after losing to Michigan, led by junior quarterback Tom Brady. Nutt was selected as the Football News' National Coach of the Year.

==== 1999 season ====
In 1999, Nutt's Razorbacks were picked to win the SEC Western Division, but suffered a series of setbacks during the season. They recovered to defeat #4 ranked Tennessee, getting revenge for the loss in Knoxville the previous season due to Stoerner's fumble, and Mississippi State to earn a Cotton Bowl Classic bid versus arch-rival Texas. The Razorbacks defeated Texas 27–6, becoming the first team to ever hold Texas to negative rushing yards in a bowl game. It was Arkansas' first bowl victory since the 1985 Holiday Bowl. The Cotton Bowl victory, which was the first college football game played in the 21st Century, propelled Arkansas into the top 20 to end the season, finishing (8–4).

==== 2000 season ====
The 2000 season saw the Razorbacks lose the core of their team and suffer a string of injuries, including season-ending injuries to all of the starting running backs, and injuries to three of their quarterbacks. The Razorbacks struggled throughout the season until the final two games, when they defeated ranked Mississippi State and LSU teams to pull out another winning record and a Las Vegas Bowl appearance. Arkansas lost to UNLV in that game, finishing (6–6).

==== 2001 season ====
In the 2001 season, the Razorbacks started off with a revenge victory over UNLV, but then suffered three straight losses in conference play. They then came back to win six of the last seven, including victories over ranked South Carolina and Auburn teams. Based on this performance, the Razorbacks were selected to return to the Cotton Bowl Classic to face the defending national champion Oklahoma Sooners. Arkansas lost, gaining only 50 yards of total offense and just six first downs. Nutt was named SEC coach of the year by the Associated Press and by the SEC coaches. Arkansas finished (7–5).

==== 2002 season ====
In 2002, Nutt's Razorbacks (9–5) stumbled midway through the season but rallied to pull together five straight wins, including a last second touchdown pass against LSU, often referred to as the "Miracle on Markham" to pull out a share of a Western Division title. Arkansas was defeated by the Georgia Bulldogs in the SEC Championship Game and ended the season with a loss to Minnesota in the Music City Bowl.

==== 2003 season ====
In 2003, Nutt's team started off with a 4–0 record including a win against #5 Texas in Austin (Arkansas' first victory at Texas since 1988) and a double overtime win over Alabama, which happens to be the last time the Razorbacks have won in Tuscaloosa to date.

The early season success raised fan expectations sky-high and put Nutt under intense pressure when the Razorbacks lost their next three games, to include controversial losses to Auburn and Florida, putting them out of contention for the national championship or even the SEC Western Division crown. The Razorbacks won four of their final five games and defeated Missouri in the Independence Bowl to finish with a record of (9–4). After the 2003 season, Nebraska was rumored to be courting Nutt to be their head coach, after the firing of Frank Solich.

==== 2004 season ====
The 2004 and 2005 campaigns were widely expected to be rebuilding years due to young teams. The 2004 season ended with a 5–6 record and without a bowl invitation for the first time under Nutt.

==== 2005 season ====
The 2005 season was also a rebuilding year as expected. Tough losses to USC (70–17) as well as to Vanderbilt and South Carolina showed that the season had been predicted accurately, finishing with a 4–7 record. The team was ineligible for a bowl for the second season in a row (and the second season overall under coach Nutt). This led to Razorback fans calling for coaching changes. After meeting with Frank Broyles (athletic director) at the conclusion of the season, coaching changes were made by Nutt in the offseason at the risk of being fired, the most notable of which was the forced addition of Gus Malzahn, previously the head coach at Springdale High School in Springdale, Arkansas, as offensive coordinator. The hiring of Malzahn allowed Nutt to sign several highly recruited Springdale players, including Springdale High School quarterback Mitch Mustain and wide receiver Damian Williams, both of whom eventually transferred to USC.

==== 2006 season ====
The 2006 season began with a new offensive coordinator in Malzahn. The Razorbacks started the season losing 50–14 in a home game to USC. Following the loss to the Trojans, Nutt announced that Mustain would replace Robert Johnson as the Hogs' starting quarterback. Mustain led Arkansas to eight straight wins, including victories against No. 22 Alabama at home and No. 2 Auburn at Auburn, before losing the starting job to Casey Dick during the South Carolina game. Dick had been slotted to start at the beginning of the season but was unable to do so because of a back injury suffered in the spring. Dick led the Razorbacks to two victories out of four for a total of 10 wins, including a win over No. 13 Tennessee in Fayetteville when ESPN's College Gameday crew was in attendance. The Razorbacks moved to No. 7 in the BCS standings. However, the Hogs lost their last regular season game to the No. 8 LSU Tigers, 31–26. Despite the loss, the Hogs were still Western Division Champions of the SEC and played the 11–1 fourth-ranked Florida Gators for the SEC Championship. Florida won, 38–28. The Razorbacks then lost to the No. 5 Wisconsin Badgers on New Year's Day 2007 in the Capital One Bowl, finishing the season with a (10–4) record. It was Arkansas' first 10-win season since 1989. A highlight of the season was the second-place finish of sophomore tailback Darren McFadden in the Heisman Trophy voting. Nutt was named SEC coach of the year by the Associated Press and by the SEC coaches for the second time.

==== 2007 season ====
The 2007 season began with the Razorbacks ranked No. 21 by the AP Poll. The Hogs opened at home with a victory over Troy. However, early losses to Alabama and Kentucky knocked Arkansas out of the rankings and made the remaining SEC schedule an uphill struggle, even with Darren McFadden, Felix Jones, and Peyton Hillis in the Razorback backfield. Fan frustration boiled over, with some fans wearing all black T-shirts with anti-Nutt statements, radicals made death threats against the Nutt family, and one fan bought an entire page in a local Little Rock newspaper calling for Nutt to be fired. A non-official flyover was made hours before the Auburn home game with a small airplane towing a banner which read: "Fire Houston Nutt. Players and fans deserve better."

On November 23, 2007, in Baton Rouge, Nutt's Razorbacks beat the #1 football team in the nation. In a game that lasted three overtimes, Arkansas defeated eventual national champion LSU Tigers, 50–48, returning the Golden Boot back to Arkansas.

Darren McFadden would finish his career at Arkansas as the school's all-time leading rusher, was a consensus first team All-American, and finished runner-up in the Heisman voting for the second year in a row.

==== Resignation ====
Three days after defeating LSU, Nutt resigned as head coach of the Arkansas Razorbacks amid several controversies and rumors, which had come prior to and throughout the 2007 season. He left the school with a 75–48 record, which is second on the school's all-time win list, behind only Broyles. The 2007 team would go on to lose to Missouri in the 2008 Cotton Bowl Classic under interim head coach Reggie Herring, finishing (8–5).

=== Ole Miss ===
On November 27, 2007, Nutt was hired as the new head coach of the Ole Miss Rebels, replacing former head coach Ed Orgeron, who was fired after three consecutive losing seasons. Nutt's move to Ole Miss served to stoke the long-standing Arkansas–Ole Miss football rivalry.

It was announced on April 16, 2009, that Nutt and his wife, Diana, had committed to give a gift of $100,000 to Ole Miss, evenly divided between the university's indoor practice facility and the creation of student-athlete scholarships.

==== 2008 season ====
After a 41–24 victory over border rival Memphis to open the season, the Rebels suffered a loss to the then-ranked Wake Forest Demon Deacons, 30–28, on a last-second field goal. After defeating Samford, Ole Miss lost to the Vanderbilt Commodores at home. After the loss, the Rebels traveled to Ben Hill Griffin Stadium in Gainesville, Florida, where they defeated the #4-ranked, and eventual national champion, Florida Gators, 31–30, after blocking Florida's attempt at a tying extra point and a defensive stop of Florida quarterback Tim Tebow on 4th-and-1. The next weekend, the Rebels lost to South Carolina.

Next on the schedule was Alabama, ranked No. 2 in the nation at the time. During the game, Ole Miss became the first team Alabama trailed in the 2008 season. Alabama ultimately prevailed, however, in the final series of the game, winning, 24–20. Then came Arkansas. Nutt, facing his old team, came out victorious, 23–21. The Rebels followed that with a 17–7 home win against Auburn. On November 15, Ole Miss beat ULM, 59–0, to push their record to 6–4 and become bowl eligible for the first time since 2003. Ole Miss next beat No. 8 LSU, 31–13, in Baton Rouge, snapping a six-game losing streak to the Tigers, earning the Rebels an Associated Press ranking of No. 25, the first time in four years Ole Miss had been ranked, and putting them in position for a possible bid to the Cotton Bowl Classic in Dallas, Texas. The Rebels went on to beat SEC West and in-state rival Mississippi State, 45–0, in the Egg Bowl to finish the regular season at 8–4. The win over the Bulldogs moved the Rebels up to No. 22 in the AP Poll and landed the team their first ranking of the year in the Coaches' Poll, coming in at No. 25. Ole Miss defeated the No. 7 Texas Tech Red Raiders, 47–34, in the Cotton Bowl Classic.

==== 2009 season ====
The Ole Miss Rebels began the 2009 season rated highly by the media. After beating Memphis, 45–14, and Southeastern Louisiana, 52–6, which gave Ole Miss the second longest winning streak in the nation at eight games dating back to the 2008 season, Ole Miss climbed as high as No. 4 in the AP Poll before losing their 2009 SEC opener, 16–10, on the road at South Carolina in a Thursday night game on September 24. After the loss, Ole Miss fell 17 spots in the AP Poll, down to No. 21. Ole Miss went on the road again and beat Vanderbilt the next week, 23–7. After a disappointing start and pair of conference losses, they managed to rebound against Arkansas, winning 30–17. Ole Miss went on to beat No. 8 LSU, 25–23, at Oxford. Ole Miss lost to in-state and SEC rival Mississippi State on November 28 in the Egg Bowl at Starkville, 41–27. Ole Miss was picked to play in the Cotton Bowl Classic for the second year in a row, where they defeated Oklahoma State, 21–7, to end the season.

===== The Houston Nutt Rule =====
Nutt recruited 37 players in February 2010, leading the SEC to enact the Houston Nutt Rule: effective August 1, 2010, "SEC teams will be limited to signing 28 football recruits, with the usual maximum of 25 allowed to enroll in the fall."

ESPN recruiting analyst Tom Luginbill said:

Ole Miss was trying to create a farm league. I think what the cap does is make you have to make tougher choices. Before you could say, We can get all three of these guys. Now you say, We can fit one in and which one do we want?"

==== 2010 season ====
The Ole Miss Rebels finished 4–8 overall in the 2010 season, including 1–7 in the Southeastern Conference. Among the worst of these losses was to FCS-member Jacksonville State, which was Ole Miss' first loss to a lower division team since 1945. In an ironic twist, the head coach of Jacksonville State at the time was Jack Crowe, who was fired by athletic director Frank Broyles one game into the 1992 season as head coach at Arkansas, after a season-opening loss to FCS-member The Citadel. Houston Nutt was an assistant on Crowe's staff at that time. Nutt and Ole Miss lost to Arkansas this season, 38–24, and many Razorback fans jeered Nutt after the game.

All four victories were vacated in 2019 as punishment for recruiting violations committed by members of Nutt's staff, leaving the team officially winless. It was Ole Miss' first winless record in modern times.

==== 2011 season ====
Nutt set an Ole Miss coaching record with his 12th straight Southeastern Conference loss. On November 7, 2011, Nutt was fired by the University of Mississippi, but was allowed to coach through the end of the season. His final game was a 31–3 loss to Mississippi State in the annual Egg Bowl. Nutt also lost for the second straight year to his former team, the University of Arkansas, as the Razorbacks held on for a 29–24 victory in Oxford. Ole Miss finished winless in conference play.

Two wins in non-conference play were vacated in 2019 as punishment for recruiting violations committed by members of Nutt's staff, leaving the team officially winless.

== Allegations of misconduct in recruiting ==
In January 2016, the NCAA notified Nutt's former university, Mississippi, of 13 compliance violations alleged to have occurred under both Nutt and then-head coach Hugh Freeze. Nutt was alleged to have cheated by allowing ineligible students to play in Ole Miss games in 2011 and 2012. However, Nutt filed suit against Ole Miss, and the suit was later settled with the university and Nutt issuing this official statement:

"Certain statements made by University employees in January 2016 appear to have contributed to misleading media reports about Coach Nutt. To the extent any such statements harmed Coach Nutt’s reputation, the University apologizes, as this was not the intent. The NCAA’s Notice of Allegations dated January 22, 2016, did not name or implicate Coach Nutt in any misconduct, and it would have been inappropriate for any University employee to suggest otherwise."

Apparently, two assistants under Nutt had conspired to fix certain players' ACT scores to make them eligible to play and those assistants under Nutt were found guilty of academic fraud. These were the only two violations which occurred under Nutt's administration; of the 21 total NCAA findings, the remaining 19 violations were under Freeze's administration.

== Head coaching record ==
Year	Team	Overall	Conference	Standing	Bowl/playoffs	Coaches^{#}	AP^{°}
Murray State Racers (Ohio Valley Conference) (1993–1996)
1993	Murray State	4–7	4–4	4th			
1994	Murray State	5–6	4–4	4th			
1995	Murray State	11–1	8–0	1st	L NCAA Division I-AA First Round		
1996	Murray State	11–2	8–0	1st	L NCAA Division I-AA Quarterfinal		
Murray State:		31–16	24–8				
Boise State Broncos (Big West Conference) (1997)
1997	Boise State	5–6 (Note: Cal State Northridge's 63–23 win over Boise State on August 30 was forfeited for infractions.)	3–2	3rd			
Boise State:		5–6	3–2				
Arkansas Razorbacks (Southeastern Conference) (1998–2007)
1998	Arkansas	9–3	6–2	T–1st (Western)	L Florida Citrus	17	16
1999	Arkansas	8–4	4–4	3rd (Western)	W Cotton	19	17
2000	Arkansas	6–6	3–5	T–5th (Western)	L Las Vegas		
2001	Arkansas	7–5	4–4	3rd (Western)	L Cotton		
2002	Arkansas	9–5	5–3	T–2nd (Western) (Note: In 2002, Alabama finished first in Western Division of the Southeastern Conference (SEC) with a conference record of 6–2, but was ineligible for the division title or postseason play as part of a penalty for National Collegiate Athletic Association (NCAA) violations. Arkansas, Auburn, and LSU tied for second place, each with a 5–3 mark in the conference, and were named co-champions. Arkansas was awarded a berth in the SEC Championship Game by virtue of their head-to-head wins over Auburn and LSU.)	L Music City		
2003	Arkansas	9–4	4–4	4th (Western)	W Independence		
2004	Arkansas	5–6	3–5	3rd (Western)			
2005	Arkansas	4–7	2–6	4th (Western)			
2006	Arkansas	10–4	7–1	1st (Western)	L Capital One	16	15
2007	Arkansas	8–4 (Note: Nutt resigned after the regular season. Reggie Herring coached Arkansas in the Cotton Bowl.)	4–4	3rd (Western)	Cotton		
Arkansas:		75–48	42–38				
Ole Miss Rebels (Southeastern Conference) (2008–2011)
2008	Ole Miss	9–4	5–3	2nd (Western)	W Cotton	15	14
2009	Ole Miss	9–4	4–4	3rd (Western)	W Cotton	21	20
2010	Ole Miss	4–8	1–7	6th (Western)			
2011	Ole Miss	2–10	0–8	6th (Western)			
Ole Miss:		24–26	10–22				
Total:		131–96					
National championship Conference title Conference division title or championship game berth
^{#}Rankings from final Coaches Poll.; ^{°}Rankings from final AP Poll.
