= Dennis Nutt =

American basketball player and coach (born 1963)

Ouachita Baptist Tigers
- Title: Head coach
- League: Great American Conference

Personal information
- Born: March 25, 1963 (age 63) Little Rock, Arkansas, U.S.
- Listed height: 6 ft 2 in (1.88 m)
- Listed weight: 170 lb (77 kg)

Career information
- High school: Little Rock Central (Little Rock, Arkansas)
- College: TCU (1981–1985)
- NBA draft: 1985: undrafted
- Playing career: 1985–1991
- Position: Point guard
- Number: 21

Career history

Playing
- 1985–1987: La Crosse Catbirds
- 1987: Dallas Mavericks
- 1987–1988: La Crosse Catbirds
- 1988–1989: Sioux Falls Skyforce
- 1989–1990: Real Madrid
- 1990–1991: Sioux Falls Skyforce

Coaching
- 2000–2006: Texas State
- 2011–present: Ouachita Baptist

Career highlights
- First-team All-SWC (1985)
- Stats at NBA.com
- Stats at Basketball Reference

Dennis Clay Nutt (born March 25, 1963) is a retired American professional basketball player. He is the head basketball coach at Ouachita Baptist University in Arkadelphia, Arkansas.

== Career ==
Nutt was a 6-foot-2-inch (188 cm) and 170 pounds (77 kg) guard and played collegiately at Texas Christian University from 1981–85. He is now the head basketball coach at Ouachita Baptist University in Arkadelphia, Arkansas. He has worked as a scout for the NBA's Charlotte Bobcats. Previously, Nutt was an assistant coach for Coastal Carolina University men's basketball team, and was the head coach at Texas State University for six years.

Nutt played in the CBA with the La Crosse Catbirds and the Sioux Falls Skyforce. He played 25 games with the NBA's Dallas Mavericks in the 1986–87 National Basketball Association season then signed with Milwaukee Bucks in 1989 and the Sacramento Kings in 1990. Following his NBA career, he played for Real Madrid in Spain for one year for the season 1989–90.

Dennis Nutt is the brother of Dickey Nutt, former head men's basketball coach at Southeast Missouri State University and Arkansas State University. Dennis Nutt served as an assistant at Arkansas State under Dickey Nutt for five years until April 2000. They are also the brothers of Houston Nutt, who is the former head football coach of the University of Mississippi and the University of Arkansas, and Danny Nutt, a former running backs coach for the Arkansas Razorbacks football team.

== Career statistics ==
Legend
GP	Games played	GS	Games started	MPG	Minutes per game
FG%	Field goal percentage	3P%	3-point field goal percentage	FT%	Free throw percentage
RPG	Rebounds per game	APG	Assists per game	SPG	Steals per game
BPG	Blocks per game	PPG	Points per game	**Bold**	Career high

=== NBA ===
==== Regular season ====
Year	Team	GP	GS	MPG	FG%	3P%	FT%	RPG	APG	SPG	BPG	PPG
1986–87	Dallas	25	0	3.6	.400	.294	.909	.3	.6	.3	.0	2.3

==== Playoffs ====
Year	Team	GP	GS	MPG	FG%	3P%	FT%	RPG	APG	SPG	BPG	PPG
1987	Dallas	1	0	10.0	.200	.000	–	2.0	1.0	.0	.0	2.0
