= Deterrian Shackelford =

American football linebacker

No. 38
- Position: Middle linebacker

Personal information
- Born: February 26, 1991 (age 35); Decatur, Alabama, U.S.
- Listed height: 6 ft 1 in (1.85 m)
- Listed weight: 220 lb (100 kg)

Career information
- High school: Austin High School (Decatur)
- College: Ole Miss (2009–2015)

Awards and highlights
- Wuerffel Trophy (2014)
- Stats at ESPN

Deterrian "DT" Shackelford is an American former football linebacker who played college football for Ole Miss.

== Early life ==
Deterrian Shackelford was born on February 26, 1991 in Decatur, Alabama. He attented Austin High School in Decatur, where he played as a linebacker.
