= 2000 Las Vegas Bowl =

- 9th Las Vegas Bowl
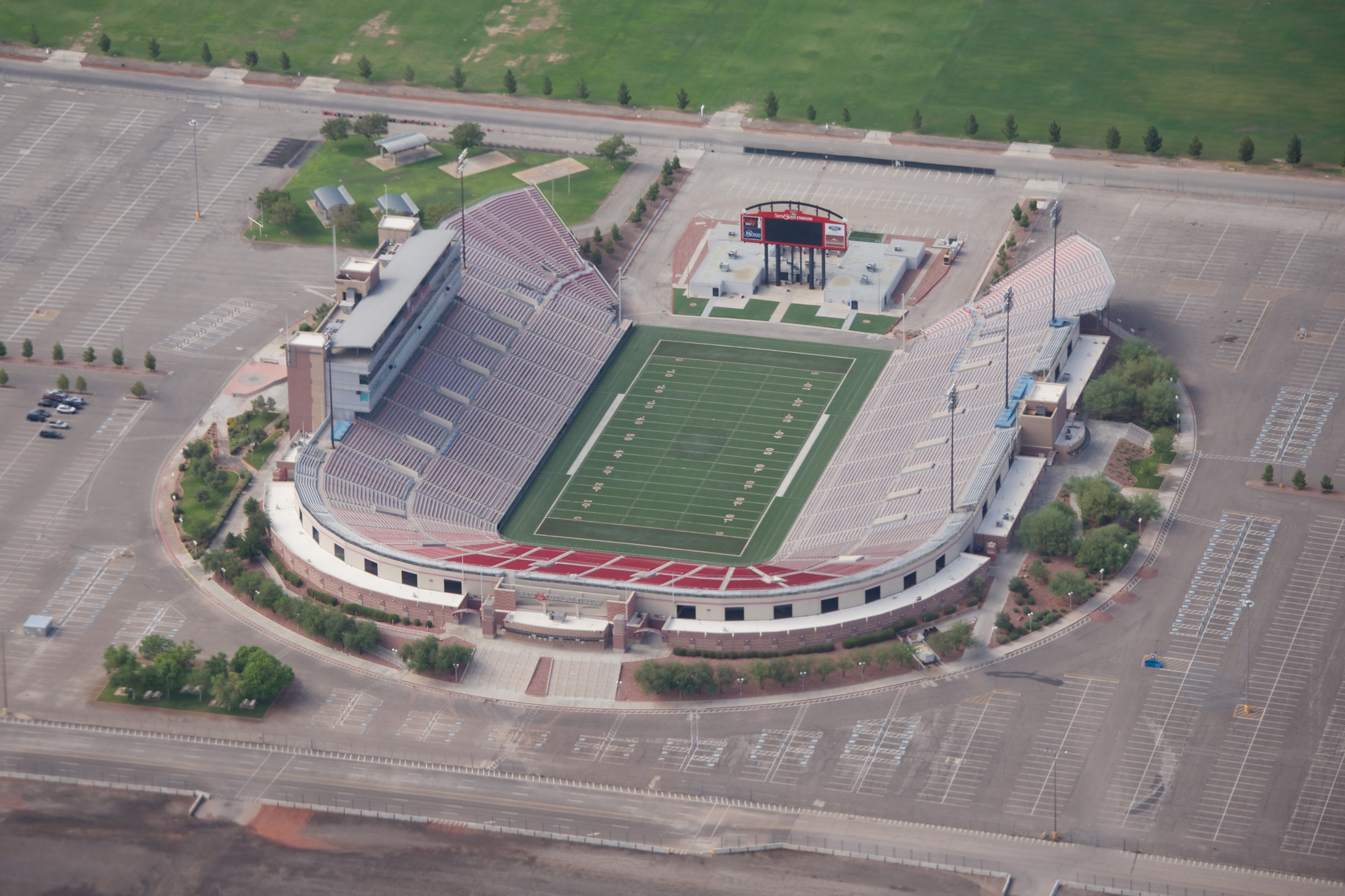
- Sam Boyd Stadium in Whitney, Nevada, hosted the Las Vegas Bowl.
Arkansas Razorbacks	UNLV Rebels
(6–5)	(7–5)
SEC	Mountain West
14	31
Head coach: Houston Nutt	Head coach: John Robinson
	1	2	3	4	Total
Arkansas	7	7	0	0	14
UNLV	0	14	7	10	31
- Date: December 21, 2000
- Season: 2000
- Stadium: Sam Boyd Stadium
- Location: Whitney, Nevada
- Referee: Gordon Riese (Pac-10)
- Payout: US$800,000 per team

United States TV coverage
- Network: ESPN2
- Announcers: Steve Levy, Todd Christensen, and Heather Cox

The 2000 Las Vegas Bowl was the ninth edition of the annual college football bowl game. It featured the Arkansas Razorbacks and the hometown UNLV Rebels.

== Game summary ==
Arkansas scored first on a 7-yard touchdown pass from quarterback Robby Hampton to wide receiver Rod Stinson for a 7-0 Razorback lead. In the second quarter, UNLV tied the score at 7, following a 19-yard touchdown pass from Jason Thomas to Nate Turner. Arkansas answered with a 25-yard touchdown pass from Hampton to Boo Williams, giving the Razorbacks a 14–7 lead. But with Thomas and Turner connecting for their second score, the game became a 14–14 tie at intermission.

In the third quarter, Jason Thomas notched his third passing touchdown of the game, a 54 yarder to Troy Mason, giving UNLV a 21–14 lead it wouldn't relinquish. In the fourth quarter, Dillon Pieffer kicked a 26-yard field goal to increase the Rebels lead to 24–14. Kevin Brown's 14 yard touchdown run made the final margin 31–14.
