= Alexander Bondurant =

American classicist, educator and football coach

Biographical details
- Born: June 22, 1865; Buckingham County, Virginia, U.S.
- Died: January 12, 1937 (aged 71); Oxford, Mississippi, U.S.

Coaching career (HC unless noted)
- 1893: Ole Miss

Head coaching record
- Overall: 4–1

Alexander Lee Bondurant (June 22, 1865 – January 12, 1937) was an American classicist, educator and football coach. Born in Buckingham County, Virginia, he was educated at Hampden–Sydney College (A.B. and A.M.) and the University of Virginia, followed by further study at the University of Texas and Harvard University, and in Europe, where he studied Greek and Roman ruins. In 1889 he began his career as an instructor of Greek and Latin at the University of Mississippi, becoming head of the classics department in 1894, and the first dean of the graduate school in 1927, retiring as dean emeritus in 1936. He also served as the first football coach at the university in 1893. During his one-season tenure, Bondurant compiled a record of four wins and one loss (4–1).

== Head coaching record ==
Year	Team	Overall	Conference	Standing	Bowl/playoffs
Ole Miss Rebels (Independent) (1893)
1893	Ole Miss	4–1			
Ole Miss:		4–1			
Total:		4–1			
