= Realtree Outdoors =

- Country of origin: United States

Original release
- Network: TNN (1993–2003); Spike TV (2003); ESPN2 (2004–2010); Outdoor Channel (2011–present)
- Release: 1993 – present

Realtree Outdoors, known in full as Bill Jordan's Realtree Outdoors, is an outdoors hunting show in the United States. The series debuted in 1993 and has become the top-rated, longest-running hunting show on TV. The show now runs on the Outdoor Channel, with new episodes airing weekly. It is hosted by Bill Jordan, the creator of Realtree camouflage brand, headquartered in Columbus, Georgia. The show also features co-host David Blanton, who has served as executive producer of Realtree Outdoors since the show premiered in 1993.

Realtree Outdoors first aired on TNN in 1993. It gained popularity and moved to ESPN2 in 2004. The TV show transitioned to the Outdoor Channel in 2011.
