= 2010 Cotton Bowl Classic =

2010 AT&T Cotton Bowl Classic
- 74th Cotton Bowl Classic
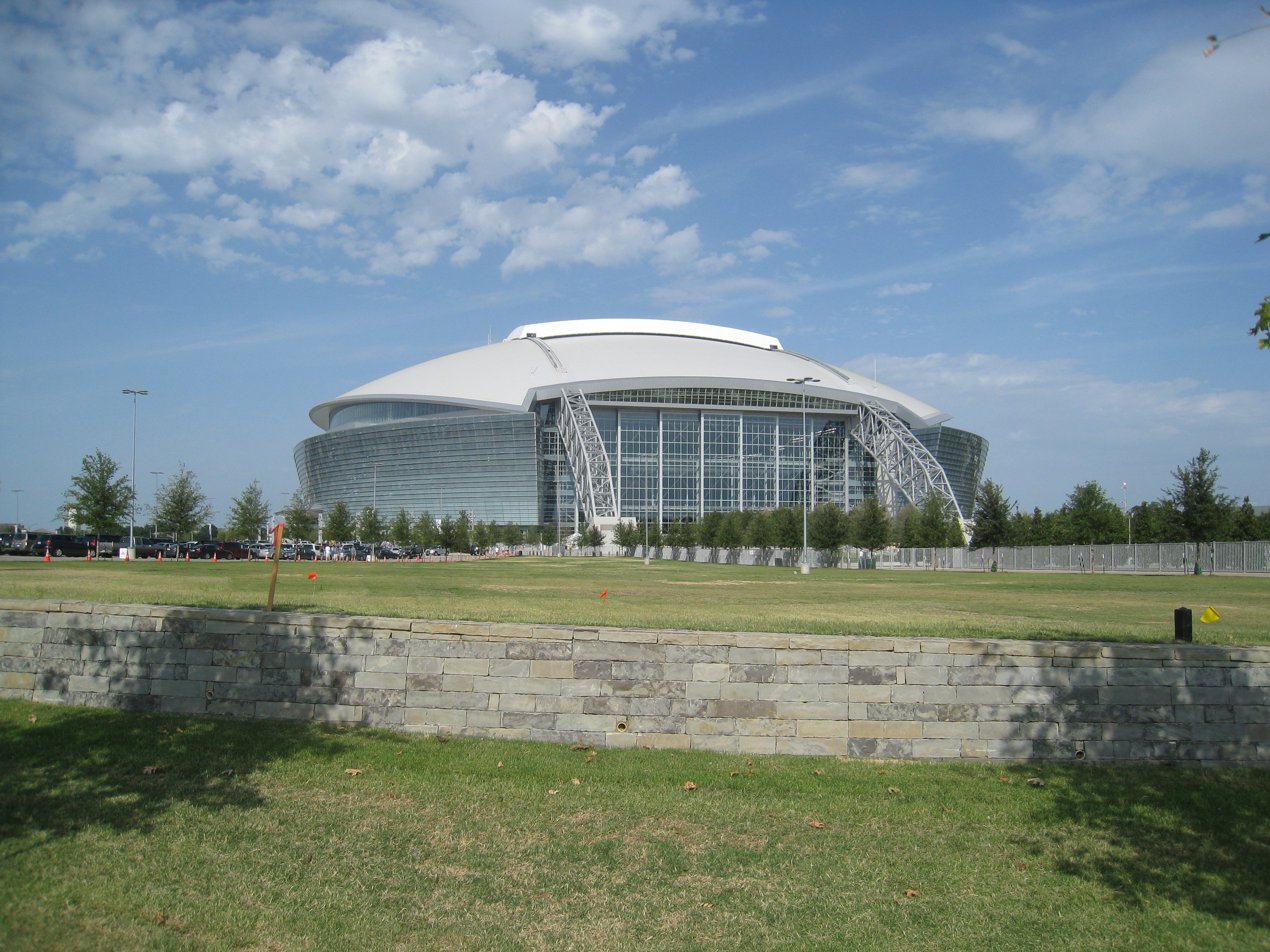
- Cowboys Stadium in Arlington, Texas, hosted the Cotton Bowl Classic.
Oklahoma State Cowboys	Ole Miss Rebels
(9–3)	(8–4)
Big 12	SEC
7	21
Head coach: Mike Gundy	Head coach: Houston Nutt
AP / Coaches / BCS; 21 / 18 / 19
	1	2	3	4	Total
Oklahoma State	0	0	7	0	7
Ole Miss	0	7	0	14	21
- Date: January 2, 2010
- Season: 2009
- Stadium: Cowboys Stadium
- Location: Arlington, Texas
- MVP: RB Dexter McCluster (Ole Miss); LB Andre Sexton (Oklahoma State)
- Referee: Jack Childress (Atlantic Coast Conference)
- Attendance: 77,928
- Payout: US$6.75 Million

United States TV coverage
- Network: Fox
- Announcers: Pat Summerall - (play-by-play); Daryl Johnston - (analyst); Krista Voda - (host); Shepard Smith - (sideline reporter)
- Nielsen ratings: 4.5

The 2010 AT&T Cotton Bowl Classic game was a post-season college football bowl game between the Oklahoma State Cowboys, representing Oklahoma State University, from the Big 12 Conference and the Ole Miss Rebels, representing the University of Mississippi, from the Southeastern Conference that took place on Saturday, January 2, 2010, at Cowboys Stadium in Arlington, Texas. The 2010 game was the first game in Cowboys Stadium after leaving its namesake venue and was the concluding game of the season for both teams involved.

Ole Miss has the distinction of playing in the last Cotton Bowl Classic held in the old Cotton Bowl stadium and playing in the first ever Cotton Bowl Classic held in its new home at Cowboys Stadium.

This was Ole Miss' second consecutive Cotton Bowl Classic appearance as the Rebels also played in the 2009 Cotton Bowl Classic where they defeated Texas Tech 47–34.

This was also the second meeting between Ole Miss and Oklahoma State in a Cotton Bowl Classic game. The two teams met in the 2004 Cotton Bowl Classic, which Ole Miss won 31-28 on the arm of quarterback Eli Manning.

This was Oklahoma State's third appearance in the Cotton Bowl Classic. Their first was a 34–0 win over TCU in 1945. This was Ole Miss' fifth appearance in the Cotton Bowl Classic. Aside from the 2004 and 2009 games, Ole Miss defeated TCU 14–13 in 1956 and lost to Texas 7–12 in 1962.

In this 2010 edition of the Cotton Bowl Classic, Ole Miss defeated Oklahoma State by a score of 21–7. With the win, Ole Miss became the first team to win back-to-back Cotton Bowl Classics since Notre Dame did so in 1993 and 1994. Ole Miss' Dexter McCluster was awarded the offensive MVP, making him only the second back-to-back offensive MVP in the Cotton Bowl Classic's 74-year history. The other was SMU's Doak Walker in 1948 and 1949. McCluster's 86-yard run for a touchdown was the longest actual completed run in Cotton Bowl Classic history but is not the longest officially. In the 1954 Cotton Bowl Classic, Rice University's Dicky Moegle began a run from his team's 5-yard line down the sideline near the University of Alabama's bench. As Moegle passed Alabama's bench, Alabama player Tommy Lewis jumped off the bench, wearing no helmet, and tackled Moegle at the 42-yard line. The referee saw what happened and signaled touchdown therefore making it officially a 95-yard run for a touchdown. This was also the last football game of any sort that Pat Summerall did play-by-play for.

== Game summary ==
=== Scoring summary ===
Scoring Play	Score
2nd Quarter
MISS - Dexter McCluster rush for 86 yards for a TOUCHDOWN, Joshua Shene extra point GOOD, 11:19	MISS 7–0
3rd Quarter
OKST - Keith Toston pass complete to Wilson Youman for 1 yard for a TOUCHDOWN, Dan Bailey extra point GOOD, 7:13	TIE 7–7
4th Quarter
MISS - Dexter McCluster rush for 2 yards for a TOUCHDOWN, Joshua Shene extra point GOOD, 4:03	MISS 14–7
MISS - Patrick Trahan fumble recovery returned 34 yards for a TOUCHDOWN, Joshua Shene extra point GOOD, 3:12	MISS 21–7
