= History of Arkansas Razorbacks football =

American football team history

This page covers the history of Arkansas Razorbacks football.

== Overview ==
=== Early history (1894–1957) ===
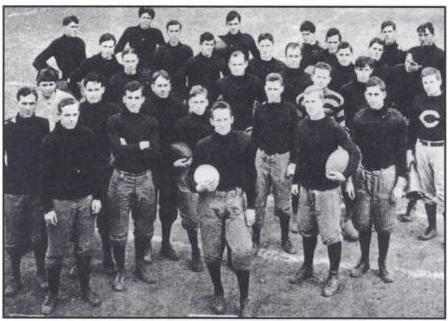
The undefeated 1909 Arkansas Cardinals. QB Steve Creekmore is in front with Coach Hugo Bezdek at right (with the C sweatshirt).

The first University of Arkansas football team was formed in 1894 and coached by John Futrall, who was a Latin professor at the university. That team played three games: two against Fort Smith High School and one against Texas. Before the 1909 season, the teams were called the Arkansas Cardinals and a bird was the school's mascot. The name and mascot changed following the 1909 season when the football team, coached by Hugo Bezdek, finished 7–0. The Cardinals became the Razorbacks after Arkansas defeated LSU 7–0, and coach Bezdek told a group of reporters after the game that his team played like a "wild band of Razorback hogs". The name stuck, and the student body voted to change the mascot. The "Wooo Pig Sooie" or "Calling The Hogs" became a tradition and the official school cheer in the 1920s when farmers rushing out to meet the bus returning from an away game called the hogs as a greeting. Arkansas prevailed over powerhouses Oklahoma, LSU and Washington University in St. Louis in 1909, and was declared unofficial champions of the South and Southwest. It was with the help of Steve Creekmore that this was accomplished. Creekmore became perhaps the first Razorback star, a quarterback from Van Buren who initially played only intramurals. Bezdek used Creekmore to install a very early edition of the hurry-up offense, as the team never huddled and chased the ball after every play. Creekmore was also known for "fast and slippery running, blocking, and passing" and could also return punts and tackle well.

There are differing stories about the origins of the 'Razorbacks' mascot, however. The Texarkana Arkansas High School mascot and athletic emblem is the Razorback with red and white serving as the school colors. The Razorback mascot was selected in 1910 to replace the Cardinal as the University of Arkansas mascot. In exchange for its use, the university provided used athletic gear to Texarkana Arkansas High; this practice is no longer used. With the new name and mascot, the Hogs defeated LSU 51–0 and gave Texas A&M their only loss in 1910, but fell short of another perfect season, losing 5–0 to Kansas State. In 1913, Arkansas quarterback J. L. Carter and the Razorbacks lost to Ole Miss, and took a fateful train to Arkadelphia to play Ouachita Baptist. While Carter was eating, he was invited to a meeting of Ouachita boosters. He transferred (which took place immediately, this being permissible at the time) and defeated Arkansas 15–9 in 1914. The Hogs would be contacted by L. Theo Bellmont in 1913 in his attempt to create an intercollegiate conference to regulate use of ringers. Hugo Bezdek, since replaced by E. T. Pickering, had recommended that the Hogs join a conference before he left to coach at Oregon.

The Razorbacks joined the Southwest Conference (SWC) as charter members in 1915. The conference also included teams from Texas (Baylor, Rice, Texas, Texas A&M) and Oklahoma (Oklahoma, Oklahoma A&M). Southwestern (TX) would also join, but leave the following year. The 1916, 1917, and 1919 teams were led at quarterback by "Arkansas' greatest athlete" Gene Davidson. The Razorbacks didn't have a winning conference record until 1920, and didn't win the conference championship until 1936. Arkansas had the best record during the 1933 season, but had to forfeit the SWC Championship because Ulysses "Heine" Schleuter, who had no eligibility remaining, played on the team. Schleuter had told coach Fred Thomsen that he was eligible, but he was recognized by an SMU player during the game as a former Cornhusker. The Hogs did accept an invitation to the 1934 Dixie Classic, a precursor to today's Cotton Bowl Classic. Arkansas became rivals with Ole Miss due to proximity. Although not SWC members, Ole Miss played Arkansas intermittently until a yearly series began from 1952–1961. During the 1938 season, the Razorbacks replaced their 300-seat stadium known as The Hill with Bailey Stadium, named after Arkansas governor Carl Bailey. It was known as University Stadium for one game before being changed to honor the governor. This stadium still exists today, although heavily renovated, as Donald W. Reynolds Razorback Stadium, the current home of the Razorbacks.

Arkansas won the conference championship in 1946, earning a bid in the 1947 Cotton Bowl Classic with LSU. The game would become known as the Ice Bowl, as a winter storm hit Dallas before the game. The two rivals battled to a scoreless tie, with Razorback great Clyde Scott tackling an LSU Tiger at the one yard-line to preserve the tie on the second-to-last play of the game. LSU would fail to complete the field goal attempt on the next play. The Razorbacks defeated William & Mary the next year in the 1948 Dixie Bowl. In 1954, the Ole Miss rivalry would catch fire. The Hogs played the Rebels in War Memorial Stadium on October 23, 1954. The Rebels were ranked No. 5 by the AP Poll entering the game, and Arkansas was picked to finish last in the SWC. The contest would be decided by a 66-yard halfback pass from tailback Buddy Bob Benson to blocking back Preston Carpenter, the only score of the game. This is referred to as the Powder River Play, and "perhaps the most important in Arkansas football history to that time" by Orville Henry, a member of the 1954 team. The Hogs would get back to the Cotton Bowl Classic in 1954, only to be defeated by Georgia Tech. Future Arkansas head coach Frank Broyles was an assistant under Yellowjackets head coach Bobby Dodd in the game. The 1954 season was all the more impressive when it is considered that the team only had twenty-five players on the squad. That team, dubbed the "25 Little Pigs" and coached by Bowden Wyatt, finished 8-3 and won the Southwest Conference championship. During this period, Arkansas developed rivalries with Texas and Texas A&M because of their intense conference match-ups.

=== Frank Broyles era (1958–1976) ===
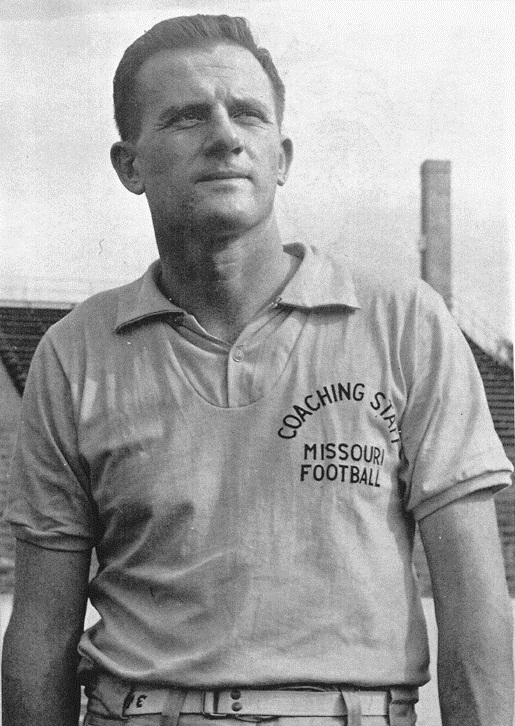
Broyles as Missouri Tigers head coach in 1957

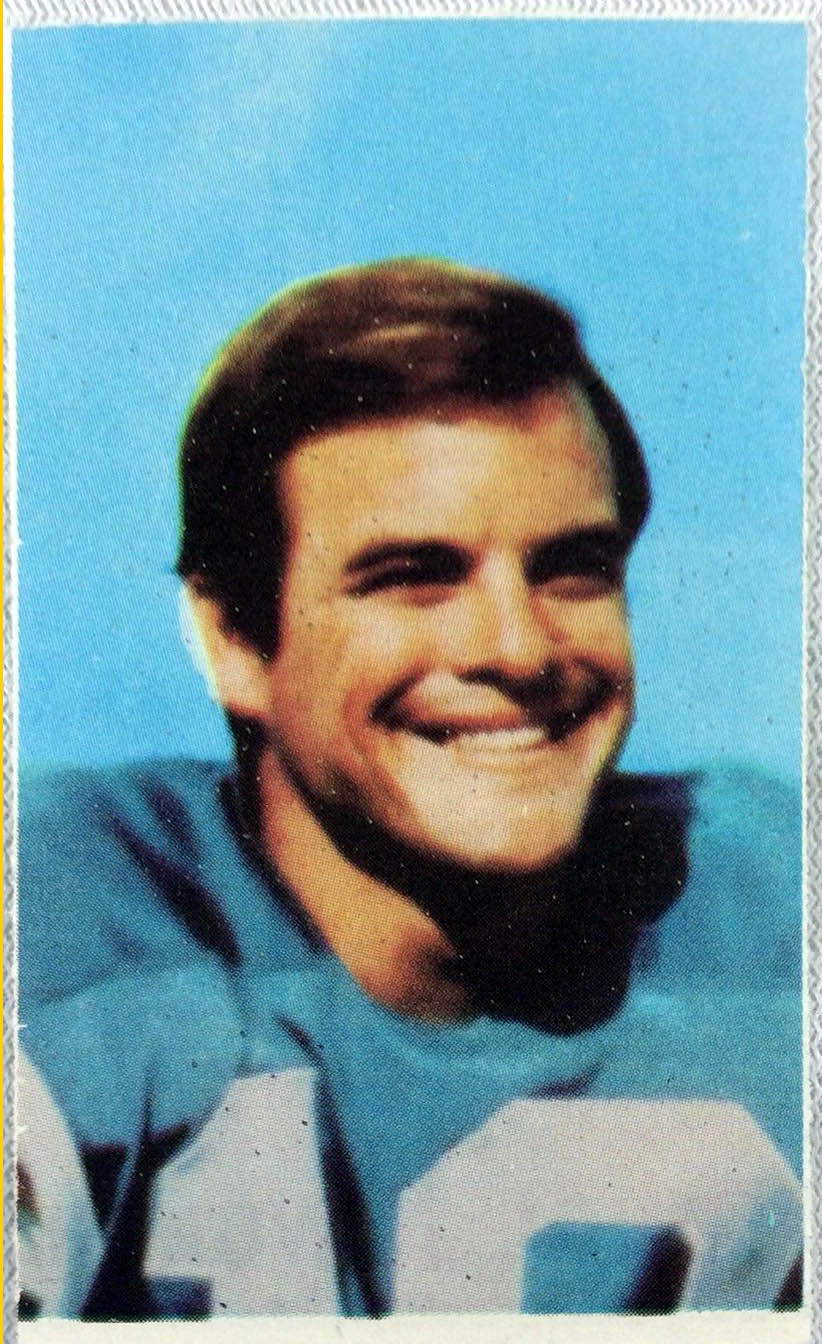
Lance Alworth (1959–61), Hall of Fame WR

Missouri head coach Frank Broyles was hired as the Razorbacks head football coach in 1957 and served in that position for 19 years. Arkansas would grow into a national power with Broyles at the helm, including several conference championships and a national title. Arkansas would earn a share of the 1959 SWC Championship, splitting with Texas. Arkansas lost only to No. 3 Texas and No. 6 Ole Miss during the season. The Hogs went to Jacksonville and defeated Georgia Tech in the 1960 Gator Bowl 14–7, avenging an earlier Cotton Bowl Classic defeat. Barry Switzer was a co-captain on the team. Some, including University Chancellor and student during 1958, John White, view the Razorback football team during this period as a revival of Arkansas, which was recovering from the Little Rock Nine and racial segregation problems.

The 1960s was the best decade in Arkansas football history. 1960 brought another SWC crown, and a Cotton Bowl Classic invitation for the Hogs, who were ranked as high as 7th during the season. The Razorbacks lost to No. 2 Ole Miss and No. 20 Baylor, but defeated No. 11 Texas in Austin, bringing the championship to Fayetteville. The Hogs lost to Duke, 7–6, because of a blocked extra point. The following season brought another shared SWC championship with Texas. The Hogs were defeated by the Longhorns 33–7, as well as the No. 9 Ole Miss Rebels, warranting an invitation to New Orleans, Louisiana, for the Sugar Bowl. No. 1 Alabama defeated the Razorbacks 10–3. The Crimson Tide had been declared national champions before the game, which was the procedure at the time. The Hogs would fight this system in 1964, when the same Alabama team would claim the 1964 AP crown before losing the Orange Bowl to the Texas Longhorns, a team Arkansas defeated in Austin, Texas, during the regular season. Arkansas won the Cotton Bowl Classic over Nebraska, 10–7.

Broyles' team was awarded the 1964 National Championship by the Football Writers Association of America and the Helms Athletic Foundation. The FWAA and HAF awarded their national championships to Arkansas, who was the only team to go undefeated through the bowl games that year. At the time, the Associated Press (AP) and UPI awarded their national titles before the bowl games, and gave their trophies to the Alabama team that would lose in the Orange Bowl game a few days later. The next season, 1965, the Razorbacks were 10–0 in the regular season, and were once again the Southwest Conference Champions. That sent the Razorbacks back to the Cotton Bowl Classic on New Year's Day, this time to play against LSU. Because of the controversy in determining the national champions in 1964, the AP poll would wait until after the bowl games to announce its champion. With top-ranked Michigan State losing in the Rose Bowl, the No. 2 Razorbacks had a chance to become national champions, but were defeated 14–7 by the Tigers.

Arkansas would return to the field in 1966 ranked fifth, but losses against unranked Baylor and Texas Tech would prevent the 8–2 Hogs from playing in a bowl game. Loyd Phillips was a consensus All-American defensive tackle on the team. Phillips also took home the Outland Trophy. After struggling to a 4–5–1 record in 1967, the Hogs went 10–1 and returned to the postseason in 1968. No. 9 Arkansas defeated No. 2 Georgia in the Sugar Bowl, 16–2. Sophomore receiver Chuck Dicus scored the only touchdown of the game for the Razorbacks. In 1969, the Razorbacks had another chance to claim the national title, when No. 2 Arkansas played the No. 1 Texas Longhorns, coached by Darrell Royal, at Razorback Stadium in Fayetteville, Arkansas. The game, known as "The Big Shootout" or the Game of the Century, is perhaps the most notable football game in Razorbacks history. Arkansas led 14–0 at after three quarters, but Texas stormed back and took a 15–14 lead on a two-point conversion, after a questionable passing play was called late in the game by then coach Frank Broyles, which was intercepted by Texas. President Richard Nixon was in attendance, and proclaimed Texas the national champions, even though they had a bowl game to play, and Penn State was also undefeated. Arkansas lost to Ole Miss in the Sugar Bowl, 27–22, and Texas beat Notre Dame in the Cotton Bowl Classic for the national title.

The 1970s brought more success for Broyles, led by Razorback standouts Chuck Dicus and Ben Cowins. The 1970 Razorbacks would go 9–2, with the nine consecutive wins bookended by losses in the opener to No. 10 Stanford and the finale to No. 1 Texas. The 1971 Razorbacks went 8–3–1, including upset wins over No. 7 Cal and No. 10 Texas. They were invited to the Liberty Bowl, but lost to No. 9 Tennessee 14–13. The 1972–1974 seasons would be mediocre, as Arkansas struggled to defeat the Texas teams. The Hogs went 11–8–2 against schools in Texas, but failed to beat the University of Texas during the span. The highlight of the period was an upset of No. 5 USC in War Memorial Stadium in 1974. Broyles would win his seventh and final Southwest Conference championship in 1975. The contest with Texas A&M was moved until the end of the year, as it was expected to decide the Southwest Conference championship. The Razorbacks did not disappoint, as Arkansas defeated No. 2 Texas A&M, 31–6, in War Memorial Stadium. The win forced the Aggies to share the conference championship with Texas and Arkansas. However, the tie-breaker went to Arkansas, thus Arkansas received the invitation to the Cotton Bowl Classic. The Cotton Bowl Classic berth would also be Broyles' last appearance. Arkansas would fall behind Georgia early on in that game, but came roaring back to beat the Bulldogs easily, 31–10. Arkansas finished with a 10–2 record and finished ranked No. 7 in the AP and No. 6 in the UPI that season. Broyles coached the Razorbacks in 1976, but with limited success, compiling a 5–5–1 record. Broyles retired as Arkansas head coach following the 1976 season, but served as the university's athletics director until December 31, 2007. He is now arguably one of the best college football coaches to coach Arkansas.

=== Lou Holtz era (1977–1983) ===
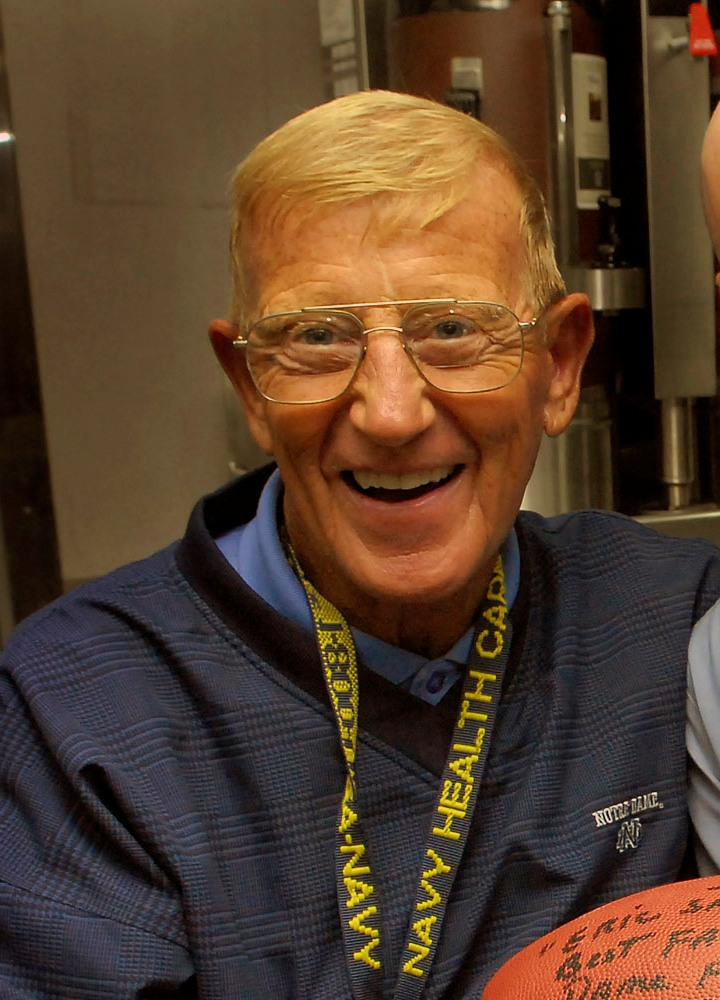
Coach Holtz was elected to the College Football Hall of Fame on May 1, 2008.

After Broyles left coaching and became athletic director at Arkansas, he hired New York Jets head coach Lou Holtz to take his former position. Holtz served as head football coach from 1977 through the 1983 season.

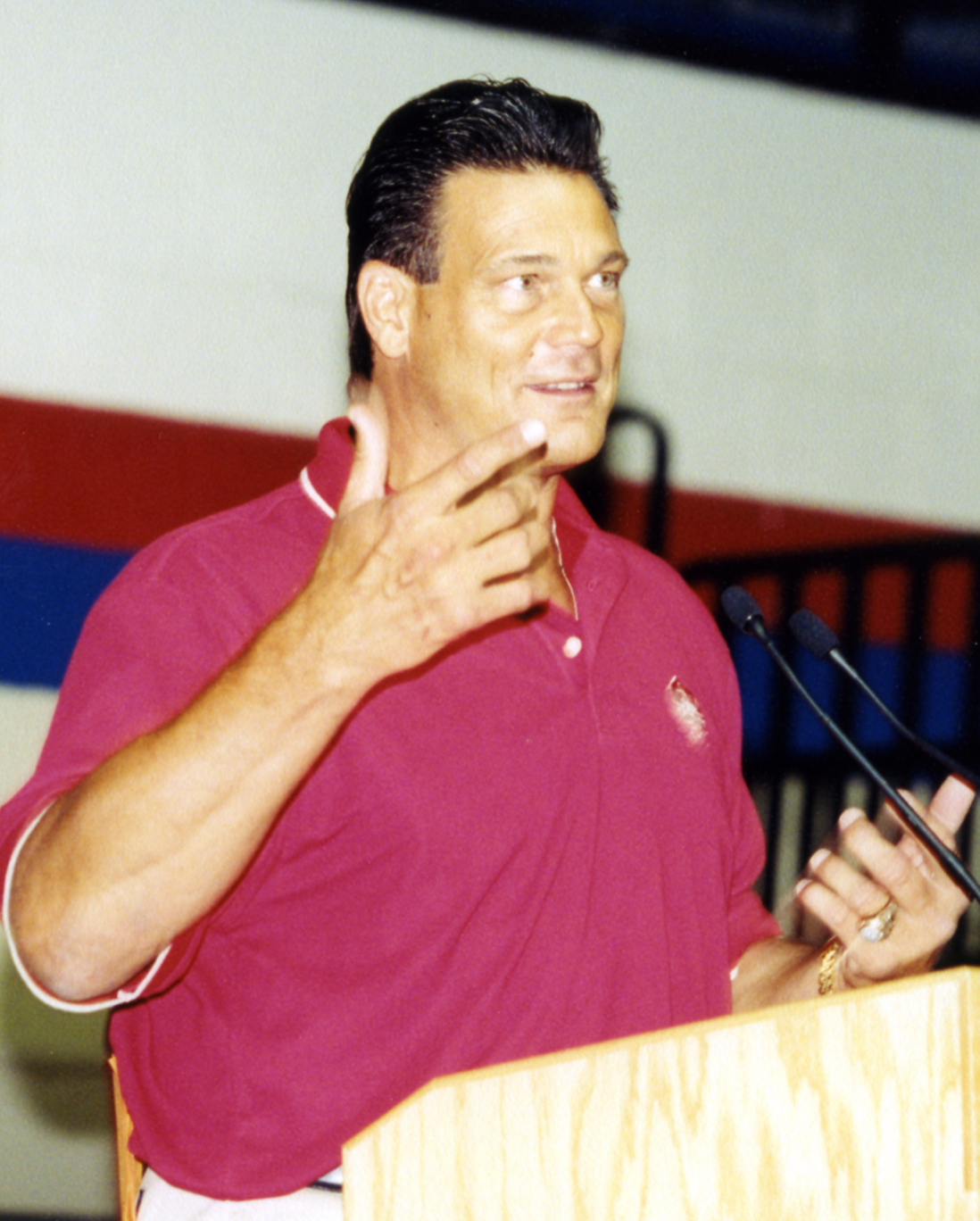
Hall of Fame DL Dan Hampton (1975–78) was a member of the legendary '85 Chicago Bears "46 defense"

Holtz led the Razorbacks through a 10–1 regular season in 1977, losing only to No. 2 Texas. The No. 6 Hogs were invited to play in the Orange Bowl against No. 2 Oklahoma. The Sooners had a chance to become national champions with a win over the shorthanded Razorbacks, who had suffered a season-long rash of injuries and player suspensions. Prior to Christmas, the university announced that star running back Ben Cowins, leading receiver Donny Bobo, and back-up running back Michael Forrest would all be sent back to Fayetteville. Following the suspensions, numerous African-American players on the team threatened to boycott the game. The always-quotable Holtz said two days before the game, "I'm one step short of suicide". The Razorbacks found an unlikely hero in Roland Sales, who rushed for 205 yards on 23 carries and two scores. Sales also led the Hogs in receiving in the contest. In addition, Holtz used third-string running back Randy Richey, who added 98 rushing yards and a touchdown on only 5 carries. The Hogs ended the Sooners' hope with a 31–6 victory. This game is notable as one of the biggest upsets in Razorback football history. Ironically, University of Arkansas alumnus Barry Switzer coached the Sooners in the contest, and late in the game, future Arkansas head coach Houston Nutt played quarterback for Holtz. Arkansas finished the season 11-1 and was selected as a co-national champion for the 1977 season by the Rothman Foundation for the Analysis of Competitions and Tournaments (Rothman (FACT)), along with Notre Dame and Texas, but the university does not claim this title.

In 1978, the Razorbacks went 9–2 during the regular season, losing back-to-back games at No. 8 Texas and No. 11 Houston. A 49–7 win over No. 16 Texas A&M did give the Hogs a Fiesta Bowl berth, but the Razorbacks and UCLA Bruins would battle to a 10–10 tie, as the Razorbacks finished 9–2–1. In 1979, Holtz's Razorbacks won a share of the Southwest Conference (sharing with Houston). The 10–2 Hogs defeated nemesis No. 2 Texas in Little Rock, but lost an outright conference title to No. 6 Houston in Fayetteville. Earning a bid to the Sugar Bowl, the No. 6 Hogs were set to play No. 2 Alabama with a chance at the national championship. Instead, Alabama defeated the Razorbacks 24–9, winning their sixth claimed national title. The Razorbacks would continue to succeed under Holtz, winning the 1980 Hall of Fame Classic following the 1980 regular season and defeating No. 1 Texas by a score of 42–11 in 1981. Despite winning the 1982 Bluebonnet Bowl over the Florida Gators and finishing 9–2–1 in 1982, a 6–5 season in 1983 would be the end of the Holtz era.

At the time, athletic director Frank Broyles stated that Holtz had resigned and was not fired, but two decades later Broyles acknowledged that Holtz was indeed fired because his actions were negatively affecting the fan base. Holtz would subsequently be hired by Minnesota. Reports also cited his political involvement as a major reason for his firing: controversy arose over his having taped two television advertisements from his coach's office endorsing the re-election of Jesse Helms as Senator from North Carolina at a time when Helms was leading the effort to block Martin Luther King Day from becoming a national holiday. Holtz left the program with a mark of 60–21–2. His teams reached six consecutive bowls (1977–1982), but only won one split conference championship. Holtz used a very conservative option offense.

=== Ken Hatfield era (1984–1989) ===
Ken Hatfield replaced Holtz in 1984. Hatfield played defensive back for Broyles on the 1964 national championship team, and was an All-American punt returner. It was Hatfield's punt return for a touchdown that beat No. 1 Texas in Austin in 1964 that propelled that team to finish undefeated.

Hatfield finished his six-year tenure at Arkansas with a record of 55–17–1 and won back-to-back Southwest Conference titles in 1988 and 1989, Hatfield's last two years, and to date the Razorbacks' most recent conference championships. Hatfield would win seventy-six percent of his games at Arkansas, which is still a record today. He coached three teams to ten-win seasons in 1985, 1988, and 1989, and his 1986 and 1987 teams won nine games. But Hatfield was not successful in bowl games, only winning one (1985 Holiday Bowl) out of six. Hatfield was also criticized for being too conservative in the play-calling of his flexbone offense, with many fans noting that the team only threw three passes the entire game in a 16–14 loss to Texas in 1987, when the Longhorns scored a touchdown on the last play of the game to upset Arkansas. The Hatfield-led Razorbacks also lost to Texas in 1985 by a score of 15–13, when the Texas placekicker successfully made all five of his field goal attempts, but the Arkansas kicker missed two of four attempts. Hatfield would switch to the option-I formation prior to the 1989 season. Hatfield was also criticized for finishing with a losing record against Texas, going 2–4, with both victories on the road in Austin, Texas.

Despite this success, Hatfield had a somewhat frosty relationship with Broyles, and lost out on several key recruits when other coaches spread rumors that he was in Broyles' doghouse. When Broyles signed a new five-year contract as athletic director, Hatfield abruptly resigned less than two weeks after losing the 1990 Cotton Bowl Classic with a ten-win team to accept the head coaching post at Clemson without ever visiting the Clemson campus before taking the job. Hatfield would go on to coach Clemson for four years, winning two bowl games and an ACC championship in 1991, before leaving to coach the Rice Owls for twelve seasons and winning a share of the SWC championship in 1994.

During this period, Broyles engineered Arkansas' move from the Southwest Conference to the Southeastern Conference (SEC), effective with the 1992 season.

=== Jack Crowe era (1990–1992) ===
The Southeastern Conference as it existed from 1992 to 2011

When Hatfield announced he was leaving for Clemson, Broyles was in a difficult situation. Not only was there nowhere near enough time to find a big-name coach, but National Signing Day was only three weeks away. Broyles persuaded Jack Crowe, who had just come to Fayetteville as offensive coordinator, to drop his initial plans to follow Hatfield to Clemson and take over as head coach of the Razorbacks. The decision came as something of a surprise, since Crowe had only won five games in two seasons at Livingston University in the late 1970s. By the start of the season, the Razorbacks had seen Barry Foster give up his senior season to enter the 1990 NFL draft and had lost numerous other players to disciplinary and academic problems. Under the circumstances, the Razorbacks struggled to a 3–8 record–their first losing season since 1967, and only their fifth sub-.500 record since the 1950s. They barely qualified for a bowl in 1991.

The Razorbacks opened the 1992 season—their first in the Southeastern Conference—with an upset loss to a Division I-AA team, The Citadel. The next day, Broyles announced that Crowe had resigned and that defensive coordinator Joe Kines would coach the Razorbacks for the rest of the season. However, Crowe's lawyer subsequently told Sports Illustrated that Crowe had been fired, and Broyles admitted that he'd fired Crowe due to concern that the fans no longer had confidence in him. He finished 9–15 in two seasons and one game in Fayetteville.

=== Danny Ford era (1993–1997) ===
Joe Kines brought Danny Ford to Arkansas in 1992 to help with the clean-up following Frank Broyles' firing of Jack Crowe (Ford's former offensive coordinator at Clemson) after a loss to the Citadel. This immediately led to speculation that Ford would be named head coach on a permanent basis. The speculation bore fruit after the season, when Ford was named head coach. He led Arkansas to its first SEC West championship in 1995 on the legs of Madre Hill and the defensive genius of Joe Lee Dunn, after emerging from two years under Crowe. However, this was one of only two winning seasons the Razorbacks notched during Ford's tenure. Broyles fired Ford following back-to-back 4–7 campaigns. Ford finished 26–30–1 in five seasons with the Razorbacks.

It was ironic that Ford ended up at Arkansas, since his replacement at Clemson was former Razorback head coach Ken Hatfield, who had had his own falling out with Arkansas athletic director Frank Broyles. Hatfield took the Clemson job in January 1990, less than a week after Ford resigned, without even visiting the campus.

Ford proved to be a solid recruiter, as his replacement at Arkansas, Houston Nutt, went on to win 17 games in the 1998 (9–3) and 1999 (8–4) seasons combined, to include a 1998 SEC West co-championship and a Cotton Bowl championship on January 1, 2000, with a victory over Texas. Both of those squads were made up primarily of players Ford had recruited to Arkansas.

=== Houston Nutt era (1998–2007) ===
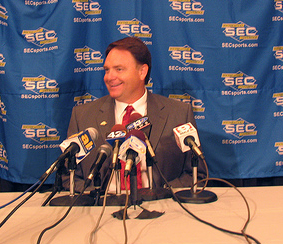
Coach Nutt

On December 10, 1997, Boise State head coach Houston Nutt was hired by the University of Arkansas to succeed Danny Ford. Upon his arrival at Arkansas, Nutt invigorated the Hog fan base with his enthusiasm and high energy.

Under Nutt, the Razorbacks were one of three SEC schools to play in three New Year's Day bowls within five years. Nutt's teams were noted for a series of overtime games, including the two longest overtime games in NCAA history. Off the field, some of Nutt's players were named to the SEC Academic Honor Roll 145 times and he has established a reputation as a responsible coach academically.

Nutt received some criticism for a SEC win–loss record that was just barely over .500 and because he calls his own offensive plays during a game instead of relying on an offensive coordinator. In his first six seasons, Nutt led the team to a bowl game each year and averaged eight wins per season.

Nutt's Razorbacks were picked to finish last in the Southeastern Conference Western Division in 1998 but ended up with a 9–3 record and a share of the division title. The Razorbacks lost to the eventual national champion Tennessee Volunteers on Tennessee's home field after quarterback Clint Stoerner fumbled while trying to run out the clock.

For their efforts, the Razorbacks received their first-ever invitation to the Citrus Bowl and ended the season ranked No. 16 after losing to Michigan. Nutt was selected as the Football News' National Coach of the Year.

In 1999, Nutt's Razorbacks were picked to win the SEC Western Division, but suffered a series of setbacks during the season. They recovered to defeat nationally ranked Tennessee and Mississippi State to earn a Cotton Bowl Classic bid versus arch-rival Texas.

The Razorbacks defeated Texas 27–6, becoming the first team to ever hold Texas to negative rushing yards in a game. The Cotton Bowl victory propelled Arkansas into the top 20 to end the season.

The 2000 season saw the Razorbacks lose the core of their team and suffer a string of injuries, including season-ending injuries to all of the starting running backs. The Razorbacks struggled throughout the season until the final two games when they defeated ranked Mississippi State and LSU teams to pull out another winning record and a Las Vegas Bowl appearance.

In the 2001 season, the Razorbacks started off with three straight losses in SEC play.

On November 3, 2001, Arkansas defeated Ole Miss 58–56 in 7 overtimes, a record for the longest college football game at the time. The Rebels, led by freshman quarterback Eli Manning, took their second loss of the 2001 season after failing to complete a 4-yard Two-point conversion in the seventh OT period. "It was gladiator-like," Nutt said after the game. "TD after TD. Two points after two points."

They then came back to win six of the last seven including victories over ranked South Carolina and Auburn teams.

Based on this performance, the Razorbacks were selected to return to the Cotton Bowl Classic to face the defending national champion Oklahoma Sooners. Arkansas lost, gaining only 50 yards of total offense and just six first downs. Nutt was named SEC coach of the year by the Associated Press and by the SEC coaches.

In 2002, Nutt's Razorbacks stumbled midway through the season but pulled together five straight wins, including a last second touchdown pass against LSU, often referred to as the "Miracle on Markham" to pull out a share of a Western Division title. Arkansas was defeated by the Georgia Bulldogs in the SEC Championship Game and ended the season with a loss to Minnesota in the Music City Bowl.

In 2003, Nutt's team started off with a 4–0 record including a win against No. 5 Texas on their home field. The early season success raised fan expectations sky-high and put Nutt under intense pressure when the Razorbacks lost their next three games, putting them out of contention for the national championship or even the SEC Western Division crown.

The Razorbacks won four of their final five games and defeated Missouri in the Independence Bowl. After the 2003 season, Nebraska was rumored to be courting Nutt to be their head coach, after the firing of Frank Solich.

The 2004 and 2005 campaigns were widely expected to be rebuilding years due to young teams. The 2004 season ended with a 5–6 record and without a bowl invitation for the first time under Nutt.

The 2005 season was also a rebuilding year as expected.

Tough losses to USC (70–17) as well as to Vanderbilt and South Carolina showed that the season had been predicted accurately. The team was ineligible for a bowl for the second season in a row (and the second season overall under coach Nutt). This led to Razorback fans calling for coaching changes.

After meeting with Frank Broyles (athletic director) at the conclusion of the season, coaching changes were made by Nutt in the offseason at the risk of being fired, the most notable of which was the forced addition of Gus Malzahn, previously the head coach at Springdale High School in Springdale, Arkansas, as offensive coordinator.

The hiring of Malzahn allowed Nutt to sign several highly recruited Springdale players, including Springdale High School quarterback Mitch Mustain and wide receiver Damian Williams who eventually transferred to USC.

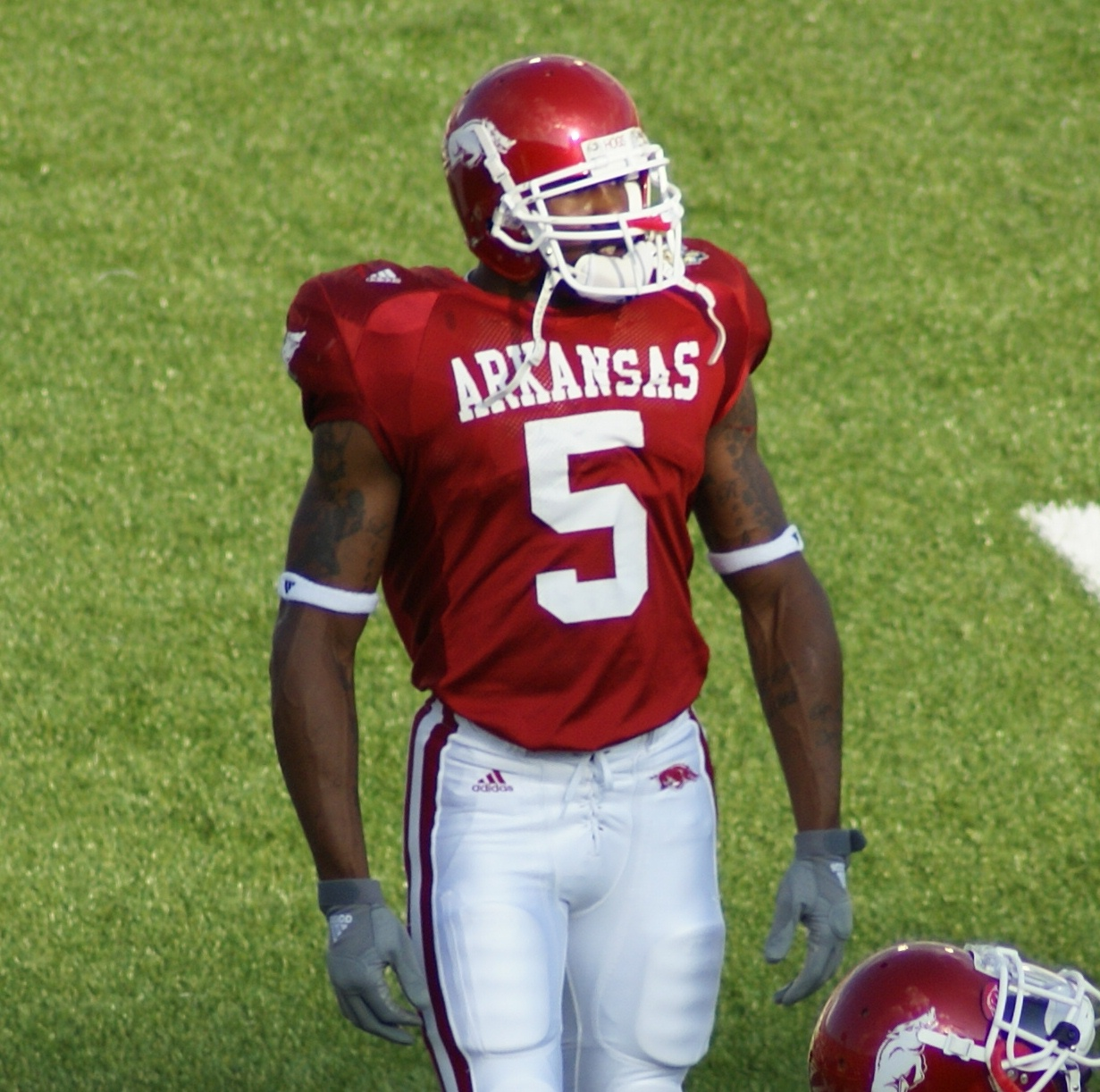
Star running back Darren McFadden

The 2006 season began with a new offensive coordinator in Malzahn. The Razorbacks started the season losing 50–14, at a home game in Fayetteville, to USC. Following the loss to the Trojans, Nutt announced that Mustain would replace Robert Johnson as the Hogs' starting quarterback.

Mustain led Arkansas to eight straight wins, including wins against No. 22 Alabama at home and No. 2 Auburn at Auburn, before losing the starting job to Casey Dick. Dick had been slotted to start at the beginning of the season but was unable to do so due to a back injury suffered in the spring.

Dick led the Razorbacks to two victories out of four for a total of 10 wins, including a win over No. 13 Tennessee. The Razorbacks moved to No. 7 in the BCS standings. However, the Hogs lost their last regular season game to the No. 8 LSU Tigers, 31–26. Despite the loss, the Hogs were still Western Division Champions of the SEC, and played the 11–1, fourth-ranked Florida Gators for the SEC Championship. Florida won, 38–28.

The Razorbacks then lost to the No. 5 Wisconsin Badgers on New Year's Day, 2007 in the Capital One Bowl. A highlight of the season was the second-place finish of sophomore tailback Darren McFadden in the Heisman Trophy voting.

Nutt was named SEC coach of the year by the Associated Press and by the SEC coaches for the second time. The Razorbacks finished the season at 10–4.

The 2007 season began with the Razorbacks ranked No. 21 by the AP Poll. The Hogs opened at home with a victory over Troy. However, early losses to Alabama and Kentucky knocked Arkansas out of the rankings and made the remaining SEC schedule an uphill struggle, even with Darren McFadden, Felix Jones, and Peyton Hillis in the Razorback backfield.

Fan frustration boiled over to some fans wearing all black T-shirts with anti-Nutt statements and buying an entire page in a local Little Rock newspaper calling for Nutt to be fired. A non-official flyover was made hours before the Auburn home game with a small airplane holding a banner, which read: "Fire Houston Nutt. Players and fans deserve better."

On November 23, 2007, in Baton Rouge, Nutt's Razorbacks beat the top-ranked football team in the nation on the road. In a game that lasted three overtimes, Arkansas defeated eventual national champion LSU Tigers, 50–48, returning the Golden Boot back to Arkansas. Arkansas finished the season with an 8–5 record.

Three days later, Nutt resigned as head coach of the Arkansas Razorbacks amid several controversies and rumors, which had come prior to and throughout the 2007 season. He left the school with a 75–48 record, which is second on the school's all-time win list, behind only Frank Broyles.

=== Bobby Petrino era (2008–2011) ===
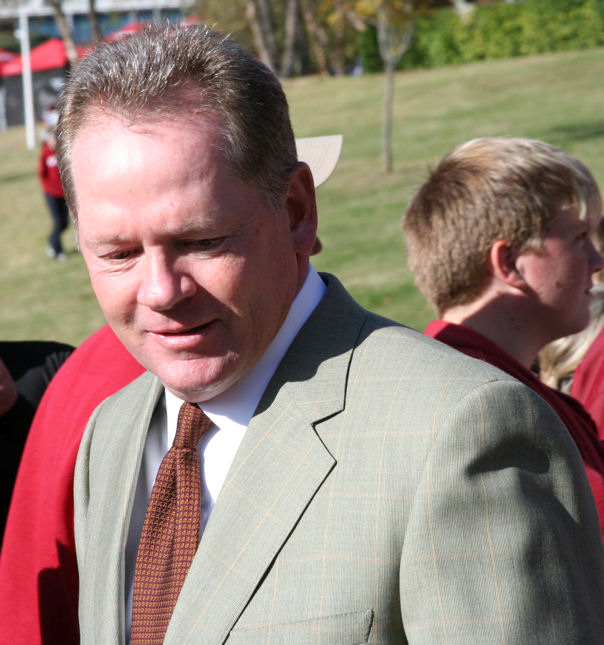
Coach Petrino during the pre-game "Hog Walk" to the stadium in 2008

On December 11, 2007, former Louisville head coach Bobby Petrino came to Arkansas from the NFL's Atlanta Falcons to become the Razorbacks' 31st head coach. Petrino was regarded as an up-and-coming college coach who, despite his failed 11-month stint with the Falcons, had led Louisville to 41 wins in 50 games and was regarded as one of the nation's brilliant offensive minds, employing a spread hybrid offense.

Hired by newly hired athletic director Jeff Long, Petrino signed a five-year contract worth $2.85 million per year with the university administration.

The 2008 season was expected to be a transition year for the team and Petrino. Though eliminated from bowl contention, Petrino led the Razorbacks to a last-second victory over rival and defending national champions LSU (nicknamed the Miracle on Markham II) to finish the season 5–7 and a conference mark of 2–6.

Petrino's 2009 Razorbacks made dramatic improvement. Led by Michigan transfer Ryan Mallett at quarterback, the Razorbacks nearly defeated the Tim Tebow-led Florida Gators, who were ranked No. 1 in the country at that time, in Gainesville, Florida.

The Hogs went on to win the 2010 Liberty Bowl against East Carolina and finish with a record of 8–5.

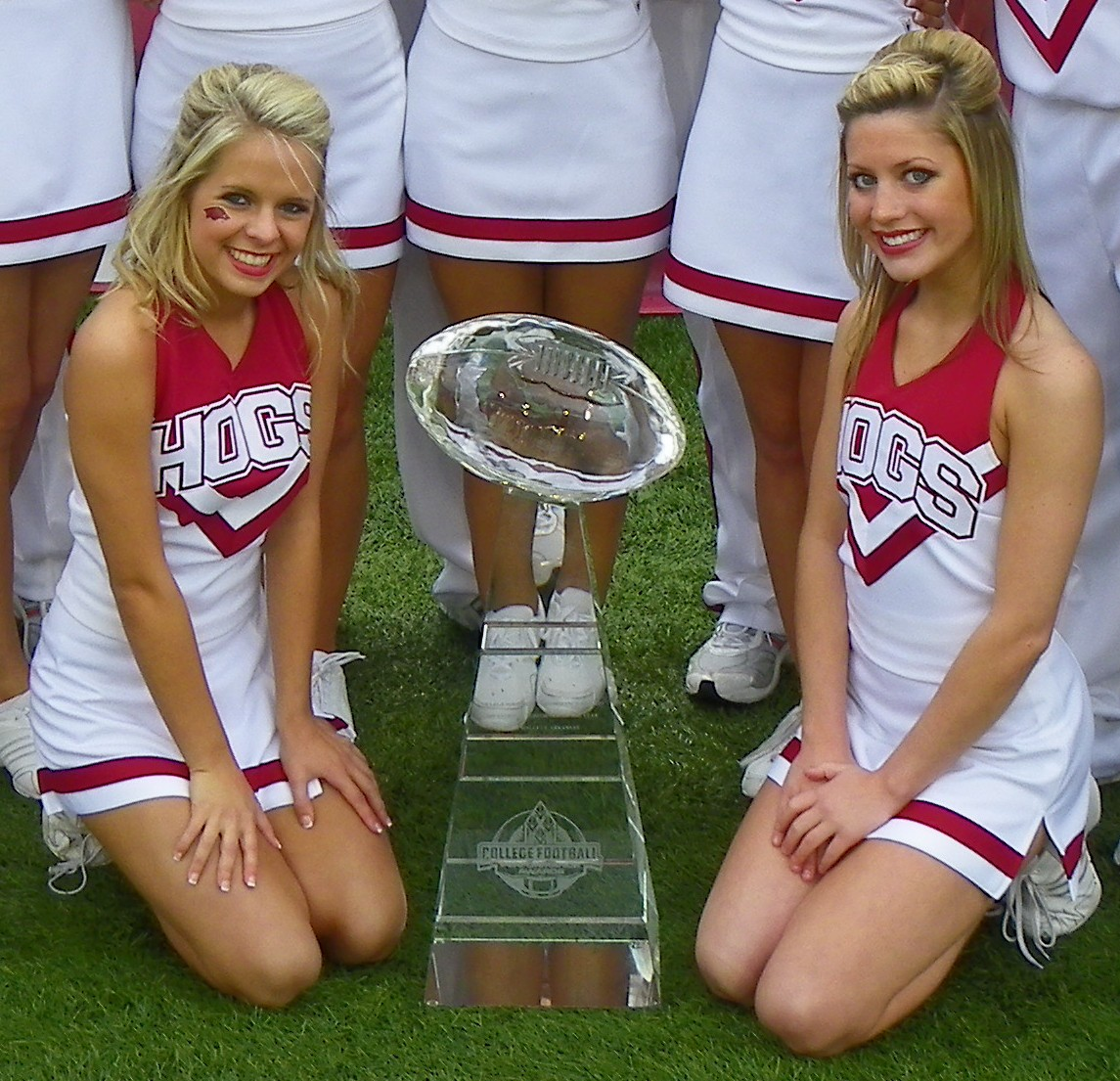
Cheerleaders pose with an award given to former football player Ryan Mallett, 2010.

The 2010 Arkansas Razorbacks improved on their 2009 record and won six in a row to end the year after earlier losses to Alabama and Auburn. Arkansas finished the season 10–2 overall and earned a BCS bowl berth, the first in Arkansas history.

The Razorbacks lost the Sugar Bowl in New Orleans against the sixth ranked Ohio State Buckeyes by a score of 31–26. Though the result was later vacated by the NCAA as a result of sanctions against Ohio State, the game was the first game ever played between the two teams.

Under Petrino's tutelage, quarterback Ryan Mallett broke numerous school passing records in 2010 as well. On December 11, 2010, Petrino received a seven-year contract extension from the University of Arkansas administration.

In 2011, the reins were handed to Tyler Wilson after Mallett went to the NFL. Wilson picked up where Mallett left off, and Arkansas spent more than half the season ranked in the top ten.

After beating Kansas State in the Cotton Bowl Classic by a score of 29–16, the Razorbacks finished with an 11–2 record and a No. 5 final ranking in the AP poll, the school's highest ranking since 1977.

The eleven wins also tied a school record. The only two teams to beat the Hogs that year were Alabama and LSU, the two teams that played each other for the national championship.

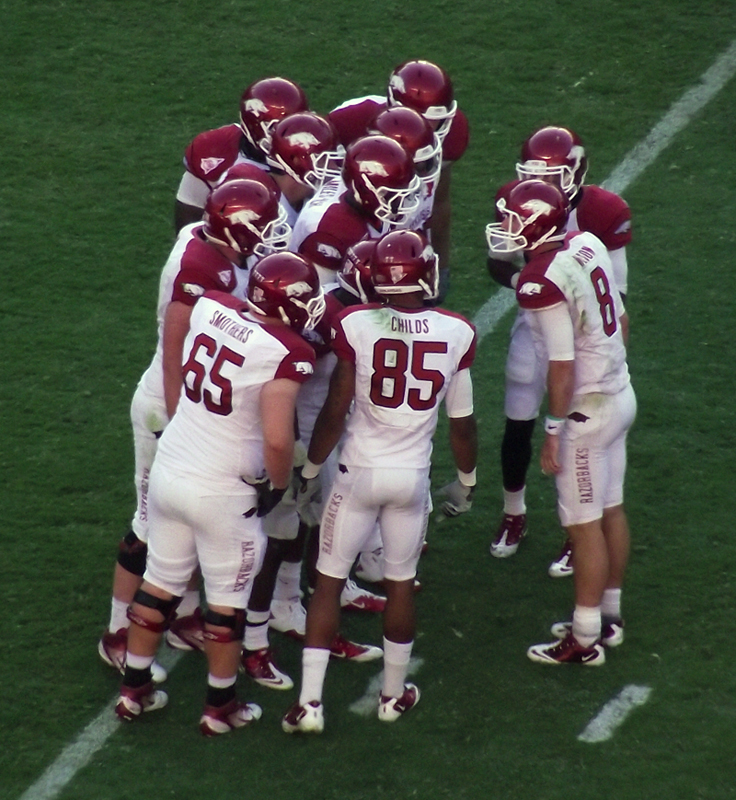
Quarterback Tyler Wilson leads the Razorbacks in the huddle vs Alabama (2011)

On April 1, 2012, Petrino was involved in a single-vehicle motorcycle crash in rural Madison County, near Crosses. After initially stating publicly that he was alone, both in a written press release and during a press conference, it was discovered in the police report of the accident that Petrino had been riding with a passenger, former Arkansas All-SEC volleyball player Jessica Dorrell.

In his acknowledgement of the report, Petrino admitted to having engaged in a "previous inappropriate relationship" with Dorrell. As a result of this information, athletics director Jeff Long placed Petrino on paid administrative leave, pending an investigation.

On April 10, 2012, after his investigation, Long announced that he had fired Petrino with cause, saying that Petrino "engaged in a pattern of misleading and manipulative behavior designed to deceive me and members of the athletic staff, both before and after the motorcycle accident."

He also revealed that in addition to his previously undisclosed personal relationship, Petrino had secretly paid Dorrell $20,000 and had used his influence to ensure that she was selected from an applicant pool of 159 people for a position on the football coaching staff. Long believed the payment could expose Arkansas to a sexual harassment suit if Petrino were retained.

Petrino left Arkansas with a 34–17 record.

=== John L. Smith era (2012) ===
On April 23, 2012, Petrino's coaching mentor, John L. Smith, was announced as Arkansas' 32nd head football coach.

Smith signed a 10-month contract worth $850,000. While the length of the contract made it appear that Smith was merely an interim hire, Arkansas' official announcement described Smith as "head coach," without any qualifier.

School officials did announce that the 10-month contract would give them a chance to "identify a head coach for the future of the program." Smith's hiring was ironic, as Petrino had succeeded Smith as head coach at Louisville. Just four months earlier, Smith had accepted the head coaching position at his alma mater Weber State after serving under Petrino as special teams coordinator for the Razorbacks.

Smith's hiring was met both with approval and some controversy. A significant number of current players expressed their strong approval for the Smith hire. However, some critics argued that he had abandoned his previous post at Weber State after only 4 1/2 months. ESPN's Gene Wojciechowski claimed Smith was merely "leasing himself to the Razorbacks for a year."

The Razorbacks struggled to a 4–8 record in 2012 despite starting the season with high expectations and being ranked in the Top 10 nationally.

Smith was not retained after the season.

=== Bret Bielema era (2013–2017) ===
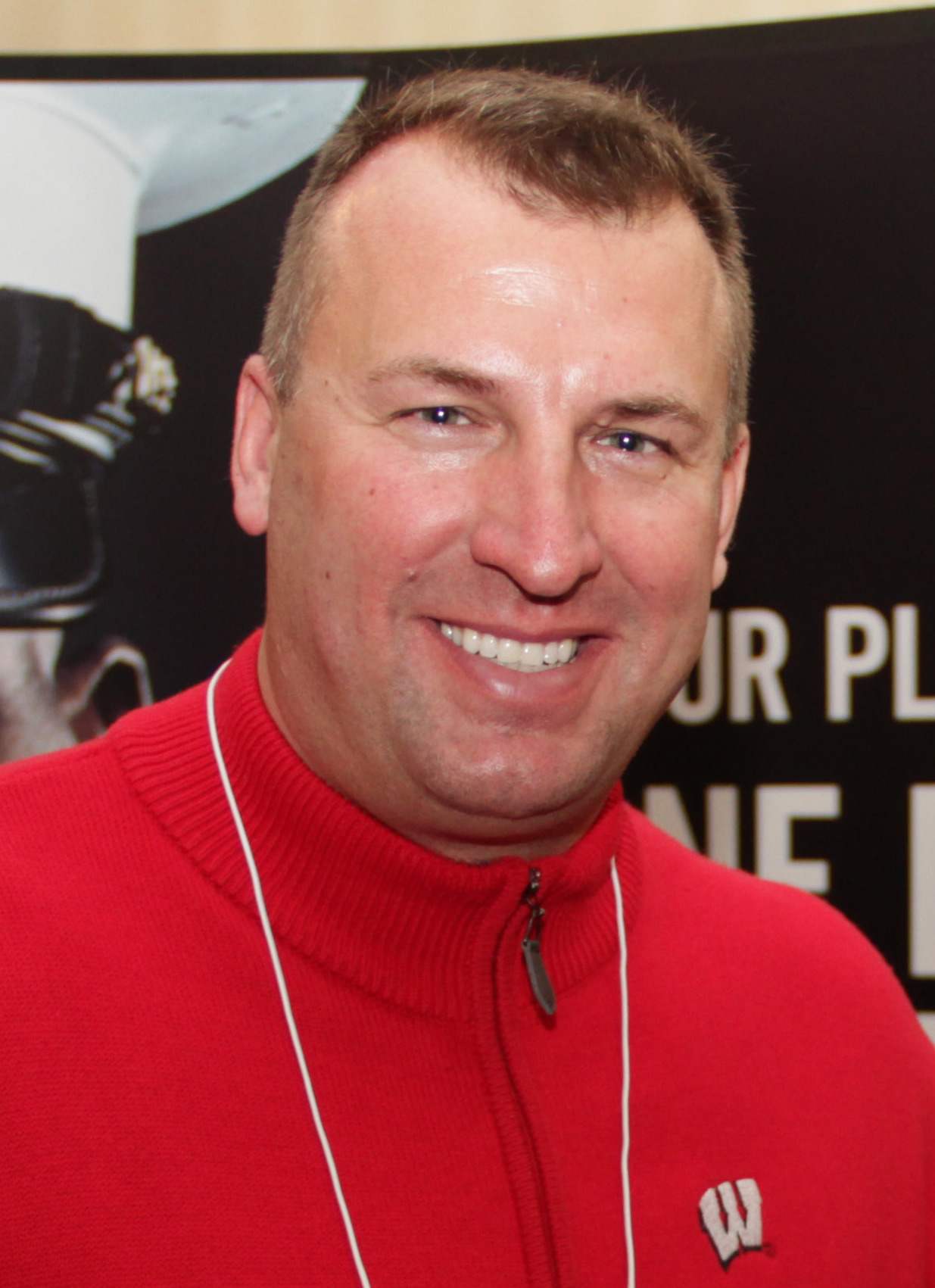
Bret Bielema

On December 4, 2012, it was announced that Bret Bielema would leave the Wisconsin Badgers to become the 33rd head coach in Arkansas history.

Bielema's first season at Arkansas resulted in an overall record of 3–9, 0–8 in the SEC. It was the Razorbacks' worst SEC mark since entering the league in 1992 and their first winless in-conference season since 1942, when they were a member of the Southwest Conference.

Bielema's second season saw him improve on his first, as Arkansas finished 7–6. Bielema won his first two SEC games in dominating fashion in November, beating No. 17 LSU 17–0 on November 15, 2014, and No. 8 Ole Miss 30–0 on November 22, 2014, to achieve bowl eligibility.

Though Arkansas lost its remaining conference game against Missouri, they still achieved a Texas Bowl victory in the postseason, defeating Texas 31–7.

In Bielema's third season, the Razorbacks got off to a slow start, losing to Toledo and Texas Tech and starting 2–4.

The Hogs then caught fire in the second half of the season, going 5–1 over the final six games, with the only loss coming to Mississippi State on a blocked field goal. Arkansas ended the year by beating Kansas State 45–23 in the Liberty Bowl, to finish the season with a record of 8–5.

Bielema's fourth season was a topsy-turvy 7–6 campaign that ended with two embarrassing defeats at the hands of Missouri in the regular season finale and Virginia Tech in the Belk Bowl.

The former saw his team blow a 17–point halftime lead and the latter was a 24–point blown halftime lead, the largest for Arkansas since at least 1952.

Following the 2016 season, Bielema hired Central Michigan head coach Dan Enos as the team's offensive coordinator.

The Hogs went downhill in their 2017 season, finishing 4–8.

Bielema was fired on the field by interim athletic director Julie Cromer minutes after concluding his fifth season with a 48–45 loss to Missouri on November 24, 2017.

=== Chad Morris era (2018–2019) ===
After Bielema's firing, Arkansas initially pursued Auburn head coach and former Razorbacks offensive coordinator Gus Malzahn with a lucrative contract offer to become the Razorbacks head coach, but Malzahn opted to remain at Auburn and signed an extension with the Tigers.

On December 6, 2017, SMU head coach Chad Morris was formally introduced as the 34th head coach of the Arkansas Razorbacks.

Morris had become well-known during his stint as offensive coordinator at Clemson under Dabo Swinney, instituting a fast-paced spread offense that set school records.

The University of Arkansas administration signed Morris to a six-year contract worth $3.5 million annually.

In 2018, the Razorbacks finished last in the SEC conference with a 0–8 standing and 2–10 overall win-loss record.

The Hogs wound up last in the SEC in 2019, with a 0–8 conference record and another 2–10 overall standing.

Morris was fired on November 10, 2019, concluding his tenure with a 4–18 (0–14 in the SEC) record.

=== Sam Pittman era (2020–2025) ===
On December 8, 2019, Georgia's offensive line and associate head coach Sam Pittman was announced as the new head coach for the University of Arkansas. It was his first head coaching job.

On October 3, 2020, he led the Razorbacks to their first SEC win since they beat Ole Miss in 2017. The Razorbacks finished the season with a 3–7 record in an all SEC schedule due to the COVID-19 pandemic.

Arkansas was invited to play in the Mercari Texas Bowl against Texas Christian University. However, due to COVID-19 issues on TCU, the game was canceled.

In 2021, he coached the Razorbacks to a 9–4 record and a 24–10 victory over the Penn State Nittany Lions in the 2022 Outback Bowl in Tampa, Florida on New Year's Day.

The season included victories over the Texas Longhorns (Arkansas' first win over Texas in Fayetteville since 1981), the Texas A&M Aggies (which ended a 9-game losing streak to A&M), the LSU Tigers and the Missouri Tigers (ending 5-game losing streaks to both schools).

The wins over Texas A&M, LSU, and Missouri also meant Arkansas was in possession of all three rivalry trophies (Southwest Classic Trophy, Golden Boot Trophy, Battle Line Rivalry Trophy) in the same season. Pittman was named the 2021 AFCA Region 2 Coach of the Year.

Pittman's team started off strong in 2022, winning its first three games and eventually reached No. 10 in the polls before losing a close contest to Texas A&M, which was highlighted by a fumble on the goal line by KJ Jefferson and a field goal miss off the goalpost by kicker Cam Little.

They would then lose in consecutive weeks to No. 2 Alabama 49–26 and No. 23 Mississippi State 40–17. They rebounded by defeating BYU and Auburn on the road, but suffered close home losses to Liberty and rival No. 7 LSU.

In the Liberty game, they did not get the potential game-tying two-point conversion due to Jefferson's knee being down before he reached the end zone. They beat No. 14 Ole Miss 42–27 the following week and achieved bowl eligibility heading into their rivalry game with Missouri.

The team would successfully defeat the Kansas Jayhawks 55–53 in triple overtime in the 2022 Liberty Bowl.

2023 saw the team limp to a 4–8 record, the worst record in a non-COVID season since Pittman took over for Morris after the 2019 campaign, although it did see the Hogs beat Florida in Gainesville for the first time in program history. Pittman had fired offensive coordinator Dan Enos after eight games in 2023, and after the year concluded, Pittman announced they would be hiring former head coach Bobby Petrino as offensive coordinator.

Petrino's offense, which included bringing in transfer quarterback Taylen Green, helped the team finish a little better in 2024, as they ended up 6-6 and made the 2024 Liberty Bowl.
