= Roland Sales =

American football player (born 1958)

Profile
- Position: Running back

Personal information
- Born: December 5, 1955 (age 70)
- Listed height: 6 ft 1 in (1.85 m)
- Listed weight: 203 lb (92 kg)

Career information
- High school: Arlington Heights (Fort Worth, Texas)
- College: Arkansas
- NFL draft: 1980: 11th round, 294th overall pick

Career history
- Toronto Argonauts (1980)*; Montreal Alouettes (1980)
- * Offseason or practice squad member only

Roland Sales (born 1958) is an American former football running back. He played college football for the Arkansas Razorbacks and professionally in the Canadian Football League. His career is significant because in the 1977 season's 1978 Orange Bowl, Sales set an Orange Bowl rushing record of 205 yards that stood until the 1998 Orange Bowl when Ahman Green broke it by rushing for 206 yards. Sales and Razorbacks teammate Reggie Freeman were named 1978 Orange Bowl MVPs.

== College career ==
An Arkansas native, Sales was recruited by head coach Frank Broyles to play for Arkansas. By his junior year he was playing backup to running back Ben Cowins. The Razorbacks had a powerhouse team in the 1970s. Behind the passing skills of Ron Calcagni, the rushing of Cowins, the defense played by future Chicago Bears star Dan Hampton and the record setting kicking of Steve Little the Razorbacks were always highly ranked during that period. Following Broyles' retirement from coaching he was replaced by head coach Lou Holtz. Up until that time Sales' career had been mediocre.

== 1978 Orange Bowl ==
Coming into the 1978 Orange Bowl the Arkansas Razorbacks were ranked sixth in the nation with a record of 10–1. The Oklahoma Sooners were ranked 2nd in the nation behind the rushing of Heisman Trophy winner Billy Sims. Arkansas head coach Lou Holtz had a reputation for being strict with his players, but he shocked many when he suspended his two starting running backs Ben Cowins and Michael Forrest, and a wide receiver, Donny Bobo prior to the 1978 Orange Bowl. Ben Cowins and Donny Bobo had accounted for 78% of the points scored by the Razorbacks team in that season. The players protested, Holtz would not back down and the suspensions stood. Already considered a heavy underdog to Oklahoma, with the loss of those starters Arkansas was expected to give little competition in the game.

Arkansas was an 18-point underdog prior to the suspensions. After the suspensions they were given as 24-point underdogs by Las Vegas, Nevada odds. Also the #1 ranked University of Texas had just lost a game, which meant a victory over Arkansas by Oklahoma would make Oklahoma the national champions. Thus the 1978 Orange Bowl would in all likelihood be the game that decided the National Championship.

Roland Sales started in the place of Ben Cowins. With Sales doing most of the running of the ball, Arkansas out-rushed Oklahoma 126 yards to 116 yards in the first half, with Sims also fumbling the ball once with the Razorbacks recovering on the Oklahoma 9-yard line. In total, Sales rushed 22 times for 205 yards and caught four passes for 52 yards. He scored two rushing touchdowns. Arkansas defeated Oklahoma 31–6. Arkansas finished the season ranked #3 in the nation behind #1-ranked Notre Dame and #2-ranked Alabama.

== Professional career ==
Sales was chosen in the 11th round of the 1980 National Football League Draft by the Cleveland Browns as the 294th selection overall. He never played in the NFL, but played the 1980 season with the Canadian Football League's Montreal Alouettes. He rushed for only 54 yards total in three games.
