= Ron Calcagni =

American gridiron football player and coach (born 1957)

No. 18
- Position: Quarterback

Personal information
- Born: February 6, 1957 (age 69); Youngstown, Ohio, U.S.

Career information
- College: University of Arkansas

Career history
- 1979: Montreal Alouettes
- 1980–1981: Ottawa Rough Riders

Awards and highlights
- First-team All-SWC (1977); Arkansas Hall of Honor (2009); Arkansas Sports Hall of Fame (2015)

Career statistics
- Record: 25-4-2

Ron Calcagni (born February 6, 1957) is a former quarterback for the University of Arkansas Razorbacks football team from 1975 to 1978. Calcagni was born in Youngstown, Ohio. An All-State in high school, Calcagni was initially recruited by Bo Rein to play for North Carolina State University. However, Rein left North Carolina State to coach under Frank Broyles at Arkansas and convinced Calcagni to follow him there. Rein would return to North Carolina State as head coach before Calcagni graduated from Arkansas.

Calcagni had a record setting career with Arkansas. His 25–4–2 winning record made him the 2nd winningest quarterback in Razorbacks history. Calcagni is perhaps best known for his role in the defeat of the heavily favored #2 ranked Oklahoma Sooners in the 1978 Orange Bowl. Following that upset victory Calcagni, running back Ben Cowins, and head coach Lou Holtz were on the September 11th, 1978 cover of Sports Illustrated. He also helped the Razorbacks to a 1976 Cotton Bowl Classic victory over the University of Georgia and a Fiesta Bowl tie with UCLA.

During his time at Arkansas Calcagni played alongside Chicago Bears great Dan Hampton, running back Cowins, and record setting kicker Steve Little. The Razorbacks went 10–2 in 1975, 5-5-1 in 1976, 11–1 in 1977 and 9-2-1 in 1978 with Calcagni as starting quarterback.

== Professional and coaching careers ==
Despite his success in college Calcagni was not drafted into the NFL. He played three seasons in the Canadian Football League for the Montreal Alouettes and the Ottawa Rough Riders before entering into a career as a coach. He worked as quarterbacks and receivers coach for the University of Oklahoma, Oklahoma State University and the University of Tulsa. Calcagni worked as inside receivers coach for the University of Houston from 1987 to 1991. Ron Calcagni currently is the head coach for the Pulaski Heights Middle School Panthers where he has won three district championships. He has also served as the President of Marketing for Arkansas Sports Entertainment. He is also the Physical Education teacher.

In 2009, Calcagni was inducted into the University of Arkansas Sports Hall of Honor, and in 2015, he was inducted into the Arkansas Sports Hall of Fame.
