= Ben Cowins =

American gridiron football player (born 1956)

Profile
- Position: Running back

Personal information
- Born: April 7, 1956 (age 70); St. Louis, Missouri, U.S.
- Listed height: 6 ft 0 in (1.83 m)
- Listed weight: 192 lb (87 kg)

Career information
- College: Arkansas
- NFL draft: 1979: 4th round, 94th overall pick

Career history
- Philadelphia Eagles (1979)*; Kansas City Chiefs (1979); Toronto Argonauts (1980)
- * Offseason or practice squad member only

Awards and highlights
- Second-team All-American (1977); 3× First-team All-SWC (1976, 1977, 1978)

Ben Cowins (born April 7, 1956) is an American former professional football player who was a running back for the Toronto Argonauts of the Canadian Football League (CFL). He played college football for the Arkansas Razorbacks from 1975 to 1978.

== College career ==
Cowins played alongside Ron Calcagni, Chicago Bears great Dan Hampton and record-setting kicker Steve Little, and was the University of Arkansas' all-time leader in rushing attempts (635), rushing yards (3,570), rushing touchdowns (30) and 100-yard rushing games (16), all of which were later surpassed by Darren McFadden. Cowins helped Arkansas to a win over the University of Georgia in the Cotton Bowl. However, he was suspended by head coach Lou Holtz for team violations stemming from an on-campus incident prior to the 1978 Orange Bowl victory over Oklahoma. In the Razorbacks' decisive 31–6 victory, backup running back Roland Sales set an Orange Bowl record of 205 rushing yards, a mark that stood for two decades. Cowins later played during a 10–10 tie in the Fiesta Bowl against UCLA.

During Cowins' tenure, the Razorbacks went 10–2 in 1975, 5–5–1 in 1976, 11–1 in 1977 and 9–2–1 in 1978.

== Professional career ==
Cowins was a fourth-round pick (94th overall) in the 1979 NFL draft by the Philadelphia Eagles but was then signed by the Kansas City Chiefs. Despite his success in college, he was released by the Chiefs after only one season, and he played in three games in the 1980 season for the Canadian Football League's Toronto Argonauts. He rushed 28 times for 144 yards and a touchdown as well as five receptions for an additional 33 yards. After his career ended he opened a successful brokerage company in his hometown of St. Louis.
