= 1980 Hall of Fame Classic =

| Tulane Green Wave | Arkansas Razorbacks |
| (7–4) | (6–5) |
| 15 | 34 |
| Head coach: Vince Gibson | Head coach: Lou Holtz |
| | 1 | 2 | 3 | 4 | Total |
|---|---|---|---|---|---|
| Tulane | 0 | 0 | 0 | 15 | 15 |
| Arkansas | 14 | 14 | 3 | 3 | 34 |
- Date: December 27, 1980
- Season: 1980
- Stadium: Legion Field
- Location: Birmingham, Alabama
- MVP: RB Gary Anderson; LB Billy Ray Smith
- Referee: Raleigh J. Girouard
- Attendance: 30,000

The 1980 Hall of Fame Classic was a college football postseason bowl game between the Arkansas Razorbacks and the Tulane Green Wave.

== Background ==
The Razorbacks finished 6th in the Southwestern Conference in their second bowl game in the calendar year of 1980. This was Tulane's second straight bowl appearance (the first time in school history) and fourth in 10 years.

== Game summary ==
James Tolbert started the scoring off for the Razorbacks with his 1-yard touchdown run in the first quarter. Gary Anderson made it 14–0 on his 80-yard punt return for a touchdown. Steve Clyde caught a 9-yard touchdown pass from Tom Jones to make it 21–0, and Anderson added in a touchdown run from 46 yards to give Arkansas a 28–0 halftime lead. Ish Ordonez made it 31–0 on his 40-yard field goal in the 3rd quarter. Tulane finally got on the board on Marcus Anderson's touchdown reception of 62 yards from Nickie Hall to make it 31–7. Ordonez added in his 2nd field goal to make it 34–7 in the fourth quarter. Kelvin Robinson scored on a touchdown plunge to make it 34–14, but Tulane could not score after that as Arkansas won their first bowl game since 1978. Gary Anderson rushed for 156 yards on 11 carries.

== Aftermath ==
Tulane waited seven years to make their next bowl appearance, in 1987. The Razorbacks made seven more bowl games in the decade. Neither returned to this bowl game.

== Statistics ==
| Statistics | Arkansas | Tulane |
|---|---|---|
| First downs | 22 | 18 |
| Rushing yards | 383 | 157 |
| Passing yards | 83 | 241 |
| Total yards | 466 | 398 |
| Pass (comp–att–int) | 5–13–1 | 16–37–2 |
| Fumbles–lost | 0–0 | 3–2 |
| Penalties–yards | 1–19 | 3–15 |
