= 1978 Orange Bowl =

American college football game

- 44th Orange Bowl
- The Miami Orange Bowl in Miami, Florida, hosted the Orange Bowl.
Arkansas Razorbacks	Oklahoma Sooners
(10–1)	(10–1)
SWC	Big Eight
31	6
Head coach: Lou Holtz	Head coach: Barry Switzer
AP / Coaches; 6 / 6	AP / Coaches; 2 / 2
	1	2	3	4	Total
Arkansas	14	0	10	7	31
Oklahoma	0	0	0	6	6
- Date: January 2, 1978
- Season: 1977
- Stadium: Orange Bowl
- Location: Miami, Florida
- MVP: Roland Sales (Arkansas RB); Reggie Freeman (Ark. NG)
- Favorite: Oklahoma by 18 points
- Referee: R. Pete Williams (SEC) (split crew: SEC and Big Ten)
- Halftime show: Main Street Electrical Parade
- Attendance: 60,987

United States TV coverage
- Network: NBC
- Announcers: Jim Simpson, Merlin Olsen
- Nielsen ratings: 27.7

The 1978 Orange Bowl was the 44th edition of the college football bowl game, played at the Orange Bowl in Miami, Florida, on Monday, January 2. Part of the 1977–78 bowl game season, it matched the sixth-ranked Arkansas Razorbacks of the Southwest Conference (SWC) against the heavily-favored #2 Oklahoma Sooners of the Big Eight Conference.

The Razorbacks were 10–1, but were heavy underdogs. Earlier in the day, top-ranked Texas and their Heisman Trophy-winning running back Earl Campbell had lost the Cotton Bowl 38–10 to #5 Notre Dame (led by quarterback Joe Montana). In the regular season, Texas had defeated Oklahoma and Arkansas on consecutive weekends en route to its 11–0 record. If Oklahoma defeated Arkansas in this Orange Bowl game, then the Sooners would have an inside track to the national championship.

New Year's Day was on Sunday in 1978, and the major college bowl games were played the following day.

== Teams ==
Both football teams had only one regular-season loss, and both had lost to top-ranked Texas. Before the Orange Bowl kicked off, the Longhorns had fallen to Notre Dame. Under these circumstances, it seemed likely that the outcome of this Orange Bowl would decide which football team would win the national championship; the game's outcome did lead to the choosing of the national champion, but not in the way that most had expected.

=== Arkansas ===
This was the Arkansas football team's first appearance in the Orange Bowl. To complicate matters for Arkansas, first-year head coach Lou Holtz suspended three players prior to the game for team violations. Two of those three players, running back Ben Cowins and wide receiver Donny Bobo, had scored 78% of the Hogs' points during the regular season.

Although the suspended Arkansas players protested, Holtz refused to back down and the suspensions stood. Arkansas had already been considered to be a heavy underdog versus Oklahoma, so after losing those starters the Razorbacks were not expected to compete. Prior to the suspensions, Arkansas had been an 18-point underdog. After the suspensions, Las Vegas oddsmakers listed the Razorbacks as 24-point underdogs.

=== Oklahoma ===
This was Oklahoma's ninth appearance in the Orange Bowl. The Sooners' only defeat during the regular season had been a seven-point loss to Texas in Dallas in early October. Oklahoma was led offensively by redshirt sophomore halfback Billy Sims—who would win the Heisman Trophy two seasons later—and on defense by safety Darrol Ray and linebacker Daryl Hunt.

== Game summary ==
Backup running back Roland Sales started for Arkansas in the place of Cowins. With Sales leading the way, Arkansas outrushed Oklahoma 126 yards to 116 yards in the first half. Sims fumbled the ball early in the first quarter, which the Razorbacks recovered on the Oklahoma 9 yard line. Two plays later, Sales scored a touchdown, followed by a PAT by kicker Steve Little. Another Oklahoma fumble in the first quarter by Kenny King resulted in a second Arkansas touchdown on a keeper by Hog quarterback Ron Calcagni. In the second half, Sales rushed for another touchdown, Barnabas White rushed for a touchdown and Little kicked a field goal. A ferocious Arkansas defense, led by defensive tackle Dan Hampton, dominated the Sooner offense as the Hogs built a 24–0 lead after three quarters. Oklahoma scored early in the fourth, but a two-point conversion attempt failed.

Sales rushed 22 times for 205 yards, an Orange Bowl record. He also caught four passes for 52 yards and rushed for two touchdowns. Arkansas defeated Oklahoma 31–6. Sales's Orange Bowl rushing record stood for twenty years, until broken by Ahman Green (206 yards in 1998). Sales and Arkansas teammate Reggie Freeman were named MVPs for the game. Arkansas was ranked third in both final polls, behind Notre Dame (Holtz's future employer) and Alabama.

The halftime show was a presentation of the Main Street Electrical Parade, one of only two times the parade has taken place outside a Disney park. Floats based on Alice in Wonderland and Pete's Dragon were featured.

=== Scoring ===
First quarter

- Arkansas – Roland Sales 1-yard run (Steve Little kick)
- Arkansas – Ron Calcagni 1-yard run (Little kick)

Second quarter
No scoring
Third quarter

- Arkansas – Little 32-yard FG
- Arkansas – Sales 4-yard run (Little kick)

Fourth quarter

- Oklahoma – Victor Hicks 8-yard pass from Dean Blevins (run failed)
- Arkansas – Barnabas White 20-yard run (Little kick)

== Statistics ==
Statistics	Arkansas	Oklahoma
First downs	22	19
Rushes–yards	60–317	49–230
Passing yards	90	80
Passes (C–A–I)	7–12–0	7–14–1
Total Offense	72–407	63–310
Punts–average	4–40.5	5–44.4
Fumbles–lost	2–1	4–3
Turnovers	1	4
Penalties–yards	7–50	5–25

== Aftermath ==
Arkansas climbed to third in the final AP poll and Oklahoma fell to seventh.

The Sooners returned the following year and defeated conference rival Nebraska. The Razorbacks' only other Orange Bowl was a rematch eight years later, a 42–8 loss to Oklahoma.
