= Dan Hampton =

American football player (born 1957)

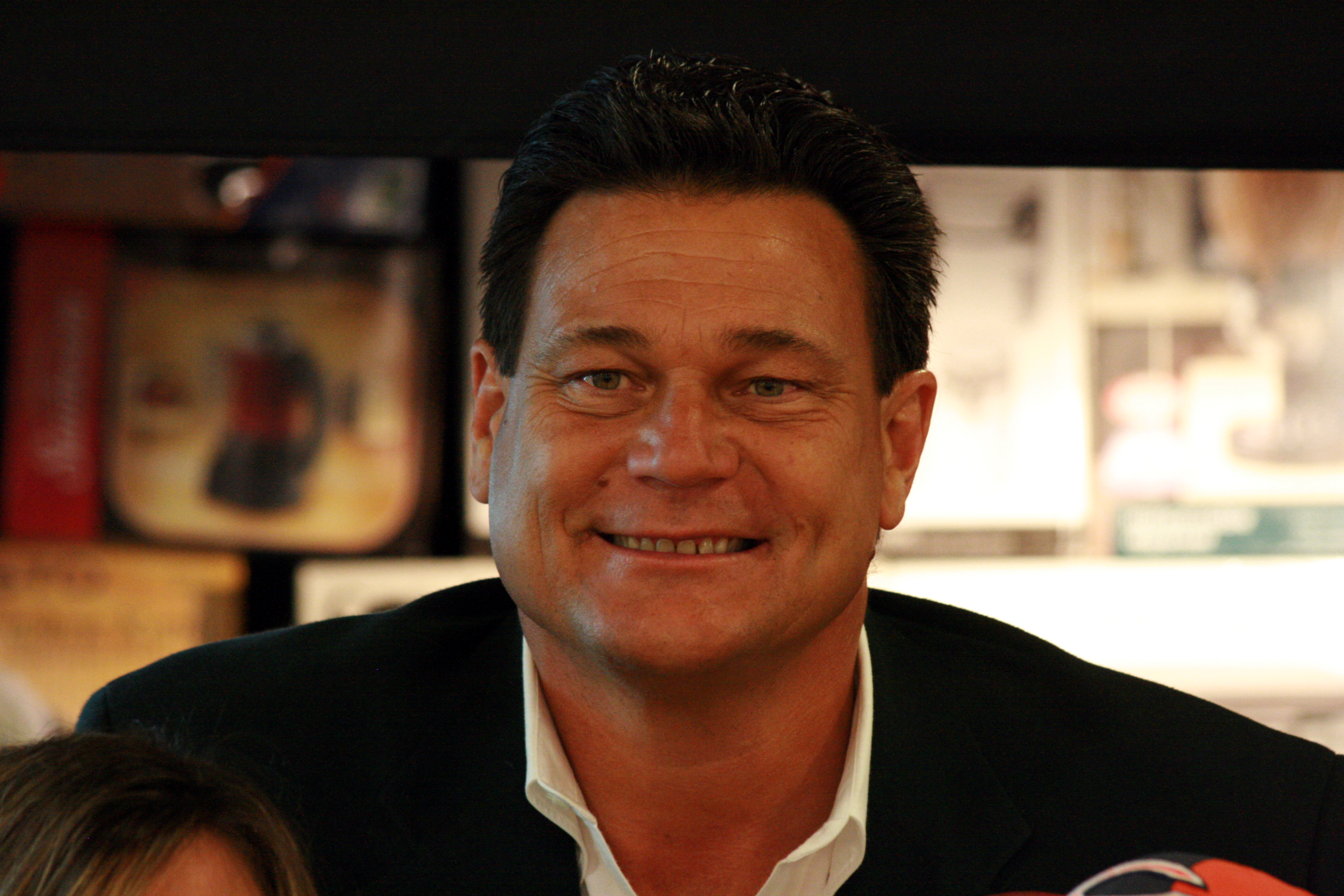
- Hampton in 2008

No. 99
- Position: Defensive tackle

Personal information
- Born: September 19, 1957 (age 69); Oklahoma City, Oklahoma, U.S.
- Listed height: 6 ft 5 in (1.96 m)
- Listed weight: 264 lb (120 kg)

Career information
- High school: Jacksonville (Jacksonville, Arkansas)
- College: Arkansas (1975–1978)
- NFL draft: 1979: 1st round, 4th overall pick

Career history
- Chicago Bears (1979–1990)

Awards and highlights
- Super Bowl champion (XX); First-team All-Pro (1984); 4× Second-team All-Pro (1982, 1985, 1986, 1988); 4× Pro Bowl (1980, 1982, 1984, 1985); NFL 1980s All-Decade Team; PFWA All-Rookie Team (1979); George Halas Award (1991); 100 greatest Bears of All-Time; First-team All-American (1978); SWC Defensive Player of the Year (1978); First-team All-SWC (1978); Second-team All-SWC (1977)

Career NFL statistics
- Sacks: 57
- Fumble Recoveries: 10
- Safeties: 1
- Stats at Pro Football Reference
- Pro Football Hall of Fame
- College Football Hall of Fame

Daniel Oliver Hampton (born September 19, 1957) is an American former professional football player who was a defensive tackle for twelve seasons with the Chicago Bears from 1979 to 1990 in the National Football League (NFL). He was elected to the Pro Football Hall of Fame in 2002. He currently hosts the Bears postgame show on WGN Radio in Chicago.

== Early life ==
The son of Robert and Joan Hampton, he graduated from Jacksonville High School in Jacksonville, AR, in 1975. Hampton played football his junior and senior year. He suffered a disabling fall from a tree that kept him out of organized sports from grades 7–10. He participated in band, playing saxophone and five other instruments. He also played bass guitar and sang for a local band named "Sanctuary Woods". Doug Matthews of Jacksonville filled his large shoes in that band after he left. Whenever he was in town he would come to where they were playing and sit in with them. He never forgot his roots. He was always just like he had never left. Jacksonville High School coach Bill Reed is credited for "rescuing" him from the band.- Dan was also the bassist and vocalist for the band created by "Chicago Sports Profile Magazine" editor Lisa Levine after the success of the "Super Bowl Shuffle". The band "The Chicago Six" played "off season" from 1987 to 1990. The alumni from the group include Walter Payton (drums), Otis Wilson (lead vocalist), Shaun Gayle (sax & voice), Gary Nylund (guitar & voice), Curt Fraser (guitar & voice), drummers Graham Watson, Steve Cobb, and keyboardists John Redfield, Larry Harris and Jeffrey Abbott (Keytarjeff). The band also performed on both local and national television.

== College career ==
Hampton played college football at Arkansas and was selected in the first round of the 1979 NFL draft by the Bears. He was part of a Razorback team that thumped the highly favored Oklahoma Sooners in the 1978 Orange Bowl by a score of 31–6. Several key Razorback players had been suspended for the game by Arkansas Head Coach Lou Holtz which left the team short-handed. The fired up Razorbacks charged from the locker room in a fashion that the media noticed. When asked why the team came out of the locker room in such a hurry, Hampton answered, "Coach Holtz said the first eleven out of the locker room will start."

As a senior Hampton was an All-American as he logged 98 tackles (18 behind the line of scrimmage). He was also named the Southwest Conference Defensive Player of the Year in 1978. In addition, that same season, Hampton was named by the Houston Post the SWC Player of the Year. As a junior, he had 70 tackles (8 for a loss). In 1976, as a sophomore, Hampton made 48 tackles (2 for losses) and recovered two fumbles. As a freshman, he had 21 tackles (4 for a loss). In his career, he made a total of 237 tackles with 32 being behind the line of scrimmage and recovered six fumbles. He was a four-year letterman, a three-year starter at Arkansas and a two-time All-Conference selection. He was also a member of the Razorback All-Decade team of the 1970s. During his time at Arkansas Hampton played alongside Ron Calcagni, Steve Little and Ben Cowins.

In 1991, he was elected to the University of Arkansas Sports Hall of Honor and the following year he was voted to the Arkansas Sports Hall of Fame. In 1994 Hampton was voted to the All-Century team of the University of Arkansas. Hampton was named one of the state of Arkansas' Top 50 greatest athletes in the 20th century.

Mike Ditka remembers scouting Hampton while a member of the Dallas Cowboys coaching staff: "I watched Dan when he came out of Arkansas," Ditka said. "I remember Coach [Tom] Landry saying what a great football player he was going to be."

== Professional career ==
Hampton was selected by the Bears in the first round of the 1979 NFL draft. On June 27, 1979, he signed a four-year $470,000 contract with the club that included a $60,000 signing bonus. In 1979, he was voted All-Rookie by the Pro Football Writers Association. The following year, he was a Second-team All-Pro selection and was voted to his first Pro Bowl after recording 11½ sacks which lead the Bears. His fierce style of play earned him the nickname of "Danimal".

He was selected to four Pro Bowls and was a key defensive member of the Bears' Super Bowl XX win against the New England Patriots in 1986. Hampton was a versatile defensive lineman, making All-Pro at both defensive end and defensive tackle. In all, Hampton was 1st or 2nd team All-Pro in 1980, 1982, 1984, 1985, 1986, and 1988. His versatility likely cost him several post-season honors, for example, in 1986 he was an alternate for the Pro Bowl at both defensive end and defensive tackle. His playing both positions likely split the votes of his NFC peers. Hampton was also a 1st alternate for the Pro Bowl in 1988 and graded out as the top defender on the Bears that season, even though Mike Singletary was the NFL Defensive Player of the Year.

During Hampton's tenure in Chicago (1979–90), the Bears defense ranked #1 in the NFL in allowing the fewest rushing yards, the fewest rushing touchdowns, the fewest total yards, the fewest points and inflicted the most sacks.

"A lot of times in football, it's not so much the stat, but how you play the game. If that's the measuring stick, then Dan Hampton played the game as well as anybody."
Coach Mike Ditka

In 1982, he had a tremendous year while playing defensive tackle, recording 9 sacks in the 9-game, strike-shortened season. He was also named NFL defensive player of the year by Pro Football Weekly. He played out his option after that season and became a free agent. On July 15, 1983, Hampton signed a deal that made him the Bears' second highest-paid player (behind Walter Payton). Hampton signed three one-year contracts worth about $1 million (including bonuses), an average of about $333,000 per year. "Dan will be the highest paid defensive lineman in the league this year," said Jim Steiner, Hampton's agent. "I'm very happy," said Hampton. "I'm glad to have the contract behind me so I can concentrate on training camp. I'm optimistic about this season and I didn't want to miss any of the fun."

Hampton didn't miss out on the fun. He was voted the NFLPA NFC Defensive Lineman of the Year in 1984 along with being consensus All-Pro and made his third Pro Bowl. Hampton also tied his own career-best of 11½ sacks in 1984. The Bears' defense was the tops in the league in 1984 and he was part of the defense that set the NFL record for most sacks in a season, with 72, and is the co-holder of the record for most sacks in a game with 12. The latter occurred against the Detroit Lions on December 16, 1984. Earlier in that season the Bears sacked Minnesota Vikings quarterback Archie Manning 11 times, to tie the record for the second-most sacks in a game.

During the middle of the Bears 1985 Super Bowl run, Hampton signed a 4-year contract extension. On November 8, 1985, he signed a four-year deal worth $2.7 million. Hampton became the fifth highest-paid defensive lineman in the NFL when the contract began in 1986 with an estimated salary of $625,000. Hampton was making $325,000 during the 1985 season. Also in the middle of 1985 Hampton moved from right defensive tackle to left defensive end, allowing William Perry to move into the starting lineup. Also that season, Hampton, feeling the "Bears Super Bowl Shuffle" was too cocky, declined involvement.

Sports Illustrated's Paul Zimmerman relates an anecdote that when he picked fellow Bear DT Steve McMichael for his All-Pro team in 1985 he was chided a year later by Buddy Ryan, then the head coach of the Philadelphia Eagles. Ryan told Zimmerman that he was disappointed in him and that he thought Zimmerman knew football. He then pulled out Bears films and showed Zimmerman that "Hampton was the cornerstone to our 46 defense by drawing constant double teams". That year, he also was credited for inventing the 'Gatorade dump" in which a coach is drenched with the drink after a victory, which was often credited with Harry Carson.

Hampton remained at left defensive end in 1986 and was a First-team All-Pro. However, in the Bears 46 defense he would line up as a nose tackle and when the Bears lined up in a nickel defense, Hampton would play right tackle. Late in the 1987 season, Mike Ditka moved Hampton back to defensive tackle (where he played from 1982 to 1984), where he remained throughout the rest of his career.

In his 1987 book "Fatso" Hall of Fame defensive tackle Art Donovan called Dan the best defensive lineman in the NFL and "the closest thing to Gino Marchetti I've seen". Hampton's play also caught the eye of John Madden, who named Hampton to his All-Madden team six times and to the 10th Anniversary All-Madden team.

=== Injuries ===
During his football career Hampton endured 11 knee surgeries (five on each knee) and had two more just after finishing his 12th NFL season in 1990. He is credited by the Chicago Bears as having 82 career sacks. He had a career-high of 11½ in both 1980 (as a DE) and 1984 (as DT). After his contract expired after 1989, Hampton signed a 1-year deal for $850,000 to play the 1990 season for the Bears. The final contract was incentive based, if Hampton played he got paid, if an injury forced him to the sidelines he would not. Hampton played 14 games—had he played all 16 he would have earned the full $1 million value of the contract. After the 1990 season Hampton was voted to the NFL All-Decade team of the 1980s.

Hampton, who missed 23 games in his career due to severe knee injures, was a positive force on the Bear defense. From 1983 to 1990, in games he missed, the Bears only won 33% of the time. In games he played they won 75%. When he was in the lineup the Bears sacked the quarterback 3.6 times a game and only 2.3 times a game without him. When Hampton played the defense gave up an average of 14 points a game and allowed 23 points a game in the games he missed, all seemingly remarkable statistics.

=== Retirement ===
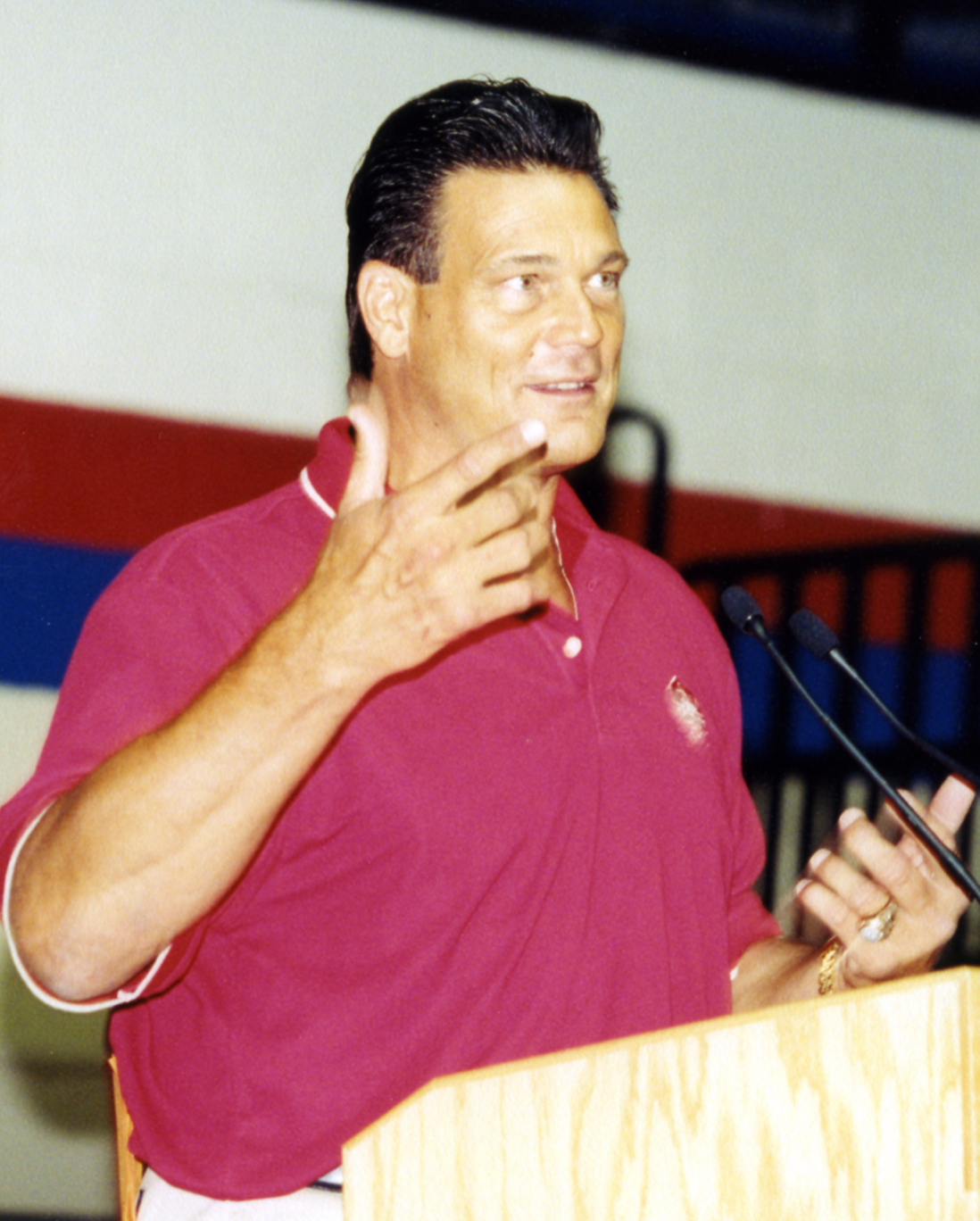
Dan Hampton delivering a speech in 2002

Dan Hampton retired from the Chicago Bears after the 1990 season. In 1990, he was the recipient of the George S. Halas Courage Award by the Pro Football Writers Association which is given to the player or coach who "has performed with abandon despite injury." Other winners over the years have been Robert Edwards, Dick Butkus, as well as others.

Hampton was selected to the Pro Football Hall of Fame in 2002. He was inducted with Washington Redskins head coach George Allen, Oakland Raiders tight end Dave Casper, Buffalo Bills quarterback Jim Kelly and Pittsburgh Steelers wide receiver John Stallworth.

== Post-NFL ==
Hampton is a co-host for the syndicated Pro Football Weekly television show which is approaching its 20th season on the air. The show is hosted by a panel, Pro Football Weekly publisher/editor Hub Arkush as well as Chicago sportscaster Pat Boyle, and former Bear Tom Waddle. Hampton was also a color commentator for NFL games on NBC in the early 1990s, and called XFL games for the network in 2001.

On May 22, 2002, Hampton was sentenced in Arkansas for his third DWI in six years. He received a sentence of one week in jail, a $1,000 fine, and was ordered to attend alcohol education courses. On November 20, 2021, Hampton was arrested in Winfield, Indiana on a charge of operating a vehicle while intoxicated. It was later reported that a toxicology report resulting from that arrest revealed a blood alcohol content of 0.189.

Hampton is part of a Miller Lite and Gridiron Greats promotion to raise funds for retired NFL players in need. He also participates in "One for the Kids" Annual Golf Tournament that raises funds for various charities that support children in the Chicago area. Hampton has also been a spokesperson for companies such as Chevrolet and Firestone.

Hampton is also renowned for coining various catch phrases, such as: "de facto cream-of-the-class, if you will," "throw it against the pallet to see what sticks," and "hit that town like Hurricane Katrina." He later apologized for his Katrina comment.
