= Steve Little (American football) =

American football player (1956–1999)

No. 12
- Positions: Kicker, Punter

Personal information
- Born: February 19, 1956; Springfield, Illinois, U.S
- Died: September 6, 1999 (aged 43); Little Rock, Arkansas, U.S
- Listed height: 6 ft 0 in (1.83 m)
- Listed weight: 180 lb (82 kg)

Career information
- High school: Shawnee Mission South (Overland Park, Kansas)
- College: Arkansas
- NFL draft: 1978: 1st round, 15th overall pick

Career history
- St. Louis Cardinals (1978–1980)

Awards and highlights
- Consensus All-American (1977); First-team All-American (1976); 2× First-team All-SWC (1975, 1977); NCAA record: Longest field goal made: 67 yards (tied) (Note: Kicked with tee) (Note: Also tied with Tom Odle from Fort Hays State (Division II))

Career NFL statistics
- Field goals attempted: 27
- Field goals made: 13
- Field goals percentage: 48.1%
- Extra points attempted: 51
- Extra points made: 41
- Extra points percentage: 80.4%
- Punts: 125
- Punting yards: 4,809
- Stats at Pro Football Reference

Steven Richard Little (February 19, 1956 – September 6, 1999) was an American professional football player who was a kicker and punter in the National Football League (NFL) for the St. Louis Cardinals. He is the third-highest drafted kicker in NFL history, behind Charlie Gogolak (6th, 1966) of Princeton and Russell Erxleben (11th, 1979) of Texas. Little was drafted higher than future NFL greats Ozzie Newsome and Todd Christensen.

Little was an All-American placekicker and punter during his years at the University of Arkansas in Fayetteville. He kicked an NCAA record-tying 67-yard field goal on October 15, 1977. That record has yet to be broken; it was set by Erxleben two weeks earlier on October 1, 1977, and is shared with Joe Williams of Wichita State (October 21, 1978).

== Early life and college ==
Little played high school football for Shawnee Mission South High School in Overland Park, Kansas, where he was an all-state quarterback and defensive back. He was recruited to play football for the University of Arkansas by legendary Arkansas head coach Frank Broyles. Broyles later said that he initially recruited Little to play quarterback since Joe Ferguson had recently graduated and entered the NFL. However Little's kicking abilities so impressed Broyles that they utilized him in that position. Also coach Bo Rein had recently accepted an assistant coaching position with Arkansas, and was bringing with him high school standout quarterback Ron Calcagni.

In 1975, Little helped Arkansas in its defeat of Georgia in the Cotton Bowl. In 1977, he earned All-America honors and kicked a still-standing NCAA D-I record 67-yard field goal against Texas on Oct. 15th. He helped the Razorbacks to an upset victory in the Orange Bowl over Oklahoma. During Little's career with Arkansas, the Razorbacks went 10–2 in 1975, 5–5–1 in 1976, and 11–1 in 1977. During his final year at Arkansas Little played under head coach Lou Holtz.

== Professional career ==
Little was selected in the first round with the 15th overall pick in the 1978 NFL draft by the St. Louis Cardinals. Despite the anticipation surrounding his kicking skills demonstrated in college, he performed at a dismal level as a professional. Little served as both punter and placekicker; in his brief 33-game NFL career, he punted for a total of 4,809 yards, but had a disappointing field goal percentage of 48.1% over less than three seasons. He did kick a 51-yard field goal, the fifth-longest in Cardinals history, but also missed ten extra points in 51 attempts. Little's problems off the field also caused him issues with the team; with a new head coach in 1980, he was released six games into the season on October 16, replaced by kicker Neil O'Donoghue.

Hours after his release by the Cardinals, Little was involved in a high-speed single car accident that saw his car hydroplane and slam into a signpost on Interstate 270 at Ladue Road; reportedly, he had been drinking at the time of the crash. The accident broke his neck and left him a quadriplegic. Little died in 1999 at age 43, having spent years as a quadriplegic in hospice in Little Rock, Arkansas, where he lived with and was cared for by his brother Gene Little. Little is on the All-Century team at Arkansas, and is also listed as #11 on the list of greatest Arkansas football players of all time.
