= Lou Holtz =

American college football coach (1937–2026)

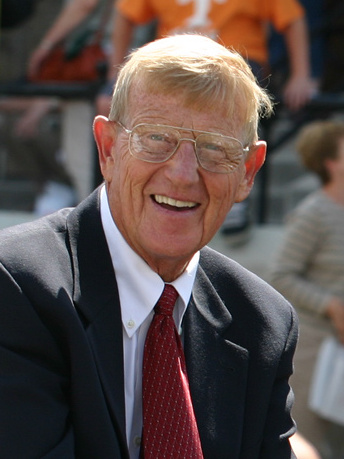
- Holtz in 2007

Biographical details
- Born: January 6, 1937; Follansbee, West Virginia, U.S.
- Died: March 4, 2026 (aged 89); Orlando, Florida, U.S.

Playing career
- 1956–1957: Kent State
- Position: Linebacker

Coaching career (HC unless noted)
- 1960: Iowa (assistant)
- 1961–1963: William & Mary (assistant)
- 1964–1965: Connecticut (assistant)
- 1966–1967: South Carolina (assistant)
- 1968: Ohio State (assistant)
- 1969–1971: William & Mary
- 1972–1975: NC State
- 1976: New York Jets
- 1977–1983: Arkansas
- 1984–1985: Minnesota
- 1986–1996: Notre Dame
- 1999–2004: South Carolina

Head coaching record
- Overall: 249–132–7 (college); 3–10 (NFL)
- Bowls: 12–8–2

Accomplishments and honors

Championships
- National (1988); SoCon (1970); ACC (1973); SWC (1979)

Awards
- 2× Paul "Bear" Bryant Award (1977, 1988); 2× Eddie Robinson Coach of the Year (1977, 1988); 2× Sporting News College Football COY (1977, 1988); Walter Camp Coach of the Year Award (1977); 2× Woody Hayes Trophy (1977, 1988); ACC Coach of the Year (1972); SWC Coach of the Year (1979); SEC Coach of the Year (2000); Presidential Medal of Freedom (2020)
- College Football Hall of Fame; Inducted in 2008 (profile)

Louis Leo Holtz (January 6, 1937 – March 4, 2026) was an American college football coach. He served as the head football coach at the College of William & Mary (1969–1971), North Carolina State University (1972–1975), the New York Jets (1976), the University of Arkansas (1977–1983), the University of Minnesota (1984–1985), the University of Notre Dame (1986–1996), and the University of South Carolina (1999–2004), compiling a career college head coaching record of 249–132–7.

Holtz's 1988 Notre Dame team went 12–0 with a victory in the Fiesta Bowl and was the consensus national champion. Holtz is the only college football coach to lead six different programs to bowl games and the only coach to guide four different programs to the final top 15 rankings. After retiring from coaching, Holtz worked as a TV college football analyst for CBS Sports in the 1990s and ESPN from 2005 until 2015. Holtz was elected to the College Football Hall of Fame in 2008.

== Early life ==
Holtz was born on January 6, 1937, in Follansbee, West Virginia, the son of Anne Marie (Tychonievich) and Andrew Holtz, a bus driver. His father was of German and Irish descent, while his maternal grandparents were emigrants from Chernobyl, Ukraine.

He grew up in East Liverpool, Ohio, and graduated from East Liverpool High School in 1954. He then attended Kent State University, where he was a member of the Delta Upsilon fraternity and was a walk-on for the Kent State football team. He worked part-time at the East Liverpool Review to afford attending college. Holtz also trained under Kent State's U.S. Army Reserve Officers' Training Corps and earned a commission as a Field Artillery Officer in the United States Army Reserve. Holtz graduated in 1959 with a bachelor's degree in history. He then received a master's degree in arts and education from the University of Iowa in 1961.

== Career ==
Holtz began his coaching career in 1960 as a graduate assistant at Iowa, where he received his master's degree. From there, he made stops as an assistant at William & Mary (1961–1963), Connecticut (1964–1965), South Carolina (1966–1967) and Ohio State (1968). The 1968 Ohio State team won a national championship with Holtz as an assistant.

=== William & Mary ===
Holtz's first job as head coach came in 1969 at the College of William & Mary, who played in the Southern Conference at that time. He led the 1970 William & Mary Indians (now Tribe) to the Southern Conference title and a berth in the Tangerine Bowl.

=== North Carolina State ===
In 1972, Holtz moved to North Carolina State University and had a 33–12–3 record in four seasons. His first three teams achieved final Top 20 rankings including a final Top 10 finish in the 1974 Coaches Poll. His 1973 team won the ACC Championship. His Wolfpack teams played in four bowl games, going 2–1–1. Following the 1975 season, Holtz accepted an offer to leave college football and become the head coach of the NFL's New York Jets.

=== New York Jets ===
Holtz's lone foray into the NFL professional ranks began when he was appointed head coach of the New York Jets on February 10, 1976. He was selected over Johnny Majors, Darryl Rogers, and Marv Levy. Holtz resigned ten months later on December 9 with the Jets at 3–10 and one game remaining in the 1976 season. Upon his departure, he lamented, "God did not put Lou Holtz on this earth to coach in the pros."

=== Arkansas ===
Holtz went to the University of Arkansas as the new head football coach in 1977. In his seven years there, the Razorbacks compiled a 60–21–2 record and reached six bowl games. In his first season at Arkansas, he led the 1977 Razorbacks to a berth in the 1978 Orange Bowl against the Oklahoma Sooners, then coached by University of Arkansas alumnus Barry Switzer. The Sooners were in position to win their third national championship in four seasons after top-ranked Texas lost earlier in the day to fifth-ranked Notre Dame in the Cotton Bowl Classic. Arkansas' chances looked slim after the team lost several key personnel just before the game. In one of his last practices, All-American guard, Leotis Harris suffered a season-ending injury, and only a couple of days later Holtz suspended both starting running backs, Ben Cowins and Michael Forrest, and top receiver, Donny Bobo, for disciplinary reasons. However, behind an Orange Bowl record of 205 yards rushing from reserve running back Roland Sales the Hogs defeated the Sooners, 31–6. That team was recognized by the Rothman (FACT) poll as co-national champions, along with Texas and Notre Dame for 1977. Holtz was widely considered to be the leading candidate to replace Woody Hayes at Ohio State in 1979, but Holtz did not pursue the job because he did not want to follow Hayes.

After a 9-2-1 record with the 1978 Razorbacks and a tie in the 1978 Fiesta Bowl against UCLA, Holtz led the 1979 Razorbacks to a 10–2 record and a share of the SWC championship in 1979. His 1980 team slipped to 7-5 but beat Tulane in the Hall of Fame Classic, and his 1981 squad finished 8-4 after losing to North Carolina in the Gator Bowl. Holtz and his 1982 Hogs finished with a 9-2-1 record after a Bluebonnet Bowl victory over Florida.

Holtz was then dismissed following a 6–5 1983 campaign. At the time, athletic director Frank Broyles stated that Holtz had resigned because he was "tired and burned out", and was not fired. When the university was sued in 2004 in a federal discrimination lawsuit involving Nolan Richardson, Broyles testified about his practices as athletic director that cited Holtz's firing as an example, stating that he had fired Holtz because he was losing the fan base with things he said and did. Holtz confirmed that he had been fired, but that Broyles never gave him a reason, although reports cited his political involvement as a major reason: controversy arose over his having taped two television advertisements from his coach's office endorsing the re-election of Jesse Helms as Senator from North Carolina at a time when Helms was leading the effort to block Martin Luther King Jr. Day from becoming a national holiday.

=== Minnesota ===
Holtz accepted the head coaching job at the University of Minnesota before the 1984 season. The 1983 Golden Gophers had only won one game vs. Rice in 1983, but under Holtz 1984 team won four games including 3 in the Big Ten. The 1985 team was 7-5 and were invited to the 1985 Independence Bowl, where they defeated Clemson, 20–13. Holtz did not coach the Gophers in that bowl game, as he had already accepted the head coaching position at Notre Dame. His contract purportedly included a "Notre Dame clause" that allowed him to leave if that coaching job were to become available.

Holtz's tenure at Minnesota was not without controversy. Just prior to the 1991 Orange Bowl, the NCAA implicated the Holtz-era Golden Gophers for recruiting violations. Sanctions handed down in March 1991 included a bowl ban in 1992 for the Golden Gophers and "two more years ... [of] continued probation".

=== Notre Dame ===
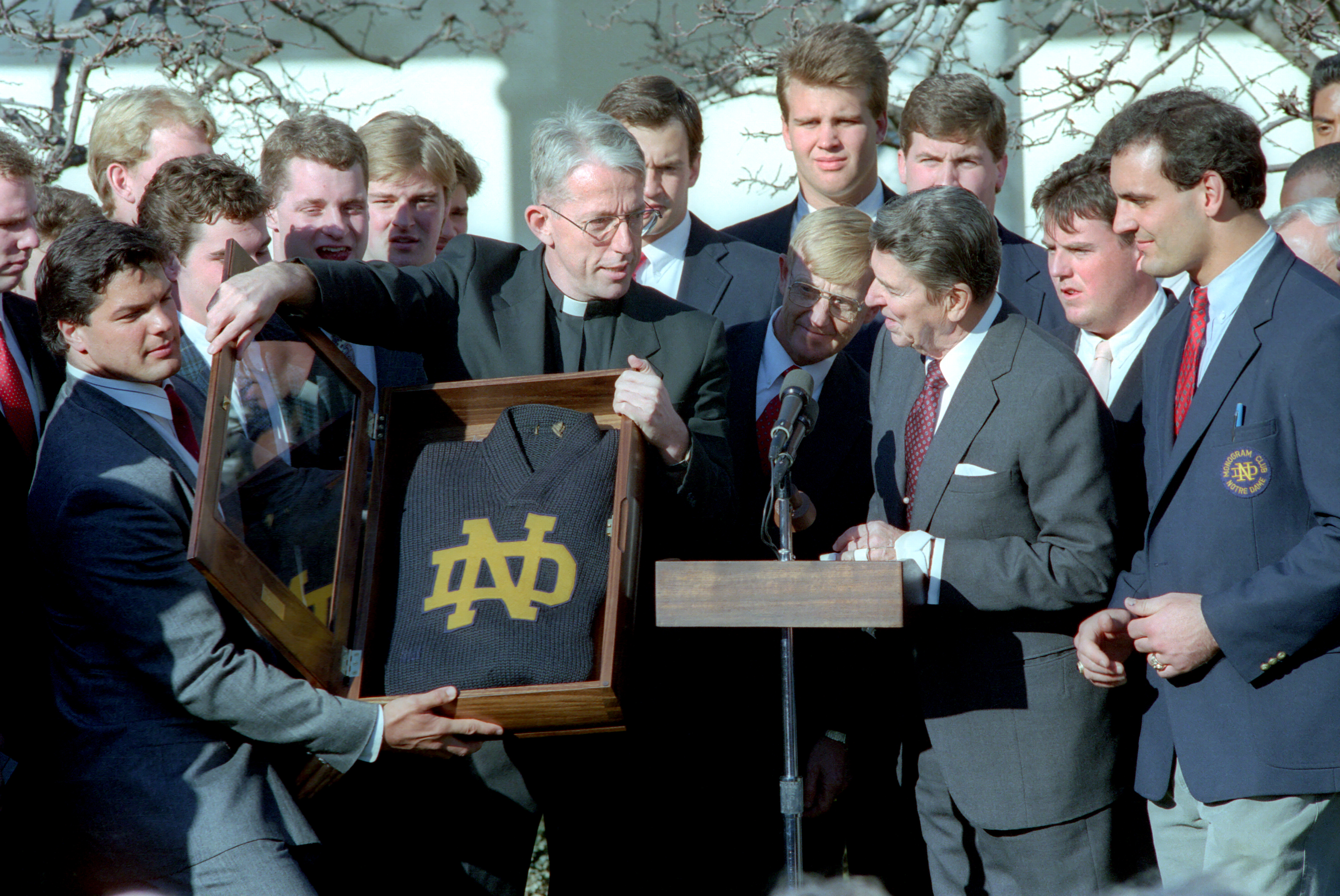
Holtz and the 1988 Notre Dame Fighting Irish football team with President Ronald Reagan

In 1986, Holtz left Minnesota to take over the then-struggling Notre Dame Fighting Irish football program. A taskmaster and strict disciplinarian, Holtz had the names removed from the backs of the players' jerseys when he took over at Notre Dame, wanting to emphasize team effort. With the exception of select bowl games, names have not been included on Notre Dame's jerseys since. Although his 1986 squad posted an identical 5–6 mark to the one that the 1985 edition had, five of their six losses were by a combined total of 14 points. In the season finale against their archrival USC Trojans, Notre Dame overcame a 17-point fourth-quarter deficit and pulled out a 38–37 win.

In his second season, Holtz led the 1987 Fighting Irish to an appearance in the 1988 Cotton Bowl Classic, where the Irish lost to the Texas A&M Aggies, 35–10. The following year (1988), Notre Dame won all eleven of their regular season games and defeated the third-ranked West Virginia Mountaineers 34–21 in the Fiesta Bowl, claiming the national championship. During that season, on October 15, Notre Dame upset the top-ranked Miami Hurricanes, ending their 36-game regular season game winning streak, in what is widely known as the "Catholics vs. Convicts" game. The game is considered one of the most memorable games in all of college football history.

The 1989 squad also won their first eleven games (and in the process set a school record with a 23-game winning streak) and were the No. 1 team until losing to Miami in the season finale. A 21–6 win over No. 1 Colorado in the Orange Bowl gave the Irish a second-place ranking in the final standings, as well as back-to-back 12-win seasons for the first time in school history.

Holtz's 1993 Irish team ended the season with an 11–1 record and ranked second in the final AP poll. Although the Florida State Seminoles were defeated by the Irish in a battle of unbeatens during the regular season and both teams had only one loss at season's end (Notre Dame lost to seventeenth-ranked Boston College), FSU was then voted national champion in the final 1993 AP and Coaches Poll. Between 1988 and 1993, Holtz's teams posted an overall 64–9–1 record. He also took the Irish to bowl games for nine consecutive seasons, still a Notre Dame record.

Following an investigation in 1999, the NCAA placed Notre Dame on two years probation for extra benefits provided to football players between 1993 and 1999 by Kim Dunbar, a South Bend bookkeeper involved in a $1.4 million embezzlement scheme at her employer, as well as one instance of academic fraud that occurred under Holtz's successor, Bob Davie. The NCAA found that Holtz and members of his staff learned of the violations but failed to make appropriate inquiry or to take prompt action, finding Holtz's efforts "inadequate".

Occasionally, despite his lack of success with the New York Jets, he was rumored to be leaving Notre Dame for the NFL. Following a 6–10 season in 1990 and an 8–8 showing in 1991, the Minnesota Vikings were rumored to be going to replace Jerry Burns with Holtz. However, Holtz denied these rumors each of those two seasons. Holtz remained at Notre Dame; the Vikings, meanwhile, hired Dennis Green to replace the retired Jerry Burns.

On September 13, 2008, Lou Holtz was invited back to the campus where a statue of the former coach was unveiled. The ceremony took place during the weekend of the Notre Dame–Michigan game.

==== First retirement ====
Lou Holtz left Notre Dame after the 1996 season. He compiled a record of 100–32–2, which was second in career victories at Notre Dame, behind Knute Rockne (both were surpassed by Brian Kelly until 21 of his wins were vacated by the NCAA due to academic misconduct). He also led Notre Dame to nine consecutive major bowl games, winning five of them.

In 1996, two members of the Minnesota Vikings ownership board, Wheelock Whitney and Jaye F. Dyer, reportedly contacted Holtz. They wanted to bring him in to replace Dennis Green. Of the rumors surrounding the reasons for Holtz's retirement, one of them was the possible Vikings head coaching position.

=== South Carolina ===
After two seasons as a commentator for CBS Sports, Holtz came out of retirement in 1999 and returned to the University of South Carolina, where he had been an assistant in the 1960s. The year before Holtz arrived, the Gamecocks went 1–10, and the team subsequently went 0–11 during Holtz's first season. In his second season, South Carolina went 8–4, winning the Outback Bowl over the heavily favored Ohio State Buckeyes. The eight-game improvement from the previous year was the best in the nation in 2000 and the third best single-season turnaround in NCAA history. It also earned National Coach of the Year honors for Holtz from Football News and American Football Coaches Quarterly. In his third season, Holtz's success continued, leading the Gamecocks to a 9–3 record and another Outback Bowl victory over Ohio State. The nine wins for the season were the second highest total in the history of the program. Under Holtz's leadership, the Gamecocks posted their best two-year mark in school history from 2000 to 2001, going 17–7 overall and 10–6 in SEC play.

After consecutive 5–7 campaigns in 2002 and 2003, Holtz finished his South Carolina tenure on a winning note with a 6–5 record in 2004. Holtz's time in Columbia saw the resurrection of Gamecock Football.

In 2005, the NCAA imposed three years probation and reductions in two scholarships on the program for ten admitted violations under Holtz, five of which were found to be major. The violations involved improper tutoring and off-season workouts, as well as a lack of institutional control. No games were forfeited, nor was a television or post-season ban imposed. Holtz issued a statement after the sanctions were announced stating, "There was no money involved. No athletes were paid. There were no recruiting inducements. No cars. No jobs offered. No ticket scandal."

==== Second retirement ====
On November 18, 2004, Holtz announced that he would retire at the end of the season. On November 20, 2004, a major brawl took place during Holtz's last regular season game against Clemson. Instead of ending his career at a post-season bowl game, which was expected, the two universities announced that each would penalize their respective football programs for their unsportsmanlike conduct by declining any bowl game invitations. At his last press conference as South Carolina's coach, Holtz said "Isn't it a heck of a note, Lou Holtz is going to be remembered along with Woody Hayes for having a fight at the Clemson game".

=== Broadcasting ===
Holtz worked for CBS Sports as a college football analyst and in the same capacity for the cable network ESPN. He worked on the secondary studio team, located in Bristol, Connecticut as opposed to the game site. He typically appeared on pregame, halftime, and postgame shows of college football games. In addition, he appeared on College Football Scoreboard, College Football Final, College Football Live, SportsCenter, and the occasional game. He typically partnered with Rece Davis and Mark May. Holtz came under scrutiny after referencing Adolf Hitler in an on-air comment while appearing on College Football Live in 2008. In his analysis of Michigan Wolverines head coach Rich Rodriguez, Holtz stated sarcastically, "Ya know, Hitler was a great leader, too." The next day, Holtz apologized for the comment during halftime of a game between Clemson and Georgia Tech. On April 12, 2015, it was reported by SB Nation that Holtz was leaving ESPN.

== Personal life ==
Holtz was married to Beth Barcus from July 22, 1961, until her death from cancer on June 30, 2020. At the time of his death, Holtz resided in Lake Nona Golf & Country Club in Orlando, Florida. He and Beth had four children together, three of whom are Notre Dame graduates. One of his sons, Skip, is also a football coach.

He was on the Catholic Advisory Board of Ave Maria Mutual Funds and also a member at the Augusta National Golf Club in Augusta, Georgia. On June 23, 2015, Holtz's Lake Nona home was damaged by a house fire that was most likely triggered by a lightning strike.

On January 30, 2026, a family member of Holtz announced that he entered end-of-life hospice care in Orlando. On March 4, Holtz died at the age of 89. He was interred in Cedar Grove Cemetery at the University of Notre Dame.

=== Political views ===
Holtz was long active in Republican Party politics, including his support for Jesse Helms, hosting former Vice President Dan Quayle during a 1999 fundraising tour, speaking at a 2007 House Republicans strategy meeting, and considering entering the Republican primary for a congressional seat in Florida in 2009. However, he also made a contribution of $2,300 to the campaign of Democratic Party presidential candidate Hillary Clinton in 2008. In 2016, Holtz endorsed Donald Trump for president. In 2020, Holtz voiced his support for former University of Notre Dame professor and alumna Amy Coney Barrett's nomination to the United States Supreme Court.

On August 26, 2020, Holtz spoke at the Republican National Convention endorsing Donald Trump for re-election. During his address at the 2020 Republican National Convention, Holtz said that Democratic presidential nominee Joe Biden was "a Catholic in name only." The University of Notre Dame also released a statement the following day to distance itself from Holtz's comment regarding Biden.

Holtz was vocal about his disapproval of Colin Kaepernick taking a knee during the United States national anthem before NFL games and NFL commissioner Roger Goodell allowing players to do so. Holtz told Scoop B Radio's Brandon "Scoop B" Robinson that players should go to inner city neighborhoods and be influential in their community rather than kneeling.

=== Popular culture ===
Holtz appeared as himself in a Discover Card commercial in November 2011. Holtz also played himself in the movie The Blind Side.

== Honors ==
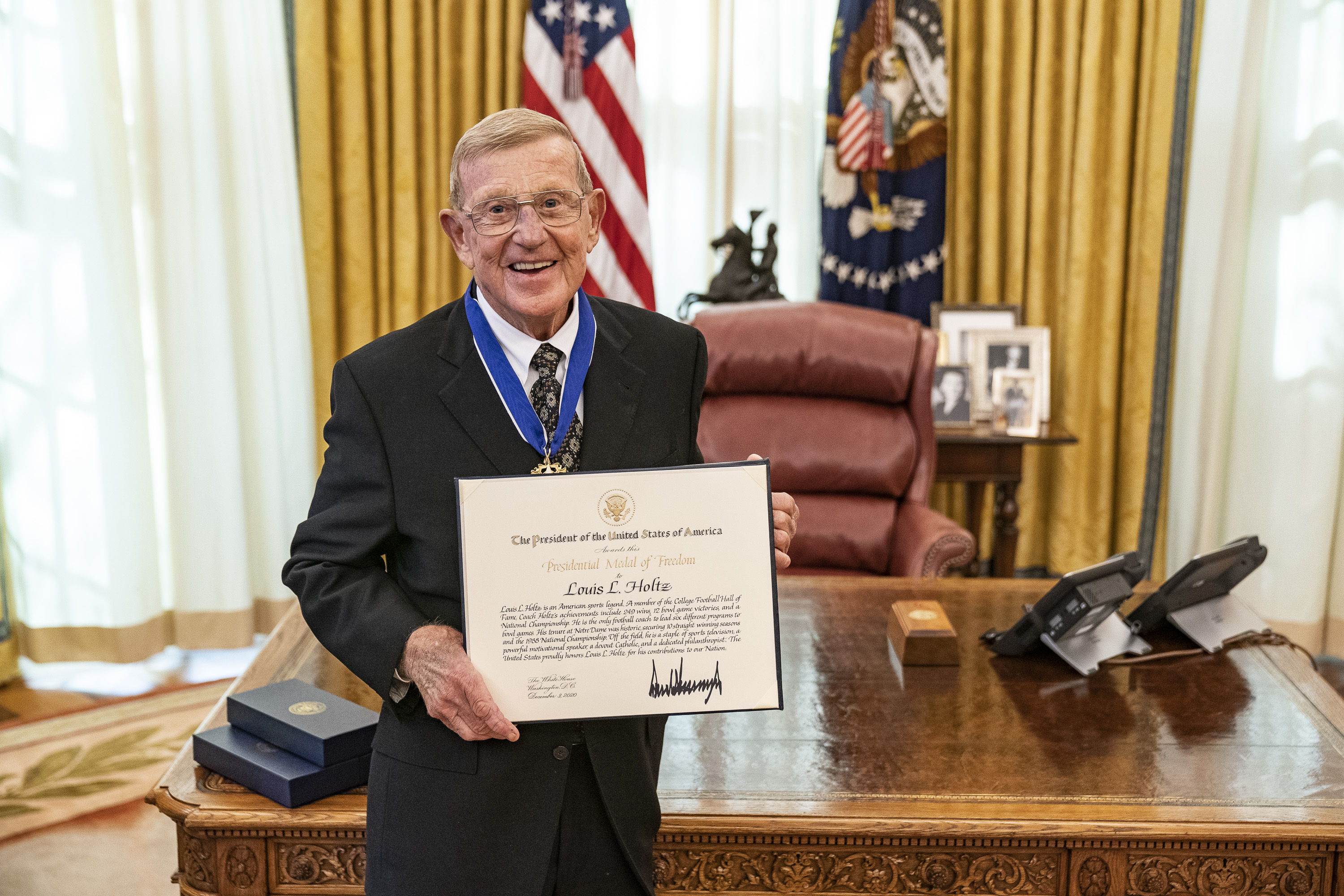
Holtz receiving the Presidential Medal of Freedom in 2020

Holtz was elected to the College Football Hall of Fame in 2008. He was awarded the Presidential Medal of Freedom by President Donald Trump on December 3, 2020. Holtz was also elected to the Arkansas Sports Hall of Fame in 1983 and the Cotton Bowl Hall of Fame in 2012. He received the Golden Plate Award of the American Academy of Achievement in 1990. The Upper Ohio Valley Museum & Learning Center at the Lou Holtz Hall of Fame was established in his hometown of East Liverpool, Ohio, which inducted him as part of its inaugural class in 1998.

Holtz was awarded numerous honorary degrees. He was presented an honorary Doctor of Laws from the University of Notre Dame on May 22, 2011. Holtz was also awarded an honorary Doctor of Education from the University of South Carolina on December 17, 2012. Holtz was awarded an honorary Doctor in Public Service from Trine University and elected to the board of trustees in 2011. Trine also honored Holtz in 2013 by naming a program the Lou Holtz Master of Science in Leadership Program. He was also presented an honorary Doctorate in Communications from Franciscan University of Steubenville on May 9, 2015, and delivered a commencement address. He did the same at Christendom College in 2021, receiving the Pro Deo et Patria Award for Distinguished Service to God and Country.

== Head coaching record ==
=== College ===
Year	Team	Overall	Conference	Standing	Bowl/playoffs	Coaches^{#}	AP^{°}
William & Mary Indians (Southern Conference) (1969–1971)
1969	William & Mary	3–7	2–2	4th			
1970	William & Mary	5–7	3–1	1st	L Tangerine		
1971	William & Mary	5–6	4–1	2nd			
William & Mary:		13–20	9–4				
NC State Wolfpack (Atlantic Coast Conference) (1972–1975)
1972	NC State	8–3–1	4–1–1	2nd	W Peach		17
1973	NC State	9–3	6–0	1st	W Liberty		16
1974	NC State	9–2–1	4–2	2nd	T Astro-Bluebonnet	9	11
1975	NC State	7–4–1	2–2–1	4th	L Peach		
NC State:		33–12–3	16–5–2				
Arkansas Razorbacks (Southwest Conference) (1977–1983)
1977	Arkansas	11–1	7–1	2nd	W Orange	3	3
1978	Arkansas	9–2–1	6–2	2nd	T Fiesta	10	11
1979	Arkansas	10–2	7–1	T–1st	L Sugar	9	8
1980	Arkansas	7–5	3–5	6th	W Hall of Fame Classic		
1981	Arkansas	8–4	5–3	4th	L Gator	16	
1982	Arkansas	9–2–1	5–2–1	3rd	W Astro-Bluebonnet	8	9
1983	Arkansas	6–5	4–4	5th			
Arkansas:		60–21–2	37–18–1				
Minnesota Golden Gophers (Big Ten Conference) (1984–1985)
1984	Minnesota	4–7	3–6	8th			
1985	Minnesota	6–5	4–4	6th	Independence (Note: Holtz left Minnesota for Notre Dame before the Independence Bowl, which was coached by John Gutekunst.)		
Minnesota:		10–12	7–10				
Notre Dame Fighting Irish (Independent) (1986–1996)
1986	Notre Dame	5–6					
1987	Notre Dame	8–4			L Cotton		17
1988	Notre Dame	12–0			W Fiesta	1	1
1989	Notre Dame	12–1			W Orange	3	2
1990	Notre Dame	9–3			L Orange	6	6
1991	Notre Dame	10–3			W Sugar	12	13
1992	Notre Dame	10–1–1			W Cotton^{†}	4	4
1993	Notre Dame	11–1			W Cotton^{†}	2	2
1994	Notre Dame	6–5–1			L Fiesta^{†}		
1995	Notre Dame	9–3			L Orange^{†}	13	11
1996	Notre Dame	8–3				21	19
Notre Dame:		100–30–2					
South Carolina Gamecocks (Southeastern Conference) (1999–2004)
1999	South Carolina	0–11	0–8	6th (Eastern)			
2000	South Carolina	8–4	5–3	2nd (Eastern)	W Outback	21	19
2001	South Carolina	9–3	5–3	3rd (Eastern)	W Outback	13	13
2002	South Carolina	5–7	3–5	4th (Eastern)			
2003	South Carolina	5–7	2–6	4th (Eastern)			
2004	South Carolina	6–5	4–4	3rd (Eastern)			
South Carolina:		33–37	19–29				
Total:		249–132–7					
National championship Conference title Conference division title or championship game berth
^{†}Indicates Bowl Coalition or Bowl Alliance bowl.; ^{#}Rankings from final Coaches Poll.; ^{°}Rankings from final AP Poll.; Source:

=== NFL ===
Team	Year	Regular season					Postseason			
Team	Year	Won	Lost	Ties	Win %	Finish	Won	Lost	Win %	Result
NYJ	1976	3	10	0	.231	4th in AFC East	–	–	–	–
Total		3	10	0	.231		–	–	–	
Overall total		3	10	0	.231	NFL Championships (0)				

== Publications ==
Holtz wrote or contributed to 10 books:

- Holtz, Lou (1974). The Grass Is Greener. [The author]. OCLC 41773996.
- Holtz, Lou; Dugan, Donald (1978). Holtz' Quotes. [s.l: s.n.] OCLC 4468721.
- Holtz, Lou (1978). The Offensive Side of Lou Holtz. [s.l: s.n.] OCLC 4851306.
- Holtz, Lou (1980). The Kitchen Quarterback. Little Rock, Arkansas: Parkin Prtng. Co. OCLC 6714133.
- Holtz, Lou; Heisler, John (1989). The Fighting Spirit: A Championship Season at Notre Dame. New York: Pocket Books. ISBN 978-0-671-67673-5. OCLC 20180739.
- Holtz, Lou (1998). Winning Every Day: The Game Plan for Success. New York: HarperBusiness. ISBN 978-0-88730-904-5. OCLC 39451210.
- Holtz, Lou; Carpenter, Monte (2002). Quotable Lou: The Wit, Wisdom, and Inspiration of Lou Holtz, College Football's Most Colorful and Engaging Coach. Nashville, Tenn: TowleHouse Pub. ISBN 978-1-931249-18-8. OCLC 49942729.
- Holtz, Lou (2002). A Teen's Game Plan for Life. Notre Dame, Ind: Sorin Books. ISBN 978-1-893732-53-7. OCLC 49519284.
- Alvarez, Barry; Lucas, Mike; Holtz, Lou; Patterson, James (2006). Don't Flinch: Barry Alvarez, the Autobiography : the Story of Wisconsin's All-Time Winningest Coach. Champaign, IL: KCI Sports Ventures. ISBN 978-0-9758769-7-8. OCLC 71325993.
- Holtz, Lou (2006). Wins, Losses, and Lessons: An Autobiography. New York: Wm. Morrow. ISBN 978-0-06-084080-8. OCLC 65165505.
- Holtz, Lou (2019). Three Rules for Living a Good Life: A Game Plan for After Graduation. Notre Dame: Ave Maria Press. ISBN 978-1-59471-906-6.

== See also ==
- List of college football career coaching wins leaders
- List of NFL head coaches
