= 2002 Arizona Cardinals season =

NFL team season

- Owner: Bill Bidwill
- Head coach: Dave McGinnis
- Home stadium: Sun Devil Stadium

Results
- Record: 5–11
- Division place: 4th NFC West
- Playoffs: Did not qualify
- Pro Bowlers: None

The 2002 Arizona Cardinals season was the franchise’s 83rd year with the National Football League (NFL), 15th season in Arizona and the second full season under head coach Dave McGinnis. It was Jake Plummer’s final season with the Cardinals as he went to the Denver Broncos in the 2003 off-season.

This was the Cardinals' first season in the NFC West. The realignment put the team in the same division as the Rams, which at the time played in the Cardinals' former home of St. Louis. The Cardinals thus played one game in their former city every year from this season until 2015, after which the Rams returned to the Los Angeles metropolitan area.

== Offseason ==
Additions	Subtractions
G Raleigh Roundtree (Chargers)	CB Corey Chavous (Vikings)
TE Freddie Jones (Chargers)	FS Pat Tillman (U. S. Army)
CB Duane Starks (Ravens)	

=== NFL draft ===
2002 Arizona Cardinals draft
Round	Pick	Player	Position	College	Notes
1	12	Wendell Bryant	Defensive Tackle	Wisconsin	
2	49	Levar Fisher	Linebacker	NC State	
3	81	Josh McCown	Quarterback	Sam Houston State	
3	98	Dennis Johnson	Defensive end	Kentucky	
4	113	Nate Dwyer	Defensive tackle	Kansas	
5	149	Jason McAddley	Wide Receiver	Alabama	
6	185	Josh Scobey	Running back	Kansas State	
7	223	Mike Banks	Tight end	Iowa State	
Made roster

=== Undrafted free agents ===
2002 undrafted free agents of note
Player	Position	College
Damien Anderson	Running back	Northwestern
Eric Joyce	Defensive back	Tennessee State
Preston Parsons	Quarterback	Northern Arizona
Jake Soliday	Wide receiver	Northern Iowa

=== Pat Tillman ===
In May 2002, eight months after the September 11, 2001, attacks and after completing the fifteen remaining games of the 2001 season which followed the attacks (at a salary of $512,000 per year), Pat Tillman turned down a contract offer of $3.6 million over three years from the Cardinals to enlist in the U.S. Army.

== Personnel ==
=== Staff ===
2002 Arizona Cardinals staff
Front office: President – Bill Bidwill; Vice president – Larry Wilson; Vice president and general counsel – Michael Bidwill; General manager – Bob Ferguson; Assistant to the president – Rod Graves; Head coaches: Head coach – Dave McGinnis; Offensive coaches: Offensive coordinator – Rich Olson; Quarterbacks – Geep Chryst; Running backs – Johnny Roland; Wide receivers – Jerry Sullivan; Tight ends – Pete Hoener; Offensive line – George Warhop; Assistant Off. Line/Off. Quality Control – Mike Devlin	Defensive coaches: Defensive coordinator – Larry Marmie; Defensive line – Joe Greene; Linebackers – Jeff FitzGerald; Defensive backs – Kevin Ramsey; Special teams coaches: Special teams – Hank Kuhlmann; Special Teams Assistant/Def. Quality Control – Stan Kwan; Strength and conditioning: Strength and conditioning – Bob Rogucki

=== Roster ===
2002 Arizona Cardinals roster
Quarterbacks (QB): 12 Josh McCown; 15 Preston Parsons; 16 Jake Plummer; Running backs (RB): 20 Damien Anderson; 34 Joel Makovicka FB; 39 Dennis McKinley FB; 25 Travis Prentice; 31 Marcel Shipp; Wide receivers (WR): 84 Arnold Jackson; 11 Kevin Kasper; 83 Jason McAddley; 19 Nate Poole; 18 Jake Soliday; Tight ends (TE): 80 Mike Banks; 87 Steve Bush; 85 Freddie Jones	Offensive linemen (OL): 67 Chris Dishman G; 64 Steven Grace C; 78 Kendrick Rogers T; 73 Raleigh Roundtree G; 70 L. J. Shelton T; 50 Jason Starkey C; 71 Teag Whiting G; 68 Tony Wragge G; Defensive linemen (DL): 94 Marcus Bell DT; 91 Wendell Bryant DT; 98 Russell Davis DT; 72 Nate Dwyer DT; 96 Dennis Johnson DE; 92 Barron Tanner DT; 93 Kyle Vanden Bosch DE; 97 Fred Wakefield DE	Linebackers (LB): 54 Trev Faulk OLB; 51 Greg Jones OLB; 57 Ronald McKinnon MLB; 58 Johnny Rutledge MLB; 55 Raynoch Thompson OLB; 56 LeVar Woods OLB; 53 Michael Young MLB; Defensive backs (DB): 36 David Barrett CB; 27 Nijrell Eason CB; 29 Quentin Harris FS; 21 Renaldo Hill CB; 42 Kwamie Lassiter FS; 41 Justin Lucas SS; 23 Coby Rhinehart CB; 22 Duane Starks CB; 44 Michael Stone FS; 24 Adrian Wilson SS; Special teams (ST): 6 Tim Duncan K; 7 Bill Gramatica K; 48 Nathan Hodel LS; 10 Scott Player P	Practice squad: 76 Tommy Moody G; 17 Ezekiel Parker WR; Reserve: 89 David Boston WR (IR); 95 Tom Burke DE (IR); 65 Anthony Clement T (IR); 75 Leonard Davis T (IR); 74 John Fina T (IR); 52 Levar Fisher LB (IR); 59 Rob Fredrickson LB (IR); 86 Bryan Gilmore WR (IR); 60 Mike Gruttadauria C (IR); 82 MarTay Jenkins WR (IR); 26 Thomas Jones RB (IR); 66 Pete Kendall G (IR); 69 Alton Moore DE (IR); 81 Frank Sanders WR (IR); 33 Josh Scobey RB (IR); 30 Anthony White RB (NF-Inj.); Rookies in italics 53 active, 16 reserve, 2 practice squad

== Regular season ==
=== Schedule ===
In the 2002 regular season, the Cardinals’ non-divisional, conference opponents were primarily from the NFC East, although they also played the Carolina Panthers from the NFC South, and the Detroit Lions from the NFC North. Their non-conference opponents were from the AFC West, the second consecutive season the Cardinals faced the AFC West.

Week	Date	Opponent	Result	Record	Venue	Attendance
1	September 8	at Washington Redskins	**L** 23–31	0–1	FedExField	85,140
2	September 15	at **Seattle Seahawks**	**W** 24–13	1–1	Seahawks Stadium	63,104
3	September 22	San Diego Chargers	**L** 15–23	1–2	Sun Devil Stadium	28,980
4	September 29	New York Giants	**W** 21–7	2–2	Sun Devil Stadium	30,014
5	October 6	at Carolina Panthers	**W** 16–13	3–2	Ericsson Stadium	72,286
6	Bye					
7	October 20	Dallas Cowboys	**W** 9–6 (OT)	4–2	Sun Devil Stadium	59,702
8	October 27	at **San Francisco 49ers**	**L** 28–38	4–3	3Com Park	67,173
9	November 3	**St. Louis Rams**	**L** 14–27	4–4	Sun Devil Stadium	47,819
10	November 10	**Seattle Seahawks**	**L** 6–27	4–5	Sun Devil Stadium	29,252
11	November 17	at Philadelphia Eagles	**L** 14–38	4–6	Veterans Stadium	64,990
12	November 24	Oakland Raiders	**L** 20–41	4–7	Sun Devil Stadium	58,814
13	December 1	at Kansas City Chiefs	**L** 0–49	4–8	Arrowhead Stadium	77,809
14	December 8	Detroit Lions	**W** 23–20 (OT)	5–8	Sun Devil Stadium	28,640
15	December 15	at **St. Louis Rams**	**L** 28–30	5–9	Edward Jones Dome	65,939
16	December 21	**San Francisco 49ers**	**L** 14–17	5–10	Sun Devil Stadium	44,051
17	December 29	at Denver Broncos	**L** 7–37	5–11	Invesco Field at Mile High	75,164

Note: Intra-division opponents are in bold text.

=== Game summaries ===
==== Week 1: at Washington Redskins ====
Week 1: Arizona Cardinals at Washington Redskins – Game summary

Quarter	1	2	3	4	Total
Cardinals	10	3	3	7	**23**
**Redskins**	3	7	14	7	**31**

at FedEx Field, Landover, Maryland

- Date: September 8
- Game time: 1:05 p.m. EST/11:05 a.m. MST
- Game weather: 76 °F (24 °C)
- Game attendance: 85,140
- Referee: Tom White
- TV announcers (FOX): Pat Summerall, Brian Baldinger, Dave Feldman
- Box Score

Game information

**First quarter**

- WAS – Brett Conway 35-yard field goal, 8:41. Redskins 3–0.
- ARI – Bill Gramática 36-yard field goal, 2:59. Tied 3–3.
- ARI – Jake Plummer 7-yard run (Bill Gramática kick), 0:10. Cardinals 10–3.

**Second quarter**

- WAS – Kevin Lockett 26-yard pass from Shane Matthews (Brett Conway kick), 10:10. Tied 10–10.
- ARI – Bill Gramática 20-yard field goal, 3:13. Cardinals 13–10.

**Third quarter**

- WAS – Stephen Davis 3-yard run (Brett Conway kick), 9:51. Redskins 17–13.
- ARI – Bill Gramática 39-yard field goal, 8:14. Redskins 17–16.
- WAS – Rod Gardner 43-yard pass from Shane Matthews (Brett Conway kick), 6:28. Redskins 24–16.

**Fourth quarter**

- WAS – Derrius Thompson 17-yard pass from Shane Matthews (Brett Conway kick), 12:08. Redskins 31–16.
- ARI – David Boston 29-yard pass from Jake Plummer (Bill Gramática kick), 10:39. Redskins 31–23.

**Top passers**

- ARI – Jake Plummer – 14/36, 187 yards, TD, INT
- WAS – Shane Matthews – 28/40, 327 yards, 3 TD, INT

**Top rushers**

- ARI – Thomas Jones – 17 rushes, 54 yards
- WAS – Stephen Davis – 26 rushes, 104 yards, TD

**Top receivers**

- ARI – David Boston – 7 receptions, 138 yards, TD
- WAS – Rod Gardner – 7 receptions, 131 yards, TD

**Team** – pass – rush – total – to

- ARI – 187 – 70 – 257 – 1
- WAS – 327 – 122 – 442 – 1

==== Week 2: at Seattle Seahawks ====
Week 2: Arizona Cardinals (0–1) at Seattle Seahawks (0–1) – Game summary

Quarter	1	2	3	4	Total
**Cardinals**	3	0	7	14	**24**
Seahawks	3	7	0	3	**13**

at Seahawks Stadium, Seattle, Washington

- Date: September 15
- Game time: 1:05 p.m. PST/2:05 p.m. MST
- Game weather: 62 °F (17 °C)
- Game attendance: 63,104
- Referee: Tony Corrente
- TV announcers (Fox): Curt Menefee, Tim Ryan, Kevin McCabe
- Gamecenter, Gamebook, Box Score

Game information

**First quarter**

- SEA – Rian Lindell 46-yard field goal, 9:09. Seahawks 3–0.
- ARI – Bill Gramática 23-yard field goal, 3:05. Tied 3–3.

**Second quarter**

- SEA – Itula Mili 1-yard pass from Trent Dilfer (Rian Lindell kick), 4:10. Seahawks 10–3.

**Third quarter**

- ARI – Thomas Jones 58-yard run (Bill Gramática kick), 11:59. Tied 10–10.

**Fourth quarter**

- SEA – Rian Lindell 19-yard field goal, 12:52. Seahawks 13–10.
- ARI – MarTay Jenkins 95-yard kickoff return (Bill Gramática kick), 12:41. Cardinals 17–13.
- ARI – Frank Sanders 4-yard pass from Jake Plummer (Bill Gramática kick), 3:18. Cardinals 24–13.

**Top passers**

- ARI – Jake Plummer – 10/22, 107 yards, TD, INT
- SEA – Trent Dilfer – 29/47, 352 yards, TD

**Top rushers**

- ARI – Thomas Jones – 24 rushes, 173 yards, TD
- SEA – Shaun Alexander – 17 rushes, 37 yards

**Top receivers**

- ARI – David Boston – 4 receptions, 49 yards
- SEA – Darrell Jackson – 10 receptions, 174 yards

**Team** – pass – rush – total – to

- ARI – 98 – 249 – 347 – 1
- SEA – 345 – 81 – 426 – 1

==== Week 3: vs. San Diego Chargers ====
Week 3: San Diego Chargers (2–0) at Arizona Cardinals (1–1) – Game summary

Quarter	1	2	3	4	Total
**Chargers**	0	14	0	9	**23**
Cardinals	7	0	0	8	**15**

at State Farm Stadium, Glendale, Arizona

- Date: September 22
- Game time: 2:05 p.m. MDT
- Game weather: 100 °F (38 °C), relative humidity 10%, no wind
- Game attendance: 28,980
- Referee: Ed Hochuli
- TV announcers (CBS): Don Criqui and Steve Tasker
- Box score, Game Book

Game information

**First quarter**

- ARI – MarTay Jenkins 65-yard pass from Jake Plummer (Bill Gramatica kick), 10:11. Cardinals 7–0. **Drive: 3 plays, 71 yards, 1:30.**

**Second quarter**

- SDG – LaDainian Tomlinson 4-yard run (Steve Christie kick), 14:56. Tied 7–7. **Drive: 2 plays, 6 yards, 0:38.**
- SDG – LaDainian Tomlinson 2-yard run (Steve Christie kick), 5:03. Chargers 14–7. **Drive: 10 plays, 62 yards, 5:41.**

**Third quarter**

- No scoring plays.

**Fourth quarter**

- SDG – Punt blocked by Carlos Polk declared dead in end zone for a Safety, 14:44. Chargers 16–7.
- SDG – Donnie Edwards 20-yard interception return (Steve Christie kick), 11:23. Chargers 23–7.
- ARI – Marcel Shipp 31-yard pass from Jake Plummer (Jake Plummer–Frank Sanders pass), 9:30. Chargers 23–15. **Drive: 5 plays, 80 yards, 1:53.**

**Top passers**

- SDG – Drew Brees – 17/31, 181 yards, INT
- ARI – Jake Plummer – 16/36, 229 yards, 2 TD, 2 INT

**Top rushers**

- SDG – LaDainian Tomlinson – 26 rushes, 91 yards, 2 TD
- ARI – Thomas Jones – 17 rushes, 73 yards

**Top receivers**

- SDG – Curtis Conway – 7 receptions, 92 yards
- ARI – MarTay Jenkins – 2 receptions, 70 yards, TD

**Team** – pass – rush – total – to

- SDG – 181 – 125 – 289 – 1
- ARI – 229 – 97 – 297 – 3

==== Week 4: vs. New York Giants ====
Week 4: New York Giants (2–1) at Arizona Cardinals (1–2) – Game summary

Quarter	1	2	3	4	Total
Giants	7	0	0	0	**7**
**Cardinals**	0	7	0	14	**21**

at Sun Devil Stadium, Tempe, Arizona

- Date: September 29
- Game time: 2:05 p.m. MST
- Game weather: 90 °F (32 °C)
- Game attendance: 30,014
- Referee: Mike Carey
- TV announcers (FOX): Dick Stockton, Daryl Johnston, Ron Pitts
- Box Score

Game information

**First quarter**

- NYG – Tiki Barber 6-yard run (Matt Bryant kick), 8:38. Giants 7–0.

**Second quarter**

- ARI – Justin Lucas 38-yard interception run (Bill Gramática kick), 0:04. Tied 7–7.

**Third quarter**

- No scoring plays

**Fourth quarter**

- ARI – Marcel Shipp 7-yard pass from Jake Plummer (Bill Gramática kick), 10:36. Cardinals 14–7.
- ARI – Marcel Shipp 10-yard run (Bill Gramática kick), 2:13. Cardinals 21–7.

**Top passers**

- NYG – Kerry Collins – 19/36, 199 yards, INT
- ARI – Jake Plummer – 23/32, 168 yards, TD

**Top rushers**

- NYG – Tiki Barber – 13 rushes, 55 yards, TD
- ARI – Marcel Shipp – 17 rushes, 92 yards, TD

**Top receivers**

- NYG – Jeremy Shockey – 4 receptions, 56 yards
- ARI – Marcel Shipp – 5 receptions, 39 yards, TD

**Team** – pass – rush – total – to

- NYG – 199 – 67 – 263 – 3
- ARI – 168 – 102 – 263 – 1

==== Week 5: at Carolina Panthers ====
Week 5: Arizona Cardinals (2–2) at Carolina Panthers (3–1) – Game summary

Quarter	1	2	3	4	Total
**Cardinals**	0	6	0	10	**16**
Panthers	0	7	6	0	**13**

at Ericsson Stadium, Charlotte, North Carolina

- Date: October 6
- Game time: 1:00 p.m. PST/11:00 a.m. MST
- Game weather: 74 °F (23 °C)
- Game attendance: 72,286
- Referee: Bob McElwee
- TV announcers (FOX): Curt Menefee, Tim Ryan
- Box Score

Game information

**First quarter**

- No scoring plays

**Second quarter**

- ARI – Bill Gramática 41-yard field goal, 8:44. Cardinals 3–0.
- CAR – Isaac Byrd 31-yard pass from Rodney Peete (Shayne Graham kick), 1:58. Panthers 7–3.
- ARI – Bill Gramática 28-yard field goal, 0:16. Panthers 7–6.

**Third quarter**

- CAR – Shayne Graham 32-yard field goal, 8:52. Panthers 10–6.
- CAR – Shayne Graham 48-yard field goal, 1:29. Panthers 13–6.

**Fourth quarter**

- ARI – Freddie Jones 15-yard pass from Jake Plummer (Bill Gramática kick), 2:38. Tied 13–13.
- ARI – Bill Gramática 50-yard field goal, 0:16. Cardinals 16–13.

**Top passers**

- ARI – Jake Plummer – 18/40, 221 yards, TD, INT
- CAR – Rodney Peete – 20/34, 196 yards, TD, 2 INT

**Top rushers**

- ARI – Damien Anderson – 23 rushes, 61 yards
- CAR – Lamar Smith – 18 rushes, 49 yards

**Top receivers**

- ARI – Frank Sanders – 4 receptions, 70 yards
- CAR – Steve Smith Sr. – 5 receptions, 79 yards

**Team** – pass – rush – total – to

- ARI – 221 – 91 – 312 – 1
- CAR – 196 – 58 – 263 – 4

==== Week 7: vs. Dallas Cowboys ====
Week 7: Dallas Cowboys (3–3) at Arizona Cardinals (3–2) – Game summary

Quarter	1	2	3	4	OT	Total
Cowboys	0	0	6	0	0	**6**
**Cardinals**	3	3	0	0	3	**9**

at Sun Devil Stadium, Tempe, Arizona

- Date: October 20
- Game time: 2:15 p.m. MST
- Game weather: 81 °F (27 °C)
- Game attendance: 59,702
- Referee: Dick Hantak
- TV announcers (FOX): Pat Summerall, Brian Baldinger, Kevin McCabe
- Box Score

Game information

**First quarter**

- ARI – Bill Gramática 41-yard field goal, 10:50. Cardinals 3–0.

**Second quarter**

- ARI – Bill Gramática 23-yard field goal, 0:00. Cardinals 6–0.

**Third quarter**

- DAL – Antonio Bryant 78-yard pass from Quincy Carter (kick failed), 7:50. Tied 6–6.

**Fourth quarter**

- No scoring plays

**Overtime**

- ARI – Bill Gramática 40-yard field goal, 3:10. Cardinals 9–6.

**Top passers**

- DAL – Quincy Carter – 13/22, 202 yards, TD, 4 INT
- ARI – Jake Plummer – 23/46, 232 yards

**Top rushers**

- DAL – Emmitt Smith – 22 rushes, 82 yards
- ARI – Thomas Jones – 22 rushes, 68 yards

**Top receivers**

- DAL – Antonio Bryant – 3 receptions, 96 yards, TD
- ARI – David Boston – 6 receptions, 110 yards

**Team** – pass – rush – total – to

- DAL – 202 – 148 – 342 – 4
- ARI – 232 – 152 – 380 – 1

==== Week 8: at San Francisco 49ers ====
Week 8: Arizona Cardinals (4–2) at San Francisco 49ers (4–2) – Game summary

Quarter	1	2	3	4	Total
Cardinals	0	7	14	7	**28**
**49ers**	17	14	0	7	**38**

at 3Com Park, San Francisco, California

- Date: October 27
- Game time: 1:05 p.m. PST/2:05 p.m. MST
- Game weather: 62 °F (17 °C)
- Game attendance: 67,173
- Referee: Larry Nemmers
- TV announcers (FOX): Kenny Albert, Brian Baldinger
- Box Score

Game information

**First quarter**

- SF – José Cortez 45-yard field goal, 13:12. 49ers 3–0.
- SF – Terrell Owens 21-yard pass from Jeff Garcia (José Cortez kick), 7:19. 49ers 10–0.
- SF – Tai Streets 47-yard pass from Jeff Garcia (José Cortez kick), 4:13. 49ers 17–0.

**Second quarter**

- SF – Kevan Barlow 5-yard run (José Cortez kick), 14:05. 49ers 24–0.
- ARI – Marcel Shipp 7-yard run (Bill Gramática kick), 9:22. 49ers 24–7.
- SF – Terrell Owens 61-yard pass from Jeff Garcia (José Cortez kick), 0:12. 49ers 31–7.

**Third quarter**

- ARI – Jake Plummer 34-yard run (Bill Gramática kick), 11:18. 49ers 31–14.
- ARI – Marcel Shipp 11-yard run (Bill Gramática kick), 3:27. 49ers 31–21.

**Fourth quarter**

- SF – Kevan Barlow 9-yard pass from Jeff Garcia (José Cortez kick), 14:55. 49ers 38–21.
- ARI – Thomas Jones 7-yard run (Bill Gramática kick), 8:23. 49ers 38–28.

**Top passers**

- ARI – Jake Plummer – 24/36, 286 yards, 3 INT
- SF – Jeff Garcia – 18/28, 252 yards, 4 TD

**Top rushers**

- ARI – Thomas Jones – 15 rushes, 54 yards, TD
- SF – Kevan Barlow – 18 rushes, 51 yards, TD

**Top receivers**

- ARI – David Boston – 6 receptions, 83 yards
- SF – Terrell Owens – 8 receptions, 132 yards, 2 TD

**Team** – pass – rush – total – to

- ARI – 286 – 151 – 420 – 4
- SF – 252 – 105 – 357 – 0

==== Week 9: vs. St. Louis Rams ====
Week 9: St. Louis Rams (2–5) at Arizona Cardinals (4–3) – Game summary

Quarter	1	2	3	4	Total
**Rams**	7	10	0	10	**27**
Cardinals	0	7	0	7	**14**

at Sun Devil Stadium, Tempe, Arizona

- Date: November 3
- Game time: 2:15 p.m. MST
- Game weather: 76 °F (24 °C)
- Game attendance: 47,819
- Referee: Ron Blum
- TV announcers (FOX): Curt Menefee, Tim Ryan
- Box Score

Game information

**First quarter**

- STL – Ricky Proehl 31-yard pass from Marc Bulger (Jeff Wilkins kick), 11:18. Rams 7–0.

**Second quarter**

- STL – Jeff Wilkins 24-yard field goal, 13:09. Rams 10–0.
- ARI – Frank Sanders 8-yard pass from Jake Plummer (Bill Gramática kick), 2:31. Rams 10–7.
- STL – Torry Holt 7-yard pass from Marc Bulger (Jeff Wilkins kick), 0:53. Rams 17–7.

**Third quarter**

- No scoring plays

**Fourth quarter**

- ARI – Justin Lucas 35-yard interception run (Bill Gramática kick), 10:36. Rams 17–14.
- STL – Jeff Wilkins 42-yard field goal, 3:46. Rams 20–14.
- STL – Marshall Faulk 13-yard run (Jeff Wilkins kick), 1:53. Rams 27–14.

**Top passers**

- STL – Marc Bulger – 20/29, 245 yards, 2 TD, 2 INT
- ARI – Jake Plummer – 19/30, 193 yards, TD, INT

**Top rushers**

- STL – Marshall Faulk – 27 rushes, 178 yards, TD
- ARI – Thomas Jones – 12 rushes, 25 yards

**Top receivers**

- STL – Troy Edwards – 4 receptions, 63 yards
- ARI – Frank Sanders – 6 receptions, 67 yards, TD

**Team** – pass – rush – total – to

- STL – 245 – 192 – 415 – 2
- ARI – 193 – 64 – 235 – 3

==== Week 10: vs. Seattle Seahawks ====
Week 10: Seattle Seahawks (2–6) at Arizona Cardinals (4–4) – Game summary

Quarter	1	2	3	4	Total
**Seahawks**	10	17	0	0	**27**
Cardinals	3	3	0	0	**6**

at Sun Devil Stadium, Tempe, Arizona

- Date: November 10
- Game time: 2:05 p.m. MST
- Game weather: 76 °F (24 °C)
- Game attendance: 29,252
- Referee: Walt Coleman
- TV announcers (Fox): Curt Menefee, Tim Ryan, Brent Ringenbach
- Gamecenter, Gamebook, Box Score

Game information

**First quarter**

- SEA – Rian Lindell 23-yard field goal, 8:55. Seahawks 3–0.
- ARI – Bill Gramática 40-yard field goal, 6:04. Tied 3–3.
- SEA – Shaun Alexander 5-yard run (Rian Lindell kick), 3:16. Seahawks 10–3.

**Second quarter**

- SEA – Rian Lindell 30-yard field goal, 10:47. Seahawks 13–3.
- SEA – Ryan Hannam 16-yard pass from Matt Hasselbeck (Rian Lindell kick), 8:38. Seahawks 20–3.
- ARI – Bill Gramática 27-yard field goal, 3:50. Seahawks 20–6.
- SEA – Shaun Alexander 1-yard run (Rian Lindell kick), 0:16. Seahawks 27–6.

**Third quarter**

- No scoring plays

**Fourth quarter**

- No scoring plays

**Top passers**

- SEA – Matt Hasselbeck – 23/31, 260 yards, TD
- ARI – Jake Plummer – 17/29, 226 yards, 2 INT

**Top rushers**

- SEA – Maurice Morris – 15 rushes, 72 yards
- ARI – Marcel Shipp – 16 rushes, 85 yards

**Top receivers**

- SEA – Koren Robinson – 7 receptions, 96 yards
- ARI – Jason McAddley – 5 receptions, 113 yards

**Team** – pass – rush – total – to

- SEA – 255 – 151 – 406 – 0
- ARI – 226 – 111 – 337 – 5

==== Week 11: at Philadelphia Eagles ====
Week 11: Arizona Cardinals (4–5) at Philadelphia Eagles (6–3) – Game summary

Quarter	1	2	3	4	Total
Cardinals	7	7	0	0	**14**
**Eagles**	7	21	3	7	**38**

at Veterans Stadium, Philadelphia, Pennsylvania

- Date: November 17
- Game time: 1:05 p.m. EST/11:05 a.m. MST
- Game weather: 43 °F (6 °C)
- Game attendance: 64,990
- Referee: Bill Leavy
- TV announcers (FOX): Sam Rosen, Bill Maas
- Box Score

Game information

**First quarter**

- ARI – Jason McAddley 12-yard pass from Jake Plummer (Bill Gramática kick), 9:18. Cardinals 7–0.
- PHI – James Thrash 2-yard pass from Donovan McNabb (David Akers kick), 6:25. Tied 7–7.

**Second quarter**

- PHI – Dorsey Levens 3-yard pass from Donovan McNabb (David Akers kick), 9:56. Eagles 14–7.
- ARI – Joel Makovicka 2-yard pass from Jake Plummer (Bill Gramática kick), 7:43. Tied 14–14.
- PHI – Todd Pinkston 27-yard pass from Donovan McNabb (David Akers kick), 3:11. Eagles 21–14.
- PHI – Duce Staley 9-yard pass from Donovan McNabb (David Akers kick), 1:02. Eagles 28–14.

**Third quarter**

- PHI – David Akers 34-yard field goal, 5:55. Eagles 31–14.

**Fourth quarter**

- PHI – James Thrash 4-yard run (David Akers kick), 8:21. Eagles 38–14.

**Top passers**

- ARI – Jake Plummer – 20/35, 163 yards, 2 TD, INT
- PHI – Donovan McNabb – 20/25, 255 yards, 4 TD, INT

**Top rushers**

- ARI – Marcel Shipp – 9 rushes, 76 yards
- PHI – Duce Staley – 31 rushes, 135 yards

**Top receivers**

- ARI – Marcel Shipp – 5 receptions, 50 yards
- PHI – Duce Staley – 3 receptions, 82 yards, TD

**Team** – pass – rush – total – to

- ARI – 163 – 124 – 248 – 1
- PHI – 255 – 212 – 462 – 2

==== Week 12: vs. Oakland Raiders ====
Week 12: Oakland Raiders (6–4) at Arizona Cardinals (4–6) – Game summary

Quarter	1	2	3	4	Total
**Raiders**	14	7	17	3	**41**
Cardinals	0	14	0	6	**20**

at Sun Devil Stadium, Tempe, Arizona

- Date: November 24
- Game time: 2:05 p.m. MST
- Game weather: 75 °F (24 °C)
- Game attendance: 58,814
- Referee: Bill Carollo
- TV announcers (CBS): Kevin Harlan, Randy Cross, Beasley Reece
- Box Score

Game information

**First quarter**

- OAK – Jerry Porter 7-yard pass from Rich Gannon (Sebastian Janikowski kick), 8:51. Raiders 7–0.
- OAK – Charlie Garner 8-yard run (Sebastian Janikowski kick), 1:14. Raiders 14–0.

**Second quarter**

- ARI – Marcel Shipp 3-yard run (Bill Gramática kick), 13:53. Raiders 14–7.
- OAK – Jerry Porter 14-yard pass from Rich Gannon (Sebastian Janikowski kick), 5:31. Raiders 21–7.
- ARI – Joel Makovicka 1-yard pass from Jake Plummer (Bill Gramática kick), 1:08. Raiders 21–14.

**Third quarter**

- OAK – Tyrone Wheatley 2-yard run (Sebastian Janikowski kick), 9:45. Raiders 28–14.
- OAK – Jerry Rice 37-yard pass from Rich Gannon (Sebastian Janikowski kick), 5:02. Raiders 35–14.
- OAK – Sebastian Janikowski 37-yard field goal, 0:43. Raiders 38–14.

**Fourth quarter**

- ARI – Arnold Jackson 11-yard pass from Jake Plummer (pass failed), 1:08. Raiders 38–20.
- OAK – Sebastian Janikowski 51-yard field goal, 1:56. Raiders 41–20.

**Top passers**

- OAK – Rich Gannon – 27/45, 340 yards, 3 TD, INT
- ARI – Jake Plummer – 16/34, 145 yards, 2 TD, 2 INT

**Top rushers**

- OAK – Charlie Garner – 16 rushes, 100 yards, TD
- ARI – Marcel Shipp – 16 rushes, 135 yards, TD

**Top receivers**

- OAK – Jerry Rice – 7 receptions, 110 yards, TD
- ARI – Frank Sanders – 3 receptions, 55 yards

**Team** – pass – rush – total – to

- OAK – 340 – 187 – 520 – 1
- ARI – 145 – 132 – 263 – 3

==== Week 13: at Kansas City Chiefs ====
Week 13: Arizona Cardinals (4–7) at Kansas City Chiefs (5–6) – Game summary

Quarter	1	2	3	4	Total
Cardinals	0	0	0	0	**0**
**Chiefs**	14	21	7	7	**49**

at Arrowhead Stadium, Kansas City, Missouri

- Date: December 1
- Game time: 12:00 p.m. CST/11:00 a.m. MST
- Game weather: 44 °F (7 °C)
- Game attendance: 77,809
- Referee: Dick Hantak
- TV announcers (FOX): Sam Rosen, Bill Maas
- Box Score

Game information

**First quarter**

- KC – Priest Holmes 5-yard run (Morten Andersen kick), 1:27. Chiefs 7–0.
- KC – Dante Hall 90-yard punt return (Morten Andersen kick), 0:00. Chiefs 14–0.

**Second quarter**

- KC – Tony Richardson 3-yard run (Morten Andersen kick), 5:19. Chiefs 21–0.
- KC – Priest Holmes 2-yard run (Morten Andersen kick), 1:14. Chiefs 28–0.
- KC – Tony Gonzalez 23-yard pass from Trent Green (Morten Andersen kick), 0:07. Chiefs 35–0.

**Third quarter**

- KC – Marc Boerigter 1-yard pass from Trent Green (Morten Andersen kick), 3:53. Chiefs 42–0.

**Fourth quarter**

- KC – Marc Boerigter 29-yard pass from Trent Green (Morten Andersen kick), 7:57. Chiefs 49–0.

**Top passers**

- ARI – Jake Plummer – 14/31, 88 yards, 3 INT
- KC – Trent Green – 14/20, 209 yards, 2 TD

**Top rushers**

- ARI – Marcel Shipp – 14 rushes, 26 yards
- KC – Priest Holmes – 16 rushes, 113 yards, 2 TD

**Top receivers**

- ARI – Marcel Shipp – 7 receptions, 37 yards
- KC – Tony Gonzalez – 4 receptions, 74 yards, TD

**Team** – pass – rush – total – to

- ARI – 133 – 26 – 122 – 4
- KC – 266 – 216 – 477 – 1

==== Week 14: vs. Detroit Lions ====
Week 14: Detroit Lions (3–9) at Arizona Cardinals (4–8) – Game summary

Quarter	1	2	3	4	OT	Total
Lions	14	3	3	0	0	**20**
**Cardinals**	7	7	3	3	3	**23**

at Sun Devil Stadium, Tempe, Arizona

- Date: December 8
- Game time: 2:05 p.m. MST
- Game weather: 67 °F (19 °C)
- Game attendance: 28,640
- Referee: Gerry Austin
- TV announcers (Fox): Ron Pitts, Dwight Clark, Kevin McCabe
- Recap, Box Score

Game information

**First quarter**

- DET – Eddie Drummond 73-yard punt return (Jason Hanson kick), 13:15. Lions 7–0.
- ARI – Joel Makovicka 1-yard pass from Jake Plummer (Bill Gramática kick), 9:47. Tied 7–7.
- DET – Mikhael Ricks 6-yard pass from Joey Harrington (Jason Hanson kick), 0:05. Lions 14–7.

**Second quarter**

- DET – Jason Hanson 26-yard field goal, 3:20. Lions 17–7.
- ARI – Nate Poole 10-yard pass from Jake Plummer (Bill Gramática kick), 0:38. Lions 17–14.

**Third quarter**

- DET – Jason Hanson 20-yard field goal, 10:48. Lions 20–14.
- ARI – Bill Gramática 29-yard field goal, 5:18. Lions 20–17.

**Fourth quarter**

- ARI – Bill Gramática 41-yard field goal, 3:23. Tied 20–20.

**Overtime**

- ARI – Bill Gramática 42-yard field goal, 10:48. Cardinals 23–20.

**Top passers**

- DET – Joey Harrington – 20/37, 152 yards, TD
- ARI – Jake Plummer – 24/43, 228 yards, 2 TD, INT

**Top rushers**

- DET – James Stewart – 13 rushes, 52 yards
- ARI – Marcel Shipp – 25 rushes, 85 yards

**Top receivers**

- DET – James Stewart – 3 receptions, 34 yards
- ARI – Kevin Kasper – 3 receptions, 49 yards

==== Week 15: at St. Louis Rams ====
Week 15: Arizona Cardinals at St. Louis Rams – Game summary

Quarter	1	2	3	4	Total
Cardinals	0	7	14	7	**28**
**Rams**	3	21	0	6	**30**

at Edward Jones Dome, St. Louis, Missouri

- Date: December 15
- Game time: 7:35 p.m. CST/6:35 p.m. MST
- Game weather: None (Indoor stadium)
- Game attendance: 65,939
- Referee: Jeff Triplette
- TV announcers (ESPN): Mike Patrick, Paul Maguire, Joe Theismann, Suzy Kobler
- Box Score

Game information

**First quarter**

- STL – Jeff Wilkins 26-yard field goal, 11:54. Rams 3–0.

**Second quarter**

- STL – Dré Bly 78-yard punt return (Jeff Wilkins kick), 13:24. Rams 10–0.
- ARI – Marcel Shipp 5-yard run (Bill Gramática kick), 6:08. Rams 10–7.
- STL – Troy Edwards 4-yard pass from Marc Bulger (Jeff Wilkins kick), 1:03. Rams 17–7.
- STL – Torry Holt 3-yard pass from Marc Bulger (Jeff Wilkins kick), 0:02. Rams 24–7.

**Third quarter**

- ARI – Marcel Shipp 80-yard pass from Jake Plummer (Bill Gramática kick), 11:33. Rams 24–14.
- ARI – Marcel Shipp 1-yard run (Bill Gramática kick), 5:08. Rams 24–21.

**Fourth quarter**

- STL – Jeff Wilkins 37-yard field goal, 11:32. Rams 27–21.
- ARI – Steve Bush 1-yard pass from Jake Plummer (Bill Gramática kick), 7:46. Cardinals 28–27.
- STL – Jeff Wilkins 26-yard field goal, 0:20. Rams 30–28.

**Top passers**

- ARI – Jake Plummer – 17/27, 258 yards, 2 TD, INT
- STL – Marc Bulger – 24/40, 319 yards, 2 TD, 2 INT

**Top rushers**

- ARI – Marcel Shipp – 26 rushes, 79 yards, 2 TD
- STL – Marshall Faulk – 9 rushes, 39 yards

**Top receivers**

- ARI – Marcel Shipp – 2 receptions, 79 yards, TD
- STL – Torry Holt – 7 receptions, 141 yards, TD

==== Week 16: vs. San Francisco 49ers ====
Week 16: San Francisco 49ers at Arizona Cardinals – Game summary

Quarter	1	2	3	4	Total
**49ers**	7	3	7	0	**17**
Cardinals	0	7	0	7	**14**

at Sun Devil Stadium, Tempe, Arizona

- Date: December 21
- Game time: 3:05 p.m. MST
- Game weather: 50 °F (10 °C)
- Game attendance: 44,051
- Referee: Bob McElwee
- TV announcers (FOX): Sam Rosen, Bill Maas
- Box Score

Game information

**First quarter**

- SF – Fred Beasley 25-yard pass from Jeff Garcia (Jeff Chandler kick), 9:57. 49ers 7–0.

**Second quarter**

- ARI – Kevin Kasper 4-yard pass from Jake Plummer (Bill Gramática kick), 7:37. Tied 7–7.
- SF – Jeff Chandler 24-yard field goal, 0:45. 49ers 10–7.

**Third quarter**

- SF – Garrison Hearst 8-yard run (Jeff Chandler kick), 13:22. 49ers 17–7.

**Fourth quarter**

- ARI – Kevin Kasper 6-yard pass from Jake Plummer (Bill Gramática kick), 4:08. Cardinals 17–14.

**Top passers**

- SF – Jeff Garcia – 23/39, 256 yards, TD, INT
- ARI – Jake Plummer – 16/26, 109 yards, 2 TD, INT

**Top rushers**

- SF – Kevan Barlow – 13 rushes, 50 yards
- ARI – Marcel Shipp – 20 rushes, 84 yards

**Top receivers**

- SF – Tai Streets – 8 receptions, 90 yards
- ARI – Kevin Kasper – 4 receptions, 33 yards, 2 TD

==== Week 17: at Denver Broncos ====
Week 17: Arizona Cardinals at Denver Broncos – Game summary

Quarter	1	2	3	4	Total
Cardinals	0	7	0	0	**7**
**Broncos**	3	6	7	21	**37**

at Invesco Field at Mile High, Denver, Colorado

- Date: December 29
- Game time: 2:15 p.m. MST
- Game weather: 57 °F (14 °C)
- Game attendance: 75,164
- Referee: Larry Nemmers
- TV announcers (FOX): Curt Menefee, Tim Ryan, David Tredwell
- Box Score

Game information

**First quarter**

- DEN – Jason Elam 44-yard field goal, 4:30. Broncos 3–0.

**Second quarter**

- DEN – Jason Elam 54-yard field goal, 14:13. Broncos 6–0.
- DEN – Jason Elam 21-yard field goal, 8:06. Broncos 9–0.
- ARI – Kevin Kasper 1-yard pass from Jake Plummer (Bill Gramática kick), 0:01. Broncos 9–7.

**Third quarter**

- DEN – Ashley Lelie 5-yard pass from Steve Beuerlein (Jason Elam kick), 6:17. Broncos 16–7.

**Fourth quarter**

- DEN – Rod Smith 10-yard pass from Steve Beuerlein (Jason Elam kick), 12:49. Broncos 23–7.
- DEN – Clinton Portis 4-yard run (Jason Elam kick), 7:35. Broncos 30–7.
- DEN – Clinton Portis 12-yard run (Jason Elam kick), 4:11. Broncos 37–7.

**Top passers**

- ARI – Jake Plummer – 13/27, 132 yards, TD
- DEN – Steve Beuerlein – 16/24, 203 yards, 2 TD

**Top rushers**

- ARI – Marcel Shipp – 17 rushes, 58 yards
- DEN – Clinton Portis – 24 rushes, 228 yards, 2 TD

**Top receivers**

- ARI – Freddie Jones – 4 receptions, 45 yards
- DEN – Ed McCaffrey – 7 receptions, 112 yards

=== Standings ===
==== Division ====
NFC West
	W	L	T	PCT	DIV	CONF	PF	PA	STK
^{(4)} San Francisco 49ers	10	6	0	.625	5–1	8–4	367	351	L1
St. Louis Rams	7	9	0	.438	4–2	5–7	316	369	W1
Seattle Seahawks	7	9	0	.438	2–4	5–7	355	369	W3
Arizona Cardinals	5	11	0	.313	1–5	5–7	262	417	L3

==== Conference ====
NFC
#	Team	Division	W	L	T	PCT	DIV	CONF	SOS	SOV
**Division leaders**
1 (Note: Philadelphia finished ahead of Tampa Bay and Green Bay based on conference record (11–1 vs 9–3/9–3).)	Philadelphia Eagles	East	12	4	0	.750	5–1	11–1	.469	.432
2 (Note: Tampa Bay finished ahead of Green Bay based on head-to-head victory.)	Tampa Bay Buccaneers	South	12	4	0	.750	4–2	9–3	.482	.432
3	Green Bay Packers	North	12	4	0	.750	5–1	9–3	.451	.414
4	San Francisco 49ers	West	10	6	0	.625	5–1	8–4	.504	.450
**Wild Cards**
5	New York Giants	East	10	6	0	.625	5–1	8–4	.482	.450
6	Atlanta Falcons	South	9	6	1	.594	4–2	7–5	.494	.429
**Did not qualify for the postseason**
7	New Orleans Saints	South	9	7	0	.563	3–3	7–5	.498	.566
8 (Note: St. Louis finished ahead of Seattle based on division record (4–2 to 2–4).)	St. Louis Rams	West	7	9	0	.438	4–2	5–7	.508	.446
9	Seattle Seahawks	West	7	9	0	.438	2–4	5–7	.506	.433
10 (Note: Washington finished ahead of Carolina based on common games (2–3 to 1–4))	Washington Redskins	East	7	9	0	.438	1–5	4–8	.527	.438
11	Carolina Panthers	South	7	9	0	.438	1–5	4–8	.486	.357
12	Minnesota Vikings	North	6	10	0	.375	4–2	5–7	.498	.417
13 (Note: Arizona finished ahead of Dallas based on head-to-head victory.)	Arizona Cardinals	West	5	11	0	.313	1–5	5–7	.500	.400
14	Dallas Cowboys	East	5	11	0	.313	1–5	3–9	.500	.475
15	Chicago Bears	North	4	12	0	.250	2–4	3–9	.521	.430
16	Detroit Lions	North	3	13	0	.188	1–5	3–9	.494	.375
**Tiebreakers** (Note: When breaking ties for three or more teams under the NFL's rules, they are first broken within divisions, then comparing only the highest-ranked remaining team from each division.)
