= 2003 Arizona Cardinals season =

NFL team season

- Owner: Bill Bidwill
- General manager: Rod Graves
- Head coach: Dave McGinnis
- Home stadium: Sun Devil Stadium

Results
- Record: 4–12
- Division place: 4th NFC West
- Playoffs: Did not qualify
- Pro Bowlers: WR Anquan Boldin

The 2003 Arizona Cardinals season was the franchise's 105th season, 84th season in the National Football League and the 16th in Arizona. The team was unable to improve upon their previous output of 5–11, instead winning only four games, although this was not considered a disaster as before their win over the Packers there was talk the 2003 Cardinals would become the first NFL team to go 0–16. For the fifth consecutive season, the franchise failed to reach the playoffs, and based on point differential had the worst record in the only NFL season where every team won at least four games. This resulted in the Cardinals firing head coach Dave McGinnis and replacing him with Dennis Green. In his NFL debut, Anquan Boldin had 217 receiving yards.

The team recorded a notable highlight in the last game of the season. Instead of choosing to tank and secure the number 1 draft pick, the Cardinals chose to play spoiler, rallying from an 11-point deficit with minutes left in the fourth quarter and defeating the Vikings on a touchdown pass by Josh McCown to Nate Poole with zeroes on the clock to knock the Vikings out of the playoffs. The win is considered to have had a huge impact on NFL history; on top of giving the Packers the NFC North crown, it had a significant effect on the draft next year, as the win knocked the Cardinals down to the number 3 spot and gave the first pick to the Chargers. The Chargers would select Eli Manning with that pick and trade him to the Giants for fourth overall pick Phillip Rivers, while the Cardinals would select Larry Fitzgerald, who became one of the greatest players in franchise history.

== Offseason ==
=== Draft ===
2003 Arizona Cardinals draft
Round	Pick	Player	Position	College	Notes
1	17	Bryant Johnson	WR	Penn State	
1	18	Calvin Pace	DE	Wake Forest	
2	54	Anquan Boldin *	WR	Florida State	
3	70	Gerald Hayes	LB	Pittsburgh	
5	141	Kenny King	DE	Alabama	
6	177	Reggie Wells	G	Clarion	
6	210	Tony Gilbert	LB	Georgia	
Made roster † Pro Football Hall of Fame * Made at least one Pro Bowl during career

== Personnel ==
=== Staff ===
2003 Arizona Cardinals staff
Front office: President – Bill Bidwill; Vice president/general counsel – Michael Bidwill; Vice president of football operations – Rod Graves; Head coaches: Head coach – Dave McGinnis; Offensive coaches: Offensive coordinator – Jerry Sullivan; Quarterbacks – Geep Chryst; Running backs – Johnny Roland; Wide receivers – Tyke Tolbert; Tight ends – Marty Galbraith; Offensive line – George Warhop; Assistant off. line/off. quality control – Mike Devlin	Defensive coaches: Defensive coordinator – Larry Marmie; Defensive line – Joe Greene; Assistant defensive line – Cary Godette; Linebackers – Jeff FitzGerald; Defensive backs – Ron Milus; Special teams coaches: Special teams – Hank Kuhlmann; Special teams assistant/def. quality control – Stan Kwan; Strength and conditioning: Strength and conditioning – Bob Rogucki

=== Roster ===
2003 Arizona Cardinals roster
Quarterbacks (QB): 11 Jeff Blake; 12 Josh McCown; 15 Preston Parsons; Running backs (RB): 20 Damien Anderson; 42 James Hodgins FB; 46 Josh Rue; 33 Josh Scobey KR; 31 Marcel Shipp; 22 Emmitt Smith; Wide receivers (WR): 81 Anquan Boldin PR; 86 Bryan Gilmore; 83 Bryant Johnson; 82 Kevin Kasper KR; 89 Nate Poole; Tight ends (TE): 84 Mike Banks; 87 Steve Bush; 49 Lorenzo Diamond; 85 Freddie Jones	Offensive linemen (OL): 65 Anthony Clement T; 75 Leonard Davis G; 67 Chris Dishman G; 63 Frank Garcia C; 66 Pete Kendall C; 73 Raleigh Roundtree G; 70 L. J. Shelton T; 76 Cameron Spikes G; 74 Reggie Wells T; Defensive linemen (DL): 94 Marcus Bell DT; 91 Wendell Bryant DT; 98 Russell Davis DT; 72 Kenny King DE; 96 Dennis Johnson DE; 97 Calvin Pace DE; 95 Derrick Ransom DT; 92 Barron Tanner DT; 97 Fred Wakefield DE	Linebackers (LB): 51 James Darling OLB; 52 Levar Fisher OLB; 54 Gerald Hayes OLB; 57 Ronald McKinnon MLB; 56 LeVar Woods OLB; 53 Michael Young MLB; Defensive backs (DB): 36 David Barrett CB; 25 Jason Goss CB; 29 Quentin Harris SS; 21 Renaldo Hill CB; 34 Dexter Jackson FS; 26 Emmanuel McDaniel CB; 23 Coby Rhinehart CB; 24 Adrian Wilson SS; Special teams (ST): 48 Nathan Hodel LS; 10 Scott Player P; 1 Neil Rackers K	Practice squad: 58 Trev Faulk LB; 64 Steven Grace C; 90 Aaron Hunt DT; 14 Reggie Newhouse WR; 68 Tony Wragge G (IR); Reserve: 27 Nijrell Eason S (IR); 7 Bill Gramática K (IR); 41 Justin Lucas S (IR); 80 Jason McAddley WR (IR); 78 Kendrick Rogers T (IR); 50 Jason Starkey C (IR); 28 Duane Starks CB (IR); 44 Michael Stone S (IR); 55 Raynoch Thompson LB (Susp.); 93 Kyle Vanden Bosch DE (IR); 71 Teag Whiting G (IR); Rookies in italics 53 active, 12 reserve, 4 practice squad

== Regular season ==
=== Schedule ===
Week	Date	Opponent	Result	Record	Venue	Attendance
1	September 7	at Detroit Lions	**L** 24–42	0–1	Ford Field	60,691
2	September 14	**Seattle Seahawks**	**L** 0–38	0–2	Sun Devil Stadium	23,127
3	September 21	Green Bay Packers	**W** 20–13	1–2	Sun Devil Stadium	58,784
4	September 28	at **St. Louis Rams**	**L** 13–37	1–3	Edward Jones Dome	65,758
5	October 5	at Dallas Cowboys	**L** 7–24	1–4	Texas Stadium	63,601
6	October 12	Baltimore Ravens	**L** 18–26	1–5	Sun Devil Stadium	24,193
7	Bye					
8	October 26	**San Francisco 49ers**	**W** 16–13 (OT)	2–5	Sun Devil Stadium	40,824
9	November 2	Cincinnati Bengals	**W** 17–14	3–5	Sun Devil Stadium	23,531
10	November 9	at Pittsburgh Steelers	**L** 15–28	3–6	Heinz Field	59,520
11	November 16	at Cleveland Browns	**L** 6–44	3–7	Cleveland Browns Stadium	72,908
12	November 23	**St. Louis Rams**	**L** 27–30 (OT)	3–8	Sun Devil Stadium	42,089
13	November 30	at Chicago Bears	**L** 3–28	3–9	Soldier Field	61,550
14	December 7	at **San Francisco 49ers**	**L** 14–50	3–10	San Francisco Stadium	66,975
15	December 14	Carolina Panthers	**L** 17–20	3–11	Sun Devil Stadium	23,217
16	December 21	at **Seattle Seahawks**	**L** 10–28	3–12	Seahawks Stadium	64,899
17	December 28	Minnesota Vikings	**W** 18–17	4–12	Sun Devil Stadium	52,734

Note: Intra-division opponents are in bold text.

=== Game summaries ===
==== Week 1: at Detroit Lions ====
Week 1: Arizona Cardinals at Detroit Lions – Game summary

Quarter	1	2	3	4	Total
Cardinals	7	7	10	0	**24**
**Lions**	7	7	14	14	**42**

at Ford Field, Detroit, Michigan

- Date: September 7
- Game time: 1:05 p.m. EST/11:05 a.m. MST
- Game weather: None (Indoor stadium)
- Game attendance: 60,691
- Referee: Bill Carollo
- Box Score

Game information

**First quarter**

- ARI – Anquan Boldin 7-yard pass from Jeff Blake (Bill Gramática kick), 5:48. Cardinals 7–0. **Drive: 11 plays, 80 yards, 6:39.**
- DET – Charles Rogers 4-yard pass from Joey Harrington (Jason Hanson kick), 2:00. Tied 7–7. **Drive: 8 plays, 58 yards, 3:48.**

**Second quarter**

- DET – Charles Rogers 13-yard pass from Joey Harrington (Jason Hanson kick), 11:27. Lions 14–7. **Drive: 6 plays, 29 yards, 3:03.**
- ARI – Freddie Jones 12-yard pass from Jeff Blake (Bill Gramática kick), 5:35. Tied 14–14. **Drive: 9 plays, 71 yards, 5:52.**

**Third quarter**

- ARI – Anquan Boldin 71-yard pass from Jeff Blake (Bill Gramática kick), 13:59. Cardinals 21–14. **Drive: 3 plays, 72 yards, 1:01.**
- DET – Eddie Drummond 57-yard punt return (Jason Hanson kick), 8:21. Tied 21–21.
- DET – Cory Schlesinger 8-yard pass from Joey Harrington (Jason Hanson kick), 3:12. Lions 28–21. **Drive: 2 plays, 35 yards, 0:50.**
- ARI – Bill Gramática 38-yard field goal, 0:44. Lions 28–24. **Drive: 7 plays, 41 yards, 2:28.**

**Fourth quarter**

- DET – Bill Schroeder 5-yard pass from Joey Harrington (Jason Hanson kick), 11:43. Lions 35–24. **Drive: 6 plays, 36 yards, 2:51.**
- DET – Dré Bly 48-yard interception return (Jason Hanson kick), 10:50. Lions 42–24.

**Top passers**

- ARI – Jeff Blake – 28/46, 358 yards, 3 TD, INT
- DET – Joey Harrington – 17/30, 195 yards, 4 TD

**Top rushers**

- ARI – Emmitt Smith – 13 rushes, 64 yards
- DET – Olandis Gary – 12 rushes, 44 yards

**Top receivers**

- ARI – Anquan Boldin – 10 receptions, 217 yards, 2 TD
- DET – Mikhael Ricks – 2 receptions, 43 yards

==== Week 2: vs. Seattle Seahawks ====
Week 2: Seattle Seahawks at Arizona Cardinals – Game summary

Quarter	1	2	3	4	Total
**Seahawks**	7	17	7	7	**38**
Cardinals	0	0	0	0	**0**

at Sun Devil Stadium, Tempe, Arizona

- Date: September 14
- Game time: 2:05 p.m. MST
- Game weather: 98 °F (37 °C)
- Game attendance: 23,127
- Referee: Ron Blum
- TV announcers (Fox): Curt Menefee, Tim Green, Kevin McCabe
- Box Score

Game information

**First quarter**

- SEA – Matt Hasselbeck 2-yard run (Josh Brown kick), 13:42. Seahawks 7–0. **Drive: 3 plays, 6 yards, 1:06.**

**Second quarter**

- SEA – Randall Godfrey 55-yard fumble return (Josh Brown kick), 14:11. Seahawks 14–0.
- SEA – Josh Brown 37-yard field goal, 6:01. Seahawks 17–0. **Drive: 9 plays, 50 yards, 4:31.**
- SEA – Darrell Jackson 55-yard pass from Matt Hasselbeck (Josh Brown kick), 1:16. Seahawks 24–0. **Drive: 3 plays, 57 yards, 1:07.**

**Third quarter**

- SEA – Darrell Jackson 66-yard pass from Matt Hasselbeck (Josh Brown kick), 13:59. Seahawks 31–0. **Drive: 3 plays, 66 yards, 1:01.**

**Fourth quarter**

- SEA – Shaun Alexander 2-yard run (Josh Brown kick), 10:26. Seahawks 38–0. **Drive: 13 plays, 96 yards, 7:31.**

**Top passers**

- SEA – Matt Hasselbeck – 8/19, 175 yards, 2 TD
- ARI – Josh McCown – 18/32, 150 yards, 2 INT

**Top rushers**

- SEA – Maurice Morris – 11 rushes, 67 yards
- ARI – Emmitt Smith – 14 rushes, 54 yards

**Top receivers**

- SEA – Darrell Jackson – 3 receptions, 133 yards, 2 TD
- ARI – Bryant Johnson – 7 receptions, 68 yards

==== Week 3: vs. Green Bay Packers ====
Week 3: Green Bay Packers at Arizona Cardinals – Game summary

Quarter	1	2	3	4	Total
Packers	0	10	0	3	**13**
**Cardinals**	7	3	3	7	**20**

at Sun Devil Stadium, Tempe, Arizona

- Date: September 21
- Game time: 2:05 p.m. MST
- Game weather: 102 °F (39 °C)
- Game attendance: 58,784
- Referee: Mike Carey
- Box Score

Game information

**First quarter**

- ARI – Jeff Blake 1-yard run (Bill Gramática kick), 4:16. Cardinals 7–0. **Drive: 4 plays, 39 yards, 2:26.**

**Second quarter**

- GB – David Martin 4-yard pass from Brett Favre (Ryan Longwell kick), 6:44. Tied 7–7. **Drive: 8 plays, 61 yards, 4:15.**
- GB – Ryan Longwell 40-yard field goal, 1:17. Packers 10–7. **Drive: 11 plays, 54 yards, 4:12.**
- ARI – Bill Gramática 21-yard field goal, 0:05. Tied 10–10. **Drive: 9 plays, 77 yards, 1:12.**

**Third quarter**

- ARI – Bill Gramática 37-yard field goal, 7:31. Cardinals 13–10. **Drive: 8 plays, 37 yards, 2:48.**

**Fourth quarter**

- GB – Ryan Longwell 40-yard field goal, 11:08. Tied 13–13. **Drive: 3 plays, 6 yards, 1:06.**
- ARI – James Hodgins 1-yard pass from Jeff Blake (Bill Gramática kick), 3:59. Cardinals 20–13. **Drive: 11 plays, 68 yards, 7:09.**

**Top passers**

- GB – Brett Favre – 23/33, 245 yards, TD, INT
- ARI – Jeff Blake – 20/31, 273 yards, TD, INT

**Top rushers**

- GB – Ahman Green – 21 rushes, 53 yards
- ARI – Emmitt Smith – 20 rushes, 50 yards

**Top receivers**

- GB – William Henderson – 3 receptions, 47 yards
- ARI – Anquan Boldin – 5 receptions, 99 yards

==== Week 4: at St. Louis Rams ====
Week 4: Arizona Cardinals at St. Louis Rams – Game summary

Quarter	1	2	3	4	Total
Cardinals	0	7	6	0	**13**
**Rams**	14	6	3	14	**37**

at Edward Jones Dome, St. Louis, Missouri

- Date: September 28
- Game time: 12:00 p.m. CST/11:00 a.m. MST
- Game weather: None (Indoor stadium)
- Game attendance: 65,758
- Referee: Walt Coleman
- Box Score

Game information

**First quarter**

- STL – Lamar Gordon 3-yard run (Jeff Wilkins kick), 9:31. Rams 7–0. **Drive: 8 plays, 46 yards, 3:43.**
- STL – Dane Looker 6-yard pass from Marc Bulger (Jeff Wilkins kick), 0:39. Rams 14–0. **Drive: 12 plays, 80 yards, 6:22.**

**Second quarter**

- STL – Jeff Wilkins 24-yard field goal, 7:45. Rams 17–0. **Drive: 13 plays, 63 yards, 6:33.**
- ARI – Emmitt Smith 1-yard run (Bill Gramática kick), 0:36. Rams 17–7. **Drive: 13 plays, 64 yards, 7:09.**
- STL – Jeff Wilkins 53-yard field goal, 0:00. Rams 20–7. **Drive: 1 play, 0 yards, 0:03.**

**Third quarter**

- STL – Jeff Wilkins 31-yard field goal, 7:17. Rams 23–7. **Drive: 13 plays, 52 yards, 7:43.**
- ARI – Josh Scobey 100-yard kickoff return (pass failed), 7:03. Rams 23–13.

**Fourth quarter**

- STL – Torry Holt 7-yard pass from Marc Bulger (Jeff Wilkins kick), 13:11. Rams 30–13. **Drive: 4 plays, 22 yards, 1:20.**
- STL – Marc Bulger 2-yard run (Jeff Wilkins kick), 4:06. Rams 37–13. **Drive: 13 plays, 69 yards, 8:03.**

**Top passers**

- ARI – Jeff Blake – 10/17, 88 yards
- STL – Marc Bulger – 28/42, 272 yards, 2 TD, INT

**Top rushers**

- ARI – Emmitt Smith – 12 rushes, 25 yards, TD
- STL – Lamar Gordon – 21 rushes, 81 yards, TD

**Top receivers**

- ARI – Anquan Boldin – 7 receptions, 86 yards
- STL – Torry Holt – 12 receptions, 133 yards, TD

==== Week 5: at Dallas Cowboys ====
Week 5: Arizona Cardinals at Dallas Cowboys – Game summary

Quarter	1	2	3	4	Total
Cardinals	7	0	0	0	**7**
**Cowboys**	7	10	7	0	**24**

at Texas Stadium, Irving, Texas

- Date: October 5
- Game time: 12:00 p.m. CST/11:00 a.m. MST
- Game weather: 70 °F (21 °C)
- Game attendance: 63,601
- Referee: Peter Morelli
- Box Score

Game information

**First quarter**

- DAL – Terry Glenn 51-yard pass from Quincy Carter (Billy Cundiff kick), 3:33. Cowboys 7–0. **Drive: 1 play, 51 yards, 0:08.**
- ARI – Bryan Gilmore 24-yard pass from Jeff Blake (Tim Duncan kick), 3:33. Tied 7–7. **Drive: 3 plays, 31 yards, 1:41.**

**Second quarter**

- DAL – Richie Anderson 18-yard pass from Quincy Carter (Billy Cundiff kick), 13:48. Cowboys 14–7. **Drive: 6 plays, 66 yards, 3:04.**
- DAL – Billy Cundiff 33-yard field goal, 2:12. Cowboys 17–7. **Drive: 13 plays, 65 yards, 5:48.**

**Third quarter**

- DAL – Billy Cundiff 36-yard field goal, 10:29. Cowboys 20–7. **Drive: 8 plays, 53 yards, 4:31.**
- DAL – Team safety, 6:46. Cowboys 22–7.
- DAL – Team safety, 3:34. Cowboys 24–7.

**Fourth quarter**

- No scoring plays

**Top passers**

- ARI – Jeff Blake – 14/28, 121 yards, TD, 2 INT
- DAL – Quincy Carter – 20/31, 277 yards, 2 TD, INT

**Top rushers**

- ARI – Marcel Shipp – 9 rushes, 31 yards
- DAL – Troy Hambrick – 23 rushes, 59 yards

**Top receivers**

- ARI – Freddie Jones – 4 receptions, 39 yards
- DAL – Terry Glenn – 4 receptions, 104 yards, TD

==== Week 6: vs. Baltimore Ravens ====
Week 6: Baltimore Ravens at Arizona Cardinals – Game summary

Quarter	1	2	3	4	Total
**Ravens**	3	13	7	3	**26**
Cardinals	7	3	0	8	**18**

at Sun Devil Stadium, Tempe, Arizona

- Date: October 12
- Game time: 2:15 p.m. MST
- Game weather: 96 °F (36 °C)
- Game attendance: 24,193
- Referee: Tony Corrente
- Box Score

Game information

**First quarter**

- ARI – Bryan Gilmore 14-yard pass from Jeff Blake (Tim Duncan kick), 10:59. Cardinals 7–0. **Drive: 6 plays, 74 yards, 4:01.**
- BAL – Matt Stover 31-yard field goal, 4:16. Cardinals 7–3. **Drive: 12 plays, 56 yards, 6:43.**

**Second quarter**

- BAL – Matt Stover 22-yard field goal, 7:20. Cardinals 7–6. **Drive: 9 plays, 31 yards, 4:33.**
- BAL – Matt Stover 29-yard field goal, 3:11. Ravens 9–7. **Drive: 6 plays, 53 yards, 2:26.**
- BAL – Ed Reed 22-yard blocked punt return (Matt Stover kick), 1:47. Ravens 16–7.
- ARI – Tim Duncan 46-yard field goal, 0:02. Ravens 16–10. **Drive: 6 plays, 15 yards, 1:45.**

**Third quarter**

- BAL – Chris McAlister 83-yard interception return (Matt Stover kick), 4:03. Ravens 23–10.

**Fourth quarter**

- BAL – Matt Stover 37-yard field goal, 11:17. Ravens 26–10. **Drive: 11 plays, 38 yards, 5:35.**
- ARI – Freddie Jones 12-yard pass from Jeff Blake (Jeff Blake run), 0:15. Ravens 26–18. **Drive: 9 plays, 82 yards, 1:39.**

**Top passers**

- BAL – Kyle Boller – 9/18, 75 yards
- ARI – Jeff Blake – 22/36, 247 yards, 2 TD, 3 INT

**Top rushers**

- BAL – Jamal Lewis – 21 rushes, 131 yards
- ARI – Marcel Shipp – 14 rushes, 61 yards

**Top receivers**

- BAL – Chester Taylor – 3 receptions, 25 yards
- ARI – Anquan Boldin – 6 receptions, 95 yards

==== Week 8: vs. San Francisco 49ers ====
Week 8: San Francisco 49ers at Arizona Cardinals – Game summary

Quarter	1	2	3	4	OT	Total
49ers	6	0	0	7	0	**13**
**Cardinals**	7	3	3	0	3	**16**

at Sun Devil Stadium, Tempe, Arizona

- Date: October 26
- Game time: 2:05 p.m. MST
- Game weather: 80 °F (27 °C)
- Game attendance: 40,824
- Referee: Bill Leavy
- Box Score

Game information

**First quarter**

- SF – Jeff Garcia 21-yard run (pass failed), 11:02. 49ers 6–0. **Drive: 5 plays, 45 yards, 2:20.**
- ARI – Jeff Blake 1-yard run (Tim Duncan kick), 3:52. Cardinals 7–6. **Drive: 12 plays, 70 yards, 7:10.**

**Second quarter**

- ARI – Tim Duncan 53-yard field goal, 0:28. Cardinals 10–6. **Drive: 9 plays, 35 yards, 4:12.**

**Third quarter**

- ARI – Tim Duncan 20-yard field goal, 7:53. Cardinals 13–6. **Drive: 4 plays, 9 yards, 1:04.**

**Fourth quarter**

- SF – Kwame Harris 1-yard fumble return (Owen Pochman kick), 7:12. Tied 13–13. **Drive: 11 plays, 73 yards, 5:14.**

**Overtime**

- ARI – Tim Duncan 39-yard field goal, 10:01. Cardinals 16–13. **Drive: 9 plays, 38 yards, 4:59.**

**Top passers**

- SF – Jeff Garcia – 13/24, 153 yards
- ARI – Jeff Blake – 14/24, 97 yards

**Top rushers**

- SF – Jeff Garcia – 4 rushes, 44 yards, TD
- ARI – Marcel Shipp – 35 rushes, 165 yards

**Top receivers**

- SF – Terrell Owens – 6 receptions, 53 yards
- ARI – Anquan Boldin – 3 receptions, 29 yards

==== Week 9: vs. Cincinnati Bengals ====
Week 9: Cincinnati Bengals at Arizona Cardinals – Game summary

Quarter	1	2	3	4	Total
Bengals	7	7	0	0	**14**
**Cardinals**	7	3	7	0	**17**

at Sun Devil Stadium, Tempe, Arizona

- Date: November 2
- Game time: 2:05 p.m. MST
- Game weather: 75 °F (24 °C)
- Game attendance: 23,531
- Referee: Mike Carey
- Box Score

Game information

**First quarter**

- ARI – Freddie Jones 1-yard pass from Jeff Blake (Tim Duncan kick), 8:24. Cardinals 7–0. **Drive: 8 plays, 47 yards, 3:58.**
- CIN – Rudi Johnson 2-yard run (Shayne Graham kick), 1:14. Tied 7–7. **Drive: 9 plays, 41 yards, 4:05.**

**Second quarter**

- CIN – Peter Warrick 15-yard pass from Jon Kitna (Shayne Graham kick), 13:39. Bengals 14–7. **Drive: 3 plays, 55 yards, 0:57.**
- ARI – Tim Duncan 31-yard field goal, 4:14. Bengals 14–10. **Drive: 8 plays, 34 yards, 3:51.**

**Third quarter**

- ARI – Anquan Boldin 7-yard pass from Jeff Blake (Tim Duncan kick), 8:12. Cardinals 17–14. **Drive: 13 plays, 80 yards, 6:48.**

**Fourth quarter**

- No scoring plays

**Top passers**

- CIN – Jon Kitna – 21/38, 218 yards, TD, 2 INT
- ARI – Jeff Blake – 18/28, 166 yards, 2 TD

**Top rushers**

- CIN – Rudi Johnson – 8 rushes, 34 yards, TD
- ARI – Marcel Shipp – 29 rushes, 141 yards

**Top receivers**

- CIN – Chad Johnson – 4 receptions, 75 yards
- ARI – Anquan Boldin – 6 receptions, 51 yards, TD

==== Week 10: at Pittsburgh Steelers ====
Week 10: Arizona Cardinals at Pittsburgh Steelers – Game summary

Quarter	1	2	3	4	Total
Cardinals	0	3	6	6	**15**
**Steelers**	0	7	21	0	**28**

at Heinz Field, Pittsburgh, Pennsylvania

- Date: November 9
- Game time: 1:00 p.m. EST/11:00 a.m. MST
- Game weather: 38 °F (3 °C)
- Game attendance: 59,520
- Referee: Jeff Triplette
- Box Score

Game information

**First quarter**

- No scoring plays

**Second quarter**

- PIT – Chris Doering 9-yard pass from Tommy Maddox (Jeff Reed kick), 5:59. Steelers 7–0. **Drive: 12 plays, 83 yards, 6:32.**
- ARI – Tim Duncan 20-yard field goal, 0:11. Steelers 7–3. **Drive: 7 plays, 15 yards, 1:39.**

**Third quarter**

- PIT – Hines Ward 5-yard pass from Tommy Maddox (Jeff Reed kick), 13:16. Steelers 14–3. **Drive: 2 plays, 27 yards, 0:13.**
- PIT – Hines Ward 22-yard pass from Tommy Maddox (Jeff Reed kick), 12:09. Steelers 21–3. **Drive: 1 play, 22 yards, 0:06.**
- PIT – Antwaan Randle El 52-yard punt return (Jeff Reed kick), 6:33. Steelers 28–3.
- ARI – Anquan Boldin 11-yard pass from Jeff Blake (kick failed), 2:29. Steelers 28–9. **Drive: 7 plays, 79 yards, 4:04.**

**Fourth quarter**

- ARI – Bryant Johnson 54-yard pass from Jeff Blake (pass failed), 0:17. Steelers 28–15. **Drive: 6 plays, 82 yards, 1:25.**

**Top passers**

- ARI – Jeff Blake – 23/43, 307 yards, 2 TD
- PIT – Tommy Maddox – 12/24, 159 yards, 3 TD

**Top rushers**

- ARI – Marcel Shipp – 22 rushes, 63 yards
- PIT – Jerome Bettis – 18 rushes, 54 yards

**Top receivers**

- ARI – Anquan Boldin – 8 receptions, 118 yards, TD
- PIT – Hines Ward – 6 receptions, 64 yards, 2 TD

==== Week 11: at Cleveland Browns ====
Week 11: Arizona Cardinals at Cleveland Browns – Game summary

Quarter	1	2	3	4	Total
Cardinals	0	3	3	0	**6**
**Browns**	10	10	14	10	**44**

at Cleveland Browns Stadium, Cleveland, Ohio

- Date: November 16
- Game time: 1:05 p.m. EST/11:05 a.m. MST
- Game weather: 43 °F (6 °C)
- Game attendance: 72,908
- Referee: Ron Winter
- Box Score

Game information

**First quarter**

- CLE – Phil Dawson 34-yard field goal, 9:06. Browns 3–0. **Drive: 11 plays, 58 yards, 5:54.**
- CLE – André Davis 4-yard pass from Kelly Holcomb (Phil Dawson kick), 2:57. Browns 10–0. **Drive: 6 plays, 60 yards, 3:50.**

**Second quarter**

- CLE – Phil Dawson 24-yard field goal, 11:16. Browns 13–0. **Drive: 11 plays, 74 yards, 5:37.**
- CLE – Dennis Northcutt 1-yard pass from Kelly Holcomb (Phil Dawson kick), 4:14. Browns 20–0. **Drive: 10 plays, 62 yards, 5:22.**
- ARI – Neil Rackers 42-yard field goal, 0:55. Browns 20–3. **Drive: 8 plays, 23 yards, 3:19.**

**Third quarter**

- ARI – Neil Rackers 26-yard field goal, 9:55. Browns 20–6. **Drive: 5 plays, 57 yards, 1:35.**
- CLE – James Jackson 4-yard run (Phil Dawson kick), 6:59. Browns 27–6. **Drive: 5 plays, 47 yards, 2:56.**
- CLE – Quincy Morgan 68-yard pass from Kelly Holcomb (Phil Dawson kick), 2:56. Browns 34–6. **Drive: 4 plays, 86 yards, 2:04.**

**Fourth quarter**

- CLE – James Jackson 4-yard run (Phil Dawson kick), 14:20. Browns 41–6. **Drive: 4 plays, 45 yards, 1:39.**
- CLE – Phil Dawson 29-yard field goal, 8:57. Browns 44–6. **Drive: 7 plays, 44 yards, 3:32.**

**Top passers**

- ARI – Jeff Blake – 9/21, 121 yards, INT
- CLE – Kelly Holcomb – 29/35, 392 yards, 3 TD

**Top rushers**

- ARI – Marcel Shipp – 9 rushes, 23 yards
- CLE – James Jackson – 19 rushes, 45 yards, 2 TD

**Top receivers**

- ARI – Anquan Boldin – 4 receptions, 86 yards
- CLE – André Davis – 7 receptions, 117 yards, TD

==== Week 12: vs. St. Louis Rams ====
Week 12: St. Louis Rams at Arizona Cardinals – Game summary

Quarter	1	2	3	4	OT	Total
**Rams**	14	3	7	3	3	**30**
Cardinals	0	10	7	10	0	**27**

at Sun Devil Stadium, Tempe, Arizona

- Date: November 23
- Game time: 2:05 p.m. MST
- Game weather: 58 °F (14 °C)
- Game attendance: 42,089
- Referee: Ron Blum
- Box Score

Game information

**First quarter**

- STL – Marshall Faulk 1-yard run (Jeff Wilkins kick), 9:15. Rams 7–0. **Drive: 7 plays, 39 yards, 3:47.**
- STL – Isaac Bruce 14-yard pass from Marc Bulger (Jeff Wilkins kick), 3:35. Rams 14–0. **Drive: 4 plays, 64 yards, 2:08.**

**Second quarter**

- ARI – Neil Rackers 22-yard field goal, 5:33. Rams 14–3. **Drive: 10 plays, 76 yards, 4:51.**
- ARI – Renaldo Hill 70-yard interception return, 1:50. Rams 14–10.
- STL – Jeff Wilkins 20-yard field goal, 0:00. Rams 17–10. **Drive: 8 plays, 64 yards, 1:50.**

**Third quarter**

- STL – Travis Fisher 57-yard interception return, 10:43. Rams 24–10.
- ARI – Anquan Boldin 54-yard pass from Jeff Blake (Neil Rackers kick), 0:00. Rams 24–17. **Drive: 1 play, 54 yards, 0:07.**

**Fourth quarter**

- ARI – Anquan Boldin 3-yard pass from Jeff Blake (Neil Rackers kick), 11:59. Tied 24–24. **Drive: 6 plays, 22 yards, 2:43.**
- ARI – Neil Rackers 27-yard field goal, 6:05. Rams 27–24. **Drive: 4 plays, 9 yards, 1:36.**
- STL – Jeff Wilkins 24-yard field goal, 0:00. Tied 27–27. **Drive: 16 plays, 82 yards, 3:23.**

**Overtime**

- STL – Jeff Wilkins 49-yard field goal, 10:22. Rams 30–27. **Drive: 8 plays, 55 yards, 4:38.**

**Top passers**

- STL – Marc Bulger – 28/44, 329 yards, TD, 4 INT
- ARI – Jeff Blake – 15/27, 192 yards, 2 TD, 2 INT

**Top rushers**

- STL – Marshall Faulk – 24 rushes, 100 yards, TD
- ARI – Marcel Shipp – 24 rushes, 95 yards

**Top receivers**

- STL – Torry Holt – 9 receptions, 145 yards
- ARI – Anquan Boldin – 6 receptions, 123 yards, 2 TD

==== Week 13: at Chicago Bears ====
Week 13: Arizona Cardinals at Chicago Bears – Game summary

Quarter	1	2	3	4	Total
Cardinals	3	0	0	0	**3**
**Bears**	7	0	0	21	**28**

at Soldier Field, Chicago, Illinois

- Date: November 30
- Game time: 12:05 p.m. CST/11:05 a.m. MST
- Game weather: 51 °F (11 °C)
- Game attendance: 61,550
- Referee: Johnny Grier
- Box Score

Game information

**First quarter**

- CHI – Marty Booker 2-yard pass from Kordell Stewart (Paul Edinger kick), 8:50. Bears 7–0. **Drive: 6 plays, 96 yards, 3:11.**
- ARI – Neil Rackers 32-yard field goal, 2:37. Bears 7–3. **Drive: 11 plays, 57 yards, 6:13.**

**Second quarter**

- No scoring plays

**Third quarter**

- No scoring plays

**Fourth quarter**

- CHI – Dez White 10-yard pass from Kordell Stewart (Paul Edinger kick), 13:55. Bears 14–3. **Drive: 2 plays, 12 yards, 0:43.**
- CHI – Kordell Stewart 8-yard run (Paul Edinger kick), 7:46. Bears 21–3. **Drive: 8 plays, 65 yards, 4:32.**
- CHI – Brock Forsey 9-yard run (Paul Edinger kick), 3:33. Browns 28–3. **Drive: 6 plays, 34 yards, 2:55.**

**Top passers**

- ARI – Jeff Blake – 20/32, 163 yards, 2 INT
- CHI – Kordell Stewart – 22/37, 284 yards, 2 TD

**Top rushers**

- ARI – Marcel Shipp – 14 rushes, 34 yards
- CHI – James Jackson – 27 rushes, 134 yards, TD

**Top receivers**

- ARI – Freddie Jones – 6 receptions, 62 yards
- CHI – Justin Gage – 4 receptions, 100 yards

==== Week 14: at San Francisco 49ers ====
Week 14: Arizona Cardinals at San Francisco 49ers – Game summary

Quarter	1	2	3	4	Total
Cardinals	0	0	7	7	**14**
**49ers**	14	20	9	7	**50**

at San Francisco Stadium, San Francisco, California

- Date: December 7
- Game time: 1:05 p.m. PST/2:05 p.m. MST
- Game weather: 58 °F (14 °C)
- Game attendance: 66,975
- Referee: Peter Morelli
- Box Score

Game information

**First quarter**

- SF – Jeff Garcia 3-yard run (Todd Peterson kick), 12:17. 49ers 7–0. **Drive: 5 plays, 73 yards, 2:43.**
- SF – Terrell Owens 1-yard pass from Jeff Garcia (Todd Peterson kick), 0:05. 49ers 14–0. **Drive: 6 plays, 56 yards, 3:11.**

**Second quarter**

- SF – Tai Streets 18-yard pass from Jeff Garcia (Todd Peterson kick), 11:33. 49ers 21–0. **Drive: 3 plays, 63 yards, 1:28.**
- SF – Cedrick Wilson 27-yard pass from Jeff Garcia (kick failed), 7:13. 49ers 27–0. **Drive: 5 plays, 41 yards, 2:08.**
- SF – Terrell Owens 2-yard pass from Jeff Garcia (Todd Peterson kick), 0:33. 49ers 34–0. **Drive: 5 plays, 50 yards, 1:06.**

**Third quarter**

- SF – Team safety, 9:27. 49ers 36–0.
- ARI – James Hodgins 3-yard pass from Josh McCown (Neil Rackers kick), 5:01. 49ers 36–7. **Drive: 6 plays, 66 yards, 2:41.**
- SF – Jeff Garcia 4-yard run (Todd Peterson kick), 2:40. 49ers 43–7. **Drive: 5 plays, 41 yards, 2:21.**

**Fourth quarter**

- SF – Kevan Barlow 46-yard run (Todd Peterson kick), 14:51. 49ers 50–7. **Drive: 4 plays, 64 yards, 1:43.**
- ARI – Anquan Boldin 16-yard pass from Josh McCown (Neil Rackers kick), 2:01. 49ers 50–14. **Drive: 15 plays, 94 yards, 6:42.**

**Top passers**

- ARI – Josh McCown – 11/20, 120 yards, 2 TD
- SF – Jeff Garcia – 19/28, 252 yards, 4 TD

**Top rushers**

- ARI – Marcel Shipp – 13 rushes, 30 yards
- SF – Kevan Barlow – 18 rushes, 154 yards, TD

**Top receivers**

- ARI – Anquan Boldin – 9 receptions, 123 yards, TD
- SF – Terrell Owens – 7 receptions, 92 yards, 2 TD

==== Week 15: vs. Carolina Panthers ====
Week 15: Carolina Panthers at Arizona Cardinals – Game summary

Quarter	1	2	3	4	Total
**Panthers**	7	0	3	10	**20**
Cardinals	7	7	0	3	**17**

at Sun Devil Stadium, Tempe, Arizona

- Date: December 14
- Game time: 2:15 p.m. MST
- Game weather: 63 °F (17 °C)
- Game attendance: 23,217
- Referee: Larry Nemmers
- Box Score

Game information

**First quarter**

- CAR – Mike Minter 35-yard interception return (John Kasay kick), 11:24. Panthers 7–0.
- ARI – Josh McCown 16-yard run (Neil Rackers kick), 0:36. Tied 7–7. **Drive: 10 plays, 80 yards, 5:33.**

**Second quarter**

- ARI – Emmitt Smith 4-yard run (Neil Rackers kick), 6:04. Cardinals 14–7. **Drive: 10 plays, 59 yards, 7:02.**

**Third quarter**

- CAR – John Kasay 21-yard field goal, 6:01. Cardinals 14–10. **Drive: 6 plays, 67 yards, 2:31.**

**Fourth quarter**

- CAR – DeShaun Foster 31-yard pass from Jake Delhomme (John Kasay kick), 11:29. Panthers 17–14. **Drive: 9 plays, 93 yards, 4:59.**
- ARI – Neil Rackers 44-yard field goal, 1:09. Tied 17–17. **Drive: 13 plays, 44 yards, 5:45.**
- CAR – John Kasay 49-yard field goal, 0:04. Panthers 20–17. **Drive: 9 plays, 49 yards, 1:05.**

**Top passers**

- CAR – Jake Delhomme – 20/32, 236 yards, TD, INT
- ARI – Josh McCown – 14/25, 172 yards, INT

**Top rushers**

- CAR – Stephen Davis – 13 rushes, 48 yards
- ARI – Marcel Shipp – 23 rushes, 89 yards

**Top receivers**

- CAR – Steve Smith Sr. – 9 receptions, 99 yards
- ARI – Anquan Boldin – 7 receptions, 73 yards

==== Week 16: at Seattle Seahawks ====
Week 16: Arizona Cardinals at Seattle Seahawks – Game summary

Quarter	1	2	3	4	Total
Cardinals	0	3	0	7	**10**
**Seahawks**	14	7	0	7	**28**

at Seahawks Stadium, Seattle, Washington

- Date: December 21
- Game time: 1:15 p.m. PST/2:15 p.m. MST
- Game weather: 49 °F (9 °C)
- Game attendance: 64,899
- Referee: Bill Leavy
- Box Score

Game information

**First quarter**

- SEA – Shaun Alexander 9-yard run (Josh Brown kick), 9:58. Seahawks 7–0. **Drive: 12 plays, 72 yards, 5:02.**
- SEA – Maurice Morris 4-yard pass from Matt Hasselbeck (Josh Brown kick), 0:59. Seahawks 14–0. **Drive: 5 plays, 45 yards, 2:20.**

**Second quarter**

- ARI – Neil Rackers 49-yard field goal, 12:42. Seahawks 14–3. **Drive: 8 plays, 54 yards, 3:17.**
- SEA – Shaun Alexander 44-yard run (Josh Brown kick), 11:06. Seahawks 21–3. **Drive: 4 plays, 80 yards, 1:36.**

**Third quarter**

- No scoring plays

**Fourth quarter**

- ARI – Anquan Boldin 60-yard pass from Josh McCown (Neil Rackers kick), 12:49. Seahawks 21–10. **Drive: 2 plays, 70 yards, 0:48.**
- SEA – Bobby Engram 3-yard pass from Trent Dilfer (Josh Brown kick), 3:12. Seahawks 28–10. **Drive: 10 plays, 41 yards, 4:55.**

**Top passers**

- ARI – Josh McCown – 25/40, 274 yards, TD
- SEA – Matt Hasselbeck – 17/24, 179 yards, TD, INT

**Top rushers**

- ARI – Josh McCown – 8 rushes, 38 yards
- SEA – Shaun Alexander – 21 rushes, 134 yards, 2 TD

**Top receivers**

- ARI – Anquan Boldin – 10 receptions, 122 yards, TD
- SEA – Itula Mili – 6 receptions, 70 yards

==== Week 17: vs. Minnesota Vikings ====
Week 17: Minnesota Vikings at Arizona Cardinals – Game summary

Quarter	1	2	3	4	Total
Vikings	0	0	7	10	**17**
**Cardinals**	3	3	0	12	**18**

at Sun Devil Stadium, Tempe, Arizona

- Date: December 28
- Game time: 2:15 p.m. MST
- Game weather: 51 °F (11 °C)
- Game attendance: 52,734
- Referee: Tony Corrente
- Box Score

Game information

**First quarter**

- ARI – Neil Rackers 22-yard field goal, 0:51. Cardinals 3–0. **Drive: 14 plays, 94 yards, 8:00.**

**Second quarter**

- ARI – Neil Rackers 26-yard field goal, 0:19. Cardinals 6–0. **Drive: 4 plays, 5 yards, 0:23.**

**Third quarter**

- MIN – Moe Williams 1-yard run (Aaron Elling kick), 7:08. Vikings 7–6. **Drive: 8 plays, 67 yards, 4:39.**

**Fourth quarter**

- MIN – Randy Moss 7-yard pass from Daunte Culpepper (Aaron Elling kick), 8:54. Vikings 14–6. **Drive: 11 plays, 57 yards, 5:56.**
- MIN – Aaron Elling 46-yard field goal, 6:48. Vikings 17–6. **Drive: 4 plays, 1 yard, 1:53.**
- ARI – Steve Bush 2-yard pass from Josh McCown (pass failed), 1:54. Vikings 17–12. **Drive: 14 plays, 60 yards, 4:54.**
- ARI – Nate Poole 28-yard pass from Josh McCown (run failed), 0:00. Cardinals 18–17. **Drive: 6 plays, 61 yards, 1:54.**

**Top passers**

- MIN – Daunte Culpepper – 18/28, 197 yards, TD, INT
- ARI – Josh McCown – 20/33, 224 yards, 2 TD, INT

**Top rushers**

- MIN – Michael Bennett – 12 rushes, 63 yards
- ARI – Josh McCown – 3 rushes, 27 yards

**Top receivers**

- MIN – Randy Moss – 5 receptions, 56 yards, TD
- ARI – Nate Poole – 5 receptions, 86 yards, TD

Trailing 17–6, the Cardinals managed to mount a 12-point comeback win over Vikings, which included a game winning "force out" 28-yard touchdown pass from Josh McCown to Nate Poole.

=== Standings ===
NFC West
	W	L	T	PCT	DIV	CONF	PF	PA	STK
^{(2)} St. Louis Rams	12	4	0	.750	4–2	8–4	447	328	L1
^{(5)} Seattle Seahawks	10	6	0	.625	5–1	8–4	404	327	W2
San Francisco 49ers	7	9	0	.438	2–4	6–6	384	337	L1
Arizona Cardinals	4	12	0	.250	1–5	3–9	225	452	W1

== Awards and honors ==
- Anquan Boldin, Associated Press Offensive Rookie of the Year
