= Freddie Jones (American football) =

American football player (born 1974)

No. 88, 85
- Position: Tight end

Personal information
- Born: September 16, 1974 (age 52); Cheverly, Maryland, U.S.
- Listed height: 6 ft 4 in (1.93 m)
- Listed weight: 260 lb (118 kg)

Career information
- High school: McKinley (Washington, DC)
- College: North Carolina
- NFL draft: 1997: 2nd round, 45th overall pick

Career history
- San Diego Chargers (1997–2001); Arizona Cardinals (2002–2004); Carolina Panthers (2005)*
- * Offseason or practice squad member only

Awards and highlights
- 2× First-team All-ACC (1995, 1996)

Career NFL statistics
- Receptions: 404
- Receiving yards: 4,232
- Touchdowns: 22
- Stats at Pro Football Reference

Freddie Ray Jones Jr. (born September 16, 1974) is an American former professional football player who was a tight end in the National Football League (NFL). He played college football for the North Carolina Tar Heels and was selected by the San Diego Chargers with their second round pick (45th overall) in the 1997 NFL draft. Jones became one of the best tight ends in the league in his 5 years with the Chargers. On November 4, 2001, he caught Drew Brees's first touchdown pass. Before the 2002 season he signed with the Arizona Cardinals, where he played for 3 years. He then signed with the Carolina Panthers before the 2005 season, but never played. On August 7, 2005, he announced his retirement at the age of 30, with 404 receptions for 4232 yards and 22 touchdowns.

== NFL career statistics ==
Legend
**Bold**	Career high

Year	Team	Games		Receiving				
Year	Team	GP	GS	Rec	Yds	Avg	Lng	TD
1997	SDG	13	8	41	505	**12.3**	**62**	2
1998	SDG	16	16	57	602	10.6	28	3
1999	SDG	16	16	56	670	12.0	36	2
2000	SDG	16	16	**71**	**766**	10.8	44	**5**
2001	SDG	14	9	35	388	11.1	34	4
2002	ARI	16	16	44	358	8.1	24	1
2003	ARI	16	16	55	517	9.4	34	3
2004	ARI	16	15	45	426	9.5	40	2
Career		123	112	404	4,232	10.5	62	22
