= Michael Young (linebacker) =

American football player and scout (born 1978)

Los Angeles Rams
- Title: Pro scout

Personal information
- Born: June 1, 1978 (age 48); St. Louis, Missouri, U.S.
- Listed height: 6 ft 2 in (1.88 m)
- Listed weight: 245 lb (111 kg)

Career information
- Position: Linebacker (No. 53)
- High school: Hazelwood East (St. Louis)
- College: Illinois (1997–2000)
- NFL draft: 2001: undrafted

Career history

Playing
- Arizona Cardinals (2001–2004); Detroit Lions (2004)*
- * Offseason or practice squad member only

Operations
- Lindenwood (2017–2018) Football operations assistant and Recruiting analyst; New York Jets (2018) Scouting fellow; Los Angeles Rams (2020–2024) Scouting apprentice; Los Angeles Rams (2025–present) Pro scout

Awards and highlights
- Super Bowl champion (LVI)

Career NFL statistics
- Games played: 22
- Games started: 2
- Total tackles: 34
- Return yards: 22
- Stats at Pro Football Reference

Michael Young (born June 1, 1978) is an American former professional football linebacker who is currently a scout for the Los Angeles Rams of the National Football League (NFL). He played college football for the Illinois Fighting Illini. Young played for the Arizona Cardinals and Detroit Lions from 2001 to 2004.

== College career ==
Young played for the Illinois Fighting Illini from 1997 to 2000. He missed his first season in 1996 due to an injury and redshirted. In 1997, Young made 83 tackles, including five tackles for loss and two sacks. In his senior season, he was named a preseason Butkus Award candidate. Young made 56 tackles in his final year.

== Professional career ==
=== Arizona Cardinals ===
After not being selected in the 2001 NFL draft, Young signed with the Arizona Cardinals as an undrafted free agent. He was released on August 27, 2001, as part of final roster cut downs. Young signed to the practice squad on September 3 and spent the rest of the season there.

Young made the active roster at the start of the 2002 season, playing in all 16 games and starting in two. He recorded 30 total tackles, including two tackles for loss and 22 return yards.

Young played in the first game of the 2003 season, making one tackle before being released by the Caridnals on September 12. He then re-signed with the team on November 19, 2003. Young played in five further games registering three more tackles. On August 23, 2004, he was released by the Cardinals.

=== Detroit Lions ===
On August 25, 2004, Young was picked up off waivers by the Detroit Lions. He was released on September 5, 2004.

== Post-playing career ==
After finishing his playing career, Young was an on-air analyst for 101 ESPN, covering the St. Louis Rams. He later worked on college broadcasts for the Lindenwood Lions.

== Administrative career ==
=== Lindenwood Lions ===
Young was a football operations assistant and recruiting analyst at Lindenwood for two seasons from 2017–2018.

=== New York Jets ===
In 2018, Young was a Nunn-Wooten Scouting Fellow for the New York Jets. There, he learned how scouting departments and front offices operate. Following this, Young served as a scout in the Midwest and Midlands area for the Reese's Senior Bowl in 2019. In doing so, he became the first NFL player to scout for the Senior Bowl.

=== Los Angeles Rams ===
In March 2020, Young joined the Los Angeles Rams as a scouting apprentice. He spent five seasons assisting with the north, northeast, Midwest and west U.S. regions. On March 12, 2025, it was announced that Young had been promoted to a pro scout.
