= Ronald McKinnon (American football) =

American football player (born 1973)

No. 57, 59
- Position: Linebacker

Personal information
- Born: September 20, 1973 (age 53); Fort Rucker, Alabama, U.S.
- Listed height: 6 ft 0 in (1.83 m)
- Listed weight: 246 lb (112 kg)

Career information
- College: North Alabama
- NFL draft: 1996: undrafted

Career history
- Arizona Cardinals (1996–2004); New Orleans Saints (2005)

Awards and highlights
- 3× NCAA Division II champion (1993, 1994, 1995); Harlon Hill Trophy (1995); 3× First-team All-American (1993, 1994, 1995); Alabama Sports Hall of Fame (2010)

Career NFL statistics
- Tackles: 1,011
- Sacks: 12
- Forced fumbles: 12
- Interceptions: 10
- Touchdowns: 2
- Stats at Pro Football Reference
- College Football Hall of Fame

Ronald Keith McKinnon (born September 20, 1973) is an American former professional football player who was a linebacker in the National Football League (NFL). He was originally signed as an undrafted free agent by the Arizona Cardinals out of the University of North Alabama where he won three Division II National Championships. He was the winner of 1995 Harlon Hill Trophy (Division II's equivalent to the Heisman Trophy). He played for the Cardinals from 1996 to 2004. He also played one season for the New Orleans Saints. In 2008, he was inducted into the College Football Hall of Fame.

== Early life ==
McKinnon attended at Elba High School in Elba, Alabama and led the Tigers to the 1989 State Championship.

== Professional career ==
Post playing career, in the year 2011, Ronald became a collegiate football coach. His first coaching job was for the, now defunct, Birmingham–Southern College and was the Linebackers Coach for the BSC Panthers. He is currently the Linebackers Coach for HBCU Miles College, The Golden Bears.

=== Arizona Cardinals ===
He was signed as a free agent in 1996 season by the Arizona Cardinals.

== NFL career statistics ==
Legend
	Led the league
**Bold**	Career high

=== Regular season ===
Year	Team	Games		Tackles				Interceptions				Fumbles			
Year	Team	GP	GS	Comb	Solo	Ast	Sck	Int	Yds	TD	Lng	FF	FR	Yds	TD
1996	ARI	16	0	7	6	1	0.0	0	0	0	0	0	0	0	0
1997	ARI	16	16	97	61	36	1.0	3	**40**	0	17	1	0	0	0
1998	ARI	13	13	95	66	29	2.0	**5**	25	0	17	**3**	**2**	0	0
1999	ARI	16	16	143	98	45	1.0	1	0	0	0	**3**	1	0	0
2000	ARI	16	16	**157**	**119**	38	**4.0**	0	0	0	0	2	1	0	0
2001	ARI	16	16	146	98	**48**	2.0	1	24	**1**	**24**	1	**2**	**25**	**1**
2002	ARI	16	16	108	67	41	0.0	0	0	0	0	0	0	0	0
2003	ARI	16	16	106	81	25	2.0	0	0	0	0	2	1	0	0
2004	ARI	16	10	74	49	25	0.0	0	0	0	0	0	0	0	0
2005	NOR	16	9	78	61	17	0.0	0	0	0	0	0	0	0	0
		157	128	1,011	706	305	12.0	10	89	1	24	12	7	25	1

=== Playoffs ===
Year	Team	Games		Tackles				Interceptions				Fumbles			
Year	Team	GP	GS	Comb	Solo	Ast	Sck	Int	Yds	TD	Lng	FF	FR	Yds	TD
1998	ARI	2	2	10	9	1	1.0	0	0	0	0	0	0	0	0
		2	2	10	9	1	1.0	0	0	0	0	0	0	0	0
