= Russell Davis (defensive tackle) =

American football player (born 1975)

No. 95, 98, 99
- Position: Defensive tackle

Personal information
- Born: March 28, 1975 (age 51); Fayetteville, North Carolina, U.S.
- Listed height: 6 ft 4 in (1.93 m)
- Listed weight: 306 lb (139 kg)

Career information
- High school: E. E. Smith (Fayetteville)
- College: North Carolina
- NFL draft: 1999: 2nd round, 49th overall pick

Career history
- Chicago Bears (1999); Arizona Cardinals (2000–2005); Seattle Seahawks (2006); New York Giants (2007)

Awards and highlights
- Super Bowl champion (XLII); NFL All-Rookie Team (1999)

Career NFL statistics
- Total tackles: 286
- Sacks: 11.5
- Forced fumbles: 3
- Fumble recoveries: 2
- Pass deflections: 12
- Stats at Pro Football Reference

Russell Morgan Davis (born March 28, 1975) is an American former professional football player who was a defensive tackle in the National Football League (NFL). He played college football for the North Carolina Tar Heels. The Chicago Bears selected Davis in the second round and 49th overall in the 1999 NFL draft, and he played the 1999 season for the Bears. Davis then played for the Arizona Cardinals from 2000 to 2005, the Seattle Seahawks in 2006, and the New York Giants in 2007 and won the Super Bowl XLII title with the Giants that year.

== Early life and college ==
Davis graduated in 1994 from E. E. Smith High School in his birthplace of Fayetteville, North Carolina, and Davis was an All-State selection as a two-way lineman. He then attended the University of North Carolina at Chapel Hill, and played for the Tar Heels from 1995 to 1998 after redshirting the 1994 season. In 22 games started for North Carolina, Davis had 10.5 sacks and was in the same defensive line as 1998 NFL draft picks Greg Ellis and Vonnie Holliday.

In his freshman season (1995), Davis had 46 tackles and three sacks in eight starts. In 1996 as a sophomore, Davis had 27 tackles and 2.5 sacks. In 1997 as a junior, Davis had 60 tackles and three sacks in 10 games (with 9 starts). Ellis played only two games as a senior in 1998 due to an ankle injury but had 36 tackles and two sacks for the year.

== Professional career ==
=== Chicago Bears (1999) ===
In the 1999 NFL draft, the Chicago Bears selected Davis in the second round, 49th overall. As a rookie in 1999, Davis played in 11 games with 8 starts and made 13 tackles and 2 sacks. Davis made his first NFL career sack on September 12, 1999, to Kansas City Chiefs quarterback Elvis Grbac.

=== Arizona Cardinals (2000–2005) ===
The Arizona Cardinals acquired Davis off waivers after the Bears cut Davis. Davis made 30 tackles and a forced fumble in 2000 with Arizona in 14 games with 9 starts. Davis' first full season of 16 starts in 16 games was in 2001; he had a career-best 54 tackles on the season, 2 sacks, and deflected a pass. Again in 2002 Davis played and started all 16 games in the regular season. He made 44 tackles, 2 sacks, and 2 passes defended. In 2003, playing and starting 15 games, Davis made 37 tackles, 1 sack, 2 passes defended, and a forced fumble. In 2004, Davis made 49 tackles, 1 sack, 3 passes defended, and 1 forced fumble in 16 games (all starts). After starting the first three games of 2005, Davis spent the rest of the year on injured reserve due to a left biceps injury. Davis made 5 tackles in 2005.

=== Seattle Seahawks (2006) ===
In 13 games (no starts), Davis made 30 tackles and 3 sacks with the Seattle Seahawks in 2006.

=== New York Giants (2007) ===
In his final NFL season, Davis played 11 games with the New York Giants in 2007. He had 5 tackles and 2 passes deflected. He played two playoff games, and the Giants later won Super Bowl XLII.
