= Bryan Gilmore =

American football player (born 1978)

No. 11, 81, 82, 84, 86
- Position: Wide receiver

Personal information
- Born: January 21, 1978 (age 48); Lufkin, Texas, U.S.
- Listed height: 6 ft 1 in (1.85 m)
- Listed weight: 200 lb (91 kg)

Career information
- High school: Lufkin
- College: Midwestern State (1997–1999)
- NFL draft: 2000: undrafted

Career history
- Arizona Cardinals (2000–2003); → Barcelona Dragons (2001); Miami Dolphins (2004–2005); San Francisco 49ers (2006–2007); Seattle Seahawks (2008)*
- * Offseason or practice squad member only

Career NFL statistics
- Receptions: 53
- Receiving yards: 794
- Receiving touchdowns: 5
- Stats at Pro Football Reference

Bryan Leonelle Gilmore (born January 21, 1978) is an American former professional football player who was a wide receiver in the National Football League (NFL). He played college football for the Midwestern State Mustangs in Wichita Falls, Texas. Gilmore was signed by the Arizona Cardinals as an undrafted free agent in 2000, and has also played for the Miami Dolphins and San Francisco 49ers.

== Early life ==
Gilmore attended Lufkin High School and was a student and a letterman in football. In football, he won All-District honors. He graduated in 1996.

== Professional career ==
=== Arizona Cardinals ===
He was signed as an undrafted free agent by the Arizona Cardinals in 2000. He was sent to NFL Europe by the Cardinals in 2000. He played for the Cardinals until 2004.

=== Miami Dolphins ===
He played for the Miami Dolphins in 2004 and 2005.

=== San Francisco 49ers ===
He was signed as a free agent by the 49ers in 2006. On September 1, 2007, he was released by the 49ers, but was re-signed on October 2.

=== Seattle Seahawks ===
On July 25, 2008, Gilmore was signed by the Seattle Seahawks. He was released on August 30, 2008.

== NFL career statistics ==
Legend
| **Bold** | Career high |

| Year | Team | Games | | Receiving | | | | | |
| Year | Team | GP | GS | Tgt | Rec | Yds | Avg | Lng | TD |
|---|---|---|---|---|---|---|---|---|---|
| 2000 | ARI | 1 | 0 | 0 | 0 | 0 | 0.0 | 0 | 0 |
| 2001 | ARI | 2 | 0 | 0 | 0 | 0 | 0.0 | 0 | 0 |
| 2002 | ARI | 7 | 0 | 4 | 1 | 14 | 14.0 | 14 | 0 |
| 2003 | ARI | 14 | **10** | **45** | **17** | **208** | 12.2 | 32 | **2** |
| 2004 | MIA | **16** | 2 | 34 | 15 | 206 | 13.7 | 37 | 1 |
| 2005 | MIA | 15 | 1 | 20 | 5 | 105 | **21.0** | 44 | 1 |
| 2006 | SFO | **16** | 3 | 31 | 8 | 150 | 18.8 | **75** | 1 |
| 2007 | SFO | 10 | 0 | 19 | 7 | 111 | 15.9 | 42 | 0 |
| | | 81 | 16 | 153 | 53 | 794 | 15.0 | 75 | 5 |
