= Raynoch Thompson =

American football player (born 1977)

No. 55
- Position: Linebacker

Personal information
- Born: November 21, 1977 (age 48); Los Angeles, California, U.S.
- Listed height: 6 ft 3 in (1.91 m)
- Listed weight: 228 lb (103 kg)

Career information
- High school: St. Augustine (New Orleans, Louisiana)
- College: Tennessee
- NFL draft: 2000: 2nd round, 41st overall pick

Career history
- Arizona Cardinals (2000–2004); Greenbay Packers (2005)*
- * Offseason or practice squad member only

Awards and highlights
- BCS national champion (1998); First-team All-American (1999); 2× First-team All-SEC (1998, 1999)

Career NFL statistics
- Games played: 64
- Tackles: 333
- Sacks: 7.5
- Stats at Pro Football Reference

Raynoch Joseph Thompson (born November 21, 1977) is an American former professional football player who was a linebacker in the National Football League (NFL). He played college football for the Tennessee Volunteers and was selected by the Arizona Cardinals in the second round (45th overall) of the 2000 NFL draft. He spent 5 years for the Cardinals, until they released him at the end of the 2004 season. After his time with the Cardinals, he signed with the Green Bay Packers, but they cut him before the season. He was an All-American and a Butkus Award finalist in 1997 and 1998. He was an important part of the University of Tennessee national championship team that went undefeated in 1998.

== NFL career statistics ==
Legend
**Bold**	Career high

Year	Team	Games		Tackles					Interceptions					Fumbles			
Year	Team	GP	GS	Cmb	Solo	Ast	Sck	TFL	Int	Yds	TD	Lng	PD	FF	FR	Yds	TD
2000	ARI	11	9	52	36	16	0.0	4	0	0	0	0	0	0	0	0	0
2001	ARI	14	14	83	62	21	0.5	5	0	0	0	0	0	**1**	0	0	0
2002	ARI	**16**	**16**	**110**	**77**	**33**	**3.0**	**11**	0	0	0	0	**3**	0	0	0	0
2003	ARI	12	12	63	54	9	**3.0**	3	0	0	0	0	2	**1**	**1**	0	0
2004	ARI	11	3	37	24	13	1.0	2	0	0	0	0	2	0	0	0	0
Career		64	54	345	253	92	7.5	25	0	0	0	0	7	2	1	0	0
