= Eric Joyce (American football) =

American football player (born 1978)

No. 38
- Position: Defensive back

Personal information
- Born: November 21, 1978 (age 47); Nashville, Tennessee, U.S.
- Listed height: 5 ft 10 in (1.78 m)
- Listed weight: 200 lb (91 kg)

Career information
- High school: Whites Creek (TN)
- College: Tennessee State
- NFL draft: 2002: undrafted

Career history
- Arizona Cardinals (2002)*; Chicago Bears (2002); Arizona Cardinals (2004)*; Miami Dolphins (2004)*; Atlanta Falcons (2005)*; Washington Redskins (2005)*
- * Offseason or practice squad member only
- Stats at Pro Football Reference

Eric Torezi Joyce (born November 21, 1978) is an American former football defensive back in the National Football League (NFL), NFL Europe and Arena Football League (AFL). He played for the Chicago Bears of the NFL, the Frankfurt Galaxy of NFLE, and the Nashville Kats of the AFL. Joyce played college football at Tennessee State.
