= Jake Soliday =

American football player (born 1978)

No. 18
- Position: Wide receiver

Personal information
- Born: November 16, 1978 (age 47); Mansfield, Ohio
- Listed height: 6 ft 1 in (1.85 m)
- Listed weight: 200 lb (91 kg)

Career information
- High school: Mansfield
- College: Northern Iowa
- NFL draft: 2002: undrafted

Career history
- Arizona Cardinals (2002)
- Stats at Pro Football Reference

Jacob M. Soliday (born November 16, 1978) is an American former football wide receiver who played for the Arizona Cardinals of the National Football League (NFL). He played college football at University of Northern Iowa.

== Early life and education ==
Soliday was born November 16, 1978, in Mansfield, Ohio. His father, Jack Soliday, coached him in various youth sports and was a sports announcer for local teams. Soliday graduated from Mansfield Senior High School in 1997, then attended the University of Northern Iowa with a full-ride scholarship.

== College career ==
While attending the University of Northern Iowa, Soliday played for the university's football team. While there, he completed the fourth-most number of career receptions (147) in the school's history. He was also a member of the all-Gateway Conference first team.

== Club career ==
In 2002, Soliday was selected to play for the Arizona Cardinals as an undrafted rookie free agent. He appeared in four games.

== Personal life ==
Soliday lives in Chandler, Arizona with his family and is a firefighter for the Chandler Fire Department.
