= Nate Dwyer =

American football player (born 1978)

No. 72
- Position: Defensive tackle

Personal information
- Born: September 30, 1978 (age 48); Stillwater, Minnesota, U.S.
- Listed height: 6 ft 3 in (1.91 m)
- Listed weight: 316 lb (143 kg)

Career information
- High school: Stillwater
- College: Kansas (1997–2001)
- NFL draft: 2002: 4th round, 113th overall pick

Career history
- Arizona Cardinals (2002); Seattle Seahawks (2004)*
- * Offseason or practice squad member only

Awards and highlights
- First-team All-Big 12 (2001); Second-team All-Big 12 (2000)

Nate Dwyer (born September 30, 1978) is an American former professional football defensive tackle. He played college football for the Kansas Jayhawks and was selected by the Arizona Cardinals of the National Football League (NFL) in the fourth round of the 2002 NFL draft. Dwyer was also a member of the Seattle Seahawks.

== Early life ==
Dwyer was born September 30, 1978 in Stillwater, Minnesota. He attended Stillwater Area High School.

== College career ==
Dwyer played college football for the Kansas Jayhawks from 1998 to 2001 after redshirting in 1997. He wore jersey number 92 at Kansas. He was selected second-team All-Big 12 in 2000 and first-team All-Big 12 in 2001. He recorded 17 quarterback sacks in his career at Kansas, which was tied for sixth in Kansas Jayhawks history as of 2023. He recorded 51 tackles, forced two fumbles, and recovered two fumbles in his final season at Kansas. He was invited to participate in the 2002 Senior Bowl.

Dwyer took his final semester off of school to prepare for the 2002 NFL draft.

== Professional career ==
Dwyer was selected by the Arizona Cardinals in the fourth round (113th overall) of the 2002 NFL draft. He received the call confirming he would be selected by the Cardinals from vaunted former Pittsburgh Steelers player Mean Joe Greene, who was serving as the Cardinals' defensive line coach at the time.

On February 5, 2004, Dwyer was signed by the Seattle Seahawks.

== Personal life ==
Dwyer was a Dallas Cowboys fan as a child. He studied communications at the University of Kansas.

Dwyer was inducted into the St. Croix Valley hall of fame, a region including his alma mater Stillwater Area High School, in 2015.
