= Stan Kwan =

American football coach (1967–2021)

Personal information
- Born: November 2, 1967; Phoenix, Arizona, U.S.
- Died: November 30, 2021 (aged 54)

Career information
- High school: Camelback (Phoenix, Arizona)
- College: San Diego State

Career history
- San Diego Chargers (1991) Assistant Special Teams Coach; San Diego Chargers (1992) Assistant Special Teams Coach / Coaching Staff Assistant; San Diego Chargers (1993–1996) Assistant Special Teams Coach; Detroit Lions (1997–1998) Offensive Assistant Coach / Assistant Special Teams Coach; Detroit Lions (1999–2000) Assistant Special Teams Coach; Arizona Cardinals (2001–2003) Defensive Quality Control Coach / Special Teams Assistant Coach; Detroit Lions (2004–2006) Assistant Special Teams Coach; Detroit Lions (2007–2009) Special Teams Coach; Buffalo Bills (2010–2012) Assistant Special Teams Coach; New Orleans Saints (2013–2016) Assistant Special Teams Coach; San Francisco 49ers (2017–2020) Assistant Special Teams Coach

Stanley Dean Kwan (November 2, 1967 – November 30, 2021) was an American professional football coach.

== Early life ==
A Phoenix, Arizona native, Kwan played college baseball at San Diego State University prior to his coaching career.

== Coaching career ==
=== New Orleans Saints ===
Kwan was hired by the New Orleans Saints on February 8, 2013. It was his 23rd year of coaching in the NFL. Kwan was fired on January 5, 2017.

=== San Francisco 49ers ===
Kwan was hired by the San Francisco 49ers on February 21, 2017.

== Death ==
Kwan died in his sleep from a heart attack on November 30, 2021. The Detroit Lions and San Francisco 49ers both made statements upon his death.
