= Coby Rhinehart =

American gridiron football player (born 1977)

Profile
- Position: Cornerback

Personal information
- Born: February 7, 1977 (age 49); Dallas, Texas, U.S.

Career information
- College: Southern Methodist
- NFL draft: 1999: 6th round, 190th overall pick

Career history
- 1999–2003: Arizona Cardinals
- 2006: Calgary Stampeders
- 2007: Montreal Alouettes

Awards and highlights
- CFL All-Star (2006); CFL West All-Star (2006)
- Stats at Pro Football Reference

Jacoby Rhinehart (born February 7, 1977) is an American former professional football cornerback who played in for the Arizona Cardinals and defensive back for the Montreal Alouettes of the Canadian Football League (CFL). He was selected in the sixth round (190th overall) in the 1999 NFL draft.
