= Nate Poole =

American football player and coach (born 1977)

North Carolina A&T Aggies
- Title: Wide receivers coach

Personal information
- Born: February 1, 1977 (age 49); Danville, Virginia, U.S.
- Listed height: 6 ft 2 in (1.88 m)
- Listed weight: 204 lb (93 kg)

Career information
- High school: George Washington (Danville)
- College: Marshall (1997–2000)
- NFL draft: 2001: undrafted

Career history

Playing
- Arizona Cardinals (2001–2004); New Orleans Saints (2005)

Coaching
- Wingate (2018–2019) Wide receivers coach; North Carolina A&T (2020–present) Wide receivers coach

Awards and highlights
- 2× First-team All-MAC (1999, 2000)

Career NFL statistics
- Receptions: 34
- Receiving yards: 418
- Receiving touchdowns: 2
- Stats at Pro Football Reference

Nathan Poole (born February 1, 1977) is an American college football coach and former wide receiver. He is the wide receivers coach for North Carolina A&T State University, a position he has held since 2020. He was originally signed by the Arizona Cardinals of the National Football League (NFL) as an undrafted free agent in 2001. He played college football at Marshall.

Poole is best known for his game-winning touchdown that eliminated the Minnesota Vikings from playoff contention in 2003.

== Professional career ==
=== Arizona Cardinals ===
Poole was signed by the Arizona Cardinals as a free agent on April 23, 2001. He was waived after training camp on September 1 but was re-signed to the practice squad on December 3, 2001. The Cardinals waived Poole again on September 26, 2002 but brought him back to the practice squad a month later on October 30 and signed him to the active roster November 6. Making his NFL debut on December 1, Poole played in five games with one start for the Cardinals in 2002, with 13 catches for 108 yards and a touchdown. His first NFL score came from quarterback Jake Plummer against the Detroit Lions on December 8. Poole appeared in five games (one start) his first season playing, catching 13 passes for 108 yards and a touchdown.

As an exclusive-rights free agent in 2003, Poole was tendered a contract re-signed. He was released by the team on August 31 but was re-signed to the active roster on September 12 and remained there the rest of the season. He appeared in 15 games and started one, catching 13 passes for a career-high 177 yards and one touchdown.

It was in the season finale on December 28 that Poole had his best game as a pro and became, at least for the moment, a household name. With the Minnesota Vikings leading 17-12 and needing a win to secure a playoff spot, Poole caught a 28-yard touchdown pass from quarterback Josh McCown with no time remaining to win the game and eliminate the Vikings from playoff contention. Poole finished the game with five catches for 86 yards - both career highs. Because of the Cardinals' win, the Packers made the playoffs. The city of Green Bay gave Poole the key to the city and invited him to attend the Packers' playoff game at Lambeau Field against the Seattle Seahawks. Poole was initially placed in a luxury box, but then decided to go out into the elements with the rest of the Packers fans.

Poole re-signed with the Cardinals on May 30, 2004 and began the season on the team's physically-unable-to-perform list. He made the team out of training camp once again and went on to play in nine games with one start. Poole finished the year with five catches for 70 yards.

=== New Orleans Saints ===
In the 2005 offseason, the Cardinals declined to tender a contract to Poole - a restricted free agent. He signed a two-year, $1 million contract with the New Orleans Saints on May 18. After being cut by the team on September 3, Poole was re-signed by the team less than three weeks later on September 21.

On November 6, Poole tore the ACL, MCL and patellar tendon in his knee against the Chicago Bears. He was placed on season-ending injured reserve, finishing the season with three catches for 63 yards in seven games.

Knee problems often kept Poole out of practice during training camp with the Saints in 2006, and he was eventually waived on July 26.

== Coaching career ==
In April 2018, Poole was named wide receivers coach for the Wingate Bulldogs football team.

In 2020, Poole was hired as the wide receivers coach for North Carolina A&T.
