= Teag Whiting =

American football player (born 1979)

No. 71
- Position: Tackle

Personal information
- Born: April 16, 1979 (age 47); Burley, Idaho, U.S.
- Listed height: 6 ft 3 in (1.91 m)
- Listed weight: 320 lb (145 kg)

Career information
- High school: Brighton (Cottonwood Heights, Utah)
- College: Ricks (1997–1998); BYU (1999–2001)
- NFL draft: 2002: undrafted

Career history

Playing
- Oakland Raiders (2002)*; New England Patriots (2002)*; Tennessee Titans (2002)*; Arizona Cardinals (2002–2003)
- * Offseason or practice squad member only

Coaching
- Southern Utah (2009) Graduate assistant; Southern Utah (2010–2012) Run game coordinator/Offensive line; Southern Utah (2013) Co-offensive coordinator/Run game coordinator; Southern Utah (2014) Assistant offensive line; Southern Utah (2015) Tight ends/Player personnel coordinator; Southern Utah (2016–2019) Assistant tight ends

Awards and highlights
- First-team NJCAA All-American (1998); First-team All-WSFL (1998)

Career NFL statistics
- Games played: 1
- Stats at Pro Football Reference

Teag Whiting (born April 16, 1979) is an American former professional football tackle and coach who played in the National Football League (NFL) for the Oakland Raiders, New England Patriots, Tennessee Titans and Arizona Cardinals. He played college football for the Ricks College Vikings and BYU Cougars. Whiting was an assistant coach for the Southern Utah Thunderbirds.

== Early life ==
Whiting was born on April 16, 1979, in Burley, Idaho. He attended Brighton High School in Cottonwood Heights, Utah. Whiting twice earned all-region and all-state honors in football. As a senior, he won the Utah state championship in wrestling.

== College career ==
Whiting played college football for the Ricks College Vikings from 1997 to 1998 and BYU Cougars from 1999 to 2001. He was a first-team All-WSFL and NJCAA All-American in 1998.

In 1999, Whiting transferred to Brigham Young University. He redshirted his first season and played the following two years at guard, earning honorable mention All-Mountain West in 2001.

== Professional career ==
=== Oakland Raiders ===
After going undrafted in the 2002 NFL draft, Whiting signed with the Oakland Raiders as an undrafted free agent. On August 26, 2002, he was waived by the team.

=== New England Patriots ===
On October 8, 2002, Whiting was signed by the New England Patriots to the practice squad. On October 21, he was released.

=== Tennessee Titans ===
On November 15, 2002, the Tennessee Titans signed Whiting to the practice squad. On November 23, he was released but re-signed on November 30.

=== Arizona Cardinals ===
On December 18, 2002, the Arizona Cardinals signed Whiting off the Titan's practice squad. He played one game for the team and became a free agent at the end of the season. On April 2, 2003, Whiting re-signed to the Cardinals on one-year contract. On August 26, he was placed on the injured reserve after a knee injury was discovered during his exit physical. Whiting spent the year on the injured reserve and became a free agent after the season ended.

== Coaching career ==
In 2009, Whiting began coaching at Southern Utah as a graduate assistant. He served in multiple roles including run game coordinator, co-offensive coordinator and assistant tight ends coach. On December 11, 2019, it was announced Whiting was not returning to the coaching staff.
