= Preston Parsons =

American football player (born 1979)

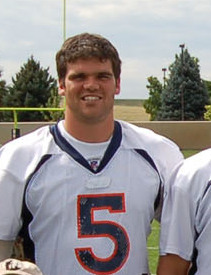
- Parsons with the Denver Broncos in 2006

No. 15, 5
- Position: Quarterback

Personal information
- Born: February 19, 1979 (age 47); Portland, Oregon, U.S.
- Listed height: 6 ft 4 in (1.93 m)
- Listed weight: 235 lb (107 kg)

Career information
- High school: Jesuit (Beaverton, Oregon)
- College: Northern Arizona
- NFL draft: 2002: undrafted

Career history
- Arizona Cardinals (2002–2003); Houston Texans (2005)*; Denver Broncos (2006)*; Tennessee Titans (2008)*
- * Offseason or practice squad member only

Preston Thomas Parsons (born February 19, 1979) is an American former football quarterback. He was originally signed by the Arizona Cardinals as an undrafted free agent in 2002. He played college football at Northern Arizona.

Parsons was also a member of the Houston Texans, Denver Broncos, and Tennessee Titans.

== Early life ==
Preston Parsons attended Jesuit High School in Portland, Oregon, graduating in 1997. While there he earned three varsity letters in football, two in basketball, and one each in baseball and golf. In football, he was a USA Today All-USA selection.

== College career ==
Parsons earned honorable mention All-Big Sky honors in 2001.

== Professional career ==
After going undrafted in the 2002 NFL draft, Parsons signed with the Arizona Cardinals on April 22, 2002. He was the Cardinals' third-string quarterback for all 16 games in both 2002 and 2003. However, he never played in a regular season NFL game. Parsons was released by Arizona on June 11, 2004.

Parsons signed with the Houston Texans on January 19, 2005. He was waived on August 1, re-signed on August 16, and waived again on September 3, 2005.

Parsons was signed to a futures contract by the Denver Broncos on January 3, 2006. He was waived on September 2 and signed to the Broncos' practice squad on September 4, 2006. He signed another futures contract with Denver on January 9, 2007. Parsons was later released on September 2, 2007.

Parsons was signed to the Tennessee Titans' practice squad on September 10, 2008. He was waived on October 8, 2008.

== Legal Issues ==
In 2024, Parsons was investigated by the U.S. Attorney’s Office for the District of Colorado due to a whistleblower report that he and his former neuromonitoring company violated the False Claims Act by arranging kickbacks for services. He entered into a settlement for $225,000 to resolve the allegations. This amount was based on Parsons financial condition and limited ability to pay the settlement. He had been previously removed from the neuromonitoring company in 2022, which he founded.
