= Tony Wragge =

American football player (born 1979)

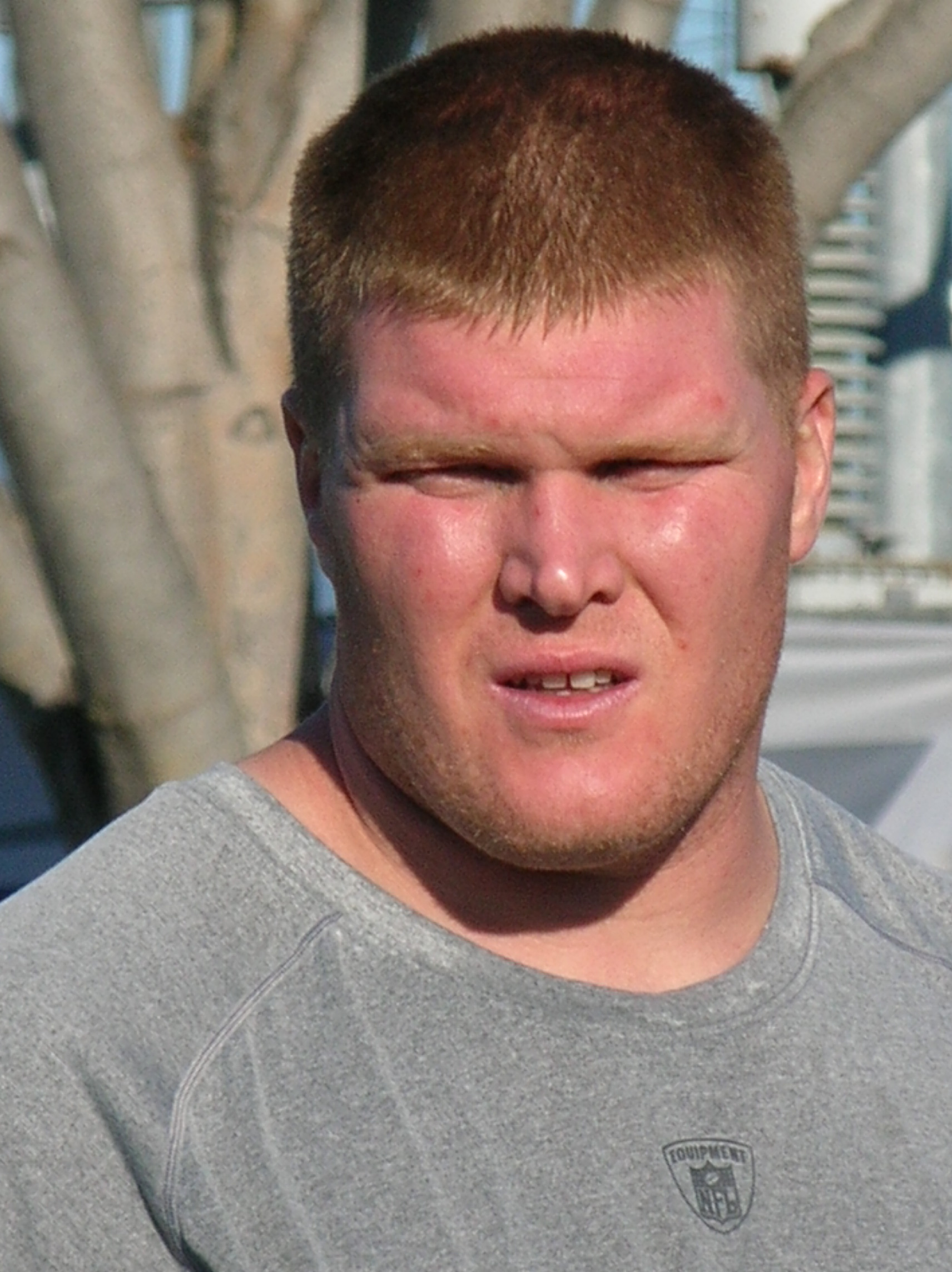
- Wragge in 2010

No. 68, 69, 64
- Position: Guard

Personal information
- Born: August 14, 1979 (age 47); Creighton, Nebraska, U.S.
- Listed height: 6 ft 4 in (1.93 m)
- Listed weight: 320 lb (145 kg)

Career information
- High school: Bloomfield Community (Bloomfield, Nebraska)
- College: New Mexico State (1998–2001)
- NFL draft: 2002: undrafted

Career history
- Arizona Cardinals (2002–2003); Los Angeles Avengers (2005); San Francisco 49ers (2005–2010); → Rhein Fire (2006); St. Louis Rams (2011); Baltimore Ravens (2012)*
- * Offseason or practice squad member only

Awards and highlights
- First-team All-Sun Belt (2001)

Career NFL statistics
- Games played: 82
- Games started: 23
- Stats at Pro Football Reference

Tony James Wragge (born August 14, 1979) is an American former professional football player who was a guard in the National Football League (NFL). He played college football for the New Mexico State Aggies and was signed by the Arizona Cardinals as an undrafted free agent after the 2002 NFL draft.

He also played for the San Francisco 49ers, the St. Louis Rams (where he played at center) and the Baltimore Ravens, and also for the Los Angeles Avengers of the Arena Football League (AFL).

== High school and college career ==
Wragge was an all-state selection as a junior and senior at Bloomfield Community High School in Bloomfield, Nebraska. He made the all-Northeast Nebraska Athletic Conference team twice, and was named Northeast Nebraska Player of the Year. In addition to high school football, he was also a weightlifter in high school, and owns the Nebraska state high school lifting records for deadlift (580 pounds), bench press (365 lbs.), and the overall mark of 1,400 pounds. Wragge attended New Mexico State University, where he started at right guard for three seasons. He made the All-Sun Belt Conference team twice. Wragge was inducted into the Aggie Sports Hall of Fame in 2012. He completed his bachelor's degree in individualized studies (health science) in August 2008, while playing in the NFL for the San Francisco 49ers.

== Professional career ==
=== Arizona Cardinals ===
Wragge signed with the Arizona Cardinals as an undrafted free agent in 2002, under head coach Dave McGinnis. He was signed to the Cardinals' practice squad in October 2002, then later promoted to the active roster. Wragge made his first NFL start in his rookie season on December 29, 2002, at left guard against the Denver Broncos in Denver, Colorado. In 2003, Wragge was placed on the Cardinals' practice squad and suffered a season-ending knee injury that landed him on the injured reserved list for the rest of the 2003 season. In 2004, Wragge attended training camp again with the Arizona Cardinals under the new head coach Dennis Green; he was released before the start of the 2004 regular season.

=== Los Angeles Avengers ===
He played in the Arena Football League in 2005 with the Los Angeles Avengers.

=== San Francisco 49ers ===
Wragge was picked up by the San Francisco 49ers before the 2005 NFL season but was released before the start of the season. Wragge was signed back to the active roster on November 28, 2005. He was then allocated to NFL Europe by the San Francisco 49ers for the spring 2006 NFL Europe season, playing for the Rhein Fire in Düsseldorf, Germany. Wragge started every game at right guard, was a team captain, and the team posted a 6–4 record missing a World Bowl appearance by one game. He was released by the 49ers on September 3, 2011.

=== St. Louis Rams ===
The next day, he signed with the St. Louis Rams.

=== Baltimore Ravens ===
Wragge was signed by the Baltimore Ravens on June 12, 2012. He attended training camp and was released before the 2012 regular NFL season on August 31, 2012.

=== Coaching ===
Wragge was named offensive line coach for the NFLPA Collegiate Bowl Game held on January 19, 2013.
