= L. J. Shelton =

American football player (born 1976)

No. 70
- Position: Offensive tackle

Personal information
- Born: March 21, 1976 (age 50); Corvallis, Oregon, U.S.
- Listed height: 6 ft 6 in (1.98 m)
- Listed weight: 345 lb (156 kg)

Career information
- College: Eastern Michigan
- NFL draft: 1999: 1st round, 21st overall pick

Career history
- Arizona Cardinals (1999–2004); Cleveland Browns (2005); Miami Dolphins (2006–2007); San Diego Chargers (2008)*
- * Offseason or practice squad member only

Awards and highlights
- Second-team All-American (1998); 2× first-team All-MAC (1997-1998)

Career NFL statistics
- Games played: 146
- Games started: 127
- Stats at Pro Football Reference

L. J. Shelton (born March 21, 1976) is an American former professional football player who was an offensive tackle for 10 seasons in the National Football League (NFL). He was selected by the Arizona Cardinals 21st overall in the 1999 NFL draft. He played college football at Eastern Michigan.

Shelton also played for the Cleveland Browns, Miami Dolphins, and San Diego Chargers.

== Early life ==
Shelton attended Rochester High School in Rochester Hills, Michigan where he lettered in football and basketball. Shelton played football in his early years but sat out the first half of his senior season to concentrate on basketball. When Shelton changed his mind and wanted to play football his senior season his teammates voted him back on the team and he joined them 4 games into the season. He was a co-captain on the basketball team.

== College career ==
Shelton was a four-year letterman (1995–1998) at Eastern Michigan who started his final three seasons at left tackle. As a junior, he protected the blind side of former NFL quarterback Charlie Batch. As a senior, he graded out at 90 percent for blocking consistency, as he registered a career-high 102 knockdowns for an offense that accumulated 3,985 yards. He was a second-team All-American pick by The Sports Network that year, and a first-team All-Mid-American Conference selection each of his final two seasons.

== Professional career ==
=== Arizona Cardinals ===
Shelton was selected with the 21st overall pick in the 1999 NFL draft by the Arizona Cardinals and then-head coach Vince Tobin. A contract holdout caused him to miss all of training camp, and he eventually signed his rookie contract on September 25 - two games into the regular season. The team received a roster exemption for two more games. He went on to play in nine games, including seven starts, making his NFL debut in a reserve role against the New York Giants on October 10. The first start of his NFL career came against the New England Patriots on October 31, and he proceeded to open seven games in a row. A sprained ankle sustained in second half at the Washington Redskins on December 12 forced him out of action the rest of the year.

Shelton started all 14 games in which he played at left tackle for the Cardinals in 2000, including each of the final 13. He sustained a sprained right knee in the season opener at the New York Giants on September 3 and was inactive the next two games. He was part of an offensive line that allowed just 35 sacks - the lowest total by a Cardinals team since 1994.

For the first time in his career, Shelton opened all 16 contests at left tackle in 2001. He participated in all 955 offensive snaps on the season and was a member of an offensive line that yielded just 29 sacks - the second-fewest by a Cardinals team in a 16-game season.

Shelton started all 16 games at left tackle in 2002, the second consecutive season in which he opened every contest and the only Arizona offensive lineman to achieve that feat in 2002. He took part in all but nine offensive snaps over the course of the year, and was part of a line that helped the Cardinals average 113.9 yards rushing per game and a 4.4-yard average per attempt.

In 2003, Shelton started the first 15 games of the season at left tackle for Arizona and took part in all 921 offensive snaps over that time. He sustained a sprained ankle at the Seattle Seahawks on December 21 and was inactive for finale against the Minnesota Vikings the following week.

Shelton played in 12 games during his final season with the Cardinals in 2004, starting nine of them at right tackle. He was inactive for season opener at the St. Louis Rams, and was placed on Injured Reserve with a knee injury on December 14 which caused him to miss the final three contests.

During the following offseason, Shelton was the subject of various trade rumors. He was linked to the Chicago Bears, and to a trade with the Buffalo Bills that would have sent running back Travis Henry to Arizona. The Cardinals drafted Virginia offensive guard Elton Brown in the fourth round of the 2005 NFL draft which further cemented the end of Shelton's tenure with the team. He was finally released on May 18, 2005.

=== Cleveland Browns ===
As a free agent in 2005, Shelton received interest from teams like the Chicago Bears, Houston Texans, Kansas City Chiefs and Jacksonville Jaguars. The Cleveland Browns joined the race, and after it appeared to come down to the Browns and Texans, Shelton chose to sign a one-year deal with the Browns on June 3.

Shelton arrived at Browns camp slightly out of shape, but went on to impress head coach Romeo Crennel and won the left tackle job. He started all 16 games at left tackle in his lone season for the Browns and was part of a line that led the way for running back Reuben Droughns, who amassed 1,232 yards rushing as he became Cleveland's first 1,000-yard rusher since 1985.

=== Miami Dolphins ===
The Browns were interested in re-signing Shelton, who was an unrestricted free agent in 2006. They worked on a new contract with Shelton and his agent before and after free agency began, but the Miami Dolphins signed him to a four-year deal on March 15. The contract was worth a total of $15 million and included a $3.5 million signing bonus. It had base salaries of $2.0 million (2006), $2.0 million (2007), $3.0 million (2008), and $3.75 million (2009).

Shelton struggled heavily during the first five games of the season at left tackle, and coupled with quarterback Daunte Culpepper - who as not entirely healthy while recovering from knee surgery - the Dolphins' offense struggled as a whole. Shelton found a new home at right guard, where the Dolphins had several injuries prior to Shelton's arrival at the position. While the line was never exceptional in 2006, the combination that included Shelton at right guard and Damion McIntosh at left tackle did help the progression of the team's offense as the season went on. Shelton would start the final 11 games of the season at right guard after starting the first five at left tackle.

Due to his contract, Shelton was all but guaranteed a chance to earn a starting job in 2007. There was the possibility he could be shifted back to left tackle, depending on what the team did in the draft and free agency, and whether the organization could re-sign offensive tackle Damion McIntosh. Because of Vernon Carey's move to left tackle, coach Cam Cameron stated that Shelton would be the starting right tackle.

On February 11, 2008, Shelton was one of nine players released by the Dolphins.

=== San Diego Chargers ===
On April 29, 2008, the San Diego Chargers signed Shelton to a two-year contract. He was released after one season with the team.

== Personal ==
Shelton is the son of former National Basketball Association player Lonnie Shelton. Shelton's younger brothers include Marlon, who played basketball at the University of Washington from 1998 to 2003, Titus, who played basketball from 2005 to 2009 for California Polytechnic State University, and Tim who played basketball for San Diego State University from 2007 to 2012 and is currently an assistant coach for Colorado State University. Shelton has a child, Ajani.

Shelton majored in telecommunications and film at Eastern Michigan.
