= Quentin Harris (American football) =

American football player and executive (born 1977)

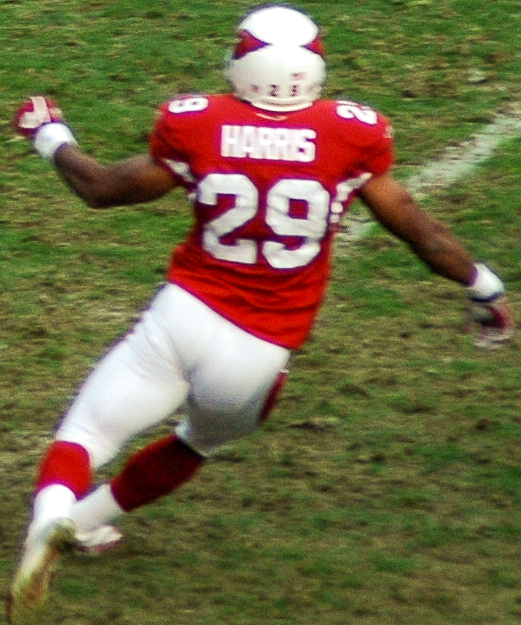
- Harris with the Arizona Cardinals in 2005

Pittsburgh Steelers
- Title: Senior personnel assistant

Personal information
- Born: January 26, 1977 (age 49); Wilkes-Barre, Pennsylvania, U.S.
- Listed height: 6 ft 1 in (1.85 m)
- Listed weight: 213 lb (97 kg)

Career information
- College: Syracuse
- NFL draft: 2002: undrafted

Career history

Playing
- Arizona Cardinals (2002–2005); New York Giants (2006)*; Denver Broncos (2006–2007)
- * Offseason or practice squad member only

Operations
- Arizona Cardinals (2008–2013) Scout; Arizona Cardinals (2013–2018) Director of pro scouting; Arizona Cardinals (2019–2020) Director of player personnel; Arizona Cardinals (2021–2024) Vice president of player personnel; Pittsburgh Steelers (2024-present) Senior personnel assistant
- Stats at Pro Football Reference

Quentin Hugh Harris (born January 26, 1977) is an American football executive and former safety who is a senior personnel assistant for the Pittsburgh Steelers of the National Football League (NFL).

Harris played college football for the Syracuse Orange and was signed by the Arizona Cardinals as an undrafted free agent in 2002. In his six seasons in the NFL, Harris played for the Cardinals, New York Giants and Denver Broncos. Following the end of his playing career, Harris joined the Cardinals as a scout and spent 16 years in their personnel department.

== Playing career ==
Pre-draft measurables
Height	Weight	40-yard dash	10-yard split	20-yard split	20-yard shuttle	Three-cone drill	Vertical jump	Broad jump	Bench press
6 ft 0 1/8 in (1.83 m)	216 lb (98 kg)	4.61 s	1.58 s	2.64 s	4.34 s	7.59 s	36.5 in (0.93 m)	10 ft 0 in (3.05 m)	14 reps
All values from NFL Combine

=== Arizona Cardinals ===
Harris was signed by the Arizona Cardinals on April 22, 2002.

=== New York Giants ===
He signed with the New York Giants in March 2006. He was released by the Giants on September 2, 2006.

=== Denver Broncos ===
He was signed by the Denver Broncos on November 21, 2006. He was released by the Broncos on August 28, 2007.

== Executive career ==
=== Arizona Cardinals ===
On June 18, 2008, Harris was hired by the Arizona Cardinals as a scout. In May 2013, Harris was promoted to director of pro scouting. In 2019, Harris was promoted to director of player personnel.

On February 16, 2021, Harris was promoted to vice president of player personnel. He served in this role for three seasons. On February 21, 2024, it was announced that the team had parted ways with Harris upon the hiring of new general manager Monti Ossenfort.

=== Pittsburgh Steelers ===
In 2024, Harris was hired as a senior personnel assistant for the Pittsburgh Steelers. He participated in the NFL’s Front Office & GM Accelerator Program in December 2024.

== Personal life ==
Harris and his wife, Tara, have three children: Aliyah, Amani, and Elijah.
