= Nijrell Eason =

American football player (born 1979)

No. 27
- Positions: Cornerback, Safety

Personal information
- Born: May 20, 1979; Long Beach, California, U.S.
- Listed height: 6 ft 1 in (1.85 m)
- Listed weight: 205 lb (93 kg)

Career information
- High school: Woodrow Wilson Classical (Long Beach)
- College: Arizona State
- NFL draft: 2001: undrafted

Career history
- Arizona Cardinals (2001)*; Frankfurt Galaxy (2002); Pittsburgh Steelers (2002)*; Arizona Cardinals (2002-2003)
- * Offseason or practice squad member only

Career NFL statistics
- Games played: 1
- Stats at Pro Football Reference

Nijrell Keon Eason (born May 20, 1979) is an American former professional football player who was a cornerback for one season with the Arizona Cardinals in 2002. He also played for the Frankfurt Galaxy. He played college football for the Arizona State Sun Devils.

== Early life ==
Eason was born on May 20, 1979, in Long Beach, California, where he attended Woodrow Wilson Classical High School.

== College career ==
Eason went to college at Arizona State University. In 1999 he played 12 games and had one interception. In 2000 he had 5 interceptions and was tied for 1st in Pac 12 for interceptions. He was also a finalist for the Jim Thorpe Award.

== Professional career ==
Pre-draft measurables
Height	Weight	Hand span	40-yard dash	20-yard split	20-yard shuttle	Three-cone drill	Vertical jump	Broad jump	Bench press
6 ft 0 in (1.83 m)	201 lb (91 kg)	9 1/2 in (0.24 m)	4.59 s	2.84 s	4.28 s	7.00 s	34 1/2 in (0.88 m)	9 ft 11 in (3.02 m)	19 reps
All values from NFL Scouting Combine

Eason went undrafted in 2001. He was signed by the Cardinals but released during roster cuts. He was signed by the Pittsburgh Steelers in 2002 but was also released in roster cuts. He later played for the Frankfurt Galaxy in 2002. Later in the season, he was signed again by the Cardinals, and played in one game.
