= Mike Banks (American football) =

American football player (born 1979)

No. 80, 84
- Position: Tight end

Personal information
- Born: November 5, 1979 (age 47); Mason City, Iowa, U.S.
- Listed height: 6 ft 4 in (1.93 m)
- Listed weight: 262 lb (119 kg)

Career information
- High school: Ogden (IA)
- College: Iowa State
- NFL draft: 2002: 7th round, 223rd overall pick

Career history
- Arizona Cardinals (2002–2003); New Orleans Saints (2005)*
- * Offseason or practice squad member only
- Stats at Pro Football Reference

Michael A. Banks (born November 5, 1979) is an American former professional football tight end for the Arizona Cardinals of the National Football League (NFL). He was selected in the seventh round of the 2002 NFL draft with the 223rd overall pick.
