= Raleigh Roundtree =

American football player (born 1975)

No. 73, 74, 58
- Position: Guard

Personal information
- Born: August 31, 1975 (age 51); Augusta, Georgia, U.S.
- Listed height: 6 ft 4 in (1.93 m)
- Listed weight: 295 lb (134 kg)

Career information
- High school: T. W. Josey (Augusta)
- College: South Carolina State
- NFL draft: 1997: 4th round, 109th overall pick

Career history
- San Diego Chargers (1997–2001); Jacksonville Jaguars (2002)*; Arizona Cardinals (2002–2003); Edmonton Eskimos (2006–2007)
- * Offseason or practice squad member only

Awards and highlights
- 3x First-team All-MEAC (1994-1996); Div. I-AA All-American (1996)

Career NFL statistics
- Games Played: 72
- Games Started: 47
- Fumble recoveries: 3
- Stats at Pro Football Reference

Raleigh Cito Roundtree (born August 31, 1975) is an American former professional football player who was an offensive guard in the National Football League for seven seasons in the National Football League (NFL) from 1997 to 2003. He played college football for the South Carolina State Bulldogs and was selected 109th overall in the fourth round of the 1997 NFL draft. He played his first five seasons in the NFL for the San Diego Chargers and his final two for the Arizona Cardinals.

He played a total of 72 career games, including 47 career starts. He was the starting right guard in San Diego in 2000 and 2001.
