= Justin Lucas =

American football player (born 1976)

No. 41
- Position: Cornerback

Personal information
- Born: July 15, 1976 (age 50); Victoria, Texas, U.S.
- Listed height: 5 ft 10 in (1.78 m)
- Listed weight: 211 lb (96 kg)

Career information
- High school: Stroman (Victoria, Texas)
- College: Texas A&M (1994–1996); Abilene Christian (1997–1998)
- NFL draft: 1999: undrafted

Career history
- Arizona Cardinals (1999–2003); St. Louis Rams (2004)

Career NFL statistics
- Games played: 65
- Tackles: 108
- Interceptions: 2
- Fumble recoveries: 3
- Stats at Pro Football Reference

Justin Ashley Lucas (born July 15, 1976) is an American former professional football player who played cornerback for six seasons for the Arizona Cardinals from 1999 to 2003 and St. Louis Rams in 2004. He appeared in 65 NFL games, eight as a starter. He also played college football for Abilene Christian in 1997 and 1998.
