= Tim Duncan (American football) =

American football player (born 1979)

No. 5
- Position: Placekicker

Personal information
- Born: June 12, 1979 (age 47); Tulsa, Oklahoma, U.S.

Career information
- College: Oklahoma
- NFL draft: 2002: undrafted

Career history
- Arizona Cardinals (2002–2003); Philadelphia Eagles (2004)*; Oakland Raiders (2006)*
- * Offseason or practice squad member only

Awards and highlights
- BCS national champion (2000)

Career NFL statistics
- Field goals attempted: 10
- Field goals made: 6
- Field goal long: 53
- Stats at Pro Football Reference

Tim Duncan (born June 12, 1979) is an American former professional football player who was a placekicker for the Arizona Cardinals of the National Football League (NFL). He played college football for the Oklahoma Sooners.

== College career ==
Duncan played for Kentucky State University in the Division II SIAC conference during the 1997 season when he helped the Thoroughbreds win the inaugural Pioneer Bowl. He transferred to the University of Oklahoma the following season.

Duncan was the starting placekicker for Oklahoma's 2000 BCS National Championship team.

== NFL career ==
Duncan played two seasons for the Arizona Cardinals backing up starter Bill Gramatica. Due to Gramatica's inconsistency and injury problems, this made it a necessity for the team to keep two kickers.

He appeared in five games in 2003, making 6 out of 10 field goals and 5 out of 6 extra points, with his longest field goal being a 53-yarder. He was released on November 10, 2003.

On March 30, 2004, Duncan signed a two-year contract with the Philadelphia Eagles, only to be released August 30. He would later work out with the Tennessee Titans, but wasn't offered a contract.

After a year out of football, Duncan signed with the Oakland Raiders on January 24, 2006. He was soon relocated to NFL Europa, where he played for the Cologne Centurions. The Raiders released him August 29.
