= Jason McAddley =

American football player (born 1979)

No. 83, 80, 81, 15
- Position: Wide receiver

Personal information
- Born: July 28, 1979 (age 47); Brooklyn, New York, U.S.
- Listed height: 6 ft 2 in (1.88 m)
- Listed weight: 200 lb (91 kg)

Career information
- High school: Oak Ridge (TN)
- College: Alabama
- NFL draft: 2002: 5th round, 149th overall pick

Career history
- Arizona Cardinals (2002–2003); Tennessee Titans (2004); San Francisco 49ers (2005); Washington Redskins (2007)*
- * Offseason or practice squad member only

Career NFL statistics
- Receptions: 38
- Receiving yards: 578
- Receiving touchdowns: 1
- Stats at Pro Football Reference

Jason Christopher McAddley (born July 28, 1979) is an American former professional football player who was a wide receiver in the National Football League (NFL). He played his high school football at Oak Ridge High School in Oak Ridge, Tennessee, and played college football for the Alabama Crimson Tide.

He was selected by the Arizona Cardinals in the fifth round (149th overall) in the 2002 NFL draft. He played for the Cardinals for two years. He was signed as a free agent by the Tennessee Titans in 2004. He then signed with 49ers in 2005. He was signed by the Redskins before the 2007 season.
