= Steven Grace =

American football player (born 1979)

No. 64
- Position: Center

Personal information
- Born: February 13, 1979 (age 47); Honolulu, Hawaii, U.S.
- Listed height: 6 ft 3 in (1.91 m)
- Listed weight: 296 lb (134 kg)

Career information
- High school: Kamehameha (Honolulu)
- College: Arizona (1997–2001)
- NFL draft: 2002: undrafted

Career history
- Arizona Cardinals (2002–2004); → Rhein Fire (2004)

Awards and highlights
- Second-team All-Pac-10 (1999)

Career NFL statistics
- Games played: 1
- Stats at Pro Football Reference

Steven Kanoeau Grace (born February 13, 1979) is an American former professional football center who played in the National Football League (NFL) for the Arizona Cardinals. He played college football for the Arizona Wildcats. Grace also played for the Rhein Fire in NFL Europe.

== Early life ==
Grace was born on February 13, 1979, in Honolulu, Hawaii. He attended Kamehameha Schools in Honolulu.

== College career ==
Grace played college football for the Arizona Wildcats from 1997 to 2001. He redshirted his first year and was a four-year letterman from 1998 to 2001. Grace was named to the second-team All-Pac-10 team in 1999.

== Professional career ==
=== Arizona Cardinals ===
After going undrafted in the 2002 NFL draft, Grace signed with the Arizona Cardinals as an undrafted free agent. He made the initial roster but was waived on September 9, 2002. On September 11, Grace was signed to the practice squad. On December 4, he was re-signed to the active roster. Grace was the primary backup at guard and played in the final game of the season against the Denver Broncos.

On March 5, 2003, Grace re-signed with the Cardinals. On September 1, he was released. On November 5, Grace was signed to the practice squad. On December 30, he signed a one-year contract with the team. On September 5, 2004, Grace was released by the team.

=== Rhein Fire ===
In 2004, Grace was allocated to the Rhein Fire of NFL Europe. He played and started in ten games, recording one tackle on special teams.
