= 2001 Arizona Cardinals season =

NFL team season

- Owner: Bill Bidwill
- Head coach: Dave McGinnis
- Home stadium: Sun Devil Stadium

Results
- Record: 7–9
- Division place: 4th NFC East
- Playoffs: Did not qualify
- Pro Bowlers: WR David Boston

The 2001 Arizona Cardinals season was the franchise's 82nd year with the National Football League (NFL) and the 14th season in Arizona. It was their final season in the NFC East division before moving to their current division, the NFC West.

Due to being the only team in the league with a Week 1 bye, the Cardinals were the final team to play their season opener, which was pushed back even further in wake of the September 11 attacks. Arizona did not play its opener until September 23 versus the Denver Broncos, the latest date an NFL team played its season opener since the 1960 Detroit Lions did not begin until October 2.

The 2001 Cardinals were also the most recent team in NFL history to have a Week 1 bye until the Tampa Bay Buccaneers and Miami Dolphins in 2017 due to Hurricane Irma. However, the 2001 Cardinals are the most recent NFL team to have a scheduled week 1 bye, a situation which will not occur again unless the NFL has an odd number of teams.

The 2001 season was Pat Tillman’s final season as he left the NFL to join the U.S. Army following the season.

== Offseason ==
=== NFL draft ===
2001 Arizona Cardinals draft
Round	Pick	Player	Position	College	Notes
1	2	Leonard Davis *	Offensive tackle	Texas	
2	34	Kyle Vanden Bosch *	Defensive end	Nebraska	
2	54	Michael Stone	Defensive back	Memphis	
3	64	Adrian Wilson *	Defensive back	NC State	
4	98	Bill Gramática	Placekicker	South Florida	
4	123	Marcus Bell	Defensive tackle	Memphis	
5	133	Mario Fatafehi	Defensive tackle	Kansas State	
6	166	Bobby Newcombe	Wide receiver	Nebraska	
7	202	Renaldo Hill	Defensive back	Michigan State	
7	246	Tevita Ofahengaue	Tight end	BYU	
Made roster * Made at least one Pro Bowl during career

=== Undrafted free agents ===
2001 undrafted free agents of note
Player	Position	College
Andy Bowers	Defensive end	Utah
Michael Cook	Tackle	Boston College
Corey Crume	Running back	Eastern Kentucky
Arnold Jackson	Wide receiver	Louisville
Jason Padget	Center	Louisville
Nate Poole	Wide receiver	Marshall
Marcel Shipp	Running back	Massachusetts
Fred Wakefield	Defensive end	Illinois
LeVar Woods	Linebacker	Iowa

== Personnel ==
=== Staff ===
2001 Arizona Cardinals staff
Front office: President – Bill Bidwill; Vice president – Larry Wilson; Vice president and general counsel – Michael Bidwill; General manager – Bob Ferguson; Assistant to the president – Rod Graves; Head coaches: Head coach – Dave McGinnis; Offensive coaches: Offensive coordinator – Rich Olson; Quarterbacks – Geep Chryst; Running backs – Johnny Roland; Wide receivers – Jerry Sullivan; Tight ends – Pete Hoener; Offensive line – George Warhop; Assistant Off. Line/Off. Quality Control – Mike Devlin	Defensive coaches: Defensive coordinator – Larry Marmie; Defensive line – Joe Greene; Linebackers – Jeff FitzGerald; Defensive backs – Kevin Ramsey; Special teams coaches: Special teams – Hank Kuhlmann; Special Teams Assistant/Def. Quality Control – Stan Kwan; Strength and conditioning: Strength and conditioning – Bob Rogucki

=== Roster ===
2001 Arizona Cardinals roster
Quarterbacks (QB): 17 Dave Brown; 14 Chris Greisen; 16 Jake Plummer; Running backs (RB): 26 Thomas Jones; 34 Joel Makovicka FB; 39 Dennis McKinley FB; 32 Michael Pittman KR; 31 Marcel Shipp KR; Wide receivers (WR): 89 David Boston; 11 Bryan Gilmore; 84 Arnold Jackson PR; 82 MarTay Jenkins KR; 81 Frank Sanders; Tight ends (TE): 87 Steve Bush; 48 Nathan Hodel; 83 Tywan Mitchell	Offensive linemen (OL): 61 Jarvis Borum T; 65 Anthony Clement T; 62 Michael Cook T; 75 Leonard Davis G; 67 Chris Dishman G; 60 Mike Gruttadauria C; 68 Yusuf Scott G; 70 L. J. Shelton T; 50 Jason Starkey C; Defensive linemen (DL): 94 Marcus Bell DT; 71 Andy Bowers DE; 95 Tom Burke DE; 98 Russell Davis DT; 72 Jabari Issa DE/DT; 92 Barron Tanner DT; 78 Mao Tosi DE/DT; 97 Fred Wakefield DE	Linebackers (LB): 59 Rob Fredrickson OLB; 57 Ronald McKinnon MLB; 51 Johnny Rutledge MLB; 54 Sekou Sanyika OLB; 55 Raynoch Thompson OLB; 52 Zack Walz OLB; 56 LeVar Woods OLB; 53 Michael Young MLB; Defensive backs (DB): 36 David Barrett CB; 25 Corey Chavous CB; 45 Renaldo Hill CB; 42 Kwamie Lassiter FS; 41 Justin Lucas SS; 23 Coby Rhinehart CB; 44 Michael Stone FS; 40 Pat Tillman SS; 22 Adrian Wilson SS; Special teams (ST): 86 Trey Junkin LS; 1 Cedric Oglesby K; 10 Scott Player P	Practice squad: 4 Nate Poole WR; 90 Jarrett Procell DE; Reserve: 15 Cary Blanchard K (IR); 79 Mario Fatafehi DE/DT (IR); 58 James Folston LB (IR); 7 Bill Gramatica K (IR); 80 Terry Hardy TE (IR); 49 Lawrence Hart TE (IR); 66 Pete Kendall G (IR); 24 Tom Knight CB (IR); 85 Rob Moore WR (IR); 93 Kyle Vanden Bosch DE (IR); Rookies in italics 53 active, 10 reserve, 2 practice squad

== Preseason ==
Week	Date	Opponent	Result	Record	Venue
1	August 11	Oakland Raiders	L 7–10	0–1	Sun Devil Stadium
2	August 18	at Seattle Seahawks	W 16–13 (OT)	1–1	Husky Stadium
3	August 25	at Chicago Bears	W 24–20	2–1	Soldier Field
4	August 31	San Diego Chargers	W 16–3	3–1	Sun Devil Stadium

== Regular season ==
=== Schedule ===
Week	Date	Opponent	Result	Record	Venue	Attendance
1	Bye					
2 (Note: The Cardinals were originally scheduled to play the Washington Redskins during Week 2 of the original NFL schedule (September 16) at FedExField in Landover. However, due to the September 11 attacks, the game was rescheduled to Week 17.)	September 23	Denver Broncos	**L** 17–38	0–1	Sun Devil Stadium	50,913
3	September 30	Atlanta Falcons	**L** 14–34	0–2	Sun Devil Stadium	28,878
4	October 7	at **Philadelphia Eagles**	**W** 21–20	1–2	Veterans Stadium	66,360
5	October 14	at Chicago Bears	**L** 13–20	1–3	Soldier Field	66,944
6	October 21	Kansas City Chiefs	**W** 24–16	2–3	Sun Devil Stadium	35,916
7	October 28	at **Dallas Cowboys**	**L** 3–17	2–4	Texas Stadium	63,114
8	November 4	**Philadelphia Eagles**	**L** 7–21	2–5	Sun Devil Stadium	33,430
9	November 11	**New York Giants**	**L** 10–17	2–6	Sun Devil Stadium	36,917
10	November 18	Detroit Lions	**W** 45–38	3–6	Sun Devil Stadium	32,322
11	November 25	at San Diego Chargers	**W** 20–17	4–6	Qualcomm Stadium	49,398
12	December 2	at Oakland Raiders	**W** 34–31	5–6	Network Associates Coliseum	46,601
13	December 9	**Washington Redskins**	**L** 10–20	5–7	Sun Devil Stadium	40,056
14	December 15	at **New York Giants**	**L** 13–17	5–8	Giants Stadium	77,913
15	December 23	**Dallas Cowboys**	**W** 17–10	6–8	Sun Devil Stadium	48,883
16	December 30	at Carolina Panthers	**W** 30–7	7–8	Ericsson Stadium	72,025
17	January 6	at **Washington Redskins**	**L** 17–20	7–9	FedExField	61,721

Note: Intra-division opponents are in bold text.

=== Game summaries ===
==== Week 2: vs. Denver Broncos ====
Week 2: Denver Broncos at Arizona Cardinals – Game summary

Quarter	1	2	3	4	Total
**Broncos**	0	17	14	7	**38**
Cardinals	3	7	0	7	**17**

at Sun Devil Stadium, Tempe, Arizona

- Date: September 23
- Game time: 6:35 p.m. MST
- Game weather: 103 °F (39 °C)
- Game attendance: 50,913
- Referee: Ron Blum
- TV announcers (ESPN): Mike Patrick, Paul Maguire, Joe Theismann, and Suzy Kolber
- Box Score

Game information

**First quarter**

- ARI – Bill Gramática 28-yard field goal, 7:43. Cardinals 3–0.

**Second quarter**

- ARI – Thomas Jones 1-yard run (Bill Gramática kick), 14:57. Cardinals 10–0.
- DEN – Jason Elam 49-yard field goal, 11:24. Cardinals 10–3.
- DEN – Jason Elam 31-yard field goal, 5:04. Cardinals 10–6.
- DEN – Jason Elam 35-yard field goal, 3:23. Cardinals 10–9.
- DEN – Rod Smith 10-yard pass from Brian Griese (Brian Griese–Dwayne Carswell pass), 0:32. Broncos 17–10.

**Third quarter**

- DEN – Rod Smith 34-yard pass from Brian Griese (Jason Elam kick), 11:51. Broncos 24–10.
- DEN – Patrick Hape 1-yard pass from Brian Griese (Jason Elam kick), 5:53. Broncos 31–10.

**Fourth quarter**

- DEN – Olandis Gary 9-yard run (Jason Elam kick), 13:38. Broncos 38–10.
- ARI – Terry Hardy 6-yard pass from Jake Plummer (Bill Gramática kick), 4:54. Broncos 38–17.

**Top passers**

- DEN – Brian Griese – 22/31, 242 yards, 3 TD
- ARI – Jake Plummer – 16/28, 242 yards, TD, INT

**Top rushers**

- DEN – Olandis Gary – 14 rushes, 90 yards, TD
- ARI – Thomas Jones – 17 rushes, 65 yards, TD

**Top receivers**

- DEN – Rod Smith – 14 receptions, 162 yards, 2 TD
- ARI – David Boston – 8 receptions, 145 yards

==== Week 3: vs. Atlanta Falcons ====
Week 3: Atlanta Falcons at Arizona Cardinals – Game summary

Quarter	1	2	3	4	Total
**Falcons**	10	3	7	14	**34**
Cardinals	0	0	7	7	**14**

at Sun Devil Stadium, Tempe, Arizona

- Date: September 30
- Game time: 2:05 p.m. MST
- Game weather: 104 °F (40 °C)
- Game attendance: 28,878
- Referee: Gerry Austin
- TV announcers (FOX): Curt Menefee, Brian Baldinger, D.J. Johnson
- Box Score

Game information

**First quarter**

- ATL – Terance Mathis 17-yard pass from Chris Chandler (Jay Feely kick), 6:10. Falcons 7–0.
- ATL – Jay Feely 34-yard field goal, 2:33. Falcons 10–0.

**Second quarter**

- ATL – Jay Feely 55-yard field goal, 0:04. Falcons 13–0.

**Third quarter**

- ARI – Michael Pittman 24-yard run (Bill Gramática kick), 14:57. Falcons 13–7.
- ATL – Terance Mathis 10-yard pass from Chris Chandler (Jay Feely kick), 4:51. Falcons 20–7.

**Fourth quarter**

- ATL – Maurice Smith 1-yard run (Jay Feely kick), 14:15. Falcons 27–7.
- ATL – Maurice Smith 79-yard pass from Chris Chandler (Jay Feely kick), 11:27. Falcons 34–7.
- ARI – Terry Hardy 12-yard pass from Jake Plummer (Bill Gramática kick), 7:59. Falcons 34–14.

**Top passers**

- ATL – Chris Chandler – 20/28, 286 yards, 3 TD
- ARI – Jake Plummer – 23/35, 276 yards, TD, 3 INT

**Top rushers**

- ATL – Maurice Smith – 21 rushes, 70 yards, TD
- ARI – Michael Pittman – 7 rushes, 53 yards, TD

**Top receivers**

- ATL – Maurice Smith – 2 receptions, 108 yards, TD
- ARI – Frank Sanders – 4 receptions, 96 yards

==== Week 4: at Philadelphia Eagles ====
Week 4: Arizona Cardinals at Philadelphia Eagles – Game summary

Quarter	1	2	3	4	Total
**Cardinals**	14	0	0	7	**21**
Eagles	7	10	0	3	**20**

at Veterans Stadium, Philadelphia, Pennsylvania

- Date: October 7
- Game time: 1:10 p.m. EST/11:10 a.m. MST
- Game weather: 53 °F (12 °C)
- Game attendance: 66,360
- Referee: Bernie Kukar
- TV announcers (FOX): Curt Menefee, Brian Baldinger
- Box Score

Game information

**First quarter**

- ARI – Kyle Vanden Bosch 9-yard fumble return (Bill Gramática kick), 14:06. Cardinals 7–0.
- ARI – Joel Makovicka 2-yard pass from Jake Plummer (Bill Gramática kick), 3:42. Cardinals 14–0.
- PHI – Todd Pinkston 13-yard pass from Donovan McNabb (David Akers kick), 0:07. Cardinals 14–7.

**Second quarter**

- PHI – David Akers 42-yard field goal, 8:39. Cardinals 14–10.
- PHI – Todd Pinkston 2-yard pass from Donovan McNabb (David Akers kick), 0:05. Eagles 17–14.

**Third quarter**

- No scoring plays

**Fourth quarter**

- PHI – David Akers 28-yard field goal, 1:13. Eagles 20–14.
- ARI – MarTay Jenkins 35-yard pass from Jake Plummer (Bill Gramática kick), 0:09. Cardinals 21–20.

**Top passers**

- ARI – Jake Plummer – 18/32, 238 yards, 2 TD, INT
- PHI – Donovan McNabb – 19/29, 280 yards, 2 TD, INT

**Top rushers**

- ARI – Michael Pittman – 22 rushes, 83 yards
- PHI – Correll Buckhalter – 21 rushes, 134 yards

**Top receivers**

- ARI – MarTay Jenkins – 6 receptions, 119 yards, TD
- PHI – Todd Pinkston – 4 receptions, 90 yards, TD

==== Week 5: at Chicago Bears ====
Week 5: Arizona Cardinals at Chicago Bears – Game summary

Quarter	1	2	3	4	Total
Cardinals	14	0	0	7	**21**
**Bears**	7	10	0	3	**20**

at Soldier Field, Chicago, Illinois

- Date: October 14
- Game time: 12:05 p.m. CST/11:05 a.m. MST
- Game weather: 54 °F (12 °C)
- Game attendance: 66,944
- Referee: Johnny Grier
- TV announcers (FOX): Curt Menefee, Brian Baldinger
- Box Score

Game information

**First quarter**

- CHI – Paul Edinger 46-yard field goal, 2:42. Bears 3–0.

**Second quarter**

- ARI – Bill Gramática 40-yard field goal, 13:23. Tied 3–3.
- CHI – James Allen 1-yard run (Paul Edinger kick), 7:49. Bears 10–3.
- ARI – Bill Gramática 47-yard field goal, 3:18. Bears 10–6.
- CHI – Paul Edinger 43-yard field goal, 0:00. Bears 13–6.

**Third quarter**

- CHI – R.W. McQuarters 69-yard fumble return (Paul Edinger kick), 7:33. Bears 20–6.

**Fourth quarter**

- ARI – Frank Sanders 7-yard pass from Jake Plummer (Bill Gramática kick), 2:52. Bears 20–13.

**Top passers**

- ARI – Jake Plummer – 20/37, 216 yards, TD
- CHI – Jim Miller – 15/21, 116 yards, 2 INT

**Top rushers**

- ARI – Michael Pittman – 16 rushes, 50 yards
- CHI – James Allen – 18 rushes, 75 yards, TD

**Top receivers**

- ARI – David Boston – 6 receptions, 85 yards
- CHI – Marty Booker – 5 receptions, 48 yards

==== Week 6: vs. Kansas City Chiefs ====
Week 6: Kansas City Chiefs at Arizona Cardinals – Game summary

Quarter	1	2	3	4	Total
Chiefs	3	6	0	7	**16**
**Cardinals**	0	3	7	14	**24**

at Sun Devil Stadium, Tempe, Arizona

- Date: October 21
- Game time: 2:05 p.m. MST
- Game weather: 90 °F (32 °C)
- Game attendance: 35,916
- Referee: Tony Corrente
- TV announcers (CBS): Don Criqui, Steve Tasker
- Box Score

Game information

**First quarter**

- KC – Todd Peterson 49-yard field goal, 0:39. Chiefs 3–0.

**Second quarter**

- ARI – Bill Gramática 29-yard field goal, 13:08. Tied 3–3.
- KC – Todd Peterson 29-yard field goal, 6:19. Chiefs 6–3.
- KC – Todd Peterson 33-yard field goal, 0:00. Chiefs 9–3.

**Third quarter**

- ARI – Michael Pittman 24-yard run (Bill Gramática kick), 9:17. Cardinals 10–9.

**Fourth quarter**

- ARI – David Boston 23-yard pass from Jake Plummer (Bill Gramática kick), 14:16. Cardinals 17–9.
- ARI – Thomas Jones 13-yard run (Bill Gramática kick), 9:43. Cardinals 24–9.
- KC – Derrick Alexander 34-yard pass from Trent Green (Todd Peterson kick), 3:57. Cardinals 24–16.

**Top passers**

- KC – Trent Green – 21/44, 352 yards, TD, 2 INT
- ARI – Jake Plummer – 16/25, 228 yards, TD

**Top rushers**

- KC – Priest Holmes – 15 rushes, 85 yards
- ARI – Michael Pittman – 26 rushes, 95 yards, TD

**Top receivers**

- KC – Derrick Alexander – 4 receptions, 99 yards, TD
- ARI – David Boston – 7 receptions, 131 yards, TD

==== Week 7: at Dallas Cowboys ====
Week 7: Arizona Cardinals at Dallas Cowboys – Game summary

Quarter	1	2	3	4	Total
Cardinals	3	0	0	0	**3**
**Cowboys**	0	3	14	0	**17**

at Texas Stadium, Irving, Texas

- Date: October 28
- Game time: 2:05 p.m. CST/1:05 p.m. MST
- Game weather: 70 °F (21 °C)
- Game attendance: 63,114
- Referee: Ron Blum
- TV announcers (FOX): Ray Bentley, Jeff Lageman, D.J. Johnson
- Box Score

Game information

**First quarter**

- ARI – Bill Gramática 27-yard field goal, 3:06. Cardinals 3–0.

**Second quarter**

- DAL – Tim Seder 31-yard field goal, 1:09. Tied 3–3.

**Third quarter**

- DAL – Clint Stoerner 6-yard run (Tim Seder kick), 11:32. Cowboys 10–3.
- DAL – Dexter Coakley 10-yard interception return (Tim Seder kick), 1:55. Cowboys 17–3.

**Fourth quarter**

- No scoring plays

**Top passers**

- ARI – Jake Plummer – 25/41, 233 yards, 2 INT
- DAL – Clint Stoerner – 9/19, 93 yards, INT

**Top rushers**

- ARI – Jake Plummer – 4 rushes, 35 yards
- DAL – Emmitt Smith – 21 rushes, 83 yards

**Top receivers**

- ARI – David Boston – 9 receptions, 108 yards
- DAL – Rocket Ismail – 3 receptions, 39 yards

==== Week 8: vs. Philadelphia Eagles ====
Week 8: Philadelphia Eagles at Arizona Cardinals – Game summary

Quarter	1	2	3	4	Total
**Eagles**	7	14	0	0	**21**
Cardinals	0	7	0	0	**7**

at Sun Devil Stadium, Tempe, Arizona

- Date: November 4
- Game time: 2:05 p.m. MST
- Game weather: 94 °F (34 °C)
- Game attendance: 33,430
- Referee: Bill Leavy
- TV announcers (FOX): Curt Menefee, Brian Baldinger, and D.J. Johnson
- Box Score

Game information

**First quarter**

- PHI – Brian Mitchell 94-yard kickoff return (David Akers kick), 14:43. Eagles 7–0.

**Second quarter**

- PHI – James Thrash 8-yard pass from Donovan McNabb (David Akers kick), 2:44. Eagles 14–0.
- ARI – Tywan Mitchell 2-yard pass from Jake Plummer (Bill Gramática kick), 1:05. Eagles 14–7.
- PHI – James Thrash 54-yard pass from Donovan McNabb (David Akers kick), 0:33. Eagles 21–7.

**Third quarter**

- No scoring plays

**Fourth quarter**

- No scoring plays

**Top passers**

- PHI – Donovan McNabb – 19/33, 238 yards, 2 TD, INT
- ARI – Jake Plummer – 24/41, 293 yards, TD, INT

**Top rushers**

- PHI – Duce Staley – 12 rushes, 49 yards
- ARI – Michael Pittman – 18 rushes, 43 yards

**Top receivers**

- PHI – James Thrash – 4 receptions, 80 yards, 2 TD
- ARI – David Boston – 8 receptions, 138 yards

==== Week 9: vs. New York Giants ====
Week 9: New York Giants at Arizona Cardinals – Game summary

Quarter	1	2	3	4	Total
**Giants**	7	7	0	3	**17**
Cardinals	0	3	7	0	**10**

at Sun Devil Stadium, Tempe, Arizona

- Date: November 11
- Game time: 2:15 p.m. MST
- Game weather: 83 °F (28 °C)
- Game attendance: 36,917
- Referee: Mike Carey
- TV announcers (FOX): Kenny Albert, Tim Green, and D.J. Johnson
- Box Score

Game information

**First quarter**

- NYG – Ron Dayne 3-yard run (Morten Andersen kick), 9:31. Giants 7–0.

**Second quarter**

- NYG – Ike Hilliard 27-yard pass from Kerry Collins (Morten Andersen kick), 7:40. Giants 14–0.
- ARI – David Boston 38-yard pass from Jake Plummer (Bill Gramática kick), 4:38. Giants 14–7.

**Third quarter**

- ARI – Bill Gramática 32-yard field goal, 8:05. Giants 14–10.

**Fourth quarter**

- NYG – Morten Andersen 25-yard field goal, 11:39. Giants 17–10.

**Top passers**

- NYG – Kerry Collins – 15/24, 155 yards, TD, INT
- ARI – Jake Plummer – 13/26, 172 yards, TD, INT

**Top rushers**

- NYG – Tiki Barber – 17 rushes, 118 yards
- ARI – Michael Pittman – 17 rushes, 54 yards

**Top receivers**

- NYG – Ike Hilliard – 3 receptions, 43 yards, TD
- ARI – David Boston – 9 receptions, 137 yards, TD

==== Week 10: vs. Detroit Lions ====
Week 10: Detroit Lions at Arizona Cardinals – Game summary

Quarter	1	2	3	4	Total
Lions	0	14	17	7	**38**
**Cardinals**	7	7	7	24	**45**

at Sun Devil Stadium, Tempe, Arizona

- Date: November 18
- Game time: 2:15 p.m. MST
- Game weather: 80 °F (27 °C)
- Game attendance: 32,322
- Referee: Bill Carollo
- TV announcers (FOX): Curt Menefee, Ray Bentley, D.J. Johnson
- Box Score

Game information

**First quarter**

- ARI – Thomas Jones 3-yard run (Bill Gramática kick), 2:55. Cardinals 7–0.

**Second quarter**

- DET – Cory Schlesinger 1-yard run (Jason Hanson kick), 11:26. Tied 7–7.
- DET – David Sloan 2-yard pass from Charlie Batch (Jason Hanson kick), 7:00. Lions 14–7.
- ARI – David Boston 13-yard pass from Jake Plummer (Bill Gramática kick), 0:17. Tied 14–14.

**Third quarter**

- DET – Lamont Warren 3-yard run (Jason Hanson kick), 7:43. Lions 21–14.
- ARI – Frank Sanders 68-yard pass from Jake Plummer (Bill Gramática kick), 6:13. Tied 21–21.
- DET – David Sloan 1-yard pass from Charlie Batch (Jason Hanson kick), 4:55. Lions 28–21.
- DET – Jason Hanson 49-yard field goal, 0:02. Lions 31–21.

**Fourth quarter**

- ARI – David Boston 18-yard pass from Jake Plummer (Bill Gramática kick), 13:11. Lions 31–28.
- ARI – MarTay Jenkins 3-yard pass from Jake Plummer (Bill Gramática kick), 10:04. Cardinals 35–31.
- ARI – Fred Wakefield 20-yard interception return (Bill Gramática kick), 9:04. Cardinals 42–31.
- ARI – Bill Gramática 50-yard field goal, 6:32. Cardinals 45–31.
- DET – Lamont Warren 6-yard pass from Charlie Batch (Jason Hanson kick), 4:11. Cardinals 45–38.

**Top passers**

- DET – Charlie Batch – 36/62, 436 yards, 3 TD, 3 INT
- ARI – Jake Plummer – 21/33, 334 yards, 4 TD, INT

**Top rushers**

- DET – Lamont Warren – 9 rushes, 32 yards, TD
- ARI – Michael Pittman – 23 rushes, 81 yards

**Top receivers**

- DET – Johnnie Morton – 7 receptions, 153 yards
- ARI – Frank Sanders – 7 receptions, 127 yards, TD

==== Week 11: at San Diego Chargers ====
Week 11: Arizona Cardinals at San Diego Chargers – Game summary

Quarter	1	2	3	4	Total
**Cardinals**	0	7	3	10	**20**
Chargers	3	0	0	14	**17**

at Qualcomm Stadium, San Diego, California

- Date: November 25
- Game time: 1:05 p.m. PST/2:05 p.m. MST
- Game weather: 63 °F (17 °C)
- Game attendance: 49,398
- Referee: Walt Coleman
- TV announcers (FOX): Kenny Albert, Tim Green, Tim Ryan
- Box Score

Game information

**First quarter**

- SD – Wade Richey 26-yard field goal, 1:27. Chargers 3–0.

**Second quarter**

- ARI – David Boston 37-yard pass from Jake Plummer (Bill Gramática kick), 2:04. Cardinals 7–3.

**Third quarter**

- ARI – Bill Gramática 18-yard field goal, 10:07. Cardinals 10–3.

**Fourth quarter**

- SD – Curtis Conway 6-yard pass from Doug Flutie (Wade Richey kick), 14:19. Tied 10–10.
- ARI – Michael Pittman 1-yard run (Bill Gramática kick), 6:00. Cardinals 17–10.
- SD – Jeff Graham 28-yard pass from Doug Flutie (Wade Richey kick), 1:54. Tied 17–17.
- ARI – Bill Gramática 42-yard field goal, 0:01. Cardinals 20–17.

**Top passers**

- ARI – Jake Plummer – 19/31, 241 yards, TD, 2 INT
- SD – Doug Flutie – 33/44, 308 yards, 2 TD

**Top rushers**

- ARI – Michael Pittman – 18 rushes, 44 yards, TD
- SD – LaDainian Tomlinson – 21 rushes, 75 yards

**Top receivers**

- ARI – David Boston – 6 receptions, 121 yards, TD
- SD – Jeff Graham – 7 receptions, 98 yards, TD

==== Week 12: at Oakland Raiders ====
Week 12: Arizona Cardinals at Oakland Raiders – Game summary

Quarter	1	2	3	4	OT	Total
**Cardinals**	7	13	0	11	3	**34**
Raiders	7	0	7	17	0	**31**

at Network Associates Coliseum, Oakland, California

- Date: December 2
- Game time: 1:15 p.m. PST/2:15 p.m. MST
- Game weather: 58 °F (14 °C)
- Game attendance: 46,601
- Referee: Jeff Triplette
- TV announcers (FOX): Kenny Albert, Tim Green, D.J. Johnson
- Box Score

Game information

**First quarter**

- OAK – Tim Brown 5-yard pass from Rich Gannon (Sebastian Janikowski kick), 8:57. Raiders 7–0.
- ARI – Thomas Jones 5-yard run (Bill Gramática kick), 5:14. Tied 7–7.

**Second quarter**

- ARI – Michael Pittman 1-yard run (Bill Gramática kick), 9:48. Cardinals 14–7.
- ARI – Bill Gramática 23-yard field goal, 3:44. Cardinals 17–7.
- ARI – Bill Gramática 26-yard field goal, 0:03. Cardinals 20–7.

**Third quarter**

- OAK – Zack Crockett 1-yard run (Sebastian Janikowski kick), 8:19. Cardinals 20–14.

**Fourth quarter**

- ARI – Bill Gramática 33-yard field goal, 13:40. Cardinals 23–14.
- OAK – Tim Brown 22-yard pass from Rich Gannon (Sebastian Janikowski kick), 11:20. Cardinals 23–21.
- OAK – Sebastian Janikowski 24-yard field goal, 1:47. Raiders 24–23.
- ARI – David Boston 50-yard pass from Jake Plummer (Jake Plummer run), 1:18. Cardinals 31–24.
- OAK – Jerry Rice 2-yard pass from Rich Gannon (Sebastian Janikowski kick), 11:20. Tied 31–31.

**Overtime**

- ARI – Bill Gramática 36-yard field goal, 7:31. Cardinals 34–31.

**Top passers**

- ARI – Jake Plummer – 22/38, 249 yards, TD
- OAK – Rich Gannon – 29/45, 302 yards, 3 TD, 2 INT

**Top rushers**

- ARI – Michael Pittman – 18 rushes, 78 yards, TD
- OAK – Charlie Garner – 15 rushes, 59 yards

**Top receivers**

- ARI – David Boston – 6 receptions, 106 yards, TD
- OAK – Jerry Rice – 7 receptions, 97 yards, TD

==== Week 13: vs. Washington Redskins ====
Week 13: Washington Redskins at Arizona Cardinals – Game summary

Quarter	1	2	3	4	Total
**Redskins**	0	10	0	10	**20**
Cardinals	0	3	0	7	**10**

at Sun Devil Stadium, Tempe, Arizona

- Date: December 9
- Game time: 2:05 p.m. MST
- Game weather: 71 °F (22 °C)
- Game attendance: 40,056
- Referee: Larry Nemmers
- TV announcers (FOX): Kenny Albert, Sean Jones, D.J. Johnson
- Box Score

Game information

**First quarter**

- No scoring plays

**Second quarter**

- WAS – Zeron Flemister 2-yard pass from Tony Banks (Brett Conway kick), 14:54. Redskins 7–0.
- ARI – Bill Gramática 24-yard field goal, 6:16. Redskins 7–3.
- WAS – Brett Conway 22-yard field goal, 0:00. Redskins 10–3.

**Third quarter**

- No scoring plays

**Fourth quarter**

- WAS – Brett Conway 42-yard field goal, 12:48. Redskins 13–3.
- WAS – Stephen Davis 1-yard run (Brett Conway kick), 8:20. Redskins 20–3.
- ARI – MarTay Jenkins 10-yard pass from Jake Plummer (Bill Gramática kick), 1:16. Redskins 20–10.

**Top passers**

- WAS – Tony Banks – 19/26, 210 yards, TD
- ARI – Jake Plummer – 20/34, 253 yards, TD, INT

**Top rushers**

- WAS – Stephen Davis – 26 rushes, 110 yards, TD
- ARI – Michael Pittman – 14 rushes, 46 yards

**Top receivers**

- WAS – Michael Westbrook – 7 receptions, 82 yards
- ARI – David Boston – 6 receptions, 132 yards

==== Week 14: at New York Giants ====
Week 14: Arizona Cardinals at New York Giants – Game summary

Quarter	1	2	3	4	Total
Cardinals	3	3	0	7	**13**
**Giants**	7	0	0	10	**17**

at Giants Stadium, East Rutherford, New Jersey

- Date: December 15
- Game time: 1:35 p.m. EST/11:35 a.m. MST
- Game weather: 46 °F (8 °C)
- Game attendance: 77,913
- Referee: Dick Hantak
- TV announcers (FOX): Sam Rosen, Bill Maas, and Mike Crispino
- Box Score

Game information

**First quarter**

- ARI – Bill Gramática 42-yard field goal, 7:41. Cardinals 3–0.
- NYG – Ron Dixon 26-yard pass from Kerry Collins (Morten Andersen kick), 5:08. Giants 7–3.

**Second quarter**

- ARI – Bill Gramática 23-yard field goal, 13:33. Giants 7–6.

**Third quarter**

- No scoring plays

**Fourth quarter**

- NYG – Morten Andersen 39-yard field goal, 11:50. Giants 10–6.
- ARI – Tywan Mitchell 24-yard pass from Jake Plummer (Bill Gramática kick), 4:04. Cardinals 13–10.
- NYG – Amani Toomer 4-yard pass from Kerry Collins (Morten Andersen kick), 0:25. Giants 17–13.

**Top passers**

- ARI – Jake Plummer – 27/45, 207 yards, TD
- NYG – Kerry Collins – 14/32, 147 yards, 2 TD

**Top rushers**

- ARI – Thomas Jones – 14 rushes, 37 yards
- NYG – Tiki Barber – 16 rushes, 85 yards

**Top receivers**

- ARI – David Boston – 8 receptions, 84 yards
- NYG – Ike Hilliard – 4 receptions, 41 yards

==== Week 15: vs. Dallas Cowboys ====
Week 15: Dallas Cowboys at Arizona Cardinals – Game summary

Quarter	1	2	3	4	Total
Cowboys	3	7	0	0	**10**
**Cardinals**	0	17	0	0	**17**

at Sun Devil Stadium, Tempe, Arizona

- Date: December 23
- Game time: 2:05 p.m. MST
- Game weather: 58 °F (14 °C)
- Game attendance: 48,883
- Referee: Bill Leavy
- TV announcers (FOX): Ray Bentley, Jeff Lageman, D.J. Johnson
- Box Score

Game information

**First quarter**

- DAL – Jon Hilbert 27-yard field goal, 0:05. Cowboys 3–0.

**Second quarter**

- ARI – Ronald McKinnon 24-yard interception return (Cedric Oglesby kick), 13:19. Cardinals 7–3.
- DAL – Reggie Swinton 45-yard pass from Quincy Carter (Jon Hinton kick), 11:43. Cowboys 10–7.
- ARI – Michael Pittman 1-yard run (Cedric Oglesby kick), 4:52. Cardinals 14–10.
- ARI – Cedric Oglesby 34-yard field goal, 0:22. Cardinals 17–10.

**Third quarter**

- No scoring plays

**Fourth quarter**

- No scoring plays

**Top passers**

- DAL – Quincy Carter – 16/28, 176 yards, TD, 2 INT
- ARI – Jake Plummer – 17/31, 144 yards

**Top rushers**

- DAL – Emmitt Smith – 26 rushes, 128 yards
- ARI – Michael Pittman – 14 rushes, 58 yards, TD

**Top receivers**

- DAL – Reggie Swinton – 3 receptions, 72 yards, TD
- ARI – Frank Sanders – 2 receptions, 69 yards

==== Week 16: at Carolina Panthers ====
Week 16: Arizona Cardinals at Carolina Panthers – Game summary

Quarter	1	2	3	4	Total
**Cardinals**	7	20	3	0	**30**
Panthers	0	7	0	0	**7**

at Ericsson Stadium, Charlotte, North Carolina

- Date: December 30
- Game time: 1:35 p.m. EST/11:35 a.m. MST
- Game weather: 42 °F (6 °C)
- Game attendance: 72,025
- Referee: Mike Carey
- TV announcers (FOX): Ray Bentley, Jeff Lageman, Paul Butler
- Box Score

Game information

**First quarter**

- ARI – Ronald McKinnon 25-yard fumble return (Cedric Oglesby kick), 14:04. Cardinals 7–0.

**Second quarter**

- ARI – Cedric Oglesby 41-yard field goal, 14:56. Cardinals 10–0.
- ARI – David Boston 61-yard pass from Jake Plummer (Cedric Oglesby kick), 12:36. Cardinals 17–0.
- ARI – David Boston 5-yard pass from Jake Plummer (Cedric Oglesby kick), 9:46. Cardinals 24–0.
- CAR – Donald Hayes 7-yard pass from Chris Weinke (John Kasay kick), 2:38. Cardinals 24–7.
- ARI – Cedric Oglesby 18-yard field goal, 0:00. Cardinals 27–7.

**Third quarter**

- ARI – Cedric Oglesby 26-yard field goal, 11:27. Cardinals 30–7.

**Fourth quarter**

- No scoring plays

**Top passers**

- ARI – Jake Plummer – 12/23, 173 yards, 2 TD
- CAR – Chris Weinke – 36/63, 223 yards, TD, INT

**Top rushers**

- ARI – Michael Pittman – 12 rushes, 89 yards
- CAR – Richard Huntley – 12 rushes, 62 yards

**Top receivers**

- ARI – David Boston – 7 receptions, 127 yards, 2 TD
- CAR – Isaac Byrd – 7 receptions, 60 yards

==== Week 17: at Washington Redskins ====
Week 17: Arizona Cardinals at Washington Redskins – Game summary

Quarter	1	2	3	4	Total
Cardinals	7	10	0	0	**17**
**Redskins**	0	6	6	8	**20**

at FedEx Field, Landover, Maryland

- Date: January 6
- Game time: 1:35 p.m. EST/11:35 a.m. MST
- Game weather: 40 °F (4 °C)
- Game attendance: 61,721
- Referee: Bob McElwee
- TV announcers (FOX): Curt Menefee, Brian Baldinger, and Dave Feldman
- Box Score

Game information

**First quarter**

- ARI – Adrian Wilson 61-yard interception return (Cedric Oglesby kick), 10:40. Cardinals 7–0.

**Second quarter**

- WAS – Brett Conway 36-yard field goal, 12:27. Cardinals 7–3.
- ARI – Thomas Jones 4-yard run (Cedric Oglesby kick), 9:00. Cardinals 14–3.
- WAS – Brett Conway 33-yard field goal, 3:46. Cardinals 14–6.
- ARI – Cedric Oglesby 26-yard field goal, 0:13. Cardinals 17–6.

**Third quarter**

- WAS – Walter Rasby 5-yard pass from Tony Banks (Brett Conway kick), 3:19. Cardinals 17–12.

**Fourth quarter**

- WAS – Stephen Davis 2-yard run (two-point pass successful), 3:11. Redskins 20–17.

**Top passers**

- ARI – Jake Plummer – 11/25, 154 yards, INT
- WAS – Tony Banks – 13/25, 154 yards, TD, INT

**Top rushers**

- ARI – Thomas Jones – 7 rushes, 26 yards, TD
- WAS – Stephen Davis – 38 rushes, 148 yards, TD

**Top receivers**

- ARI – David Boston – 2 receptions, 58 yards
- WAS – Michael Westbrook – 5 receptions, 62 yards

=== Standings ===
NFC East
	W	L	T	PCT	PF	PA	STK
^{(3)} Philadelphia Eagles	11	5	0	.688	343	208	W2
Washington Redskins	8	8	0	.500	256	303	W2
New York Giants	7	9	0	.438	294	321	L2
Arizona Cardinals	7	9	0	.438	295	343	L1
Dallas Cowboys	5	11	0	.313	246	338	L1
