= 2001 NFL draft =

Selection of American football players

General information
- Date: April 21–22, 2001
- Location: Theater at MSG in New York City, New York
- Network: ESPN

Overview
- 246 total selections in 7 rounds
- League: NFL
- First selection: Michael Vick, QB; Atlanta Falcons
- Mr. Irrelevant: Tevita Ofahengaue, TE; Arizona Cardinals
- Most selections (12): Buffalo Bills; Seattle Seahawks
- Fewest selections (5): Washington Redskins
- Hall of Famers: 4: RB LaDainian Tomlinson; DT Richard Seymour; G Steve Hutchinson; QB Drew Brees

The 2001 NFL draft was the National Football League's (NFL) 66th annual draft of newly eligible professional football players. The draft, which is officially referred to as the "NFL Player Selection Meeting", was held at the Theater at Madison Square Garden in New York City, New York, on April 21–22, 2001.

Each team is assigned one pick per round with the order based generally on the reverse order of finish in the previous season with the team with the worst record receiving the first draft slot. Exceptions to this are the Super Bowl participants from the previous season—the champion Baltimore Ravens were assigned the final draft slot and the runner-up New York Giants assigned the 30th slot in each round. The draft was broadcast on ESPN and ESPN2. Due to previous trades, the Dallas Cowboys and Tennessee Titans did not have selections in the first round. More than half of the players selected in the draft's first round (17 of 31) would eventually be elected to at least one Pro Bowl.

The first player selected in the draft was quarterback Michael Vick from Virginia Tech, who was selected by the Atlanta Falcons after they acquired the first pick in a trade with the San Diego Chargers. Vick spent six seasons with the Falcons before being sentenced to 21 months in prison for his involvement in an illegal interstate dog fighting ring, eventually rebounding his career with the Philadelphia Eagles after being released from prison and winning the NFL's Comeback Player of the Year Award in 2010.

Florida State quarterback Chris Weinke, the 2000 winner of the Heisman Trophy, awarded to the player deemed most outstanding in college football, was selected in the fourth round by the Carolina Panthers. After being a regular starter for the Panthers in his first season, during which Carolina posted a 1–15 record, Weinke played only 12 games over his final five seasons before being released. The last player selected, who traditionally receives the unofficial title Mr. Irrelevant, was Tevita Ofahengaue of Brigham Young University, who was chosen by the Arizona Cardinals. Ofahengaue never played in the NFL, and in 2011 was charged with stealing gasoline from a construction company in Salt Lake City. He is currently the Player Personnel Director at BYU.

There were 31 compensatory selections distributed among 16 teams during rounds three through seven, with the Jacksonville Jaguars and Buffalo Bills receiving 4 picks each. The University of Miami was the college with the most players selected in the first round, with Dan Morgan, Damione Lewis, Santana Moss and Reggie Wayne all picked at that stage. Across the whole draft, however, Florida State University had the most players selected, a total of nine compared to Miami's seven.

No teams elected to claim any players in the 2001 supplemental draft.

== Player selections ==
*	compensatory selection
^	supplemental compensatory selection
†	Pro Bowler
‡	Hall of Famer

Positions key
Offense	Defense	Special teams
QB — Quarterback; RB — Running back; FB — Fullback; WR — Wide receiver; TE — Tight end; OL — Offensive lineman; T — Tackle; G — Guard; C — Center	DL — Defensive lineman; DT — Defensive tackle (Note: Includes nose tackle (NT)); DE — Defensive end; EDGE — Edge rusher; LB — Linebacker (Note: Includes middle linebacker (MLB/MIKE), weakside linebacker (WILL), strongside linebacker (SAM), off-ball linebacker, and outside linebacker (OLB)); DB — Defensive back; CB — Cornerback; S — Safety (Note: Includes free safety (FS) and strong safety (SS))	K — Kicker (Note: Also known as a placekicker (PK)); P — Punter; LS — Long snapper; RS — Return specialist (Note: Includes kickoff and punt returners)

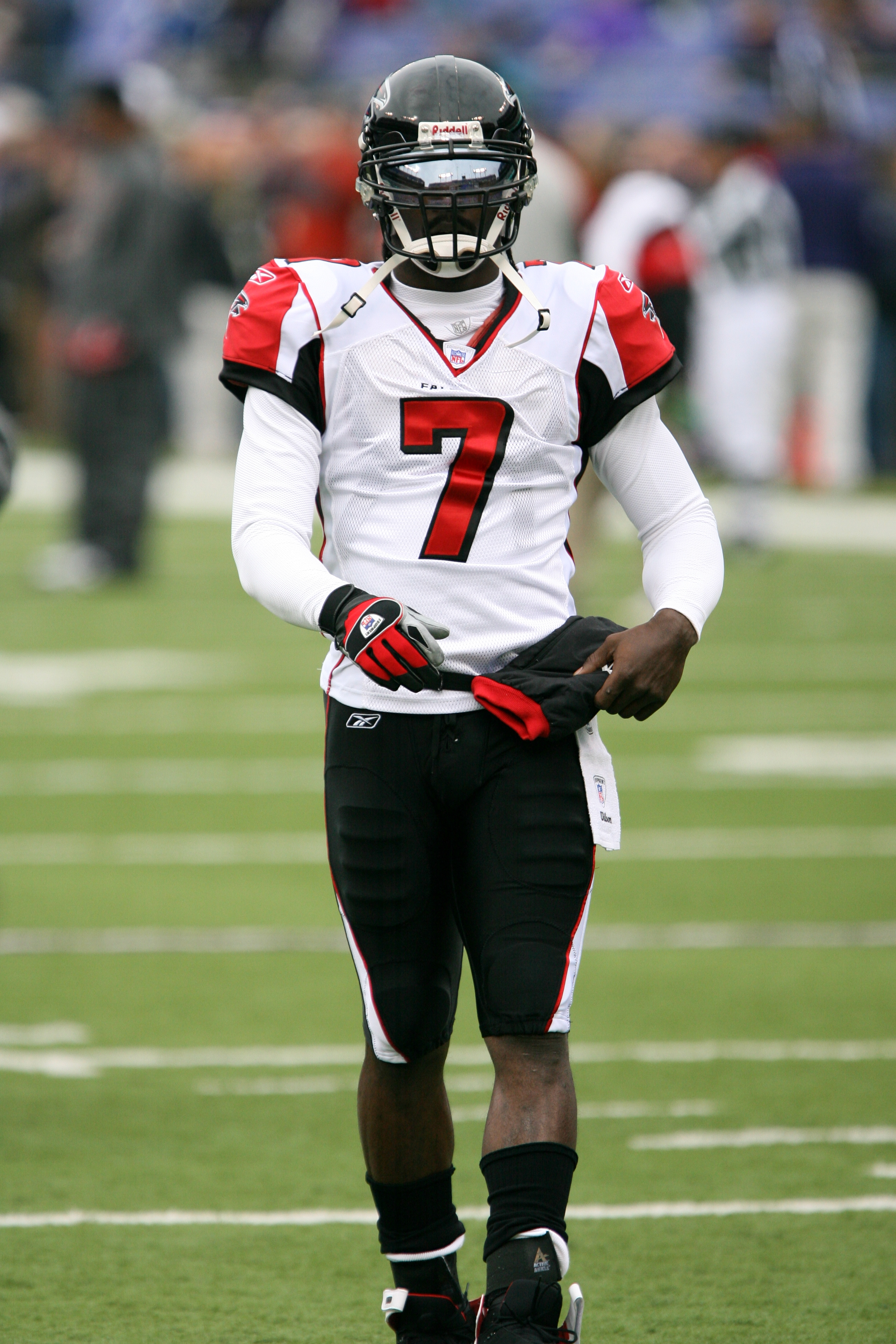
Quarterback Michael Vick was chosen as the first draft pick overall by the Atlanta Falcons.

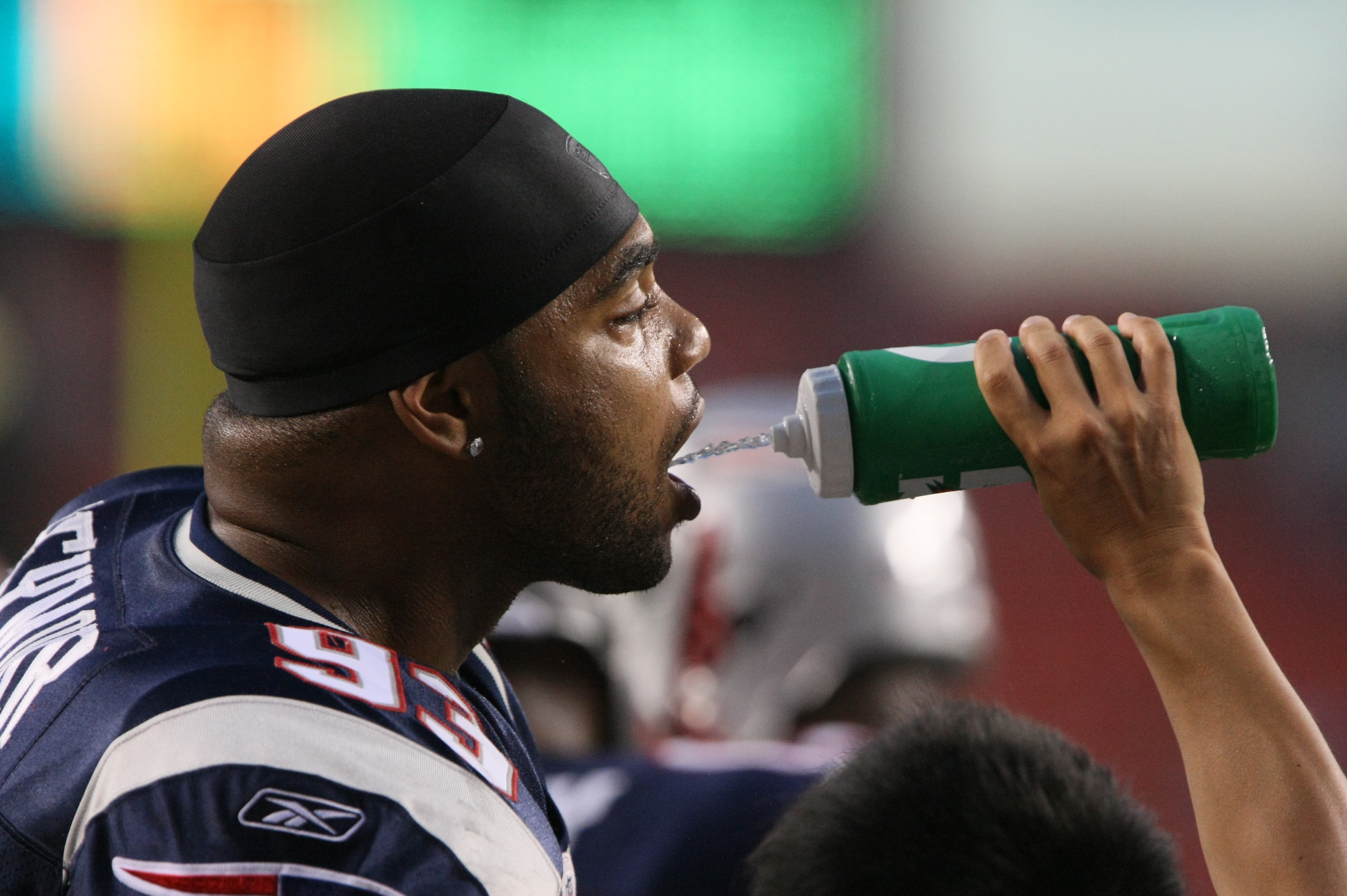
Richard Seymour was drafted number sixth overall and went on to win three Super Bowl championships with the New England Patriots. A three-time first-team All-Pro, he was elected to the Pro Football Hall of Fame in 2022.

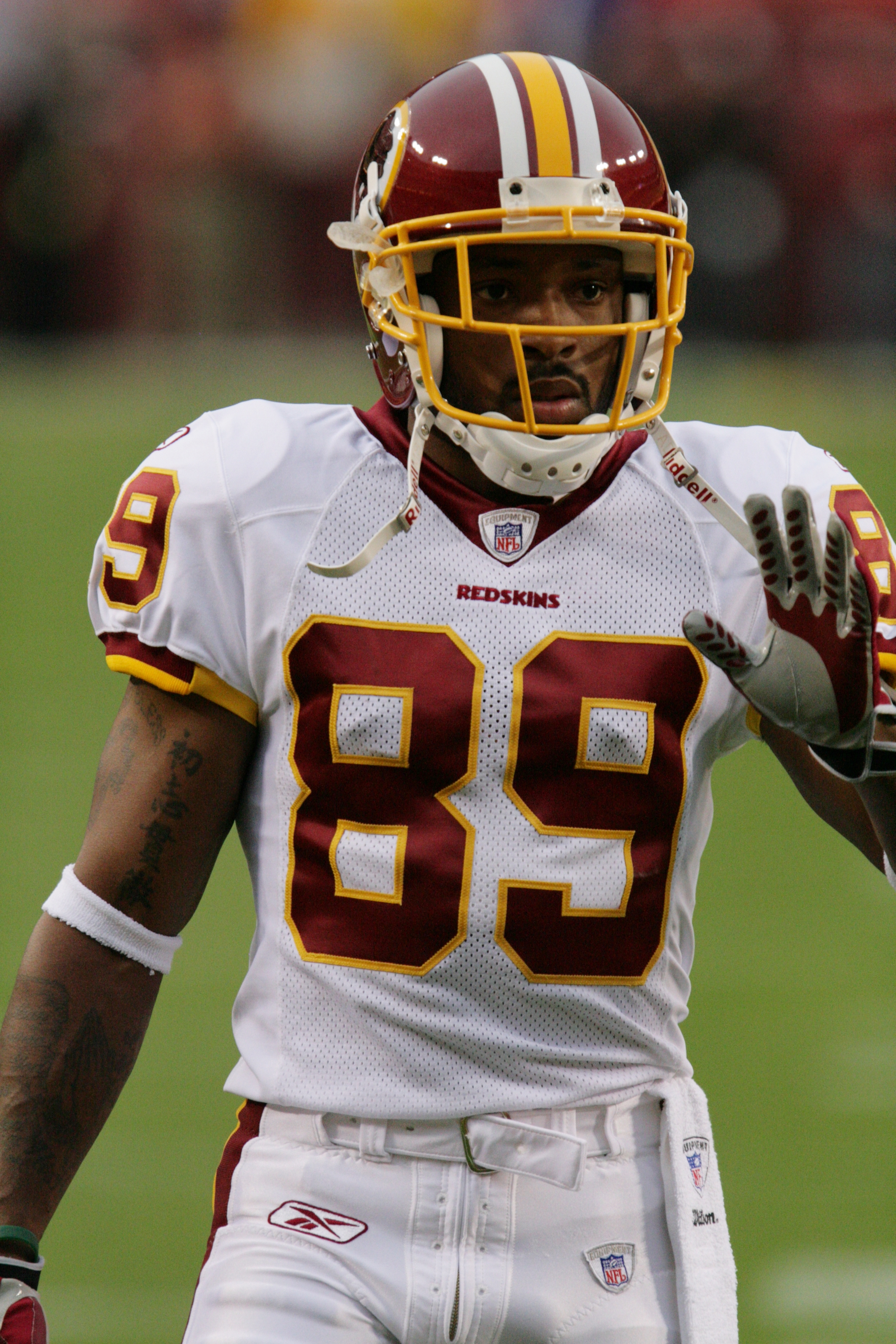
Santana Moss was one of four players from the University of Miami chosen in the first round, more than any other school.

Although T. J. Houshmandzadeh was not selected until the final round of the draft, he went on to play in the Pro Bowl in 2007.

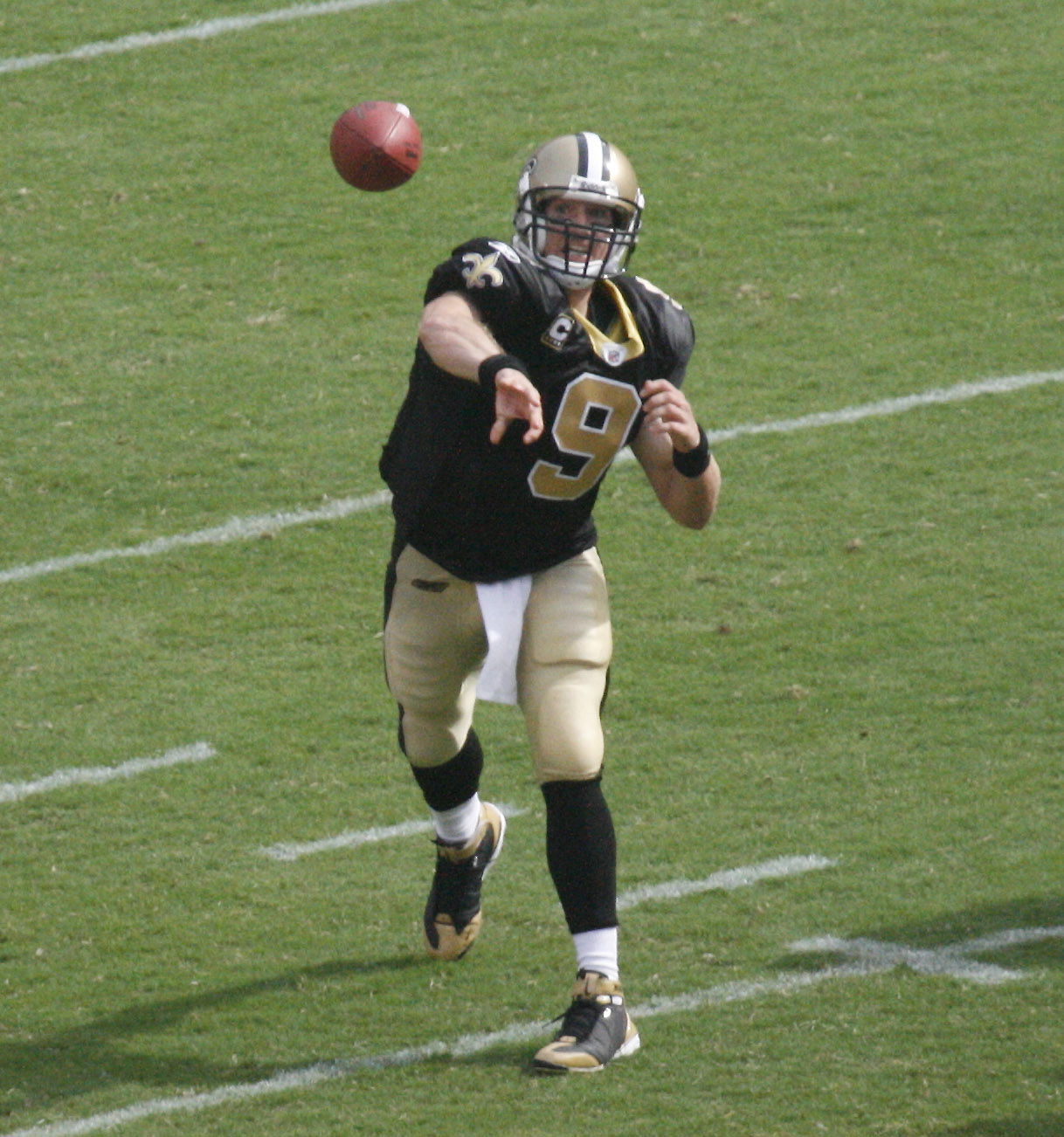
Drew Brees was the first pick of the second round and went on to lead the New Orleans Saints to their first Super Bowl in franchise history, along with setting numerous NFL records. He was the last active player from this draft.

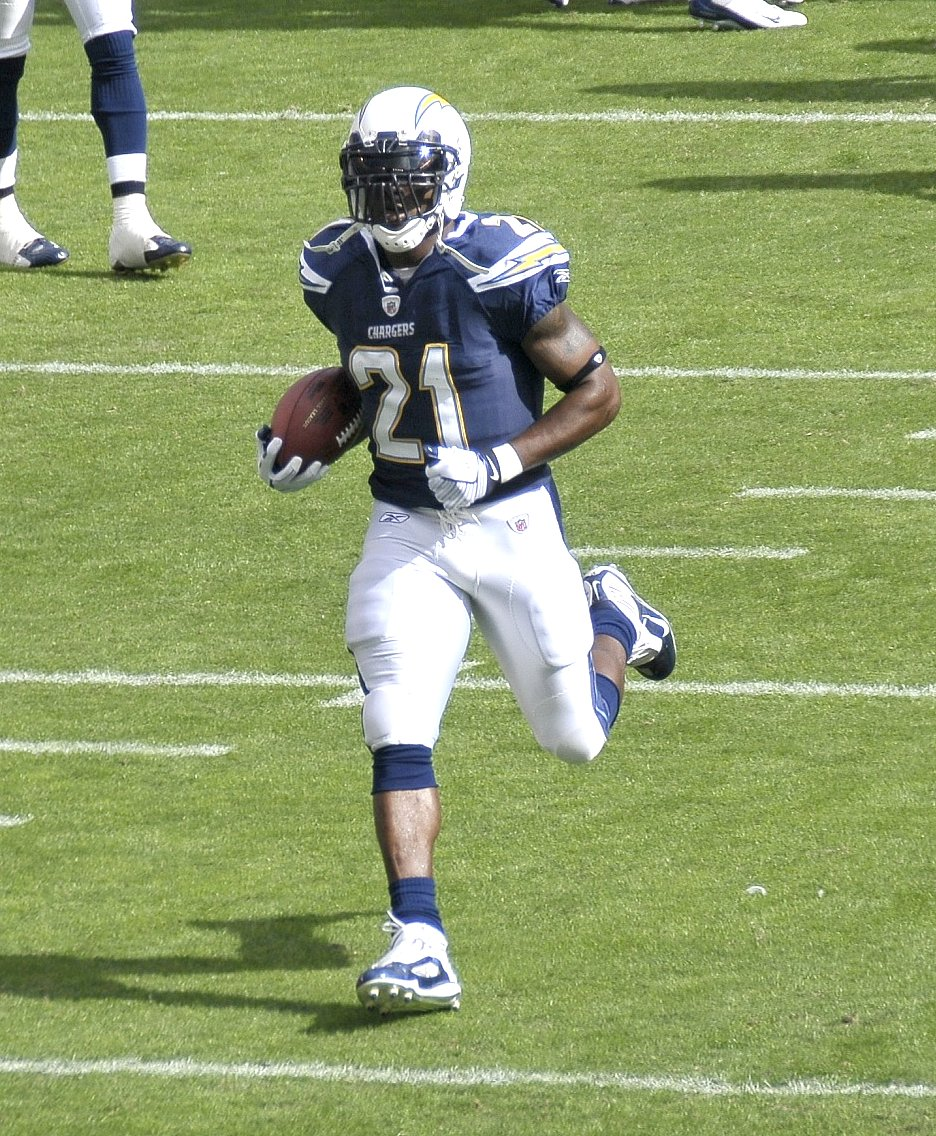
LaDainian Tomlinson was the first running back picked in the draft and set multiple NFL records in rushing touchdowns and yards in his nine seasons with the San Diego Chargers.

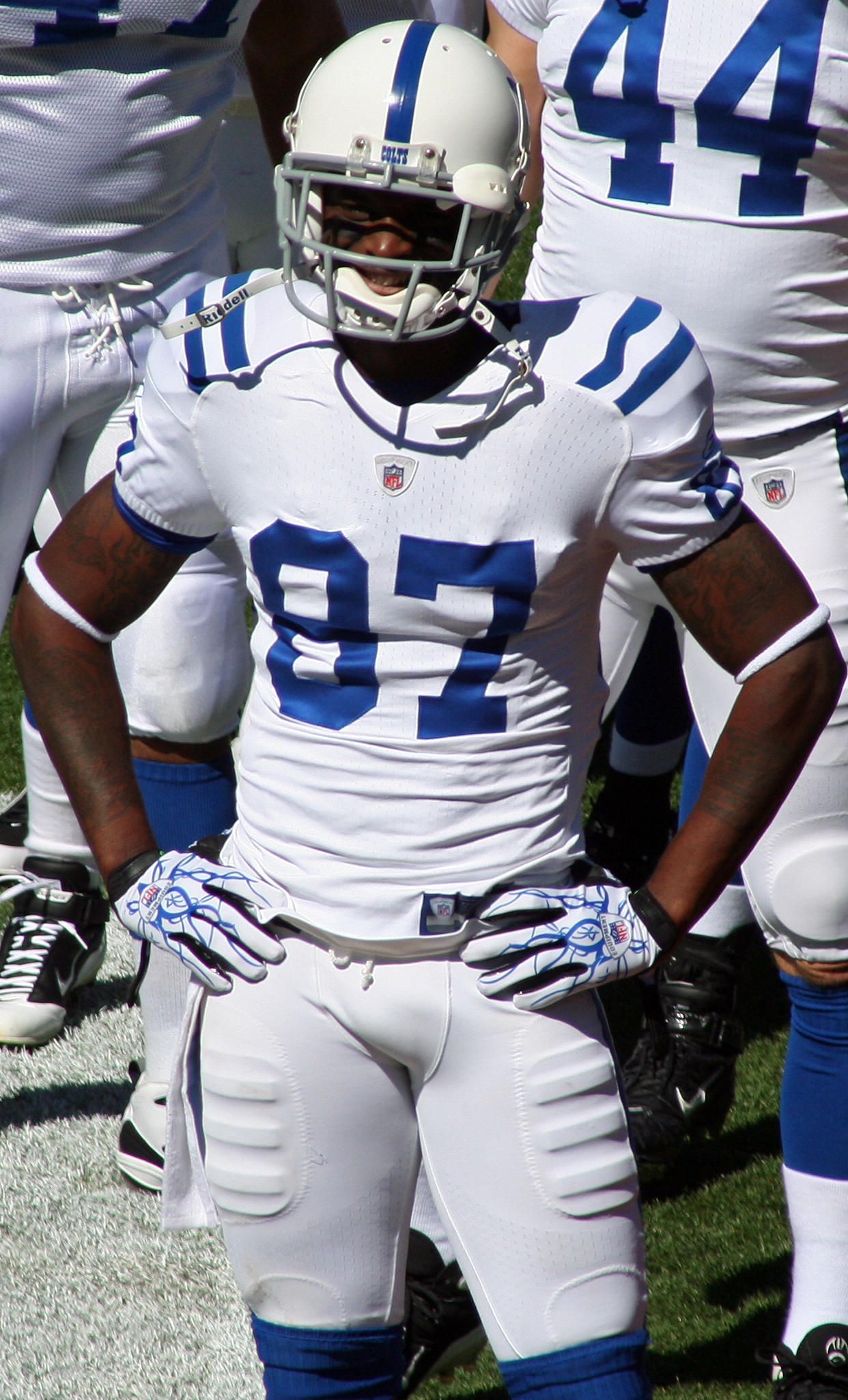
Wide receiver Reggie Wayne was a late first-round pick and is currently tenth in career total receiving yards .

Rnd.	Pick	Team	Player	Pos.	College	Notes
1	1	Atlanta Falcons	Michael Vick ^{†}	QB	Virginia Tech	from San Diego (Note: No. 1: San Diego → Atlanta (PD). San Diego traded a first-round selection (1st overall) to Atlanta in exchange for first- and third-round selections (5th and 67th overall), a 2002 second-round selection and WR/KR Tim Dwight.)
1	2	Arizona Cardinals	Leonard Davis ^{†}	G	Texas	
1	3	Cleveland Browns	Gerard Warren	DT	Florida	
1	4	Cincinnati Bengals	Justin Smith ^{†}	DE	Missouri	
1	5	San Diego Chargers	LaDainian Tomlinson^{‡}^{†}	RB	TCU	from Atlanta (Note: No. 5: Atlanta → San Diego (PD). See Round 1: San Diego → Atlanta.)
1	6	New England Patriots	Richard Seymour^{‡}^{†}	DT	Georgia	
1	7	San Francisco 49ers	Andre Carter ^{†}	DE	California	from Dallas via Seattle (Note: No. 7: Dallas → Seattle → San Francisco. Multiple trades: Dallas → Seattle (PD). Dallas traded a first-round selection (7th overall) and a 2000 first-round selection to Seattle in exchange for WR Joey Galloway. Seattle → San Francisco (D). Seattle traded first- and sixth-round selections (7th and 191st overall) to San Francisco in exchange for first-, third- and seventh-round selections (9th, 82nd and 222nd overall).)
1	8	Chicago Bears	David Terrell	WR	Michigan	
1	9	Seattle Seahawks	Koren Robinson ^{†}	WR	NC State	from San Francisco (Note: No. 9: San Francisco → Seattle (D). See Round 1: Seattle → San Francisco.)
1	10	Green Bay Packers	Jamal Reynolds	DE	Florida State	from Seattle (Note: No. 10: Seattle → Green Bay (PD). Seattle traded first- and third-round selections (10th and 72nd overall) to Green Bay in exchange for a first-round selection (17th overall) and QB Matt Hasselbeck.)
1	11	Carolina Panthers	Dan Morgan ^{†}	LB	Miami (FL)	
1	12	St. Louis Rams	Damione Lewis	DT	Miami (FL)	from Kansas City (Note: No. 12: Kansas City → St. Louis (PD). Kansas City traded first- and second-round selections (12th and 42nd overall) to St. Louis in exchange for a fifth-round selection (150th overall) and QB Trent Green.)
1	13	Jacksonville Jaguars	Marcus Stroud ^{†}	DT	Georgia	
1	14	Tampa Bay Buccaneers	Kenyatta Walker	T	Florida	from Buffalo (Note: No. 14: Buffalo → Tampa Bay (D). Buffalo traded a first-round selection (14th overall) to Tampa Bay in exchange for first- and second-round selections (21st and 51st overall).)
1	15	Washington Redskins	Rod Gardner	WR	Clemson	
1	16	New York Jets	Santana Moss ^{†}	WR	Miami (FL)	from Pittsburgh (Note: No. 16: Pittsburgh → NY Jets (D). Pittsburgh traded a first-round selection (16th overall) to the NY Jets in exchange for first-, fourth- and sixth-round selections (19th, 111th and 181st overall).)
1	17	Seattle Seahawks	Steve Hutchinson^{‡}^{†}	G	Michigan	from Green Bay (Note: No. 17: Green Bay → Seattle (PD). See Round 1: Seattle → Green Bay.)
1	18	Detroit Lions	Jeff Backus	T	Michigan	
1	19	Pittsburgh Steelers	Casey Hampton ^{†}	DT	Texas	from NY Jets (Note: No. 19: NY Jets → Pittsburgh (D). See Round 1: Pittsburgh → NY Jets.)
1	20	St. Louis Rams	Adam Archuleta	S	Arizona State	
1	21	Buffalo Bills	Nate Clements ^{†}	CB	Ohio State	from Tampa Bay (Note: No. 21: Tampa Bay → Buffalo (D). See Round 1: Buffalo → Tampa Bay.)
1	22	New York Giants	Will Allen	CB	Syracuse	from Indianapolis (Note: No. 22: Indianapolis → NY Giants (D). Indianapolis traded a first-round selection to the NY Giants in exchange for first-, third- and sixth-round selections (30th, 91st and 193rd overall).)
1	23	New Orleans Saints	Deuce McAllister ^{†}	RB	Ole Miss	
1	24	Denver Broncos	Willie Middlebrooks	CB	Minnesota	
1	25	Philadelphia Eagles	Freddie Mitchell	WR	UCLA	
1	26	Miami Dolphins	Jamar Fletcher	CB	Wisconsin	
1	27	Minnesota Vikings	Michael Bennett ^{†}	RB	Wisconsin	
1	28	Oakland Raiders	Derrick Gibson	S	Florida State	
1	29	St. Louis Rams	Ryan Pickett	DT	Ohio State	from Tennessee (Note: No. 29: Tennessee → St. Louis (PD). Tennessee traded a first-round selection (29th overall) to St. Louis in exchange for DE Kevin Carter.)
1	30	Indianapolis Colts	Reggie Wayne ^{†}	WR	Miami (FL)	from NY Giants (Note: No. 30: NY Giants → Indianapolis (D). See Round 1: Indianapolis → NY Giants.)
1	31	Baltimore Ravens	Todd Heap ^{†}	TE	Arizona State	
2	32	San Diego Chargers	Drew Brees^{‡}^{†}	QB	Purdue	
2	33	Cleveland Browns	Quincy Morgan	WR	Kansas State	
2	34	Arizona Cardinals	Kyle Vanden Bosch ^{†}	DE	Nebraska	
2	35	Atlanta Falcons	Alge Crumpler ^{†}	TE	North Carolina	
2	36	Cincinnati Bengals	Chad Johnson ^{†}	WR	Oregon State	
2	37	Indianapolis Colts	Idrees Bashir	S	Memphis	from Dallas (Note: No. 37: Dallas → Indianapolis (D). Dallas traded a second-round selection (37th overall) to Indianapolis in exchange for second- and third-round selections (52nd and 81st overall).)
2	38	Chicago Bears	Anthony Thomas	RB	Michigan	2001 Offensive Rookie of the Year
2	39	Pittsburgh Steelers	Kendrell Bell ^{†}	LB	Georgia	2001 Defensive Rookie of the Year; from New England (Note: No. 39: New England → Pittsburgh (D). New England traded a second-round selection to Pittsburgh in exchange for second- and fourth-round selections (50th and 112th overall).)
2	40	Seattle Seahawks	Ken Lucas	CB	Ole Miss	
2	41	Green Bay Packers	Robert Ferguson	WR	Texas A&M	from San Francisco (Note: No. 41: San Francisco → Green Bay (PD). San Francisco traded second-, third- and fourth-round selections (41st, 71st and 105th overall) to Green Bay in exchange for a second-round selection, two third-round selections, a sixth-round selection and a seventh-round selection (47th, 80th, 82nd, 179th and 222nd overall).)
2	42	St. Louis Rams	Tommy Polley	LB	Florida State	from Kansas City (Note: No. 42: Kansas City → St. Louis (PD). See Round 1: Kansas City → St. Louis.)
2	43	Jacksonville Jaguars	Maurice Williams	T	Michigan	
2	44	Carolina Panthers	Kris Jenkins ^{†}	DT	Maryland	
2	45	Washington Redskins	Fred Smoot	CB	Mississippi State	
2	46	Buffalo Bills	Aaron Schobel ^{†}	DE	TCU	
2	47	San Francisco 49ers	Jamie Winborn	LB	Vanderbilt	from Green Bay (Note: No. 47: Green Bay → San Francisco (PD). See Round 2: San Francisco → Green Bay.)
2	48	New England Patriots	Matt Light ^{†}	T	Purdue	from Detroit (Note: No. 48: Detroit → New England (D). Detroit traded a second-round selection (48th overall) to New England in exchange for second- and sixth-round selections (50th and 173rd overall).)
2	49	New York Jets	LaMont Jordan	RB	Maryland	
2	50	Detroit Lions	Dominic Raiola	C	Nebraska	from Pittsburgh via New England (Note: No. 50: Pittsburgh → New England → Detroit. Multiple trades: Pittsburgh → New England (D). See Round 2: New England → Pittsburgh. New England → Detroit (D). See Round 2: Detroit → New England.)
2	51	Denver Broncos	Paul Toviessi	DE	Marshall	from Tampa Bay via Buffalo (Note: No. 51: Tampa Bay → Buffalo → Denver. Multiple trades: Tampa Bay → Buffalo (D). See Round 1: Buffalo → Tampa Bay. Buffalo → Denver (D). Buffalo traded a second-round selection (51st overall) to Denver in exchange for second-round and fourth-round selections (58th and 110th overall).)
2	52	Miami Dolphins	Chris Chambers ^{†}	WR	Wisconsin	from Indianapolis via Dallas (Note: No. 52: Indianapolis → Dallas → Miami. Multiple trades: Indianapolis → Dallas (D). See Round 2: Dallas → Indianapolis. Dallas → Miami (D). Dallas traded a second-round selection (52nd overall) to Miami in exchange for second- and fourth-round selections (56th and 122nd overall).)
2	53	Dallas Cowboys	Quincy Carter	QB	Georgia	from New Orleans (Note: No. 53: New Orleans → Dallas (D). New Orleans traded a second-round selection (53rd overall) to Dallas in exchange for two third-round selections (70th and 81st overall).)
2	54	Arizona Cardinals	Michael Stone	S	Memphis	from St. Louis (Note: No. 54: St. Louis → Arizona (D). St. Louis traded second- and fourth-round selections (54th and 123rd overall) to Arizona in exchange for CB Aeneas Williams.)
2	55	Philadelphia Eagles	Quinton Caver	LB	Arkansas	
2	56	Dallas Cowboys	Tony Dixon	S	Alabama	from Miami (Note: No. 56: Miami → Dallas (D). See Round 2: Dallas → Miami.)
2	57	Minnesota Vikings	Willie Howard	DE	Stanford	
2	58	Buffalo Bills	Travis Henry ^{†}	RB	Tennessee	from Denver (Note: No. 58: Denver → Buffalo (D). See Round 2: Buffalo → Denver.)
2	59	Oakland Raiders	Marques Tuiasosopo	QB	Washington	
2	60	Tennessee Titans	Andre Dyson	CB	Utah	
2	61	Detroit Lions	Shaun Rogers ^{†}	DT	Texas	from NY Giants (Note: No. 61: NY Giants → Detroit (D). The NY Giants traded a second-round selection (61st overall) to Detroit in exchange for third- and fourth-round selections (78th and 114th overall).)
2	62	Baltimore Ravens	Gary Baxter	CB	Baylor	
3	63	Philadelphia Eagles	Derrick Burgess ^{†}	DE	Ole Miss	from San Diego (Note: No. 63: San Diego → Philadelphia (D). San Diego traded a third-round selection (63rd overall) to Philadelphia in exchange for a 2000 fourth-round selection.)
3	64	Arizona Cardinals	Adrian Wilson ^{†}	S	NC State	
3	65	Cleveland Browns	James Jackson	RB	Miami (FL)	
3	66	Cincinnati Bengals	Sean Brewer	TE	San Jose State	
3	67	San Diego Chargers	Tay Cody	CB	Florida State	from Atlanta (Note: No. 67: Atlanta → San Diego (PD). See Round 1: San Diego → Atlanta.)
3	68	Chicago Bears	Mike Gandy	T	Notre Dame	
3	69	Minnesota Vikings	Eric Kelly	CB	Kentucky	from New England (Note: No. 69: New England → Minnesota (D). New England traded a third-round selection (69th overall) to Minnesota in exchange for third- and fourth-round selections (86th and 119th overall).)
3	70	New Orleans Saints	Sedrick Hodge	LB	North Carolina	from Dallas (Note: No. 70: Dallas → New Orleans (D). See Round 2: New Orleans → Dallas.)
3	71	Green Bay Packers	Bhawoh Jue	S	Penn State	from San Francisco (Note: No. 71: San Francisco → Green Bay (PD). See Round 2: San Francisco → Green Bay.)
3	72	Green Bay Packers	Torrance Marshall	LB	Oklahoma	from Seattle (Note: No. 72: Seattle → Green Bay (PD). See Round 1: Seattle → Green Bay.)
3	73	Jacksonville Jaguars	Eric Westmoreland	LB	Tennessee	
3	74	Carolina Panthers	Steve Smith ^{†}	WR	Utah	
3	75	Kansas City Chiefs	Eric Downing	DT	Syracuse	
3	76	Buffalo Bills	Ron Edwards	DT	Texas A&M	
3	77	Kansas City Chiefs	Marvin Minnis	WR	Florida State	from Washington (Note: No. 77: Washington → Kansas City (PD). Washington sent a third-round selection (77th overall) and a 2002 third-round selection to Kansas City in exchange for the rights to head coach Marty Schottenheimer, who was still under contract with the Chiefs after resigning as their head coach after the 1998 season.)
3	78	New York Giants	Will Peterson	CB	Western Illinois	from Detroit (Note: No. 78: Detroit → NY Giants (D). See Round 2: NY Giants → Detroit.)
3	79	New York Jets	Kareem McKenzie	T	Penn State	
3	80	San Francisco 49ers	Kevan Barlow	RB	Pittsburgh	from Green Bay (Note: No. 80: Green Bay → San Francisco (PD). See Round 2: San Francisco → Green Bay.)
3	81	New Orleans Saints	Kenny Smith	DT	Alabama	from Indianapolis via Dallas (Note: No. 81: Indianapolis → Dallas → New Orleans. Multiple trades: Indianapolis → Dallas (D). See Round 2: Dallas → Indianapolis. Dallas → New Orleans (D). See Round 2: New Orleans → Dallas.)
3	82	Seattle Seahawks	Heath Evans	FB	Auburn	from New Orleans via Green Bay and San Francisco (Note: No. 82: New Orleans → Green Bay → San Francisco → Seattle. Multiple trades: New Orleans → Green Bay (PD). New Orleans traded a third-round selection (82nd overall) and LB K. D. Williams to Green Bay in exchange for QB Aaron Brooks and TE Lamont Hall. Green Bay → San Francisco (PD). See Round 2: San Francisco → Green Bay. San Francisco → Seattle (D). See Round 1: Seattle → San Francisco.)
3	83	St. Louis Rams	Brian Allen	LB	Florida State	
3	84	Tampa Bay Buccaneers	Dwight Smith	S	Akron	
3	85	Miami Dolphins	Travis Minor	RB	Florida State	
3	86	New England Patriots	Brock Williams	CB	Notre Dame	from Minnesota (Note: No. 86: Minnesota → New England (D). See Round 3: New England → Minnesota.)
3	87	Denver Broncos	Reggie Hayward	DE	Iowa State	
3	88	Miami Dolphins	Morlon Greenwood	LB	Syracuse	from Philadelphia (Note: No. 88: Philadelphia → Miami (D). Philadelphia traded third- and sixth-round selections (88th and 187th overall) from Philadelphia in exchange for the Dolphins' second-round selection (No. 59) in the 2002 NFL draft.)
3	89	Oakland Raiders	DeLawrence Grant	LB	Oregon State	
3	90	Tennessee Titans	Shad Meier	TE	Kansas State	
3	91	Indianapolis Colts	Cory Bird	S	Virginia Tech	from NY Giants (Note: No. 91: NY Giants → Indianapolis (D). See Round 1: Indianapolis → NY Giants.)
3	92	Baltimore Ravens	Casey Rabach	C	Wisconsin	
3*	93	Dallas Cowboys	Willie Blade	DT	Mississippi State	
3*	94	Jacksonville Jaguars	James Boyd	S	Penn State	
3*	95	Buffalo Bills	Jonas Jennings	T	Georgia	
4	96	New England Patriots	Kenyatta Jones	T	South Florida	from San Diego (Note: No. 96: San Diego → New England (D). San Diego traded a fourth-round selection (96th overall) to New England in exchange for fourth- and fifth-round selections (112th and 139th overall).)
4	97	Cleveland Browns	Anthony Henry	CB	South Florida	
4	98	Arizona Cardinals	Bill Gramatica	K	South Florida	
4	99	Atlanta Falcons	Roberto Garza	C	Texas A&M–Kingsville	
4	100	Cincinnati Bengals	Rudi Johnson ^{†}	RB	Auburn	
4	101	New York Jets	Jamie Henderson	CB	Georgia	from New England (Note: No. 101: New England → NY Jets (PD). New England sent a fourth-round selection, and 2000 first- and seventh-round selections to the NY Jets in exchange for a fifth-round selection (149th overall), a 2002 seventh-round selection and the rights to head coach Bill Belichick.)
4	102	Atlanta Falcons	Matt Stewart	LB	Vanderbilt	from Dallas (Note: No. 102: Dallas → Atlanta (PD). Dallas traded a fourth-round selection (102nd overall) and a 2002 seventh-round selection to Atlanta in exchange for TE O. J. Santiago. (Note: "O.J. to Big D: Cowboys trade two picks to Falcons for TE Santiago". Sports Illustrated. AP. August 27, 2000.))
4	103	Chicago Bears	Karon Riley	DE	Minnesota	
4	104	Seattle Seahawks	Orlando Huff	LB	Fresno State	
4	105	Green Bay Packers	Bill Ferrario	G	Wisconsin	from San Francisco (Note: No. 105: San Francisco → Green Bay (PD). See Round 2: San Francisco → Green Bay.)
4	106	Carolina Panthers	Chris Weinke	QB	Florida State	2000 Heisman Trophy winner
4	107	Kansas City Chiefs	Monty Beisel	LB	Kansas State	
4	108	Kansas City Chiefs	George Layne	RB	TCU	from Jacksonville (Note: No. 108: Jacksonville → Kansas City (PD). Jacksonville traded a conditional fourth-round selection (108th overall) to Kansas City in exchange for G Brenden Stai. The fourth-round selection was upgraded from the fifth round after Stai started all 16 games for the Jaguars in 2000.)
4	109	Washington Redskins	Sage Rosenfels	QB	Iowa State	
4	110	Buffalo Bills	Brandon Spoon	LB	North Carolina	from Denver (Note: No. 110: Denver → Buffalo (D). See Round 2: Buffalo → Denver.)
4	111	Pittsburgh Steelers	Mathias Nkwenti	T	Temple	from NY Jets (Note: No. 111: NY Jets → Pittsburgh (D). See Round 1: Pittsburgh → NY Jets.)
4	112	San Diego Chargers	Carlos Polk	LB	Nebraska	from Pittsburgh via New England (Note: No. 112: Pittsburgh → New England → San Diego. Multiple trades: Pittsburgh → New England (D). See Round 2: New England → Pittsburgh. New England → San Diego (D). See Round 4: San Diego → New England.)
4	113	Denver Broncos	Ben Hamilton	G	Minnesota	from Green Bay (Note: No. 113: Green Bay → Denver (PD). Green Bay traded a fourth-round selection (113th overall) to Denver in exchange for LB Nate Wayne.)
4	114	New York Giants	Cedric Scott	DE	Southern Miss	from Detroit (Note: No. 114: Detroit → NY Giants (D). See Round 2: NY Giants → Detroit.)
4	115	New Orleans Saints	Moran Norris	FB	Kansas	
4	116	St. Louis Rams	Milton Wynn	WR	Washington State	
4	117	Tampa Bay Buccaneers	John Howell	S	Colorado State	
4	118	Indianapolis Colts	Ryan Diem	T	Northern Illinois	
4	119	New England Patriots	Jabari Holloway	TE	Notre Dame	from Minnesota (Note: No. 119: Minnesota → New England (D). See Round 3: New England → Minnesota.)
4	120	Denver Broncos	Nick Harris	P	California	
4	121	Philadelphia Eagles	Correll Buckhalter	RB	Nebraska	
4	122	Dallas Cowboys	Markus Steele	LB	USC	from Miami (Note: No. 122: Miami → Dallas (D). See Round 2: Dallas → Miami.)
4	123	Arizona Cardinals	Marcus Bell	DT	Memphis	from Oakland via St. Louis (Note: No. 123: Oakland → St. Louis → Arizona. Multiple trades: Oakland → St. Louis (PD). Oakland sent a fourth-round selection (123rd overall) to St. Louis as compensation for signing restricted free agent TE Roland Williams. St. Louis → Arizona (D). See Round 2: St. Louis → Arizona.)
4	124	Tennessee Titans	Justin McCareins	WR	Northern Illinois	
4	125	New York Giants	Jesse Palmer	QB	Florida	
4	126	Baltimore Ravens	Edgerton Hartwell	LB	Western Illinois	
4*	127	Seattle Seahawks	Curtis Fuller	S	TCU	
4*	128	Seattle Seahawks	Floyd Womack	T	Mississippi State	
4*	129	St. Louis Rams	Brandon Manumaleuna	TE	Arizona	
4*	130	Minnesota Vikings	Shawn Worthen	DT	TCU	
4*	131	Minnesota Vikings	Cedric James	WR	TCU	
5	132	San Diego Chargers	Elliot Silvers	T	Washington	
5	133	Arizona Cardinals	Mario Fatafehi	DT	Kansas State	
5	134	Cleveland Browns	Jeremiah Pharms	LB	Washington	
5	135	Cincinnati Bengals	Victor Leyva	T	Arizona State	
5	136	Atlanta Falcons	Vinny Sutherland	WR	Purdue	
5	137	Dallas Cowboys	Matt Lehr	G	Virginia Tech	
5	138	Chicago Bears	Bernard Robertson	T	Tulane	
5	139	San Diego Chargers	Zeke Moreno	LB	USC	from New England (Note: No. 139: New England → San Diego (D). See Round 4: San Diego → New England.)
5	140	Seattle Seahawks	Alex Bannister ^{†}	WR	Eastern Kentucky	
5	141	Kansas City Chiefs	Billy Baber	TE	Virginia	
5	142	Jacksonville Jaguars	David Leaverton	P	Tennessee	
5	143	Carolina Panthers	Jarrod Cooper	S	Kansas State	
5	144	Buffalo Bills	Marques Sullivan	T	Illinois	
5	145	St. Louis Rams	Jerametrius Butler	CB	Kansas State	from Washington (Note: No. 145: Washington → St. Louis (D). Washington traded a fifth-round selection (145th overall) to St. Louis in exchange for fifth- and sixth-round selections (154th and 186th overall).)
5	146	Pittsburgh Steelers	Chukky Okobi	C	Purdue	
5	147	Philadelphia Eagles	Tony Stewart	TE	Penn State	from Green Bay (Note: No. 147: Green Bay → Philadelphia (D). Green Bay traded a conditional fifth-round selection (147th overall) to Philadelphia in exchange for KR/PR Allen Rossum. The pick was conditional upon the results of a previous conditional trade the Packers had made with the Broncos for LB Nate Wayne; because Wayne met the conditions for Green Bay to send a fourth-round selection to Denver, Philadelphia received a fifth-round selection instead.)
5	148	Detroit Lions	Scotty Anderson	WR	Grambling State	
5	149	Detroit Lions	Mike McMahon	QB	Rutgers	from NY Jets via New England (Note: No. 149: NY Jets → New England → Detroit. Multiple trades: NY Jets → New England (PD). See Round 4: No. 101: New England → NY Jets. New England → Detroit (D). New England traded a fifth-round selection (149th overall) to Detroit in exchange for sixth- and seventh-round selections (180th and 216th overall).)
5	150	Kansas City Chiefs	Derrick Blaylock	RB	Stephen F. Austin	from St. Louis (Note: No. 150: St. Louis → Kansas City (PD). See Round 1: Kansas City → St. Louis.)
5	151	Tampa Bay Buccaneers	Russ Hochstein	G	Nebraska	
5	152	Indianapolis Colts	Raymond Walls	CB	Southern Miss	
5	153	New Orleans Saints	Onome Ojo	WR	UC Davis	
5	154	Washington Redskins	Darnerien McCants	WR	Delaware State	from Denver via St. Louis (Note: No. 154: Denver → St. Louis → Washington. Multiple trades: Denver → St. Louis (PD). Denver traded a fifth-round selection (154th overall) and a 2000 fifth-round selection to St. Louis in exchange for S Billy Jenkins. St. Louis → Washington (D). See Round 5: Washington → St. Louis.)
5	155	Philadelphia Eagles	A. J. Feeley	QB	Oregon	
5	156	Miami Dolphins	Shawn Draper	TE	Alabama	
5	157	Minnesota Vikings	Patrick Chukwurah	LB	Wyoming	
5	158	Oakland Raiders	Ray Perryman	S	Northern Arizona	
5	159	Tennessee Titans	Eddie Berlin	WR	Northern Iowa	
5	160	New York Giants	John Markham	K	Vanderbilt	
5	161	Baltimore Ravens	Chris Barnes	RB	New Mexico State	
5*	162	New York Giants	Jonathan Carter	WR	Troy State	
5*	163	New England Patriots	Hakim Akbar	LB	Washington	
6	164	Miami Dolphins	Brandon Winey	T	LSU	from San Diego (Note: No. 164: San Diego → Miami (PD). San Diego traded a sixth-round selection (164th overall) to Miami in exchange for WR Nate Jacquet.)
6	165	Cleveland Browns	Michael Jameson	CB	Texas A&M	
6	166	Arizona Cardinals	Bobby Newcombe	WR	Nebraska	
6	167	Atlanta Falcons	Randy Garner	DE	Arkansas	
6	168	Cincinnati Bengals	Riall Johnson	LB	Stanford	
6	169	San Francisco 49ers	Cedrick Wilson Sr.	WR	Tennessee	from Chicago (Note: No. 169: Chicago → San Francisco (PD). Chicago traded a sixth-round selection (169th overall) to San Francisco in exchange for CB R. W. McQuarters.)
6	170	Jacksonville Jaguars	Chad Ward	G	Washington	from New England (Note: No. 170: New England → Jacksonville (D). New England traded a sixth-round selection (170th overall) to Jacksonville in exchange for a 2002 fifth-round selection.)
6	171	Dallas Cowboys	Daleroy Stewart	DT	Southern Miss	
6	172	Seattle Seahawks	Josh Booty	QB	LSU	
6	173	Detroit Lions	Jason Glenn	LB	Texas A&M	from San Francisco via New England (Note: No. 173: San Francisco → New England → Detroit. Multiple trades: San Francisco → New England (PD). San Francisco traded a sixth-round selection (173rd overall) to New England in exchange for a 2000 seventh-round selection. New England → Detroit (D). See Round 2: Detroit → New England.)
6	174	Tampa Bay Buccaneers	Jameel Cook	FB	Illinois	
6	175	Carolina Panthers	Dee Brown	RB	Syracuse	
6	176	Kansas City Chiefs	Alex Sulfsted	G	Miami (OH)	
6	177	Miami Dolphins	Josh Heupel	QB	Oklahoma	from Washington (Note: No. 177: Washington → Miami (PD). Washington traded a sixth-round selection (177th overall) to Miami in exchange for DT Barron Tanner.)
6	178	Buffalo Bills	Tony Driver	S	Notre Dame	
6	179	San Francisco 49ers	Rashad Holman	CB	Louisville	from Green Bay (Note: No. 179: Green Bay → San Francisco (PD). See Round 2: San Francisco → Green Bay.)
6	180	New England Patriots	Arther Love	TE	South Carolina State	from Detroit (Note: No. 180: Detroit → New England (D). See Round 5: New England → Detroit.)
6	181	Pittsburgh Steelers	Rodney Bailey	DE	Ohio State	from NY Jets (Note: No. 181: NY Jets → Pittsburgh (D). See Round 1: Pittsburgh → NY Jets.)
6	182	Pittsburgh Steelers	Roger Knight	LB	Wisconsin	
6	183	Tampa Bay Buccaneers	Ellis Wyms	DT	Mississippi State	
6	184	Oakland Raiders	Chris Cooper	DT	Nebraska–Omaha	from Indianapolis (Note: No. 184: Indianapolis → Oakland (PD). Indianapolis traded a sixth-round selection (184th overall) to Oakland in exchange for a 2000 seventh-round selection.)
6	185	New Orleans Saints	Mitch White	T	Oregon State	
6	186	Washington Redskins	Mario Monds	DT	Cincinnati	from St. Louis (Note: No. 186: St. Louis → Washington (D). See Round 5: Washington → St. Louis.)
6	187	Miami Dolphins	Otis Leverette	DE	UAB	from Philadelphia (Note: No. 187 Philadelphia → Miami (D). See Round 3: Philadelphia → Miami.)
6	188	Miami Dolphins	Rick Crowell	LB	Colorado State	
6	189	Minnesota Vikings	Carey Scott	CB	Kentucky State	
6	190	Denver Broncos	Kevin Kasper	WR	Iowa	
6	191	San Francisco 49ers	Menson Holloway	DE	UTEP	from Oakland via Seattle (Note: No. 191: Oakland → Seattle → San Francisco. Multiple trades: Oakland → Seattle (PD). Oakland traded a sixth-round selection (191st overall) to Seattle in exchange for a 2000 seventh-round selection. Seattle → San Francisco (D). See Round 1: Seattle → San Francisco.)
6	192	Tennessee Titans	Dan Alexander	RB	Nebraska	
6	193	Indianapolis Colts	Jason Doering	S	Wisconsin	from NY Giants (Note: No. 193: NY Giants → Indianapolis (D). See Round 1: Indianapolis → NY Giants.)
6	194	Baltimore Ravens	Joe Maese	LS	New Mexico	
6*	195	Buffalo Bills	Dan O'Leary	TE	Notre Dame	
6*	196	Buffalo Bills	Jimmy Williams	CB	Vanderbilt	
6*	197	St. Louis Rams	Francis St. Paul	WR	Northern Arizona	
6*	198	Green Bay Packers	David Martin	TE	Tennessee	
6*	199	Tennessee Titans	Adam Haayer	T	Minnesota	
6*	200	New England Patriots	Leonard Myers	CB	Miami (FL)	
7	201	San Diego Chargers	Brandon Gorin	T	Purdue	
7	202	Arizona Cardinals	Renaldo Hill	CB	Michigan State	
7	203	Cleveland Browns	Paul Zukauskas	G	Boston College	
7	204	Cincinnati Bengals	T. J. Houshmandzadeh ^{†}	WR	Oregon State	
7	205	Tampa Bay Buccaneers	Dauntae' Finger	TE	North Carolina	from Atlanta (Note: No. 205: Atlanta → Tampa Bay (PD). Atlanta traded a seventh-round selection (205th overall) to Tampa Bay in exchange for QB Eric Zeier.)
7	206	New York Jets	James Reed	DT	Iowa State	from New England (Note: No. 206: New England → NY Jets (PD). See Round 4: New England → NY Jets.)
7	207	Dallas Cowboys	Colston Weatherington	DT	Central Missouri State	
7	208	Chicago Bears	John Capel	WR	Florida	from Chicago via Miami (Note: No. 208: Chicago → Miami → Chicago. Multiple trades: Chicago → Miami (PD). Chicago traded a seventh-round selection (208th overall) and a 2000 seventh-round selection to Miami in exchange for P Brent Bartholomew. Miami → Chicago (PD). Miami traded a seventh-round selection (208th overall) to Chicago in exchange for TE Alonzo Mayes.)
7	209	San Francisco 49ers	Alex Lincoln	LB	Auburn	
7	210	Seattle Seahawks	Harold Blackmon	S	Northwestern	
7	211	Carolina Panthers	Louis Williams	C	LSU	
7	212	Kansas City Chiefs	Shaunard Harts	S	Boise State	
7	213	Jacksonville Jaguars	Anthony Denman	LB	Notre Dame	
7	214	Buffalo Bills	Reggie Germany	WR	Ohio State	
7	215	Atlanta Falcons	Corey Hall	S	Appalachian State	from Washington via Denver (Note: No. 215: Washington → Denver → Atlanta. Multiple trades: Washington → Denver (PD). Washington traded a seventh-round selection (215th overall) and a 2000 seventh-round selection to Denver in exchange for CB Tito Paul. Denver → Atlanta (D). Denver traded three seventh-round selections (215th, 219th and 226th overall) to Atlanta in exchange for a 2002 fourth-round selection.)
7	216	New England Patriots	Owen Pochman	K	BYU	from Detroit (Note: No. 216: Detroit → New England (D). See Round 5: New England → Detroit.)
7	217	New York Jets	Tupe Peko	G	Michigan State	
7	218	Pittsburgh Steelers	Chris Taylor	WR	Texas A&M	
7	219	Atlanta Falcons	Kynan Forney	G	Hawaii	from Green Bay via Denver (Note: No. 219: Green Bay → Denver → Atlanta. Multiple trades: Green Bay → Denver (PD). Green Bay traded a seventh-round selection (219th overall) to Denver in exchange for LB David Bowens. (Note: McGinn, Bob (February 24, 2000). "Bowens will be in a rush". Milwaukee Journal Sentinel.) Denver → Atlanta (D). See Round 7: Denver → Atlanta.)
7	220	Indianapolis Colts	Rick DeMulling	G	Idaho	
7	221	New Orleans Saints	Ennis Davis	DT	USC	
7	222	Seattle Seahawks	Dennis Norman	C	Princeton	from St. Louis via Green Bay and San Francisco (Note: No. 222: St. Louis → Green Bay → San Francisco → Seattle. Multiple trades: St. Louis → Green Bay (PD). St. Louis traded a seventh-round selection (222nd overall) to Green Bay in exchange for LB Mike Morton. Green Bay → San Francisco (PD). See Round 2: San Francisco → Green Bay. San Francisco → Seattle (D). See Round 1: Seattle → San Francisco.)
7	223	Tampa Bay Buccaneers	Than Merrill	S	Yale	
7	224	San Francisco 49ers	Eric Johnson	TE	Yale	from Miami via Washington (Note: No. 224: Miami → San Francisco (PD). Miami traded a seventh-round selection (224th overall) to Washington in exchange for P Matt Turk.)
7	225	Minnesota Vikings	Brian Crawford	T	Western Oregon	
7	226	Atlanta Falcons	Ronald Flemons	DE	Texas A&M	from Denver (Note: No. 219: Denver → Atlanta (D). See Round 7: Denver → Atlanta.)
7	227	Carolina Panthers	Mike Roberg	TE	Idaho	from Philadelphia (Note: No. 227: Philadelphia → Carolina (D). Philadelphia traded a seventh-round selection (227th overall) to Carolina in exchange for TE Luther Broughton.)
7	228	Oakland Raiders	Derek Combs	CB	Ohio State	
7	229	Oakland Raiders	Ken-Yon Rambo	WR	Ohio State	from Tennessee (Note: No. 229: Tennessee → Oakland (PD). Tennessee traded a seventh-round selection (229th overall) to Oakland in exchange for G Gennaro DiNapoli.)
7	230	New York Giants	Ross Kolodziej	DT	Wisconsin	
7	231	Baltimore Ravens	Dwayne Missouri	DE	Northwestern	
7*	232	Tennessee Titans	Keith Adams	LB	Clemson	
7*	233	Jacksonville Jaguars	Marlon McCree	S	Kentucky	
7*	234	Tampa Bay Buccaneers	Joe Tafoya	DE	Arizona	
7*	235	Jacksonville Jaguars	Richmond Flowers III	WR	Chattanooga	
7*	236	Atlanta Falcons	Quentin McCord	WR	Kentucky	
7*	237	Seattle Seahawks	Kris Kocurek	DT	Texas Tech	
7*	238	Buffalo Bills	Tyrone Robertson	DT	Georgia	
7*	239	New England Patriots	T. J. Turner	LB	Michigan State	
7*	240	Dallas Cowboys	John Nix	DT	Southern Miss	
7*	241	Jacksonville Jaguars	Randy Chevrier	DT	McGill	
7*	242	Dallas Cowboys	Char-ron Dorsey	T	Florida State	
7*	243	Kansas City Chiefs	Terdell Sands	DT	Chattanooga	
7^	244	San Diego Chargers	Robert Carswell	S	Clemson	
7^	245	Cleveland Browns	Andre King	WR	Miami (FL)	
7^	246	Arizona Cardinals	Tevita Ofahengaue	TE	BYU	

== Trades ==
In the explanations below, (D) denotes trades that took place during the draft, while (PD) indicates trades completed pre-draft.

Round 1

Round 2

Round 3

Round 4

Round 5

Round 6

Round 7

== Players by position ==
The 246 players chosen in the draft were composed of:

Position	Players selected
Quarterback	11
Running back	17
Fullback	2
Wide receiver	34
Tight end	15
Offensive tackle	22
Guard	12
Center	6
Long snapper	1
Defensive end	19
Defensive tackle	27
Linebacker	30
Defensive back	45
Cornerback	21
Safety	23
Kicker	3
Punter	2

== Notable undrafted players ==
†	Pro Bowler

Original NFL team	Player	Pos.	College	Notes
Arizona Cardinals	Andy Bowers	DE	Utah	
Arizona Cardinals	Arnold Jackson	WR	Louisville	
Arizona Cardinals	Nate Poole	WR	Marshall	
Arizona Cardinals	Marcel Shipp	RB	UMass	
Arizona Cardinals	Fred Wakefield	DE	Illinois	
Arizona Cardinals	LeVar Woods	LB	Iowa	
Atlanta Falcons	Matt Allen	P	Troy State	
Baltimore Ravens	Damion Cook	G	Bethune–Cookman	
Baltimore Ravens	J. R. Jenkins	K	Marshall	
Baltimore Ravens	Tim Johnson	LB	Youngstown State	
Buffalo Bills	Tim Hasselbeck	QB	Boston College	
Buffalo Bills	Brian Leigeb	CB	Central Michigan	
Buffalo Bills	Kendrick Office	DE	West Alabama	
Carolina Panthers	Nick Goings	FB	Pittsburgh	
Carolina Panthers	Nathan Hodel	LS	Illinois	
Cincinnati Bengals	Chris Edmonds	FB	West Virginia	
Cincinnati Bengals	Ifeanyi Ohalete	S	USC	
Cleveland Browns	Felipe Claybrooks	DE	Georgia Tech	
Cleveland Browns	Carl Fair	RB	UAB	
Cleveland Browns	Benjamin Gay	RB	Garden City CC	
Dallas Cowboys	Jason Bell	CB	UCLA	
Dallas Cowboys	Javiar Collins	T	Northwestern	
Dallas Cowboys	Demetric Evans	DE	Georgia	
Dallas Cowboys	J. J. Jones	LB	Arkansas	
Dallas Cowboys	Louis Mackey	LB	Akron	
Dallas Cowboys	Lynn Scott	S	Northwestern Oklahoma State	
Dallas Cowboys	Randal Williams	WR	New Hampshire	
Denver Broncos	Phil McGeoghan	WR	Maine	
Detroit Lions	Anthony Herron	DE	Iowa	
Detroit Lions	Chidi Iwuoma	CB	California	
Detroit Lions	Ligarius Jennings	CB	Tennessee State	
Detroit Lions	Stephen Trejo	FB	Arizona State	
Green Bay Packers	Rob Bironas ^{†}	K	Georgia Southern	
Green Bay Packers	Donté Curry	LB	Morris Brown	
Green Bay Packers	Kevin Kaesviharn	S	Augustana (SD)	
Green Bay Packers	Cleo Lemon	QB	Arkansas State	
Green Bay Packers	Marques McFadden	G	Arizona	
Indianapolis Colts	Nick Harper	CB	Fort Valley State	
Indianapolis Colts	Cleveland Pinkney	DT	South Carolina	
Indianapolis Colts	Dominic Rhodes	RB	Midwestern State	
Indianapolis Colts	Marcus Williams	TE/WR	Washington State	
Jacksonville Jaguars	Elvis Joseph	RB	Southern	
Jacksonville Jaguars	Patrick Washington	FB	Virginia	
Jacksonville Jaguars	Ryan Prince	TE	Weber State	
Kansas City Chiefs	Ian Allen	T	Purdue	
Kansas City Chiefs	J. J. Moses	WR	Iowa State	
Kansas City Chiefs	Lawrence Tynes	K	Troy State	
Miami Dolphins	Aaron Elling	K	Wyoming	
Miami Dolphins	Buck Gurley	DT	Florida	
Miami Dolphins	Nick Sorensen	S	Virginia Tech	
Minnesota Vikings	Kenny Clark	WR	UCF	
Minnesota Vikings	Jeff Hazuga	DE	Wisconsin–Stout	
Minnesota Vikings	Brian Russell	S	San Diego State	
Minnesota Vikings	Mike Solwold	LS	Wisconsin	
Minnesota Vikings	Fearon Wright	LB	Rhode Island	
New England Patriots	Stephen Neal	G	Cal State Bakersfield	
New Orleans Saints	Tim Carter	CB	Tulane	
New Orleans Saints	Derek Dorris	WR	Texas Tech	
New Orleans Saints	James Fenderson	RB	Hawaii	
New Orleans Saints	Boo Williams	TE	Arkansas	
New York Giants	Delvin Joyce	RB/KR	James Madison	
New York Giants	Lance Legree	DT	Notre Dame	
New York Giants	Brady McDonnell	TE	Colorado	
New York Giants	Clarence LeBlanc	S	LSU	
New York Giants	Marcellus Rivers	TE	Oklahoma State	
New York Giants	Rich Seubert	G	Western Illinois	
New York Giants	Josh Stamer	LB	South Dakota	
New York Giants	Josh Warner	C/G	Brockport	
New York Jets	Reggie White	RB	Oklahoma State	
New York Jets	Daniel Wilcox	TE	Appalachian State	
New York Jets	Tory Woodbury	QB	Winston-Salem State	
Philadelphia Eagles	Jason Baker	P	Iowa	
Philadelphia Eagles	Josh Parry	FB	San Jose State	
Philadelphia Eagles	Jason Short	LB	Eastern Michigan	
Pittsburgh Steelers	Tim Baker	WR	Texas Tech	
Pittsburgh Steelers	R. J. Bowers	FB	Grove City	
Pittsburgh Steelers	Chris Hoke	DT	BYU	
Pittsburgh Steelers	Justin Kurpeikis	LB	Penn State	
Pittsburgh Steelers	Keydrick Vincent	G	Ole Miss	
San Diego Chargers	Walter Bernard	CB	New Mexico	
San Diego Chargers	Dondre Gilliam	WR	Millersville	
San Diego Chargers	Michael Keathley	G	TCU	
San Diego Chargers	Terry Witherspoon	FB	Clemson	
San Francisco 49ers	Tom Ashworth	T	Colorado	
San Francisco 49ers	Antonio Chatman	WR	Cincinnati	
San Francisco 49ers	Steve Cheek	P	Humboldt State	
San Francisco 49ers	Gabe Crecion	TE	UCLA	
San Francisco 49ers	Jimmy Farris	WR	Montana	
San Francisco 49ers	Jasen Isom	FB	Western Illinois	
San Francisco 49ers	James Jordan	WR	Louisiana Tech	
San Francisco 49ers	Jamal Robertson	RB/KR	Ohio Northern	
San Francisco 49ers	Ben Steele	TE	Mesa State	
St. Louis Rams	Aveion Cason	RB	Illinois State	
St. Louis Rams	Troy Evans	LB	Cincinnati	
St. Louis Rams	James Whitley	CB	Michigan	
Tampa Bay Buccaneers	Ryan Benjamin	LS	South Florida	
Tampa Bay Buccaneers	Marq Cerqua	LB	Carson–Newman	
Tennessee Titans	Drew Bennett	WR	UCLA	
Tennessee Titans	Wes Ours	RB	West Virginia	
Tennessee Titans	Juqua Parker	DE	Oklahoma State	
Tennessee Titans	Joe Walker	S	Nebraska	
Washington Redskins	David Brandt	C/G	Michigan	
Washington Redskins	Donny Green	LB	Virginia	
Washington Redskins	Antonio Pierce ^{†}	LB	Arizona	
Washington Redskins	Terrance Simmons	DT	Alabama State	
Washington Redskins	Justin Skaggs	WR	Evangel	
Washington Redskins	Ross Tucker	G	Princeton	
Washington Redskins	Kenny Watson	RB	Penn State	

== Hall of Famers ==
- LaDainian Tomlinson, running back from TCU, taken 1st round 5th overall by the San Diego Chargers.

Inducted: Professional Football Hall of Fame Class of 2017.

- Steve Hutchinson, guard from Michigan, taken 1st round 17th overall by the Seattle Seahawks.

Inducted: Professional Football Hall of Fame Class of 2020.

- Richard Seymour, defensive tackle from Georgia, taken 1st round 6th overall by the New England Patriots.

Inducted: Professional Football Hall of Fame Class of 2022.

- Drew Brees, quarterback from Purdue, taken 2nd round 32nd overall by the San Diego Chargers.

Inducted: Professional Football Hall of Fame Class of 2026.
