= Ofahengaue =

Ofahengaue is a surname. Notable people with the surname include:

- Joe Ofahengaue (born 1995), New Zealand-Australian rugby league footballer
- Tevita Ofahengaue (born 1974), American football player
- Viliami Ofahengaue (born 1968), Tongan-born Australian rugby union player
