= Clay Timpner =

American baseball player (born 1983)

- Left fielder
- Born: May 13, 1983 (age 43); Lakeland, Florida, U.S.
- Batted: Left Threw: Left

MLB debut
- April 8, 2008, for the San Francisco Giants

Last MLB appearance
- April 11, 2008, for the San Francisco Giants

MLB statistics
- Batting average: .000
- Home runs: 0
- Runs batted in: 0
- Stats at Baseball Reference

Teams
- San Francisco Giants (2008)

Clay William Timpner (born May 13, 1983) is an American former Major League Baseball outfielder with the San Francisco Giants.

== Amateur career ==
A native of Lakeland, Florida, Timpner attended LaBelle High School, where he hit .448 with 75 stolen bases and also a 2.39 ERA during his tenure there. He was selected by the Texas Rangers in the 41st round of the 2001 MLB draft, but opted to play college baseball at the University of Central Florida. In 2003, he played collegiate summer baseball with the Cotuit Kettleers of the Cape Cod Baseball League. At UCF, Timpner was an Atlantic Sun Conference all-star, stealing 43 bases in 65 games in 2004. Timpner was selected by San Francisco in the fourth round of the 2004 MLB draft, and signed with the club.

== Professional career ==
He started his professional career off in 2004, where - between time spent with the Salem-Keizer Volcanoes and San Jose Giants - he played in 74 games, collecting 93 hits in 319 at bats for a .292 batting average. He stole 17 bases in 22 chances for a 77% success rate.

2005 was another good year for Timpner. In 126 games with the San Jose Giants, he hit 22 doubles, 12 triples and four home runs en route to a .291 batting average. He also stole a career high 34 bases.

In 2006, he split time between the Connecticut Defenders and Fresno Grizzlies. Combined, he hit only .253 in 128 games, stealing a then-career low 16 bases.

He spent all of 2007 with the Grizzlies. He hit a career high .301 with a career-low nine stolen bases.

Timpner began the 2008 season with the Grizzlies, but he soon received a call up on April 8 when Dave Roberts was placed on the disabled list. Timpner made his major league debut on that same day against the San Diego Padres, appearing in the game as a pinch hitter and striking out. He was later sent down for Giants corner outfielder and first baseman, John Bowker. He hit .245/.301/.323 in the minors that year.

In 2009, with Fresno, Timpner hit .250/.309/.375 with seven home runs and 42 RBI. With the Richmond Flying Squirrels in 2010, he hit .290/.346/.372 with four home runs and 51 RBI. He moved to the Detroit Tigers system for 2011, where he hit .111/.226/.111 in 27 at-bats for the Triple-A Toledo Mud Hens.

Overall, he hit .273/.323/.367 in 812 minor league games.
