= Fred Wakefield =

American football player (born 1978)

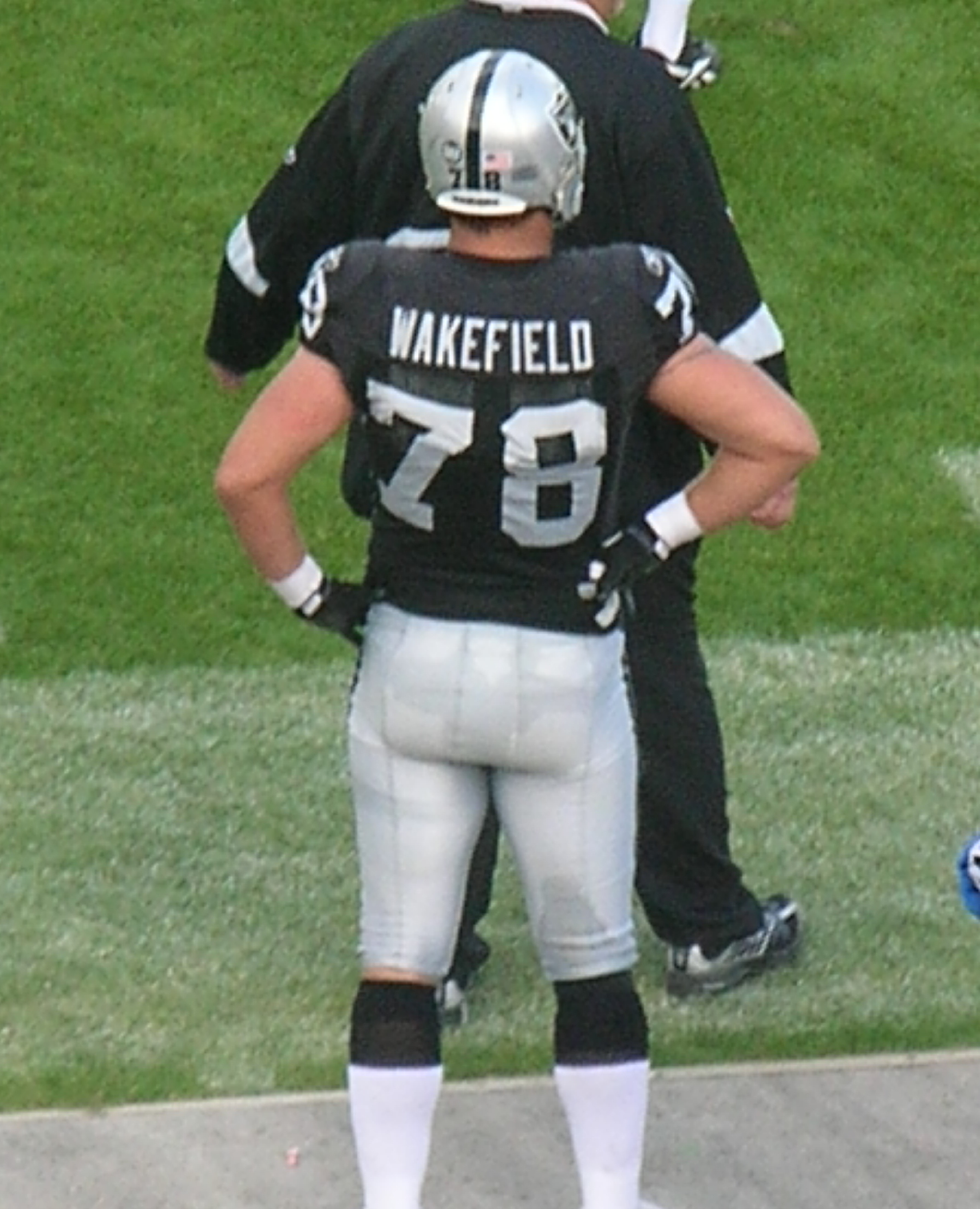
- Wakefield in November 2008

No. 97, 78, 87
- Position: Defensive end

Personal information
- Born: September 17, 1978 (age 48); Tuscola, Illinois, U.S.
- Listed height: 6 ft 7 in (2.01 m)
- Listed weight: 295 lb (134 kg)

Career information
- College: Illinois (2000)
- NFL draft: 2001: undrafted

Career history
- Arizona Cardinals (2001–2006); Oakland Raiders (2007–2008)

Awards and highlights
- First-team All-Big Ten (2000)

Career NFL statistics
- Total tackles: 96
- Sacks: 6.5
- Fumble recoveries: 2
- Pass deflections: 14
- Interceptions: 1
- Defensive touchdowns: 1
- Stats at Pro Football Reference

Frederick Douglas Wakefield (born September 17, 1978) is an American former professional football player who was an offensive tackle and guard on offense and a defensive end on defense. He played college football for the Illinois Fighting Illini and was signed by the Arizona Cardinals as an undrafted free agent in 2001. Wakefield has also played for the Oakland Raiders.

== NFL career statistics ==
Legend
**Bold**	Career high

Year	Team	Games		Tackles					Interceptions					Fumbles			
Year	Team	GP	GS	Cmb	Solo	Ast	Sck	TFL	Int	Yds	TD	Lng	PD	FF	FR	Yds	TD
2001	ARI	**16**	12	**34**	**28**	6	2.5	**6**	**1**	**20**	**1**	**20**	**9**	0	0	0	0
2002	ARI	**16**	**14**	32	22	**10**	**3.0**	5	0	0	0	0	3	0	0	0	0
2003	ARI	10	5	24	21	3	1.0	4	0	0	0	0	1	**1**	**1**	0	0
2005	ARI	15	9	0	0	0	0.0	0	0	0	0	0	0	0	0	0	0
2006	ARI	**16**	9	1	1	0	0.0	0	0	0	0	0	0	0	**1**	0	0
2008	OAK	7	0	5	2	3	0.0	0	0	0	0	0	1	0	0	0	0
		80	49	96	74	22	6.5	15	1	20	1	20	14	1	2	0	0
