= Marcus Bell (lineman) =

American football player (born 1979)

No. 94
- Position: Defensive tackle

Personal information
- Born: June 1, 1979 (age 47); Memphis, Tennessee, U.S.
- Listed height: 6 ft 2 in (1.88 m)
- Listed weight: 325 lb (147 kg)

Career information
- High school: Kingsbury (Memphis)
- College: Memphis
- NFL draft: 2001: 3rd round, 28th overall pick

Career history
- Arizona Cardinals (2001–2003); Detroit Lions (2004–2006); New York Giants (2007)

Career NFL statistics
- Total tackles: 187
- Sacks: 6.5
- Forced fumbles: 3
- Fumble recoveries: 1
- Stats at Pro Football Reference

Marcus L. Bell (born June 1, 1979) is an American former professional football player who was a defensive lineman in the National Football League (NFL). He has previously played for the Arizona Cardinals, the Detroit Lions, and the New York Giants.

== College career ==
Bell played college football at the University of Memphis whose presence in the starting lineup brought an instant improvement for the defensive unit despite starting just 20 games. He finished career with 34 tackles behind the line of scrimmage and 10 sacks at nose guard. 209 total tackles in 42 games as a Tiger. Was anchor of the nation's top-rated rushing defense as a senior in 2000. He was one of five Tiger defenders to earn first-team all-Conference USA honors, tying league record. Natural hunter finishing fifth on the team with 60 total tackles (47 solos) also recorded four sacks for –36 yards and a team-high 16 stops for losses of 61 yards, 16 tackles behind the line of scrimmage rank fifth on the Memphis single-season list.

== Professional career ==
Pre-draft measurables
| Height | Weight | Arm length | Hand span | 40-yard dash | 10-yard split | 20-yard split | 20-yard shuttle | Three-cone drill | Broad jump | Bench press |
|---|---|---|---|---|---|---|---|---|---|---|
| 6 ft 1 1/2 in (1.87 m) | 319 lb (145 kg) | 32 1/2 in (0.83 m) | 10 in (0.25 m) | 5.28 s | 1.81 s | 3.04 s | 4.71 s | 8.07 s | 8 ft 2 in (2.49 m) | 17 reps |
All values from Pro Day

Bell was selected by the Arizona Cardinals in the 2001 NFL draft, and played for the Cardinals during the 2001, 2002, 2003 and 2004 seasons. He was released by the Detroit Lions on March 2, 2007. On April 13, 2007, he signed with the Giants, but was placed on injured reserve on August 28.

In 2009 Marcus joined the Memphis Tiger Athletic staff, as a member of the strength and conditioning program.

== NFL career statistics ==
Legend
| **Bold** | Career high |

| Year | Team | Games | | Tackles | | | | | Interceptions | | | | | Fumbles | | | |
| Year | Team | GP | GS | Cmb | Solo | Ast | Sck | TFL | Int | Yds | TD | Lng | PD | FF | FR | Yds | TD |
|---|---|---|---|---|---|---|---|---|---|---|---|---|---|---|---|---|---|
| 2001 | ARI | 13 | 0 | 27 | 19 | 8 | 0.5 | 2 | 0 | 0 | 0 | 0 | **2** | 0 | 0 | 0 | 0 |
| 2002 | ARI | **16** | 4 | 38 | **27** | 11 | **2.0** | **4** | 0 | 0 | 0 | 0 | **2** | 0 | 0 | 0 | 0 |
| 2003 | ARI | 13 | **10** | 23 | 21 | 2 | 1.0 | **4** | 0 | 0 | 0 | 0 | 1 | 0 | 0 | 0 | 0 |
| 2004 | DET | **16** | 0 | 27 | 19 | 8 | **2.0** | 2 | 0 | 0 | 0 | 0 | 1 | **1** | 0 | 0 | 0 |
| 2005 | DET | 15 | 0 | 32 | 22 | 10 | 0.0 | 1 | 0 | 0 | 0 | 0 | 0 | **1** | 0 | 0 | 0 |
| 2006 | DET | 13 | 7 | **40** | 23 | **17** | 1.0 | 3 | 0 | 0 | 0 | 0 | 0 | **1** | **1** | 0 | 0 |
| | | 86 | 21 | 187 | 131 | 56 | 6.5 | 16 | 0 | 0 | 0 | 0 | 6 | 3 | 1 | 0 | 0 |
