= LaBelle High School =

Coordinates: 26.7475661°N 81.440076°W

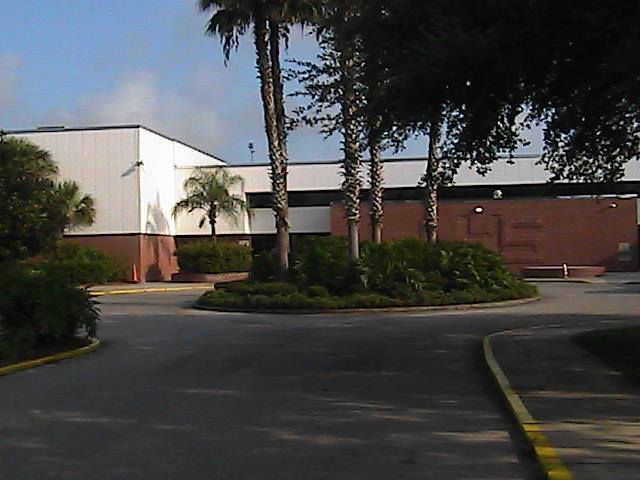

Location
- 4050 E Cowboy Way; LaBelle, Florida 33935

Information
- Type: Public school
- Established: 1915
- Principal: Tammy Bass
- Teaching staff: 49.00 (FTE)
- Grades: 9–12
- Enrollment: 1,451 (2022-23)
- Student to teacher ratio: 29.61
- Colors: Red and white
- Mascot: Cowboy & Cowgirl
- Website: LaBelle High School

LaBelle High School is a high school located in LaBelle, Florida. It is operated by the Hendry County Schools District. The school was founded in 1915 and has been accredited since 1921. A new, larger school was finished in 1979 in its current place. Edward A. Upthegrove Elementary is in the place on the old high school, which is located in downtown LaBelle. During the 2008-2009 school year the school total enrollment was 1,568 students. The high school is the only one that serves students in the city and surrounding areas of LaBelle. For many years, LaBelle High School was a branch campus for Edison State College, which held night classes at the school.

== Athletics ==
A variety of sports are played at LaBelle High School including football (fall, boys), Cheerleading (fall), cross-country (fall, boys and girls), golf, volleyball (fall, girls), soccer (winter, boys and girls), basketball (winter, boys and girls), wrestling (winter), weightlifting (winter, girls), softball (spring, girls), baseball (spring, boys), track (spring), tennis (spring), powerlifting (spring, boys).

== Notable alumni ==
- Bill Gramatica, former NFL player
- Martin Gramatica, former NFL player
- Clay Timpner, former MLB player
