= Otis Leverette =

American football player (born 1978)

No. 93
- Position: Defensive end

Personal information
- Born: May 31, 1978 (age 48); Americus, Georgia, U.S.
- Listed height: 6 ft 6 in (1.98 m)
- Listed weight: 278 lb (126 kg)

Career information
- College: UAB
- NFL draft: 2001: 6th round, 187th overall pick

Career history
- Miami Dolphins (2001)*; Washington Redskins (2001–2002); San Diego Chargers (2002–2003); San Francisco 49ers (2004); Seattle Seahawks (2004–2005)*; Tennessee Titans (2005)*; Carolina Panthers (2005–2006)*
- * Offseason or practice squad member only

Career NFL statistics
- Tackles: 31
- Sacks: 2
- Interceptions: 1
- Stats at Pro Football Reference

Otis Catrell Leverette (born May 31, 1978) is an American former professional football player who was a defensive end in the National Football League (NFL) for the Washington Redskins, San Diego Chargers, and the San Francisco 49ers. He played college football for the UAB Blazers.

== Early life ==
Leverette attended Americus High School in Americus, Georgia and participated in football, basketball, wrestling, baseball, and track and field. In football, he was a three-year letterman and as a senior, he was named the Regional Defensive Player of the Year.

== College career ==
Leverette attended Middle Georgia College and was a letterman in football. In football, he was a two-year starter and as a sophomore, he was a JUCO All-America selection.

== Professional career ==
=== Miami Dolphins ===
Leverette was selected by the Miami Dolphins in the sixth round, with the 187th overall pick, of the 2001 NFL draft. He officially signed with the team on July 12. He was waived on September 2, 2001.

=== Washington Redskins ===
Leverette was claimed off waivers by the Washington Redskins on September 3, 2001. He played in four games for the Redskins during the 2001 season, recording one inteception and one pass breakup. He appeared in one game in 2002 and made one solo tackle. He was waived by the Redskins on November 18, 2002.

=== San Diego Chargers ===
Leverette was claimed off waivers by the San Diego Chargers on November 19, 2002. He did not play in any games for the Chargers in 2002, but played in seven games in 2003, totaling 17 solo tackles, six assisted tackles, and sack. He was waived on September 5, 2004.

=== San Francisco 49ers ===
Leverette was claimed off waivers by the San Francisco 49ers on September 6, 2004. He played in five games, starting one, for the 49ers in 2004, recording seven solo tackles and one sack. He was waived on November 9, 2004.

=== Seattle Seahawks ===
Leverette was signed to the practice squad of the Seattle Seahawks on November 12, 2004. He signed a reserve/future contract with the Seahawks on January 31, 2005. He was released on August 29, 2005.

=== Tennessee Titans ===
Leverette was signed to the Tennessee Titans' practice squad on September 5, 2005.

=== Carolina Panthers ===
On January 18, 2006, during the postseason, Leverette was signed to the practice squad of the Carolina Panthers. He re-signed with the Panthers on March 1, 2006. He was released on July 29, 2006.
