= Bill Gramatica =

Argentine gridiron football player (born 1978)

No. 7, 11, 10
- Position: Kicker

Personal information
- Born: 10 July 1978 (age 48); Buenos Aires, Argentina
- Listed height: 5 ft 10 in (1.78 m)
- Listed weight: 192 lb (87 kg)

Career information
- High school: LaBelle (LaBelle, Florida, U.S.)
- College: Florida State (1996–1997); South Florida (1998–2000)
- NFL draft: 2001: 4th round, 98th overall pick

Career history
- Arizona Cardinals (2001–2003); New York Giants (2004)*; Miami Dolphins (2004); Tampa Bay Storm (2006–2007)
- * Offseason or practice squad member only

Awards and highlights
- Second-team Division I-AA All-American (1998); Division I-AA All-Independent (1998); Blue–Gray Football Classic Offensive MVP (2001); FCS record: Longest field goal made: 63 yards (tied) (Note: The Bulls competed in the FCS (then known as Division I-AA) from 1997 to 2000, the record was set in 2000, so it is an FCS record)

Career NFL statistics
- Field goals attempted: 48
- Field goals made: 37
- Field goals percentage: 77.1%
- Extra points attempted: 61
- Extra points made: 60
- Extra points percentage: 98.4%
- Longest field goal: 50
- Stats at Pro Football Reference

Career AFL statistics
- Field goals attempted: 33
- Field goals made: 13
- Field goals percentage: 39.4%
- Stats at ArenaFan.com

Guillermo C. "Bill" Gramatica (born 10 July 1978) is a former American football placekicker in the National Football League (NFL) for the Arizona Cardinals and Miami Dolphins. He also was a member of the Tampa Bay Storm in the Arena Football League (AFL). He was drafted by the Cardinals in the fourth round of the 2001 NFL draft. He played college football at the University of South Florida. Gramatica is perhaps best known for tearing a knee ligament in a celebratory leap in 2001.

== Early life ==
Gramatica was born in Buenos Aires, Argentina, to Laura and William Gramática. Bill is the younger brother to fellow placekicker Martin Gramatica and older brother to Santiago Gramatica. Laura and William Gramática decided to move their family from Argentina to LaBelle, Florida, in 1983. Bill graduated from LaBelle High School, as did his two brothers.

“As a kid in Argentina, the first thing you get is a soccer ball and a jersey, and you play ALL the time, you love it so much, it’s a passion. My brother, Martin, was like a father to us; he gave up his childhood for us. I decided to pursue college football instead of soccer because of him. I wanted to be successful, and I wanted to follow in my brother’s footsteps and not disappoint him.”

— Bill Gramatica on what motivated him to pursue an NFL career

As a senior in 1995, he made 15-of-20 field goals and 44-of-45 extra points, tying a school record with a 52-yard field goal. He received first-team Class 3A All-State and honorable-mention USA Today All-American honors.

== College career ==
Gramatica accepted a football scholarship from Florida State University. He was redshirted, while senior Scott Bentley finished his college eligibility. As a redshirt freshman in 1997, he competed with true freshman Sebastian Janikowski for the starting placekicker job. He began the first 4 games of the season as the starter, showing inconsistency by making 2-of-4 (50%) on field goals and 10-of-12 (83%) on extra points. He was passed on the depth chart by Janikowski, asked head coach Bobby Bowden to be released from his scholarship and left school.

On 7 October 1997, he announced that he was transferring to Division I-AA University of South Florida. As a sophomore in 1998, he set school records with 16-of-24 field goals made (66%), 46-of-47 extra points made (97%) and 94 scored points. He received second-team Division I-AA All-American honors.

As a junior in 1999, he was limited with a groin injury and posted 4-of-5 field goals (80%). Tony Umholz replaced him in the games he missed.

As a senior in 2000, he made 16-of-24 field goal attempts (66.7%), 29-of-30 extra points (96.7%), 77 scored points and 6 punts with a 33.7-yard average. In the season finale against Austin Peay State University, he set a school record and tied a Division I-AA record with a 63-yard field goal. In 2001, after his graduation, he was replaced with his younger brother Santiago, who became a four-year starter and made 38 field goals.

Gramatica finished his college career after setting most of the kicking records at the University of South Florida, among them, 36 career field goals, 67.9% career field goal accuracy, 85 career extra points, 193 career points, longest field goal (63 yards), 8 consecutive field goals made and 45 consecutive extra points made. On 22 July 2016, he was named to the school's all-time team.

== Professional career ==
=== Arizona Cardinals ===
Gramatica was selected by the Arizona Cardinals in the fourth round (98th overall) of the 2001 NFL draft. As a rookie, he passed Cary Blanchard on the depth chart and his NFL career began with promising results. On 15 December, in the thirteenth game against the New York Giants, he injured himself, after jumping up in celebration of a 42-yard made field goal and tearing his right ACL upon landing. Even though he was seriously injured, he still kicked one field goal and 2 extra points, while Pat Tillman did the kickoffs. On 18 December, he was placed on the injured reserve list. He was replaced with Cedric Oglesby. He finished the season with 16-of-20 field goals (80%) and 25-of-25 extra points (100%). He made 4 field goals in one game against the Oakland Raiders. He set a franchise rookie record with 73 points scored.

In 2002, he regained his starting job, registering 15-of-21 field goals (71.4%) and 29-of-29 extra points (100%).

In 2003, he made 3-of-4 field goals (75%) and 6-of-6 extra points (100%). On 19 November, he was placed on the injured reserve list with a back injury. He was replaced with Tim Duncan. He was not re-signed after the season.

=== New York Giants ===
On 14 May 2004, he was signed as a free agent by the New York Giants, to compete for the starting job against Matt Bryant. He was passed on the depth chart by Steve Christie and was released on 31 August.

=== Miami Dolphins ===
On 6 November 2004, he was signed as a free agent by the Miami Dolphins, to replace an injured Olindo Mare. He played in one game and was cut from the team on 10 November, after making 3-of-3 field goals, but also missing his first career extra point kick, which came in a one-point loss (23–24) against his former team the Arizona Cardinals.

Gramatica finished his professional career posting 37-of-48 field goals (77.1%) and 60-of-61 extra point (98.4%) attempts.

=== Tampa Bay Storm (AFL) ===
On 19 October 2005, he was signed by the Tampa Bay Storm of the Arena Football League, after being out of football. In 2006, he made 12-of-30 field goal attempts (seventh in the league) and 94-of-108 extra points attempts (eight in the league). He was waived on 6 March 2007.

== NFL career statistics ==
=== Regular season ===
Year	Team	GP	Overall FGs				PATs			Kickoffs		Points
Year	Team	GP	Lng	FGA	FGM	Pct	XPA	XPM	Pct	KO	TB	Points
2001	ARI	13	50	20	16	80.0	25	25	100.0	51	8	73
2002	ARI	16	50	21	15	71.4	29	29	100.0	60	0	74
2003	ARI	4	38	4	3	75.0	6	6	100.0	14	0	15
2004	MIA	1	30	3	3	100.0	1	0	0.0	6	1	9
Career		34	50	48	37	77.1	61	60	98.4	131	9	171

== Personal life ==
During his time with the New Orleans Saints, Martin Gramatica witnessed the devastation Hurricane Katrina left and wanted to give back once his career came to an end. Together, Martin and Bill searched for a product to build houses out of that could withstand the forces of a hurricane; joined by their brother Santiago Gramatica, who also played as a kicker for the USF Bulls football team, the Gramatica family founded SIPS International in 2009, providing a full line of services involving Structural Insulated Panel Systems (SIPS). Such panels provide an environmentally friendly protection against extreme weather conditions like hurricanes, earthquakes, and other hazardous weather. The family has built resistant, affordable houses in cities like New Orleans and Tampa, along with countries like Israel, Argentina, and Haiti. "It's really been rewarding to help out," Bill stated in an article for AZCentral.com. "We're doing our best to find people to donate one building, one school, one village. There is no better feeling than knowing you've made a positive impact in someone's life. It is our responsibility and privilege to help provide a safer, more energy efficient product that will reduce the cost of ownership."

While in the Tampa Bay area, the Gramatica brothers saw the need to support members of their community, especially combat wounded veterans. Through partnerships with other organizations, they raise awareness and support bay area veterans returning from combat duty that may face health and financial challenges. In order to assist a greater number of local residents, the Gramaticas have founded the Gramatica Family Foundation; a non-profit whose mission is to provide energy efficient housing initiatives and development assistance to disabled military veterans, the underprivileged, and the ailing.

He is also one of the premier realtors in the Tampa area.
