= Cedric Oglesby =

American football player (b. 1977)

No. 1
- Position: Placekicker

Personal information
- Born: July 26, 1977 (age 49); Decatur, Georgia, U.S.
- Listed height: 5 ft 11 in (1.80 m)
- Listed weight: 175 lb (79 kg)

Career information
- High school: Southwest DeKalb (DeKalb County, Georgia)
- College: South Carolina State
- NFL draft: 2000: undrafted

Career history
- Dallas Cowboys (2000)*; San Diego Chargers (2001)*; Arizona Cardinals (2001)
- * Offseason or practice squad member only

Awards and highlights
- First-team All-MEAC (1997); Second-team All-MEAC (1996)

Career NFL statistics
- Games played: 3
- Field goal attempts: 6
- Field goals made: 5
- Stats at Pro Football Reference

Cedric Oglesby (born July 26, 1977) is an American former professional football player who was a placekicker for one season in the National Football League (NFL) for the Arizona Cardinals. He played college football for the South Carolina State Bulldogs and also had stints in the NFL with the Dallas Cowboys and San Diego Chargers. He was one of the first African-American kickers in the NFL.

== Early life and education ==
Oglesby was born on July 26, 1977, in Decatur, Georgia. He grew up in Stone Mountain and attended Southwest DeKalb High School, where he played football and soccer. After graduating from Southwest DeKalb, Oglesby was convinced by coach Buck Godfrey to attend South Carolina State University. In his first year at the school, he was named second-team All-Mid-Eastern Athletic Conference while playing both placekicker and punter for the South Carolina State Bulldogs.

Oglesby earned his second consecutive all-conference selection as a sophomore in 1997, being named first-team All-MEAC as a punter after recording 69 punts averaging 39.3 yards each. He also went 8-of-13 on field goals and converted all but three of his 31 extra point attempts. He finished with a team-leading 52 total points in 11 games. In the annual McDonald's Heritage Bowl, a loss against the Southern Jaguars, Oglesby tied the bowl game's record for best punt average, recording 43.6 yards per punt on seven attempts.

Oglesby's head coach, Willie Jeffries, described him as "just a good athlete. He can do a two-step punt, a one-step punt and a no-step punt." In the 1998 season, Oglesby set the school record for most field goals made, with 11, and also broke the team record for longest field goal, successfully attempting a 52-yarder. He spent his final season at South Carolina State in 1999.

== Professional career ==
After going unselected in the 2000 NFL draft, Oglesby was signed by the Dallas Cowboys as an undrafted free agent. He was released on April 30. The following year, he spent time with the San Diego Chargers, but was not able to make the final roster, despite making all of his field goal attempts in preseason, including a game-winning 33-yarder against the Miami Dolphins in overtime.

While a free agent in 2001, Oglesby worked as a substitute teacher. He was practicing kicking in December, near the end of the NFL season, when he got a call from the Arizona Cardinals. The Cardinals' previous kicker, Bill Gramatica, had injured himself celebrating, and so Oglesby was signed as a replacement for the final three games of the season, beating Vitaly Pisetsky for the job. He made his NFL debut in week 15 against the Dallas Cowboys, making a 34-yard field goal and two extra points, but missing a 35-yard attempt. It made him one of the first African-American kickers in league history. Oglesby performed better in his second match, making all three of his field goal attempts, each of his three extra points, and a tackle in the 30–7 win over the Carolina Panthers. He played his final game against the Washington Redskins in week 17, making two field goals and two extra points in the 17–20 loss. He became a free agent after the season and did not sign another NFL contract.

== Personal life ==
Oglesby became a Christian while at South Carolina State. He operated a kicking camp after his playing career. In 2008, he was named to ESPN's all-time black college football team.
