= Tywan Mitchell =

American football player (born 1975)

No. 83
- Position: Wide receiver

Personal information
- Born: December 10, 1975 (age 50); Crete, Illinois, U.S.
- Listed height: 6 ft 5 in (1.96 m)
- Listed weight: 245 lb (111 kg)

Career information
- High school: Crete-Monee
- College: Mankato State
- NFL draft: 1999: undrafted

Career history
- Baltimore Ravens (1999)*; Arizona Cardinals (1999–2001); Detroit Lions (2003)*; Calgary Stampeders (2005)
- * Offseason or practice squad member only

Career NFL statistics
- Games played: 26
- Receptions: 30
- Receiving Yards: 276
- Receiving TDs: 2
- Stats at Pro Football Reference

Tywan M. Mitchell (born December 10, 1975) is an American former professional football player who was a wide receiver with the Arizona Cardinals of the National Football League (NFL). He played college football for the Mankato State Mavericks.
