= Andy Bowers (American football) =

American football player (born 1976)

No. 71
- Position: Defensive end

Personal information
- Born: February 22, 1976 (age 50); Salt Lake City, Utah, U.S.
- Listed height: 6 ft 5 in (1.96 m)
- Listed weight: 283 lb (128 kg)

Career information
- High school: Hillcrest (Midvale, Utah)
- College: Utah (1997–2000)
- NFL draft: 2001: undrafted

Career history
- Arizona Cardinals (2001–2002); Buffalo Bills (2003)*; Arizona Rattlers (2004)*
- * Offseason or practice squad member only
- Stats at Pro Football Reference

Andrew Wyatt Wayne Bowers (born February 22, 1976) is an American former professional football player who was a defensive end for one season with the Arizona Cardinals of the National Football League (NFL). He played college football for the Utah Utes.

== Early life and college ==
Andrew Wyant Wayne Bowers was born on February 22, 1976, in Salt Lake City, Utah. He played high school football at Hillcrest High School in Midvale, Utah as a defensive end, earning first-team All-Region and second-team All-State honors. He was also a football team captain and a two-year letterman in basketball.

Bowers spent three years on an LDS Church mission in Denmark before playing college football for the Utah Utes of the University of Utah. He was a four-year letterman for the Utes from 1997 to 2000.

== Professional career ==
After going undrafted in the 2001 NFL draft, Bowers signed with the Arizona Cardinals on April 23, 2001. He was released on September 2, signed to the practice squad on September 3, promoted to the active roster on October 25, released again on November 6, signed to the practice squad again on November 7, and promoted to the active roster again on November 30, 2001. Overall, he played in, and started, one game for the Cardinals during the 2001 season; the November 4 loss to the Philadelphia Eagles. Bowers posted one assisted tackle during the game. He was placed on injured reserve the next year on September 5, 2002, and was released on November 12, 2002.

Bowers was signed by the Buffalo Bills on February 4, 2003. He was later released on July 14, 2003.

Bowers was signed to the practice squad of the Arizona Rattlers of the Arena Football League on June 16, 2004. He re-signed with the Rattlers on October 22, 2004, but was later waived on January 21, 2005.
