= Terry Hardy =

American football player (born 1976)

No. 80
- Position: Tight end

Personal information
- Born: May 31, 1976 (age 50); Montgomery, Alabama, U.S.
- Listed height: 6 ft 4 in (1.93 m)
- Listed weight: 271 lb (123 kg)

Career information
- High school: Carver (Montgomery)
- College: Southern Mississippi
- NFL draft: 1998: 5th round, 125th overall pick

Career history
- Arizona Cardinals (1998–2001)

Career NFL statistics
- Receptions: 68
- Receiving yards: 461
- Receiving touchdowns: 3
- Stats at Pro Football Reference

Terry R. Hardy (born May 31, 1976) is an American former professional football player who was a tight end for four seasons with the Arizona Cardinals of the National Football League (NFL). He played college football for the Southern Miss Golden Eagles before being selected 125th overall by the Cardinals in the fifth round of the 1998 NFL draft.
