= Michael Stone (American football) =

American football player (born 1978)

No. 44, 24, 42
- Position: Safety

Personal information
- Born: February 13, 1978 (age 48); Southfield, Michigan, U.S.
- Listed height: 6 ft 0 in (1.83 m)
- Listed weight: 207 lb (94 kg)

Career information
- High school: Southfield-Lathrup (Southfield)
- College: Memphis
- NFL draft: 2001: 2nd round, 54th overall pick

Career history
- Arizona Cardinals (2001–2004); St. Louis Rams (2005)*; New England Patriots (2005); Houston Texans (2006); New York Giants (2007)
- * Offseason or practice squad member only

Career NFL statistics
- Games played: 52
- Total tackles: 76
- Stats at Pro Football Reference

Michael Ahmed Stone (born February 13, 1978) is an American former professional football player who was a safety in the National Football League (NFL). He played college football at Memphis Tigers and was selected by the Arizona Cardinals in the second round (54th overall) of the 2001 NFL draft.

== Early life ==
Stone attended Southfield-Lathrup High School in Southfield, Michigan, where he lettered in football and track.

== College career ==
Stone graduated with honors from the University of Memphis with a degree in architecture.
