= Tevita Ofahengaue =

Tongan gridiron football player (born 1974)

Profile
- Position: Tight end

Personal information
- Born: 9 July 1974 (age 52); Tongatapu, Tonga
- Listed height: 6 ft 2 in (1.88 m)
- Listed weight: 265 lb (120 kg)

Career information
- High school: Kahuku (Kahuku, Hawaii, U.S.)
- College: BYU
- NFL draft: 2001: 7th round, 246th overall pick

Career history
- Arizona Cardinals (2001)*; Jacksonville Jaguars (2002)*
- * Offseason or practice squad member only

Awards and highlights
- Second-team All-MW (2000)

Tevita Lotoatau Ofahengaue (born 9 July 1974) is a former American football tight end. He was the last (246th) pick in the 2001 NFL draft, thus qualifying as that year's "Mr. Irrelevant". He was drafted out of Brigham Young University by the Arizona Cardinals.

== Post-football ==
Ofahengaue currently lives in Utah with his wife Carey and their seven children. He and his wife own a private foster agency together, Crossroads Youth Services. Ofahengaue is currently serving as the football Director of Player Personnel at BYU.

=== Legal troubles ===
In July 2011, Ofahengaue, along with Reno Mahe, was charged with theft for allegedly playing a part in stealing more than $55,000 in gasoline from a construction company in 2010. In January 2014, all charges were dropped and dismissed in court by Judge Denise Lindberg.
