= List of killings by law enforcement officers in the United States, November 2016 =

This is a list of people reported killed by non-military law enforcement officers in the United States in November 2016, whether in the line of duty or not, and regardless of reason or method. The listing documents the occurrence of a death, making no implications regarding wrongdoing or justification on the part of the person killed or officer involved. Killings are arranged by date of the incident that caused death. Different death dates, if known, are noted in the description. The table below lists 92 people.

== November 2016 ==
Date	Name (age) of deceased	Race	State (city)	Description
2016-11-30	Raymond Updegraff (74)	White	Pennsylvania (East Manchester Township)	Updegraff, a homeless pedestrian, was struck and killed by an unmarked police vehicle as he crossed the street.
2016-11-30	David K. Crosby-Dowdy (25)	Black	Missouri (Kansas City)	A man was shot by police after allegedly reaching for a gun while officers attempted to arrest him. The man was a suspect in a robbery and had been pulled over as part of a planned arrest.
2016-11-29	Toby Cummins (55)	White	Texas (Friendswood)	Police say Cummins was armed with a boxcutter when an officer shot and killed him. The officer was responding to a report of a theft.
2016-11-29	Bradley King (29)	White	Indiana (Avon)	King was shot in the torso and killed by an officer after he "rapidly approached" the officer with a knife. Two officers were responding to a residence from which an accidental 911 call had been received when they found King in the backyard.
2016-11-29	Alexander Chance Partain (31)	White	South Carolina (Iva)	
2016-11-28	Jason Stringer (35)	Black	Illinois (Cahokia)	
2016-11-28	Pablo Renato Cartagena (23)	Hispanic	California (Los Angeles)	A man was shot and killed by an LAPD officer in the backyard of a home. Officers had pursued the man there, having suspected him of burglarizing a car in the area.
2016-11-28	Irecas Rayshion Valentine (41)	Black	North Carolina (Hickory)	Valentine was shot and killed by a Catawba County deputy after allegedly ramming his vehicle into a patrol car while attempting to flee police. Narcotics investigators were doing surveillance on Valentine's house when the encounter occurred. Valentine was also shot by police during a traffic stop in 2011 and survived.
2016-11-28	Abdul Razak Ali Artan (18)	Black	Ohio (Columbus)	Artan was shot and killed by Ohio State University Police Officer Alan Horujko after a terrorist vehicle-ramming and stabbing of students in the 2016 Ohio State University attack.
2016-11-28	Michael McInnis (41)	White	Massachusetts (Lynn)	McInnis was shot and killed by a Lynn police officer after allegedly moving toward officers with his hands in his pockets and refusing police orders to show his hands. McInnis was a suspect in an attempted armed robbery.
2016-11-27	Terrell Walker (48)	Black	Louisiana (Baton Rouge)	Walker was shot and killed after firing on officers. Walker was suspected of fatally shooting his girlfriend, throwing her out of a car, running over two people, shooting an emergency responder, and crashing into an ambulance. Police encountered him walking several hours later.
2016-11-27	Richard Grimes (33)	Black	Illinois (Chicago)	Grimes was killed by officers after allegedly shooting at police. Officers were pursuing Grimes after he shot his fiancée in the abdomen, police say.
2016-11-27	Walter R. Echols (50)	White	Kansas (Olathe)	Echols was shot and killed by police in a Wal-Mart parking lot after allegedly attacking police with a long, cylindrical object "similar to a martial arts bo staff." Officers were responding to a call about a man on the premises.
2016-11-27	Norman J. Strobel (59)	White	Maine (Naples)	
2016-11-26	Derek Adame (20)	Hispanic	Arizona (Surprise)	Police shot and killed Adame inside his car during an altercation. The officer was responding to a report of a suspicious vehicle.
2016-11-25	Carlos Valencia (26)	Hispanic	Arizona (Tucson)	
2016-11-25	Jerome Chris Harmon (23)	Black	Mississippi (Hattiesburg)	Harmon was shot and killed by a Hattiesburg police officer after he allegedly fired shots at the officer while fleeing on foot. Police say Harmon was a suspect in a burglary and credit card fraud.
2016-11-25	Cleotha Mitchell (37)	Black	Illinois (Chicago)	Mitchell was shot and killed by Chicago police officers who say they saw him standing over another man, shooting him. Officers were responding to a call of gunfire.
2016-11-24	Don Fitzgerald White (45)	Unknown race	Tennessee (Jackson)	White was shot and killed by Jackson police officers at Pathways Behavioral Health Services, where he was a patient. Police were responding to a worker being stabbed by a patient. They shot White after "the situation escalated."
2016-11-24	Logan Ron Augustine (17)	White	California (Carmichael)	
2016-11-23	Kajuan Raye (19)	Black	Illinois (Chicago)	Raye was shot in the back and killed by police sergeant who believed he matched the description of a battery suspect. The sergeant claimed Raye turned and pointed a gun at him twice during a pursuit. A grid search by police failed to locate a weapon.
2016-11-23	William J. Beavers (43)	White	Florida (St. Petersburg)	
2016-11-23	David Leroy Thelen (43)	White	Michigan (Holland)	An officer shot Thelen three times, killing him, after Thelen allegedly refused to drop a large knife he was holding and moved toward officers with the knife. Police were responding to a medical emergency.
2016-11-22	Ivory C. Pantallion III (36)	Black	Texas (Baytown)	A man was shot and killed by state troopers and deputies after allegedly displaying a gun during a highway chase. The chase began when the man fled an attempted traffic stop by a deputy.
2016-11-22	Talif Scudder (23)	Black	New Jersey (Newark)	
2016-11-22	Mark Daniel Sly (45)	Hispanic	California (La Mirada)	
2016-11-22	Greta Kurian (22)	White	California (Long Beach)	
2016-11-22	Elijah Cobb (17)	Black	Texas (Shenandoah)	
2016-11-22	Frank Clark (34)	Black	North Carolina (Durham)	Clark was shot and killed by Officer M.D. Southerland of Durham's Violent Incidence Response team at an intersection around 12:30 pm. Southerland and two other officers were speaking with Clark when he allegedly reached suddenly toward his waistband, prompting Southerland to shoot him.
2016-11-21	Sarah Palmer (35)	White	Washington (Hoquiam)	Palmer died after struggling with officers during her arrest. Officers used a TASER and wrestled the woman onto the floor where she was handcuffed and became unresponsive. Police were responding to a reported assault between two residents at a group home. Palmer was the suspect in the assault.
2016-11-21	Michael Giles (27)	White	California (Lompoc)	Giles was shot and killed by Lompoc Police Corporal Charles Scott after allegedly rushing toward officers with a knife. Officers were responding to a call about a possibly drunk man threatening patrons at a laundromat.
2016-11-20	Jacob Stevens (18)	White	Missouri (Gladstone)	Stevens was shot and killed by police while struggling with officers who were attempting to take him into custody. Shots were fired after Stevens allegedly displayed a handgun, killing Stevens and injuring an officer. Stevens was a passenger in a vehicle stopped for a traffic violation and was pursued by officers when he fled on foot.
2016-11-20	George Bush III (19)	Black	Missouri (St. Louis)	Bush, a suspect in a murder and other crimes, allegedly pulled up next to a police sergeant at a traffic light and shot him in the face twice, then fled the scene. He was killed by police after a chase and a gun battle.
2016-11-20	Adalid Flores (29)	Hispanic	California (Anaheim)	A man was shot and killed by police while fleeing officers on foot. The man was suspected of ramming a vehicle on the highway.
2016-11-20	Andrew Moreno (24)	Hispanic	Texas (San Antonio)	A man was shot and killed by three SWAT officers when he allegedly pointed a gun at them following a seven-hour standoff.
2016-11-19	Erickson Gomez Brito (21)	Black	New York (Brooklyn)	Officers Jennifer Garcia and Andris Bisogno shot and killed Brito in a Brooklyn housing project. The officers were investigating a report of a suspicious person in the building around 1:30 p.m. A scuffle ensued when the officers encountered Brito and asked for his identification. Police say Officer Bisogno removed his baton, and Brito took it from him and assaulted both officers with it before they killed him.
2016-11-19	Luke Smith (15)	Pacific Islander	California (Corralitos)	A Santa Cruz county sheriff's deputy shot and killed Smith as he struggled with a K9 unit, according to police. Before killing him, deputies had also fired stun guns and foam rounds in efforts to subdue Smith as he allegedly ran down a street with a knife. Police had been called to a home where two of Smith's relatives had been stabbed. Smith was the suspect in the stabbing.
2016-11-19	Steve Dwayne Vananda (55)	Unknown race	Oklahoma (Chickasha)	Officers were responding to a disturbance call at a home around 2 a.m. When officers entered the home, Vananda allegedly grabbed a handgun and an officer shot him at least one time, killing him.
2016-11-18	Darius Jones (26)	Black	Illinois (Chicago)	A man was shot and killed by a Chicago police officer while allegedly shooting at another man and refusing to drop his weapon. Officers were patrolling the area in a vehicle when they encountered the men.
2016-11-18	Gabriel Parker (48)	Black	Arizona (Casa Grande)	Casa Grande Police Officers Bryan Martinez, Jeremy Ybarra and Efren Lujan shot and killed Parker after he refused their commands to drop a machete. Police say the officers used bean bags and tasers before killing him. The officers had responded to the home when a friend or relative called and said Parker was trying to harm himself.
2016-11-18	Joseph Leland Fletcher (35)	White	Florida (Fort Walton Beach)	Fletcher was killed by an Okaloosa County sheriff's deputy who was serving him with an arrest warrant. Police say Fletcher violently attacked deputies and gained control of one deputy's gun before another deputy shot him in the chest.
2016-11-18	Samson Fleurant (25)	Black	Florida (Port St. Lucie)	Fleurant was shot and killed by Officer Colin Duncombe after he walked toward officers with a machete. Police were responding to a call from someone in the home who said Fleurant was armed with a knife.
2016-11-18	Dontrell Montese Carter (25)	Black	Georgia (Ludowici)	
2016-11-16	Jose Gregory Anthony Franco (37)	Hispanic	California (Whittier)	
2016-11-16	Edmund Charles Leighty Sr. (56)	White	California (Redding)	
2016-11-16	Johnson, Bruce Lee Edward (39)		Missouri (St. Joseph)	Johnson became unconscious after being shot by police with a Taser device and later died. Buchanan County Drug Strike Force officers had approached a residence while searching for a suspect when they encountered Johnson, who they say was armed with a baseball bat and resisted arrest.
2016-11-15	Michael Cookson (48)	Unknown race	California (Temecula)	Cookson was shot and killed by a court services deputy in the parking lot of the Walt P. Abraham County Administration Center after allegedly moving toward the deputy with a knife. The deputy was responding to a domestic incident between Cookson and a woman in the parking lot.
2016-11-15	Robert Daffern (37)	White	Texas (Webster)	
2016-11-15	Rasheem Singletary (25)	Black	Pennsylvania (York)	
2016-11-13	Jonathan M. Young (38)	White	Pennsylvania (Bloomsburg)	
2016-11-13	Daniel Laguna (21)	Hispanic	Oklahoma (Oklahoma City)	
2016-11-13	Juan Carlos Fernandez (22)	Hispanic	California (San Diego)	A man was shot to death by an officer as he held a woman in a headlock and pointed a gun at her, police say. Officers were responding to reports of disturbance and a man with a gun. According to police, the man had shot four people, killing one, before they arrived.
2016-11-12	Weems, Jackie Sanders Jr. (44)		Georgia (McDonough)	Weems became unresponsive and later died after police used a Taser on him. Officers were responding to a robbery at a motel when they encountered Weems, who police say resisted and fought with officers.
2016-11-12	James Dale Ritchie (40)	White	Alaska (Anchorage)	Ritchie was shot and killed in a shootout after he shot Officer Arn Salao six times in his car, in an ambush investigating a call over an unpaid cab fare. His recovered weapon was linked to five homicides, including two double homicides. Ritchie was confirmed to be responsible for the five homicides, classifying him as a serial killer.
2016-11-12	Richard T. Herrera Jr. (29)	Hispanic	Arizona (Sahuarita)	
2016-11-11	Brian Gaither (24)	White	Colorado (Grand Junction)	
2016-11-11	William Ray Score Jr. (47)	White	Colorado (Paradox)	
2016-11-11	Marco Romero (33)	Hispanic	Idaho (Boise)	
2016-11-11	Andrew Depeiza	Black	Georgia (East Point)	
2016-11-11	Rebecka J. Pearce (30)	White	North Carolina (Fuquay-Varina)	
2016-11-10	George Delacruz Jr. (41)	Hispanic	Texas (San Angelo)	Delacruz was shot and killed by detectives and special agents outside a Schlotzsky's restaurant after allegedly brandishing a handgun. Officers were attempting to arrest Delacruz, who was charged with felony aggravated assault with a deadly weapon, when they killed him.
2016-11-10	John Pacuicrk (53)	White	Florida (Lakeland)	
2016-11-09	Daniel Erickson (36)	White	Arizona (Lakeside)	
2016-11-08	Evan Cox (26)	White	Ohio (Ashtabula)	
2016-11-08	Juan Ramos (23)	Hispanic	Colorado (Denver)	
2016-11-08	Carlos Mendez (45)	Hispanic	California (Azusa)	
2016-11-08	Kenton J. Kobza (19)	White	Kansas (Hays)	Kotoza was shot and killed by an Ellis County deputy after allegedly physically attacking the deputy and attempting to take his gun following a highway chase. The chase began after Kotoza fled a traffic stop by a Hays police officer for driving left of center.
2016-11-08	Ritchie Lee Harbison (62)	Black	North Carolina (Hendersonville)	Harbison went into cardiac arrest and later died after being Tasered by police. Police say they found him naked and acting irrationally after he had crashed his car into four parked cars. Harbison allegedly charged at officers who were attempting to pin him down.
2016-11-07	Darryl Chisholm (31)	Black	Pennsylvania (Philadelphia)	
2016-11-06	Joseph Newcomb (32)	White	West Virginia (Hensley)	
2016-11-06	David Contreras Jr. (33)	Hispanic	California (Santa Ana)	
2016-11-06	Joel Burt Keenan (43)	White	South Carolina (Beech Island)	
2016-11-06	Jimmy L. Testa (31)	White	New Jersey (Leesburg)	
2016-11-06	Randy Clark Jr. (43)	White	Kentucky (Morgantown)	
2016-11-06	Christian Redwine (17)	White	Alabama (Phenix City)	
2016-11-05	John F. Zemola (49)	White	Florida (St. Petersburg)	
2016-11-05	Edward Lowell Hills (59)	White	Washington (Beaver)	
2016-11-05	James Carl Coale (36)	White	Oklahoma (Okemah)	
2016-11-05	Russell Elswick (56)	White	West Virginia (Clendenin)	
2016-11-05	Joshua Beal (25)	Black	Illinois (Chicago)	
2016-11-05	Patrick Wise (34)	White	Texas (Gladewater)	
2016-11-04	Abraham Ortiz (26)	Hispanic	California (Palm Springs)	
2016-11-04	Manuel Rosales (35)	Hispanic	New York (Bronx)	
2016-11-03	Rita King (56)	White	Georgia (Loganville)	King was shot and killed by deputies after allegedly pointing a gun at them. Officers were responding to a domestic dispute after police say King threatened to kill her brother and elderly mother.
2016-11-03	Ferguson Claude Laurent Jr. (23)	Black	North Carolina, (Salisbury)	Laurent was shot and killed by Salisbury police Officer K. Boehm after allegedly firing a shot while officers executed a no-knock warrant in search of narcotics, weapons, and stolen property.
2016-11-03	Dennis Kirk (64)	Unknown race	Pennsylvania (Chambersburg)	Kirk was shot and killed by officers in Chambersburg Hospital after allegedly brandishing a knife and threatening officers. Police were responding to reports that Kirk, a patient in the hospital, was armed with a knife and threatening staff.
2016-11-02	Wilton Henry (59)	White	Louisiana (Houma)	Henry was fatally shot by an officer after allegedly shooting himself in the chest and pointing his gun at the officer. Police were responding to a call of a suspicious person when they encountered Henry sleeping in his car.
2016-11-02	Jesse Jay Taylor (40)	White	Utah (West Jordan)	Taylor was shot and killed by police during a confrontation with officers after he allegedly robbed a credit union while armed with a gun.
2016-11-02	Ariel Galarza (49)	Hispanic	New York (Bronx)	Police were called at about 5:30 p.m. to 1840 Mayflower Avenue by a neighbor who reported Mr. Galarza yelling and being armed with a knife. As Galarza threatened officers with an intact glass bottle he was subdued by a stun gun, and after resisting, being handcuffed, he was tasered a second time by the same NYPD sergeant. He went into cardiac arrest and died at 7:22 p.m. in Einstein Hospital.
2016-11-01	Keenan Bradley (21)	Black	California (Stockton)	Keenan was shot and killed by an off-duty San Joaquin County sheriff's deputy after allegedly confronting the deputy with a gun while wearing a mask. A second masked gunman fled the scene. The deputy was walking from his car outside an apartment complex with the encounter occurred.
2016-11-01	Henry Simpson (76)	White	Nevada (Carson City)	Simpson was shot three times in the torso by Nevada Highway Patrol Trooper Chris Johnson after allegedly ignoring commands to drop his revolver and aiming it at Johnson. Officers were responding to a report of shots fired at an apartment building. The manager of the apartments had found Simpson in her bathroom with a .32 revolver after he shot a round into the floor. The manager told police she believed Simpson was looking for his dog and was confused about where he was. Simpson had been a resident of the apartment building for 16 years.
2016-11-01	Michael Shriver (39)	White	Oklahoma (Enid)	
