= 2000 Arizona Cardinals season =

NFL team season

- Owner: Bill Bidwill
- Head coach: Vince Tobin (fired October 23, 2-5 record); Dave McGinnis (interim; 1-8 record)
- Offensive coordinator: Marc Trestman
- Defensive coordinator: Dave McGinnis
- Home stadium: Sun Devil Stadium

Results
- Record: 3–13
- Division place: 5th NFC East
- Playoffs: Did not qualify
- Pro Bowlers: P Scott Player

The 2000 season was the Arizona Cardinals' 81st season in the National Football League (NFL), their 102nd overall and their 13th in Arizona. The Cardinals ranked 24th in the NFL in total offense and 30th in total defense. The Cardinals ranked last in the NFC in Takeaways/Giveaways with a rating of −24.

The Cardinals surrendered 443 points in 2000, the second-worst in the NFL that season, and second-worst in franchise history. Arizona's minus-233 point differential is the worst in team history.

Two of the Cardinals' three victories came by one point each (vs. NFC East rivals Dallas and Washington), and they were 0–8 on the road. Following the most lopsided of those eight road losses, 48–7 at Dallas in week eight, coach Vince Tobin was fired, ending his tenure in the desert after 4½ seasons with a 29–44 record. Defensive coordinator Dave McGinnis was named interim coach, and he held the job through the end of the 2003 season. The 3–13 mark would be matched in 2018.

The Cardinals suffered through their poorest season since the 1970 AFL–NFL merger, eclipsing the 4–12 marks of 1991, 1992, 1995 and 1997. The Cardinals also went 4–9–1 in 1971, 1972 and 1973, and 4–11–1 in 1986, and would suffer through another 4–12 campaign in 2003. With the addition of a 17th game to the NFL season in 2021, the franchise record of 13 losses during a single season was eventually surpassed in 2025, with the Cardinals ending 2025 with a record of 3-14.

== Offseason ==
=== Signings ===
Position	Player	1999 team	Date signed	Contract
PK	Cary Blanchard	New York Giants	February 28	Undisclosed
G	Norberto Davidds-Garrido	Carolina Panthers	April 20	2 years
C	Mike Gruttadauria	St. Louis Rams	February 19	4 years, $8.6 million
DT	Tony McCoy	Indianapolis Colts	June 9	2 years

=== Re-signings ===
Position	Player	Designation	Date signed	Contract
DB	Tommy Bennett	UFA	July 22	
QB	Dave Brown	UFA	February 22	2 years
TE	Derek Brown	UFA	April 28	Undisclosed
DE	Jerry Drake	UFA	May 23	Undisclosed
OL	Matt Joyce	UFA	February 22	3 years
TE	Chris Gedney	Other	February 23	Undisclosed
LB	Mark Maddox	UFA		Undisclosed
LB	Ronald McKinnon	UFA	February 24	3 years
DT	Brad Ottis	UFA	March 29	2 years
DT	Mark Smith	RFA	June 28	Undisclosed

=== Departures ===
Position	Player	Reason	2000 team
RB	Mario Bates	Released	Detroit Lions
OT	James Dexter	UFA	Carolina Panthers
C	Aaron Graham	UFA	Kansas City Chiefs
TE	Johnny McWilliams	UFA	Minnesota Vikings
RB	Adrian Murrell	UFA	Washington Redskins
LB	Patrick Sapp	UFA	Indianapolis Colts
DE	Eric Swann	Released	Carolina Panthers

=== NFL draft ===
2000 Arizona Cardinals draft
Round	Pick	Player	Position	College	Notes
1	7	Thomas Jones *	RB	Virginia	
2	41	Raynoch Thompson	LB	Tennessee	
3	71	Darwin Walker	DT	Tennessee	
4	102	David Barrett	CB	Arkansas	
5	136	Mao Tosi	DT	Idaho	
5	164	Jay Tant	TE	Northwestern	compensatory selection
6	176	Jabari Issa	DE	Washington	
7	215	Sekou Sanyika	LB	California	
Made roster † Pro Football Hall of Fame * Made at least one Pro Bowl during career

=== Undrafted free agents ===
2000 undrafted free agents of note
Player	Position	College
Deke Cooper	Safety	Notre Dame
Renard Cox	Cornerback	Maryland
Greg Debolt	Punter	Pittsburgh
Bryan Gilmore	Wide receiver	Midwestern State
Sean Keenan	Quarterback	Williams
Matt Keller	Fullback	Ohio State
John Shoemaker	Wide receiver	UC Davis
David Walden	Guard	Stephen F. Austin
Jordan Younger	Cornerback	UConn

== Personnel ==
2000 Arizona Cardinals staff
Front office: President – Bill Bidwill; Vice president – Larry Wilson; Vice president and general counsel – Michael Bidwill; General manager – Bob Ferguson; Assistant to the president – Rod Graves; Head coaches: Head coach – Vince Tobin (games 1–7); Head coach – Dave McGinnis (games 8–16); Offensive coaches: Offensive coordinator – Marc Trestman; Quarterbacks – John Garrett; Running backs – Johnny Roland; Wide receivers – Vic Rapp; Tight ends – Don Lawrence; Offensive line – George Warhop	Defensive coaches: Defensive coordinator – Dave McGinnis (games 1–7); Defensive line – Joe Greene; Linebackers – Glenn Pires; Defensive backs – Larry Marmie; Quality control – Jeff FitzGerald; Special teams coaches: Special teams – Hank Kuhlmann; Strength and conditioning: Strength and conditioning – Bob Rogucki

== Roster ==
2000 Arizona Cardinals roster
Quarterbacks (QB): 17 Dave Brown; 14 Chris Greisen; 9 Sean Keenan; 16 Jake Plummer; Running backs (RB): 26 Thomas Jones; 34 Joel Makovicka FB; 39 Dennis McKinley FB; 32 Michael Pittman; 21 Clarence Williams; Wide receivers (WR): 89 David Boston; 82 Mac Cody PR; 11 Bryan Gilmore; 19 MarTay Jenkins KR; 81 Frank Sanders; Tight ends (TE): 84 Chris Gedney; 80 Terry Hardy; 83 Tywan Mitchell	Offensive linemen (OL): 66 Ethan Brooks G/T; 65 Anthony Clement T; 64 Norberto Davidds-Garrido G/T; 67 Chris Dishman C/G; 71 Lester Holmes G; 75 Matt Joyce G; 68 Yusuf Scott G; 70 L. J. Shelton T; 50 Jason Starkey C; Defensive linemen (DL): 98 Russell Davis DT; 72 Jabari Issa DE/DT; 96 Brad Ottis DE; 97 Simeon Rice DE; 94 Corey Sears DE; 93 Mark Smith DT; 92 Barron Tanner DT; 78 Mao Tosi DT; 90 Andre Wadsworth DE	Linebackers (LB): 58 James Folston OLB; 59 Rob Fredrickson OLB; 53 Mark Maddox MLB; 57 Ronald McKinnon MLB; 51 Johnny Rutledge OLB; 54 Sekou Sanyika OLB; Defensive backs (DB): 36 David Barrett CB; 28 Tommy Bennett SS; 25 Corey Chavous CB; 22 Tom Knight CB; 42 Kwamie Lassiter FS; 41 Justin Lucas FS; 40 Pat Tillman SS; 35 Aeneas Williams CB; 47 Jordan Younger CB; Special teams (ST): 15 Cary Blanchard K; 86 Trey Junkin LS; 10 Scott Player P	Reserve: 95 Tom Burke DE (IR); 79 Jon Clark T (IR); 60 Mike Gruttadauria C (IR); 44 J. J. McCleskey CB (IR); 61 Tony McCoy DT (IR); 85 Rob Moore WR (IR); 23 Coby Rhinehart CB (IR); 91 Rashod Swinger DT (PUP); 87 Jay Tant TE (IR); 55 Raynoch Thompson LB (IR); 52 Zack Walz LB (IR); Rookies in italics 53 active, 11 reserve

== Preseason ==
Week	Date	Opponent	Result	Record	Venue
1	August 5	Denver Broncos	L 17–31	0–1	Sun Devil Stadium
2	August 12	Seattle Seahawks	W 21–3	1–1	Sun Devil Stadium
3	August 18	at Minnesota Vikings	L 17–35	1–2	Hubert H. Humphrey Metrodome
4	August 25	at San Diego Chargers	L 20–24	1–3	Qualcomm Stadium

== Regular season ==
On December 18, Dave McGinnis was named as the 38th head coach in franchise history. He had been interim coach since October 23, when Vince Tobin was fired.

=== Schedule ===
Week	Date	Opponent	Result	Record	Venue	Attendance
1	September 3	at **New York Giants**	**L** 16–21	0–1	Giants Stadium	77,434
2	September 10	**Dallas Cowboys**	**W** 32–31	1–1	Sun Devil Stadium	66,008
3	Bye					
4	September 24	Green Bay Packers	**L** 3–29	1–2	Sun Devil Stadium	71,801
5	October 1	at San Francisco 49ers	**L** 20–27	1–3	3Com Park	66,985
6	October 8	Cleveland Browns	**W** 29–21	2–3	Sun Devil Stadium	44,296
7	October 15	**Philadelphia Eagles**	**L** 14–33	2–4	Sun Devil Stadium	38,293
8	October 22	at **Dallas Cowboys**	**L** 7–48	2–5	Texas Stadium	62,981
9	October 29	New Orleans Saints	**L** 10–21	2–6	Sun Devil Stadium	35,286
10	November 5	**Washington Redskins**	**W** 16–15	3–6	Sun Devil Stadium	52,244
11	November 12	at Minnesota Vikings	**L** 14–31	3–7	Hubert H. Humphrey Metrodome	64,223
12	November 19	at **Philadelphia Eagles**	**L** 9–34	3–8	Veterans Stadium	65,356
13	November 26	**New York Giants**	**L** 7–31	3–9	Sun Devil Stadium	42,094
14	December 3	at Cincinnati Bengals	**L** 13–24	3–10	Paul Brown Stadium	50,289
15	December 10	at Jacksonville Jaguars	**L** 10–44	3–11	Alltel Stadium	53,472
16	December 17	Baltimore Ravens	**L** 7–13	3–12	Sun Devil Stadium	37,452
17	December 24	at **Washington Redskins**	**L** 3–20	3–13	FedExField	65,711

Note: Intra-division opponents are in bold text.

=== Game summaries ===
==== Week 1: at New York Giants ====
Week 1: Arizona Cardinals at New York Giants – Game summary

Quarter	1	2	3	4	Total
Cardinals	0	0	3	13	**16**
**Giants**	7	7	0	7	**21**

at Giants Stadium, East Rutherford, New Jersey

- Date: September 3
- Game time: 1:05 p.m. EST/11:05 a.m. MST
- Game weather: 80 °F (27 °C)
- Game attendance: 77,434
- Referee: Bill Carollo
- Box Score

Game information

**First quarter**

- NYG – Tiki Barber 10-yard run (Brad Daluiso kick), 0:00. Giants 7–0.

**Second quarter**

- NYG – Tiki Barber 78-yard run (Brad Daluiso kick), 9:31. Giants 14–0.

**Third quarter**

- ARI – Cary Blanchard 32-yard field goal, 0:00. Giants 14–3.

**Fourth quarter**

- NYG – Ron Dayne 7-yard run (Brad Daluiso kick), 7:28. Giants 21–3.
- ARI – David Boston 9-yard pass from Jake Plummer (Cary Blanchard kick), 1:55. Giants 21–10.
- ARI – David Boston 25-yard pass from Jake Plummer (pass failed), 0:32. Giants 21–16.

**Top passers**

- ARI – Jake Plummer – 28/49, 318 yards, 2 TD, 3 INT
- NYG – Kerry Collins – 17/25, 172 yards, INT

**Top rushers**

- ARI – Jake Plummer – 4 rushes, 18 yards
- NYG – Tiki Barber – 13 rushes, 144 yards, 2 TD

**Top receivers**

- ARI – David Boston – 9 receptions, 128 yards, 2 TD
- NYG – Ike Hilliard – 3 receptions, 62 yards

==== Week 2: vs. Dallas Cowboys ====
Week 2: Dallas Cowboys at Arizona Cardinals – Game summary

Quarter	1	2	3	4	Total
Cowboys	7	14	3	7	**31**
**Cardinals**	3	10	10	9	**32**

at Sun Devil Stadium, Tempe, Arizona

- Date: September 10
- Game time: 6:35 p.m. MST
- Game weather: 100 °F (38 °C)
- Game attendance: 66,009
- Referee: Ron Blum
- Box Score

Game information

**First quarter**

- ARI – Cary Blanchard 19-yard field goal, 9:02. Cardinals 3–0.
- DAL – Wane McGarity 64-yard punt return (Tim Seder kick), 4:34. Cowboys 7–3.

**Second quarter**

- ARI – Michael Pittman 1-yard run (Cary Blanchard kick), 12:05. Cardinals 10–7.
- DAL – James McKnight 47-yard pass from Randall Cunningham (Tim Seder kick), 9:04. Cowboys 14–10.
- DAL – Jackie Harris 1-yard pass from Randall Cunningham (Tim Seder kick), 0:26. Cowboys 21–10.
- ARI – Cary Blanchard 54-yard field goal, 0:00. Cowboys 21–13.

**Third quarter**

- DAL – Tim Seder 44-yard field goal, 8:16. Cowboys 24–13.
- ARI – Frank Sanders 4-yard pass from Jake Plummer (Cary Blanchard kick), 2:34. Cowboys 24–20.
- ARI – Cary Blanchard 35-yard field goal, 0:12. Cowboys 24–23.

**Fourth quarter**

- DAL – Michael Wiley 15-yard pass from Randall Cunningham (Tim Seder kick), 8:53. Cowboys 31–23.
- ARI – Cary Blanchard 51-yard field goal, 5:17. Cowboys 31–26.
- ARI – Frank Sanders 17-yard pass from Jake Plummer (run failed), 1:54. Cardinals 32–31.

**Top passers**

- DAL – Randall Cunningham – 24/34, 243 yards, 3 TD
- ARI – Jake Plummer – 18/24, 243 yards, 2 TD

**Top rushers**

- DAL – Emmitt Smith – 16 rushes, 59 yards
- ARI – Thomas Jones – 23 rushes, 70 yards

**Top receivers**

- DAL – James McKnight – 5 receptions, 86 yards, TD
- ARI – David Boston – 6 receptions, 102 yards

==== Week 4: vs. Green Bay Packers ====
Week 4: Green Bay Packers at Arizona Cardinals – Game summary

Quarter	1	2	3	4	Total
**Packers**	7	10	6	6	**29**
Cardinals	0	3	0	0	**3**

at Sun Devil Stadium, Tempe, Arizona

- Date: September 24
- Game time: 2:05 p.m. MST
- Game weather: 87 °F (31 °C)
- Game attendance: 71,801
- Referee: Dick Hantak
- Box Score

Game information

**First quarter**

- GB – Ahman Green 19-yard run (Ryan Longwell kick), 4:36. Packers 7–0.

**Second quarter**

- GB – Bill Schroeder 55-yard pass from Brett Favre (Ryan Longwell kick), 14:05. Packers 14–0.
- ARI – Cary Blanchard 31-yard field goal, 8:48. Packers 14–3.
- GB – Ryan Longwell 38-yard field goal, 2:06. Packers 17–3.

**Third quarter**

- GB – Ryan Longwell 47-yard field goal, 8:47. Packers 20–3.
- GB – Ryan Longwell 48-yard field goal, 0:49. Packers 23–3.

**Fourth quarter**

- GB – Ryan Longwell 37-yard field goal, 9:33. Packers 26–3.
- GB – Ryan Longwell 22-yard field goal, 8:53. Packers 29–3.

**Top passers**

- GB – Brett Favre – 17/31, 277 yards, TD
- ARI – Jake Plummer – 21/43, 189 yards, 4 INT

**Top rushers**

- GB – Ahman Green – 12 rushes, 93 yards, TD
- ARI – Thomas Jones – 10 rushes, 24 yards

**Top receivers**

- GB – Bill Schroeder – 4 receptions, 94 yards, TD
- ARI – Frank Sanders – 7 receptions, 60 yards

==== Week 5: at San Francisco 49ers ====
Week 5: Arizona Cardinals at San Francisco 49ers – Game summary

Quarter	1	2	3	4	Total
Cardinals	0	10	0	10	**20**
**49ers**	7	10	7	3	**27**

at 3Com Park, San Francisco, California

- Date: October 1
- Game time: 1:15 p.m. PST/2:15 p.m. MST
- Game weather: 72 °F (22 °C)
- Game attendance: 66,985
- Referee: Mike Carey
- Box Score

Game information

**First quarter**

- SF – Jerry Rice 5-yard pass from Jeff Garcia (Wade Richey kick), 2:28. 49ers 7–0.

**Second quarter**

- ARI – Cary Blanchard 32-yard field goal, 12:07. 49ers 7–3.
- SF – Wade Richey 33-yard field goal, 1:53. 49ers 10–3.
- SF – Charlie Garner 1-yard run (Wade Richey kick), 0:49. 49ers 17–3.
- ARI – David Boston 56-yard pass from Jake Plummer (Cary Blanchard kick), 0:18. 49ers 17–10.

**Third quarter**

- SF – Charlie Garner 1-yard run (Wade Richey kick), 6:13. 49ers 24–10.

**Fourth quarter**

- SF – Wade Richey 29-yard field goal, 12:18. 49ers 27–10.
- ARI – Cary Blanchard 27-yard field goal, 6:45. 49ers 27–13.
- ARI – Thomas Jones 4-yard run (Cary Blanchard kick), 2:15. 49ers 27–20.

**Top passers**

- ARI – Jake Plummer – 24/41, 239 yards, TD
- SF – Jeff Garcia – 22/33, 220 yards, TD

**Top rushers**

- ARI – Michael Pittman – 11 rushes, 72 yards
- SF – Charlie Garner – 21 rushes, 77 yards, 2 TD

**Top receivers**

- ARI – David Boston – 5 receptions, 87 yards, TD
- SF – Jerry Rice – 7 receptions, 66 yards, TD

==== Week 6: vs. Cleveland Browns ====
Week 6: Cleveland Browns at Arizona Cardinals – Game summary

Quarter	1	2	3	4	Total
Browns	7	7	0	7	**21**
**Cardinals**	0	16	10	3	**29**

at Sun Devil Stadium, Tempe, Arizona

- Date: October 8
- Game time: 2:15 p.m. MST
- Game weather: 87 °F (31 °C)
- Game attendance: 44,269
- Referee: Tom White
- Box Score

Game information

**First quarter**

- CLE – Travis Prentice 1-yard run (Phil Dawson kick), 1:51. Browns 7–0.

**Second quarter**

- CLE – Travis Prentice 1-yard run (Phil Dawson kick), 14:26. Browns 14–0.
- ARI – Thomas Jones 10-yard run (Cary Blanchard kick), 12:00. Browns 14–7.
- ARI – Frank Sanders 53-yard pass from Jake Plummer (kick failed), 9:08. Browns 14–13.
- ARI – Cary Blanchard 36-yard field goal, 1:13. Cardinals 16–14.

**Third quarter**

- ARI – Cary Blanchard 47-yard field goal, 8:55. Cardinals 19–14.
- ARI – Frank Sanders 5-yard pass from Jake Plummer (Cary Blanchard kick), 1:55. Cardinals 26–14.

**Fourth quarter**

- CLE – Travis Prentice 6-yard run (Phil Dawson kick), 12:43. Cardinals 26–21.
- ARI – Cary Blanchard 28-yard field goal, 3:00. Cardinals 29–21.

**Top passers**

- CLE – Tim Couch – 16/22, 138 yards
- ARI – Jake Plummer – 17/30, 171 yards, 2 TD

**Top rushers**

- CLE – Travis Prentice – 28 rushes, 97 yards, 3 TD
- ARI – Michael Pittman – 16 rushes, 107 yards

**Top receivers**

- CLE – Dennis Northcutt – 3 receptions, 67 yards
- ARI – Frank Sanders – 4 receptions, 76 yards, 2 TD

==== Week 7: vs. Philadelphia Eagles ====
Week 7: Philadelphia Eagles at Arizona Cardinals – Game summary

Quarter	1	2	3	4	Total
**Eagles**	7	10	7	9	**33**
Cardinals	0	0	7	7	**14**

at Sun Devil Stadium, Tempe, Arizona

- Date: October 15
- Game time: 2:15 p.m. MST
- Game weather: 80 °F (27 °C)
- Game attendance: 38,293
- Referee: Ron Blum
- Box Score

Game information

**First quarter**

- PHI – Stanley Pritchett 1-yard run (David Akers kick), 5:29. Eagles 7–0.

**Second quarter**

- PHI – David Akers 31-yard field goal, 11:32. Eagles 10–0.
- PHI – Donovan McNabb 3-yard run (David Akers kick), 0:25. Eagles 17–0.

**Third quarter**

- PHI – Chad Lewis 9-yard pass from Donovan McNabb (David Akers kick), 9:16. Eagles 24–0.
- ARI – David Boston 70-yard pass from Jake Plummer (Cary Blanchard kick), 4:33. Eagles 24–7.

**Fourth quarter**

- ARI – Michael Pittman 10-yard pass from Jake Plummer (Cary Blanchard kick), 10:47. Eagles 24–14.
- PHI – Darnell Autry 1-yard run (kick failed), 5:28. Eagles 30–14.
- PHI – David Akers 29-yard field goal, 2:44. Eagles 33–14.

**Top passers**

- PHI – Donovan McNabb – 24/34, 226 yards, TD
- ARI – Jake Plummer – 18/30, 213 yards, 2 TD, 2 INT

**Top rushers**

- PHI – Darnell Autry – 20 rushes, 64 yards, TD
- ARI – Jake Plummer – 2 rushes, 43 yards

**Top receivers**

- PHI – Charles Johnson – 4 receptions, 68 yards
- ARI – David Boston – 6 receptions, 123 yards, TD

==== Week 8: at Dallas Cowboys ====
Week 8: Arizona Cardinals at Dallas Cowboys – Game summary

Quarter	1	2	3	4	Total
Cardinals	0	0	0	7	**7**
**Cowboys**	14	13	14	7	**48**

at Texas Stadium, Dallas, Texas

- Date: October 22
- Game time: 12:00 p.m. CST/11:00 a.m. MST
- Game weather: 70 °F (21 °C)
- Game attendance: 62,981
- Referee: Bernie Kukar
- Box Score

Game information

**First quarter**

- DAL – Emmitt Smith 1-yard run (Tim Seder kick), 3:26. Cowboys 7–0.
- DAL – Wane McGarity 59-yard punt return (Tim Seder kick), 1:01. Cowboys 14–0.

**Second quarter**

- DAL – Chris Warren 32-yard run (Tim Seder kick), 10:52. Cowboys 21–0.
- DAL – Tim Seder 32-yard field goal, 1:30. Cowboys 24–0.
- DAL – Tim Seder 23-yard field goal, 0:00. Cowboys 27–0.

**Third quarter**

- DAL – Rocket Ismail 24-yard pass from Troy Aikman (Tim Seder kick), 6:50. Cowboys 34–0.
- DAL – Chris Warren 10-yard run (Tim Seder kick), 4:03. Cowboys 41–0.

**Fourth quarter**

- DAL – Robert Thomas 2-yard pass from Troy Aikman (Tim Seder kick), 12:21. Cowboys 48–0.
- ARI – Michael Pittman 1-yard run (Cary Blanchard kick), 5:29. Cowboys 48–7.

**Top passers**

- ARI – Jake Plummer – 20/31, 180 yards, 3 INT
- DAL – Troy Aikman – 9/15, 154 yards, 2 TD

**Top rushers**

- ARI – Thomas Jones – 11 rushes, 50 yards
- DAL – Emmitt Smith – 24 rushes, 112 yards, TD

**Top receivers**

- ARI – David Boston – 3 receptions, 50 yards
- DAL – James McKnight – 3 receptions, 75 yards

==== Week 9: vs. New Orleans Saints ====
Week 9: New Orleans Saints at Arizona Cardinals – Game summary

Quarter	1	2	3	4	Total
**Saints**	7	0	7	7	**21**
Cardinals	7	3	0	0	**10**

at Sun Devil Stadium, Tempe, Arizona

- Date: October 29
- Game time: 2:05 p.m. MST
- Game weather: 70 °F (21 °C)
- Game attendance: 35,286
- Referee: Larry Nemmers
- Box Score

Game information

**First quarter**

- NO – Lamont Hall 1-yard pass from Jeff Blake (Doug Brien kick), 2:31. Saints 7–0.
- ARI – Terry Hardy 3-yard pass from Jake Plummer (Cary Blanchard kick), 0:12. Tied 7–7.

**Second quarter**

- ARI – Cary Blanchard 34-yard field goal, 5:23. Cardinals 10–7.

**Third quarter**

- NO – Keith Mitchell 40-yard interception return (Doug Brien kick), 5:07. Saints 14–10.

**Fourth quarter**

- NO – Ricky Williams 1-yard run (Doug Brien kick), 10:32. Saints 21–10.

**Top passers**

- NO – Jeff Blake – 16/26, 167 yards, TD, INT
- ARI – Jake Plummer – 26/47, 289 yards, TD, 2 INT

**Top rushers**

- NO – Ricky Williams – 21 rushes, 54 yards, TD
- ARI – Michael Pittman – 20 rushes, 86 yards

**Top receivers**

- NO – Ricky Williams – 9 receptions, 92 yards
- ARI – Frank Sanders – 2 receptions, 54 yards

==== Week 10: vs. Washington Redskins ====
Week 10: Washington Redskins at Arizona Cardinals – Game summary

Quarter	1	2	3	4	Total
Redskins	3	9	3	0	**15**
**Cardinals**	10	0	6	0	**16**

at Sun Devil Stadium, Tempe, Arizona

- Date: November 5
- Game time: 2:05 p.m. MST
- Game weather: 65 °F (18 °C)
- Game attendance: 52,244
- Referee: Bill Carollo
- Box Score

Game information

**First quarter**

- ARI – Aeneas Williams 103-yard fumble return (Cary Blanchard kick), 10:38. Cardinals 7–0.
- ARI – Cary Blanchard 30-yard field goal, 7:28. Cardinals 10–0.
- WAS – Kris Heppner 35-yard field goal, 3:18. Cardinals 10–3.

**Second quarter**

- WAS – Stephen Davis 1-yard run (run failed), 8:43. Cardinals 10–9.
- WAS – Kris Heppner 28-yard field goal, 1:52. Redskins 12–10.

**Third quarter**

- ARI – Michael Pittman 7-yard run (pass failed), 13:44. Cardinals 16–12.
- WAS – Kris Heppner 29-yard field goal, 4:43. Cardinals 16–15.

**Fourth quarter**

- No scoring plays

**Top passers**

- WAS – Jeff George – 20/39, 276 yards, 2 INT
- ARI – Jake Plummer – 12/19, 146 yards, INT

**Top rushers**

- WAS – Stephen Davis – 30 rushes, 124 yards, TD
- ARI – Michael Pittman – 15 rushes, 30 yards, TD

**Top receivers**

- WAS – James Thrash – 6 receptions, 102 yards
- ARI – David Boston – 3 receptions, 57 yards

==== Week 11: at Minnesota Vikings ====
Week 11: Arizona Cardinals at Minnesota Vikings – Game summary

Quarter	1	2	3	4	Total
Cardinals	7	0	0	7	**14**
**Vikings**	7	3	7	14	**31**

at Hubert H. Humphrey Metrodome, Minneapolis, Minnesota

- Date: November 12
- Game time: 1:00 p.m. CST/12:00 p.m. MST
- Game weather: None (Indoor stadium)
- Game attendance: 64,223
- Referee: Bob McElwee
- Box Score

Game information

**First quarter**

- MIN – Robert Smith 33-yard pass from Daunte Culpepper (Gary Anderson kick), 6:42. Vikings 7–0.
- ARI – Michael Pittman 1-yard run (Cary Blanchard kick), 0:13. Tied 7–7.

**Second quarter**

- MIN – Gary Anderson 33-yard field goal, 0:00. Vikings 10–7.

**Third quarter**

- MIN – Randy Moss 4-yard pass from Daunte Culpepper (Gary Anderson kick), 10:15. Vikings 17–7.

**Fourth quarter**

- MIN – Daunte Culpepper 3-yard run (Gary Anderson kick), 10:11. Vikings 24–7.
- MIN – Cris Carter 12-yard pass from Daunte Culpepper (Gary Anderson kick), 3:45. Vikings 31–7.
- ARI – MarTay Jenkins 98-yard kickoff return (Cary Blanchard kick), 3:30. Vikings 31–14.

**Top passers**

- ARI – Jake Plummer – 19/28, 219 yards
- MIN – Daunte Culpepper – 25/32, 302 yards, 3 TD, INT

**Top rushers**

- ARI – Michael Pittman – 12 rushes, 50 yards, TD
- MIN – Robert Smith – 20 rushes, 117 yards

**Top receivers**

- ARI – Frank Sanders – 5 receptions, 82 yards
- MIN – Cris Carter – 11 receptions, 119 yards, TD

==== Week 12: at Philadelphia Eagles ====
Week 12: Arizona Cardinals at Philadelphia Eagles – Game summary

Quarter	1	2	3	4	Total
Cardinals	3	0	0	6	**9**
**Eagles**	0	10	7	17	**34**

at Veterans Stadium, Philadelphia, Pennsylvania

- Date: November 19
- Game time: 1:00 p.m. CST/12:00 p.m. MST
- Game weather: 39 °F (4 °C)
- Game attendance: 65,356
- Referee: Phil Luckett
- Box Score

Game information

**First quarter**

- ARI – Cary Blanchard 42-yard field goal, 8:02. Cardinals 3–0.

**Second quarter**

- PHI – David Akers 38-yard field goal, 8:52. Tied 3–3.
- PHI – Jeff Thomason 1-yard pass from Donovan McNabb (David Akers kick), 0:19. Eagles 10–3.

**Third quarter**

- PHI – Donovan McNabb 7-yard run (David Akers kick), 6:28. Eagles 17–3.

**Fourth quarter**

- PHI – David Akers 46-yard field goal, 9:02. Eagles 20–3.
- PHI – Mike Caldwell 26-yard interception return (David Akers kick), 7:40. Eagles 27–3.
- ARI – David Boston 44-yard pass from Dave Brown (pass failed), 4:43. Eagles 27–9.
- PHI – Darnell Autry 1-yard run (David Akers kick), 1:57. Eagles 34–9.

**Top passers**

- ARI – Dave Brown – 11/13, 140 yards, TD, INT
- PHI – Donovan McNabb – 25/34, 217 yards, TD, INT

**Top rushers**

- ARI – Michael Pittman – 13 rushes, 49 yards
- PHI – Darnell Autry – 16 rushes, 59 yards, TD

**Top receivers**

- ARI – David Boston – 6 receptions, 94 yards, TD
- PHI – Chad Lewis – 5 receptions, 52 yards

==== Week 13: vs. New York Giants ====
Week 13: New York Giants at Arizona Cardinals – Game summary

Quarter	1	2	3	4	Total
**Giants**	7	7	7	10	**31**
Cardinals	0	0	7	0	**7**

at Sun Devil Stadium, Tempe, Arizona

- Date: November 26
- Game time: 6:35 p.m. MST
- Game weather: 64 °F (18 °C)
- Game attendance: 42,094
- Referee: Walt Coleman
- Box Score

Game information

**First quarter**

- NYG – Dan Campbell 5-yard pass from Kerry Collins (Brad Daluiso kick), 9:32. Giants 7–0.

**Second quarter**

- NYG – Ron Dayne 1-yard run (Brad Daluiso kick), 10:15. Giants 14–0.

**Third quarter**

- NYG – Tiki Barber 23-yard run (Brad Daluiso kick), 6:24. Giants 21–0.
- ARI – Michael Pittman 36-yard pass from Dave Brown (Cary Blanchard kick), 2:01. Giants 21–7.

**Fourth quarter**

- NYG – Amani Toomer 19-yard run (Brad Daluiso kick), 10:06. Giants 28–7.
- NYG – Brad Daluiso 25-yard field goal, 6:49. Cardinals 31–7.

**Top passers**

- NYG – Kerry Collins – 20/30, 232 yards, TD
- ARI – Dave Brown – 18/36, 192 yards, TD, INT

**Top rushers**

- NYG – Ron Dayne – 24 rushes, 85 yards, TD
- ARI – Michael Pittman – 13 rushes, 77 yards

**Top receivers**

- NYG – Joe Jurevicius – 5 receptions, 71 yards
- ARI – Michael Pittman – 10 receptions, 96 yards, TD

==== Week 14: at Cincinnati Bengals ====
Week 14: Arizona Cardinals at Cincinnati Bengals – Game summary

Quarter	1	2	3	4	Total
Cardinals	0	0	7	6	**13**
**Bengals**	7	7	7	3	**24**

at Paul Brown Stadium, Cincinnati, Ohio

- Date: December 3
- Game time: 1:00 p.m. EST/11:00 a.m. MST
- Game weather: 32 °F (0 °C)
- Game attendance: 50,289
- Referee: Johnny Grier
- Box Score

Game information

**First quarter**

- CIN – Tony McGee 2-yard pass from Scott Mitchell (Neil Rackers kick), 10:46. Bengals 7–0.

**Second quarter**

- CIN – Corey Dillon 1-yard run (Neil Rackers kick), 0:46. Bengals 14–0.

**Third quarter**

- CIN – Brandon Bennett 7-yard run (Neil Rackers kick), 11:34. Bengals 21–0.
- ARI – David Boston 38-yard pass from Jake Plummer (Cary Blanchard kick), 4:08. Bengals 21–7.

**Fourth quarter**

- ARI – David Boston 15-yard pass from Jake Plummer (kick failed), 13:45. Bengals 21–13.
- CIN – Neil Rackers 32-yard field goal, 1:02. Bengals 24–13.

**Top passers**

- ARI – Jake Plummer – 22/44, 278 yards, 2 TD, INT
- CIN – Scott Mitchell – 11/23, 109 yards, TD, INT

**Top rushers**

- ARI – Michael Pittman – 19 rushes, 72 yards
- CIN – Corey Dillon – 35 rushes, 216 yards, TD

**Top receivers**

- ARI – David Boston – 9 receptions, 184 yards, 2 TD
- CIN – Peter Warrick – 3 receptions, 42 yards

==== Week 15: at Jacksonville Jaguars ====
Week 15: Arizona Cardinals at Jacksonville Jaguars – Game summary

Quarter	1	2	3	4	Total
Cardinals	0	3	0	7	**10**
**Jaguars**	10	17	10	7	**44**

at Alltel Stadium, Jacksonville, Florida

- Date: December 10
- Game time: 1:00 p.m. EST/11:00 a.m. MST
- Game weather: 61 °F (16 °C)
- Game attendance: 53,472
- Referee: Mike Carey
- Box Score

Game information

**First quarter**

- JAX – Mike Hollis 36-yard field goal, 9:11. Jaguars 3–0.
- JAX – Fred Taylor 1-yard run (Mike Hollis kick), 7:15. Jaguars 10–0.

**Second quarter**

- JAX – Kyle Brady 8-yard pass from Mark Brunell (Mike Hollis kick), 12:49. Jaguars 17–0.
- JAX – Fred Taylor 4-yard run (Mike Hollis kick), 6:31. Jaguars 24–0.
- ARI – Cary Blanchard 32-yard field goal, 1:08. Jaguars 24–3.
- JAX – Mike Hollis 50-yard field goal, 0:04. Jaguars 27–3.

**Third quarter**

- JAX – Mike Hollis 40-yard field goal, 9:04. Jaguars 30–3.
- JAX – Keenan McCardell 25-yard pass from Mark Brunell (Mike Hollis kick), 5:33. Jaguars 37–3.

**Fourth quarter**

- JAX – Jimmy Smith 65-yard pass from Jaime Martin (Mike Hollis kick), 14:27. Jaguars 44–3.
- ARI – Frank Sanders 26-yard pass from Chris Greisen (Cary Blanchard kick), 9:45. Jaguars 44–10.

**Top passers**

- ARI – Dave Brown – 11/19, 135 yards, INT
- JAX – Mark Brunell – 13/18, 182 yards, 2 TD

**Top rushers**

- ARI – Thomas Jones – 7 rushes, 40 yards
- JAX – Fred Taylor – 23 rushes, 137 yards, 2 TD

**Top receivers**

- ARI – Frank Sanders – 4 receptions, 90 yards, TD
- JAX – Jimmy Smith – 8 receptions, 147 yards, TD

==== Week 16: vs. Baltimore Ravens ====
Week 16: Baltimore Ravens at Arizona Cardinals – Game summary

Quarter	1	2	3	4	Total
**Ravens**	3	0	10	0	**13**
Cardinals	0	0	7	0	**7**

at Sun Devil Stadium, Tempe, Arizona

- Date: December 17
- Game time: 2:15 p.m. MST
- Game weather: 68 °F (20 °C)
- Game attendance: 37,452
- Referee: Larry Nemmers
- Box Score

Game information

**First quarter**

- BAL – Matt Stover 42-yard field goal, 7:12. Ravens 3–0.

**Second quarter**

- No scoring plays

**Third quarter**

- ARI – Frank Sanders 27-yard pass from Jake Plummer (Cary Blanchard kick), 9:41. Cardinals 7–3.
- BAL – Jamal Lewis 1-yard run (Matt Stover kick), 6:18. Ravens 10–7.
- BAL – Matt Stover 42-yard field goal, 0:21. Ravens 13–7.

**Fourth quarter**

- No scoring plays

**Top passers**

- BAL – Trent Dilfer – 12/22, 70 yards, INT
- ARI – Jake Plummer – 23/43, 266 yards, TD, 2 INT

**Top rushers**

- BAL – Jamal Lewis – 29 rushes, 126 yards, TD
- ARI – Thomas Jones – 14 rushes, 39 yards

**Top receivers**

- BAL – Shannon Sharpe – 4 receptions, 43 yards
- ARI – David Boston – 5 receptions, 93 yards

==== Week 17: at Washington Redskins ====
Week 17: Arizona Cardinals at Washington Redskins – Game summary

Quarter	1	2	3	4	Total
Cardinals	0	3	0	0	**3**
**Redskins**	14	6	0	0	**20**

at FedEx Field, Landover, Maryland

- Date: December 24
- Game time: 1:00 p.m. EST/11:00 a.m. MST
- Game weather: 34 °F (1 °C)
- Game attendance: 65,711
- Referee: Jeff Triplette
- Box Score

Game information

**First quarter**

- WAS – Champ Bailey 7-yard run (Eddie Murray kick), 10:56. Redskins 7–0.
- WAS – Irving Fryar 7-yard pass from Brad Johnson (Eddie Murray kick), 6:39. Redskins 14–0.

**Second quarter**

- WAS – Eddie Murray 41-yard field goal, 14:56. Redskins 17–0.
- WAS – Scott Bentley 50-yard field goal, 9:15. Redskins 20–0.
- ARI – Cary Blanchard 37-yard field goal, 1:06. Redskins 20–3.

**Third quarter**

- No scoring plays

**Fourth quarter**

- No scoring plays

**Top passers**

- ARI – Jake Plummer – 14/31, 144 yards, 3 INT
- WAS – Brad Johnson – 19/32, 192 yards, TD, 2 INT

**Top rushers**

- ARI – Michael Pittman – 16 rushes, 72 yards
- WAS – Stephen Davis – 27 rushes, 120 yards

**Top receivers**

- ARI – Tywan Mitchell – 2 receptions, 53 yards
- WAS – Champ Bailey – 2 receptions, 54 yards

=== Standings ===
NFC East
	W	L	T	PCT	PF	PA	STK
^{(1)} New York Giants	12	4	0	.750	328	246	W5
^{(4)} Philadelphia Eagles	11	5	0	.688	351	245	W2
Washington Redskins	8	8	0	.500	281	269	W1
Dallas Cowboys	5	11	0	.313	294	361	L2
Arizona Cardinals	3	13	0	.188	210	443	L7

== Best performances ==
- David Boston, Week 1, 128 Receiving Yards vs. New York Giants
- David Boston, Week 2, 102 Receiving Yards vs. Dallas Cowboys
- David Boston, Week 7, 123 Receiving Yards vs. Philadelphia Eagles
- David Boston, Week 14, 184 Receiving Yards vs. Cincinnati Bengals
- Jake Plummer, Week 1, 318 Passing Yards vs. New York Giants
- Simeon Rice, Week 12, 3.0 Quarterback Sacks vs. Philadelphia Eagles

== Records ==
- Led NFL, kickoffs, 86
- Led NFL, kickoff yards returned, 2296
- Led NFL, average kickoff yards per return, 26.7
- Led NFL, kickoff returns for touchdowns, 3
