= Northway Mall =

Northway Mall is the name of multiple shopping malls in the United States:

- Northway Mall (Anchorage, Alaska)
- Northway Mall (Colonie, NY), former name of Northway Shopping Center
- Northway Mall (Ross Township, PA) the former name of The Block Northway
- Northway Mall (Marshfield, WI), former name of Shoppes at Woodridge
