= Sean Keenan =

Sean Keenan may refer to:

- Sean Keenan (actor) (born 1993), Australian actor
- Sean Keenan (American football) (born 1977), American football player
- Seán Keenan (died 1993), Irish republican from Derry, Northern Ireland
- Shaun Keenan (comic creator/publisher) (born 1981), Australian comic creator and publisher
