= James Dale Ritchie =

American serial killer (1976–2016)

- Driver's license photograph
- Born: November 4, 1976; Anchorage, Alaska, U.S.
- Died: November 12, 2016 (aged 40); Anchorage, Alaska, U.S.
- Cause of death: Gunshot wounds
- Education: West Virginia University (dropped out)
- Height: 6 ft 3 in (1.91 m)
- Status: Deceased
- Convictions: Numerous drug-related offenses (1998–2005); Burglary (2005)
- Penalty: 2 years in prison (2005)

Details
- Victims: 5 killed, 1 injured
- Span of crimes: July – August 2016
- Country: United States
- State: Alaska
- Weapon: Colt Python

James Dale Ritchie (November 4, 1976 – November 12, 2016) was an American serial killer who, throughout 2016, murdered five individuals in and around Anchorage, Alaska, most of whom were in parks or along bike paths. He always committed his murders at night, often around midnight or a short time after. Ritchie was killed during a shootout with police officers in downtown Anchorage on November 12, 2016. Following his death, a Colt Python handgun on his person connected him to the string of murders he committed over the course of two months.

== Personal history ==
James Dale Ritchie was born on November 4, 1976. He grew up in Anchorage's Wonder Park neighborhood and attended East Anchorage High School, where – standing at 6 ft 3 in (1.91 m) – he was a standout athlete, having played on the 1994 state championship football and basketball teams alongside future professional athletes Trajan Langdon and Mao Tosi. Ritchie was a close friend of Quincy and Bobby Thompson, whose family hosted him often throughout his teenage years.

Ritchie scored 1200 on his SAT and was recruited by the West Virginia University (WVU) football team in 1994, one day following the death of Quincy. He subsequently fell out of contact with the Thompson family.

After a semester at WVU, Ritchie dropped out and returned to Alaska, and became involved in drug dealing and dog fighting in 1995. By 1998, Ritchie had adopted the street name "Tiny". Over the following seven years, Ritchie was arrested a number of times, predominantly for drug-related offenses. He was arrested for the last time in Alaska in 2005, when he was apprehended while committing a home invasion with plastic handcuffs and two handguns in his possession. After serving two years in custody, he resided in Alaska, during which time he acquired a Colt Python handgun.

In 2013, Ritchie lent his handgun over to an acquaintance and moved to Broadway, Virginia, where his parents had been living at the time. Save for a pair of moving violations, Ritchie had no court appearances and was observed by the police as being a law-abiding citizen. Following a breakup with his girlfriend, Ritchie returned to Alaska in March 2016. He reacquired the Colt Python from his acquaintance and moved to Airport Heights, where he stayed before moving to Penland Parkway trailer park in Anchorage. Ritchie sought mental health treatment, though the Anchorage Police Department (APD) could not ascertain if he had received a diagnosis.

== Murders ==
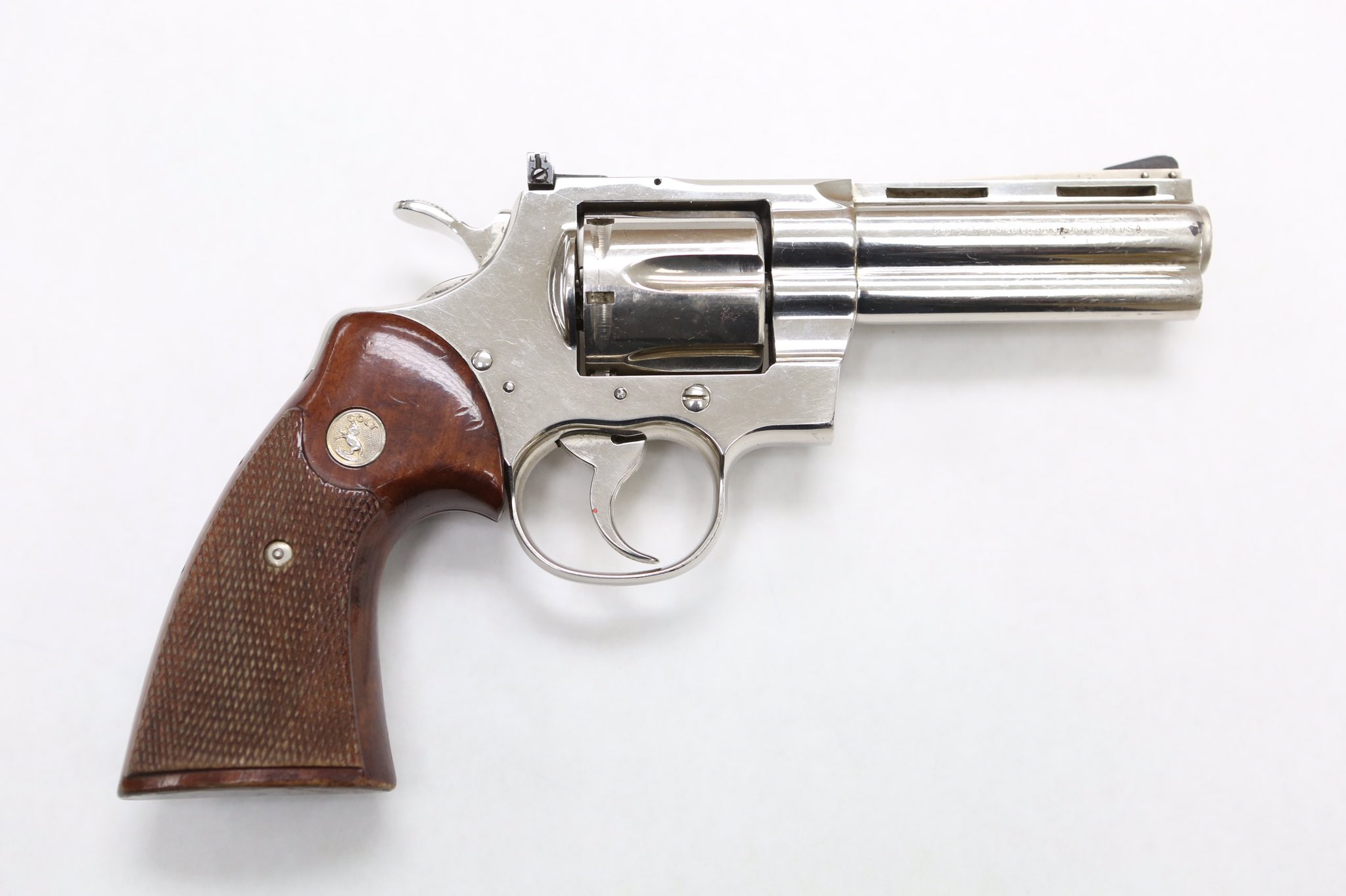
The Colt Python .357 revolver Ritchie used in the serial murders

Ritchie committed his first two murders during the early morning hours of July 3, 2016, when he shot 20-year-old Brianna Foisy and 41-year-old Jason Netter Sr. The two bodies were discovered together along a bike path near Ship Creek by a bicyclist at 7:45 a.m. Netter was noted for having extensive run-ins with the law, often regarding his drug-related activity, as well as child support issues with his two daughters, one of whom changed her name. Foisy was homeless and had fallen into substance abuse, denying intervention by her adoptive mother, Marcella Foisy. The nature of Foisy and Netter's relationship – if any – was not determined or disclosed. On July 5, the murders were ruled a double homicide by the APD. After reviewing hours of surveillance footage, the APD released images of two unidentified men who were persons of interest for the investigation.

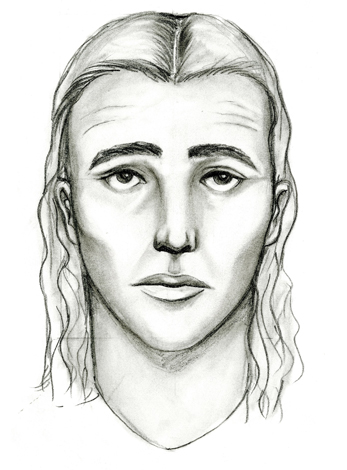
FBI composite sketch of Treyveon-Kindell Thompson's killer, later identified as Ritchie.

The third murder committed by Ritchie took place 26 days later, on July 29. Shortly after 3 a.m., Ritchie shot 21-year-old Treyveon-Kindell Thompson, the son of his childhood friend Bobby Thompson, multiple times while he was riding his bicycle home from work, between Duben Avenue and Bolin Street in East Anchorage. Three girls who had spotted Ritchie lingering in the woods near Bolin Street through their window just prior heard the gunfire and witnessed him grabbing Thompson's bicycle. Ritchie rode the bicycle away from the scene and brought it to his home, where it was observed but not identified as being involved in a crime by witnesses.

The police arrived at Bolin Street, where they found Thompson, who was pronounced dead at the scene shortly after. Under Sergeant Slawomir Markiewicz's direction, witnesses were interviewed and a composite sketch of the suspect – who would later be positively identified as Ritchie – was created. Shortly after Thompson's murder, the Alaska State Crime Lab discretely confirmed that the same murder weapon used in Foisy and Netter's murders was also used in Thompson's murder.

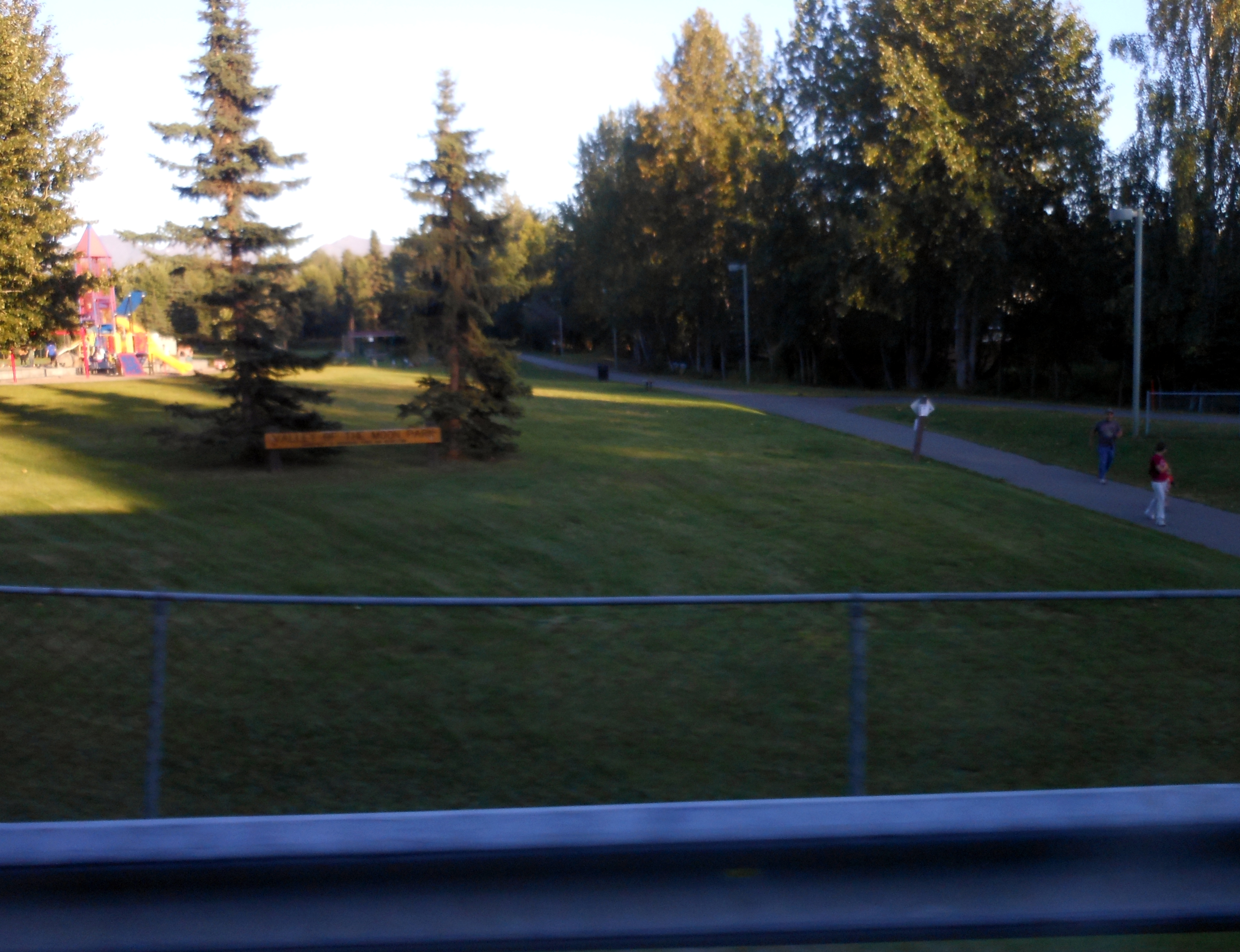
The Valley of the Moon Park, where Kevin Turner and Brie De Husson were murdered.

During the early hours of August 28, Ritchie shot dead 34-year-old Kevin Turner and 25-year-old Bryant (Brie) De Husson in Valley of the Moon Park. An unidentified female passerby who was walking through the park discovered De Husson's body along the trail at 1:42 a.m. Shortly after arriving, police discovered Turner's bullet-riddled body under the pavilion in the park.

Turner, suffering from schizophrenia and bipolar disorder, was homeless at the time, as he had not fared well at assisted living facilities recently. De Husson, a prolific local environmental activist, was thought by their father, Gordon De Husson, to be doing a late-night bicycle ride on their new Schwinn to meet a friend when they happened upon the fatal encounter between Ritchie and Turner. There was no relation between De Husson and Turner. In the police report, the APD noted that very little evidence was left at the scene of the crime. However, the Alaska State Crime Lab confirmed that the weapon used to kill Turner and De Husson had also been used in the earlier homicides.

Recognizing a modus operandi displayed by the string of murders, the APD released an advisory notice for citizens to avoid isolated trails after dark. Following the murders of Turner and De Husson, the FBI was brought on to assist with the investigation. On September 6, Anchorage Mayor Ethan Berkowitz hosted a press conference that asserted that gang violence was largely responsible for the record-breaking number of murders in the city, though he refused to acknowledge the evidence lending credibility to the serial killer theory.

The FBI offered a $10,000 reward leading to the apprehension of the suspect responsible for Thompson's murder, while refusing to comment on any connection to the other murders, due to the concern that acknowledging that a weapon tying all the crimes together would run the risk of prompting the killer to dispose of it. The joint APD and FBI task force subsequently received upwards of 175 tips over the following two months – at least one of which pertained to Ritchie.

Following Thompson's murder, his mother, Mandy Premo, claimed to have conducted an independent investigation to discover her son's killer. She claimed to have located an armed Ritchie near the Alaska Regional Hospital in October 2016 and to have reported to the APD lieutenant about having found her son's killer. She claimed the lieutenant advised against confronting Ritchie personally, as he was armed and her infant child was in the car.

== Death ==
Ritchie was killed near the corner of 5th Avenue and Cordova Street in Anchorage during a gunfight with 38-year-old Officer Arn Salao and 34-year-old Sergeant Marc Patzke of the APD on November 12, 2016. Officer Salao, while responding to an unrelated report of unpaid taxi cab fares, spotted Ritchie walking down the street at 4:30 a.m. Salao pulled up alongside Ritchie and asked for him to stop, presumably to ask him if he had witnessed the crime. Ritchie continued walking, prompting Salao to repeat the question over his megaphone.

Without warning, Ritchie turned, walked towards Salao's vehicle, drew his Colt Python and opened fire on Salao, hitting him six times, which resulted in damage to his bones, intestines and liver. Salao exited his patrol car and returned fire while also engaging Ritchie in a physical confrontation. Simultaneously, Sergeant Patzke of the K9 Unit spotted the confrontation and fired upon Ritchie, who was killed by a number of gunshot wounds. Salao was taken to an area hospital, where he was moved out of the intensive care unit after seven hours of surgery.

== Aftermath ==
Following Ritchie's death, the Colt Python on his person was sent to the Alaska Crime Lab, where it was confirmed to have been the murder weapon responsible for the deaths of Brianna Foisy, Jason Netter Sr., Treyveon-Kindell Thompson, Kevin Turner and Bryant De Husson. The investigative task force had not considered Ritchie a suspect, due to his lack of run-ins with the law over the decade prior.

After seventy-eight hours of investigation and contacting the victims' families, APD Chief Chris Tolley hosted a press conference in which he announced the connection between the homicides and the attempt on Officer Salao's life. Additionally, Lieutenant John McKinnon confirmed that the investigation had revealed a connection between the murders, but the task force withheld it from the public out of concern that Ritchie would have disposed of the Colt Python had he realized it was being sought. The weapon, which had been purchased in 1971, was not registered to Ritchie; the original owner was questioned by the APD, with the intent of discovering how it found its way into Ritchie's possession.

Ritchie was immediately identified as being the assailant responsible for Thompson's murder, due to the witnesses and the identification of his photo identification matching the composite sketch. While the APD continued to collect evidence implicating Ritchie's involvement in the other homicides tied to the Colt Python, the FBI looked to trace Ritchie's activities in Virginia and Nevada prior to returning to Alaska in 2016.

On April 26, 2017, APD spokesperson Renee Oistad announced that sufficient probable cause was determined to confirm that Ritchie was solely responsible for the five murders and, therefore, a serial killer. Investigators had traced the Colt Python handgun's whereabouts back to confirm that it had found its way into Ritchie's possession prior to the murders of Foisy and Netter in July 2016. With Oistad's announcement, the cases were closed. A month later, on May 23, the Anchorage Police Department released dashcam footage recorded just prior to Ritchie and Salao's confrontation, as well as details pertaining to Ritchie's personal history.

== Victims ==
Through ballistics, Ritchie's Colt Python was connected with four crime scenes that include two double homicides, one homicide and the attempted murder of a police officer. The victims include:

- Brianna Foisy, 20, and Jason Netter Sr., 41: shot and killed on July 3, 2016, along a bike path near Ship Creek, west of N Post Road and Viking Drive, east of Anchorage. Coordinates: 61°13′21.3″N 149°51′37.8″W
- Treyveon-Kindell Bobby Dwayne Thompson, 21: shot and killed on Bolin Street on July 29, 2016, in East Anchorage. Coordinates: 61°13′14.0″N 149°43′10.1″W
- Kevin S. Turner, 34, and Bryant C. De Husson, 25: shot and killed on August 28, 2016, at Valley of the Moon Park, in Downtown Anchorage. Coordinates: 61°12′16.2″N 149°53′27.9″W
- Officer Arn Salao, 38: shot and wounded on November 12, 2016, at 5th Street and Cordova Street, in Downtown Anchorage. Salao and Sergeant Marc Patzke returned fire and killed Ritchie. Coordinates: 61°13′03.2″N 149°52′45.2″W

== See also ==
- List of serial killers in the United States
