= Tikahtnu Commons =

Coordinates: 61°13′39″N 149°44′46″W

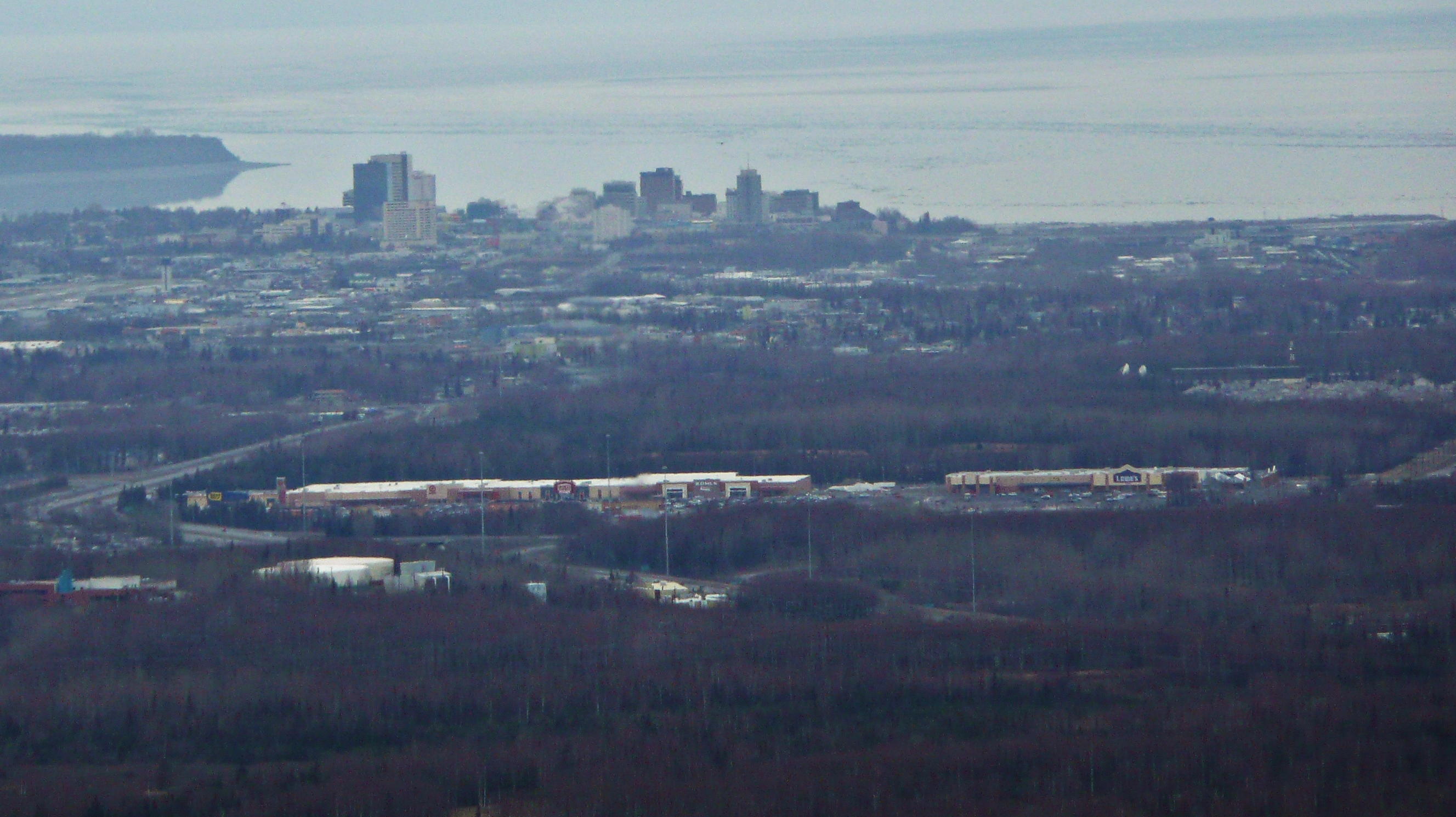
- Skyline of northern Anchorage, showing the area between Chester Creek and Ship Creek, as viewed from Arctic Valley in the Chugach Mountains in April 2009. The beginning stages of Tikahtnu Commons is in the foreground, with the Best Buy, Target, Sports Authority, Kohl's and Lowe's stores visible. Downtown Anchorage, Knik Arm and Merrill Field are in the background.
- Location: Anchorage, Alaska, United States
- Address: 1299 North Muldoon Road, Anchorage, AK 99504
- Developer: Browman Development Company, Inc.
- Owner: CIRI
- Num. of anchor tenants: 9
- Floor area: 900,000 square feet (84,000 m^{2})

Tikahtnu Commons is a 900,000 square foot power center located on a 95-acre parcel in Anchorage, Alaska, United States. It is owned by Cook Inlet Region, Inc., an Alaska Native corporation and Browman Development Company, a California corporation. The shopping center consists of several large anchor stores, dozens of smaller restaurants, shops and services, and a 16-screen Regal Cinemas theater. Tikahtnu is the word for Cook Inlet in the Dena'ina language.

Tikahtnu Commons is home to many firsts for Alaska, including the state's first Kohl's, PetSmart and IMAX theater. It is the largest shopping center in the state and is even large by national comparison. The International Council of Shopping Centers states that power centers in the United States typically range from 250,000 to 600,000 square feet (23,000 to 56,000 m^{2}) with an average of 420,160 square feet (39,034 m^{2}). Construction of the center began in 2007 and by the summer of 2015, it had been developed to roughly 98% capacity. Anchors include Lowe's, Old Navy, PetSmart, Kohl's, Burlington, Target, Best Buy, Regal Cinemas, and Costco Business Center.

Tikahtnu Commons sits just 3 miles east of Glenn Square, which is another power center that was developed concurrently on the same stretch of freeway.

== History ==
The northern portion of Muldoon Road evolved into one of the Anchorage area's major retail districts during the 1960s and 1970s, mainly due to the neighborhood's proximity to Elmendorf Air Force Base and Fort Richardson (which merged in 2010 to form Joint Base Elmendorf–Richardson. The tract of land on which Tikahtnu Commons sits was previously a part of Elmendorf Air Force Base. This tract and other military lands in the northeast corner of the "Anchorage bowl" were ceded to Cook Inlet Region as part of its entitlement under the Alaska Native Claims Settlement Act; a tract to the east was developed as Alaska Native Heritage Center. Cook Inlet Region operated this tract as the Anchorage RV Park for over a decade before redeveloping it as a shopping area.

A number of factors influenced the development of Tikahtnu Commons. The Muldoon Road retail district had greatly expanded during the late 20th and early 21st century as a result of the construction of a Fred Meyer store at the intersection of Muldoon with DeBarr Road, Walmart's purchase of the property of a defunct construction company to the west of Fred Meyer, plus the redevelopment of the large Alaskan Village mobile home park to the south of those two properties into the Muldoon Town Center, including Begich Middle School. The location of Tikahtnu Commons along the Glenn Highway was also designed to attract shoppers from along the highway's corridor, owing to the failure of Eagle River's Valley River Center and Wasilla's Cottonwood Creek Mall. Both malls were crippled by Safeway's acquisition of competing chain Carrs Quality Centers and subsequent moves of those community's Safeway stores out of those malls and into existing Carrs locations. The Valley River Center was redeveloped as Eagle River's Town Center, while the Cottonwood Creek Mall was demolished and replaced with a Target store. The replacement of the Elmendorf Air Force Base hospital and relocation of Anchorage's VA facilities to a site next door, coupled with Joint Base Elmendorf–Richardson's Joint Military Mall approximately 1 mile (1.6 km) to the west, has also made this portion of Anchorage a destination for military, dependents and veterans, many of whom live in east Anchorage and in communities along the Glenn Highway.

Tikahtnu Commons has replaced the Northway Mall and surrounding area as east Anchorage's major shopping district; Red Robin and Sam's Club, among others, have closed their east Anchorage locations just to reopen at Tikahtnu Commons. This repeats a pattern of decades prior, when the development of the Northway Mall and adjacent properties during the 1980s eclipsed the retail district along Mountain View Drive. The Mountain View neighborhood boomed primarily during the 1950s and 1960s when Mountain View Drive served as the western end of the Glenn Highway, prior to the construction of the present-day freeway. The Regal Cinemas also replaced the Fireweed Theatre in the northeast corner of midtown Anchorage, which opened in 1965, itself replacing cinemas in downtown Anchorage which were damaged or destroyed during the 1964 earthquake. The Fireweed Theatre closed in 2010 and was subsequently demolished; Cook Inlet Region redeveloped the property at the same time as it was finishing development of Tikahtnu Commons.

Tikahtnu Commons sits just off the busy Glenn Highway at its intersection with Muldoon Road. The increased traffic drawn by the center has created concerns with the interchange of the two roads, which was built in the 1970s. North Muldoon Road, formerly Oilwell Road, is used as the primary access to the shopping center, Bartlett High School, the Alaska Native Heritage Center and also leads to one of the gates of Joint Base Elmendorf–Richardson. A new interchange was constructed in 2016. The Sam's Club closed in 2018 when all of the Sam's Club locations in Alaska were closed. In 2022, Costco announced plans to remodel the former Sam's Club building to become Alaska's first Costco Business Center.
