= Glenn Square =

- Location: Anchorage, Alaska, United States
- Coordinates: 61°13′14″N 149°48′56″W
- Address: 3200 Mountain View Drive
- Developer: P.O’B Montgomery & Company
- Owner: JL Properties
- Anchor tenants: 4
- Floor area: 250,000 square feet (23,000 m^{2})

Glenn Square is a 250,000 square foot power center located on a 25-acre parcel in the Mountain View neighborhood of Anchorage, Alaska, United States. The center consists of a collection of small shops and eateries and several large anchor stores; the most prominent being an 80,000 ft^{2} Bass Pro Shops Outpost. The center's name is derived from the Glenn Highway, whose western terminus is near the southern property line. It sits across the Glenn Highway from and supplements the Northway Mall, a central shopping area in Anchorage since its development during the early 1980s.

== History ==
The center was developed by P.O’B Montgomery & Company (now Benchmark Opportunity Partners LLC.) after purchasing the land from the Municipality of Anchorage. The city had formed the Anchorage Community Development Authority (ACDA) in 2005 to negotiate the sale of municipal lands without the usual process involving the city council. The ACDA made the sale for very little profit considering the cost of cleaning up pollution in the area, to revitalize the neighborhood. During the same time period, urban renewal in Mountain View to the north of the centre saw large-scale construction of new housing, in some cases replacing homes built during the early development of the neighbourhood in the 1940s. To the center's east, Clark Middle School was demolished and a new school building was constructed. The at-grade intersection of the Glenn Highway with Bragaw Street was replaced with an interchange.

Construction of the center spanned the years of 2006 and 2007 but leasing was initially slow. Just a few miles east of the center, construction of the much larger Tikahtnu Commons began in 2007 with the state's first Target store. In the years following, Tikahtnu Commons pulled many potential leases away from Glenn Square and in 2011 the center was still largely vacant. A major aspect of the center's plans was a 12 screen Century Theater which was to be the chain's second Anchorage location, but when plans for competitor Regal Cinemas to build a 16 screen multiplex at Tikahtnu Commons were discovered, the company pulled out, which was a major blow to the project. With the 2014 opening of Bass Pro Shops however, the shopping center has seen an upswing in popularity and an influx of new businesses.

Glenn Square was purchased by JL Properties from Kimco Reality Corp. in October 2014.
