= Mark Smith (American football) =

American football player (1974–2026)

No. 93, 74
- Position: Defensive tackle

Personal information
- Born: August 28, 1974; Vicksburg, Mississippi, U.S.
- Died: February 10, 2026 (aged 51); Vicksburg, Mississippi, U.S.
- Listed height: 6 ft 4 in (1.93 m)
- Listed weight: 294 lb (133 kg)

Career information
- High school: Vicksburg
- College: Auburn
- NFL draft: 1997: 7th round, 212th overall pick

Career history
- Arizona Cardinals (1997–2000); Cleveland Browns (2001–2002)

Career NFL statistics
- Tackles: 199
- Sacks: 20
- Fumble recoveries: 2
- Stats at Pro Football Reference

Mark Smith (August 28, 1974 – February 10, 2026) was an American professional football player who played defensive tackle in the National Football League (NFL). He played college football for the Auburn Tigers.

== College career ==
Smith began his college career playing at Navarro College in Corsicana, Texas, for a season. He then transferred to Hinds Community College in Raymond, Mississippi for his sophomore season, where earned NJCAA All-America honors while leading Hinds to the 1994 Mississippi state championship. He wrapped up his college career with two seasons at Auburn University.

== Professional career ==
Smith was selected by the Arizona Cardinals in the seventh round of the 1997 NFL draft. He earned All-Rookie honors that season and spent four years on the Cardinals. In his second season with Arizona, he finished second on the team with nine sacks as the Cardinals made it to the second round of the playoffs.

He later played parts of two seasons for the Cleveland Browns, before retiring after being released during the 2002 season.

== Death ==
Smith died on February 10, 2026 at the age of 51.

== Honors ==
Smith was inducted into the Vicksburg-Warren School District Athletics Hall of Fame and the Hinds Hall of Fame in 2024.

== NFL career statistics ==
Legend
**Bold**	Career high

=== Regular season ===
Year	Team	Games		Tackles				Interceptions				Fumbles			
Year	Team	GP	GS	Comb	Solo	Ast	Sck	Int	Yds	TD	Lng	FF	FR	Yds	TD
1997	ARI	16	4	38	26	12	6.0	0	0	0	0	**1**	0	0	0
1998	ARI	14	13	**72**	**52**	**20**	**9.0**	0	0	0	0	**1**	**1**	0	0
1999	ARI	2	0	4	4	0	0.0	0	0	0	0	0	0	0	0
2000	ARI	14	7	44	37	7	3.0	0	0	0	0	0	0	0	0
2001	CLE	16	11	39	27	12	2.0	0	0	0	0	0	**1**	0	0
2002	CLE	5	0	2	2	0	0.0	0	0	0	0	0	0	0	0
		67	35	199	148	51	20.0	0	0	0	0	2	2	0	0

=== Playoffs ===
Year	Team	Games		Tackles				Interceptions				Fumbles			
Year	Team	GP	GS	Comb	Solo	Ast	Sck	Int	Yds	TD	Lng	FF	FR	Yds	TD
1998	ARI	2	2	3	3	0	0.0	0	0	0	0	0	0	0	0
		2	2	3	3	0	0.0	0	0	0	0	0	0	0	0
