= Mao Tosi =

American Samoan gridiron football player (born 1976)

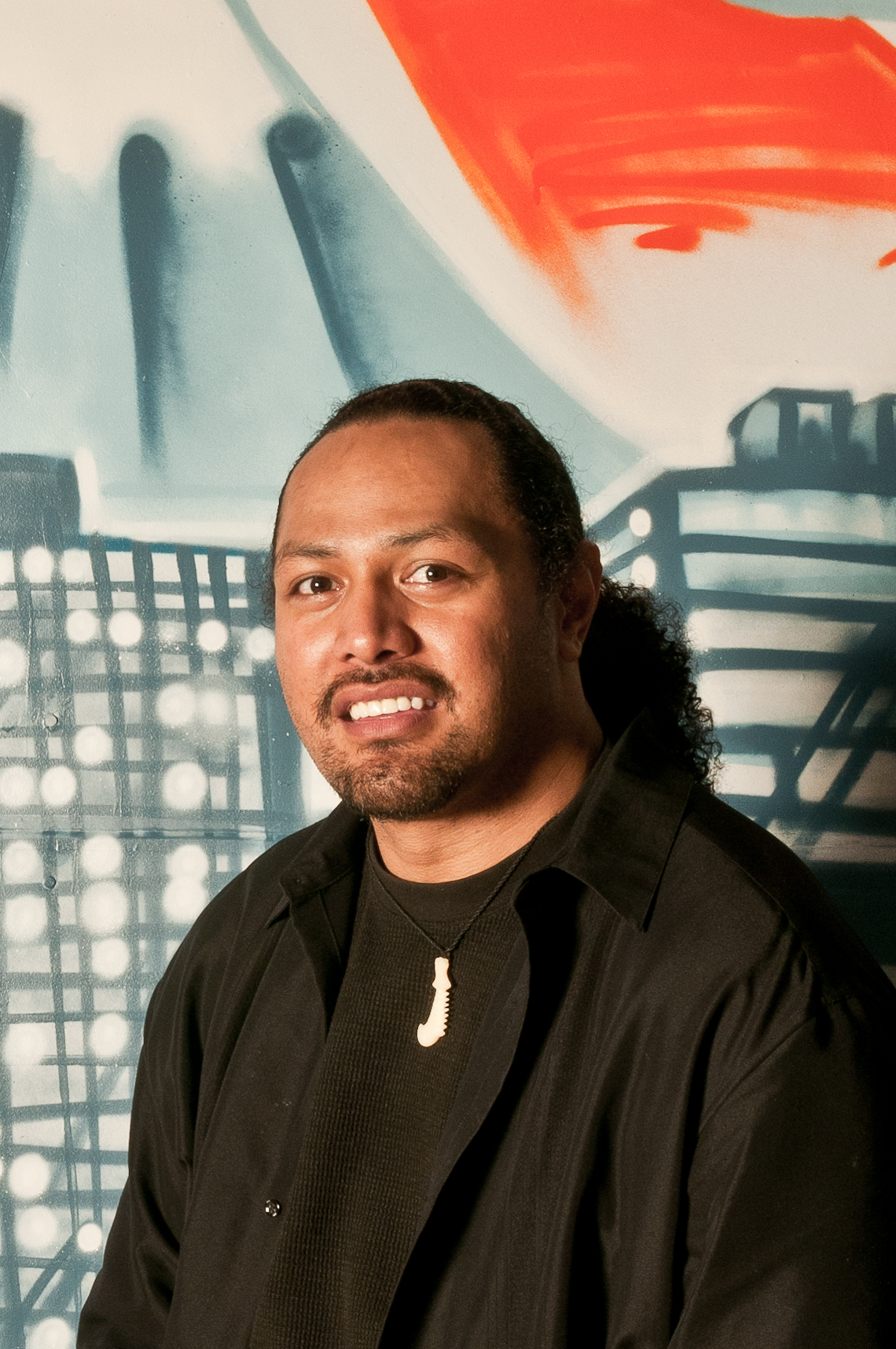
- Tosi in 2011

No. 78
- Position: Defensive tackle

Personal information
- Born: December 12, 1976 (age 49); Manuʻa District, American Samoa
- Listed height: 6 ft 6 in (1.98 m)
- Listed weight: 341 lb (155 kg)

Career information
- High school: East Anchorage (Anchorage, Alaska, U.S.)
- College: Butler CC (1996–1997), Idaho (1998–1999)
- NFL draft: 2000: 5th round, 136th overall pick

Career history
- Arizona Cardinals (2000–2001)

Career NFL statistics
- Tackles: 90
- Sacks: 1
- Forced Fumbles: 1
- Stats at Pro Football Reference

Falemao "Mao" Tosi (born December 12, 1976) is a former American football player, a defensive tackle for two seasons in the National Football League (NFL). He is the only Samoan to date to be named Alaska's high school basketball player of the year.

== Early life ==
Born in Manuʻa District, American Samoa, he moved with his family at age three to San Diego, California, and to Anchorage, Alaska, about a decade later. When his parents returned to San Diego, he stayed in Anchorage with an older brother. At East Anchorage High School, he starred in basketball for the Thunderbirds with teammate Trajan Langdon.

== College ==
After graduation from high school in 1995, Tosi received a basketball scholarship to Butler Community College in El Dorado, Kansas, northeast of Wichita. The Grizzlies were ranked #1 in the country during the 1996–97 season, and finished third in the NJCAA Tourney during the 1995–96 season.

He received a scholarship to play basketball at the University of Idaho in Moscow, where he excelled as a dual-sport athlete, also playing football for the Vandals at defensive tackle in 1998 and 1999. In 1998, Idaho won the Big West Conference title and upset Southern Mississippi in the Humanitarian Bowl in Boise and finished with a 9–3 record. The next year, the Vandals were 7–3 entering the final game against rival Boise State for the conference title, but Tosi was kept out by the medical staff due to a neck stinger, and the Vandals were soundly defeated.

== Pro football ==
At the 2000 NFL draft, he was selected in the fifth round (136th) by the Arizona Cardinals, where he started ten games as a rookie and led the defensive line in tackles. Injured in his third season in 2002, and was diagnosed with a genetic defect in his neck, spinal stenosis, which ended his playing career.

== NFL career statistics ==
Legend
**Bold**	Career high

Year	Team	Games		Tackles					Interceptions					Fumbles			
Year	Team	GP	GS	Cmb	Solo	Ast	Sck	TFL	Int	Yds	TD	Lng	PD	FF	FR	Yds	TD
2000	ARI	**15**	**10**	**66**	**52**	**14**	0.0	1	0	0	0	0	0	0	0	0	0
2001	ARI	11	1	24	17	7	**1.0**	**4**	0	0	0	0	0	**1**	0	0	0
		26	11	90	69	21	1.0	5	0	0	0	0	0	1	0	0	0

== After football ==
Tosi moved back to Alaska to raise his young family. In 2006, Tosi founded AK P.R.I.D.E. (Alaskan People Representing Integrity and Diverse Experiences) to combat gang activity and help teenagers. In 2014 he ran unsuccessfully for the Anchorage Assembly, coming in third behind winner Pete Petersen and incumbent Adam Trombley.

He began working as the general manager of Northway Mall in East Anchorage; he announced it would close in 2020.
