= Steve J. Langdon =

American anthropologist

Steve J. Langdon (born 1948) is an American anthropologist noted for his work with the Tlingit people of southeastern Alaska.

He received his Ph.D. in anthropology from Stanford University in 1977.

He has taught anthropology at the University of Alaska Anchorage since 1976.

Langdon is the father of basketball executive Trajan Langdon.

== Bibliography ==
- Langdon, Steve J. (2002) The Native People of Alaska. Wizard Works.
- Menzies, Charles R. (ed.) (2006) Traditional Ecological Knowledge and Natural Resource Management. Lincoln: University of Nebraska Press.
