= Bettye Davis East Anchorage High School =

Location
- 4025 East Northern Lights Boulevard; Anchorage, Alaska 99508; United States
- Coordinates: 61°12′02″N 149°48′20″W

Information
- Other name: East High School
- Former name: East Anchorage High School
- Type: Public high school
- Established: 1954 (72 years ago)
- School district: Anchorage School District
- Superintendent: Jharrett Bryantt
- CEEB code: 020002
- Principal: Ron Brown
- Teaching staff: 85.75 (FTE)
- Grades: 9-12
- Enrollment: 1,681 (2023–2024)
- Student to teacher ratio: 19.60
- Colors: Red and blue
- Mascot: Thunderbird
- Website: www.asdk12.org/east

Bettye Davis East Anchorage High School (BDEAHS) is a public high school which serves grades 9–12 in Anchorage, Alaska, United States. It is part of the Anchorage School District. The current principal is Ron Brown. East's mascot is the Thunderbird, and the school colors are red and blue. With an enrollment of 1,765 students as of the 2019–2020 school year, East High School is the second largest school in Alaska, after West Anchorage High School, which enrolled 1,772 students in the same school year. In October 2020, it was decided by the Anchorage School District Board to rename East Anchorage High School as Bettye Davis East Anchorage High School after the late Bettye Davis.

== Notable alumni ==
- Don Clary (1975), long distance runner and Olympian
- Scott Gomez (ca. 1997), former National Hockey League player who was also an assistant coach for the New York Islanders
- Trajan Langdon (1994), former professional basketball player with the Cleveland Cavaliers and current president of basketball operations of the Detroit Pistons
- Sean Parnell (1980), former Governor of Alaska
- Kikkan Randall (2001), Olympic skier
- Lora Reinbold (1982), Alaska politician
- James Dale Ritchie (1994), serial killer
- John Roderick (ca. 1986), musician
- Mao Tosi (1995), football player, Arizona Cardinals (ca. 2000)
- Aiden Williams (2019), football player, Pittsburgh Steelers (ca. 2025)
