= Northway Mall (Anchorage, Alaska) =

Defunct mall in the United States

Coordinates: 61.217°N 149.820°W

- Location: Anchorage, Alaska, United States
- Address: 3101 Penland Parkway
- Opened: April 1980; 46 years ago
- Closed: September 30, 2020; 6 years ago (interior only)
- Owner: Benderson Development

Northway Mall, rebranded in the 2020s as North Point, is a shopping mall in Anchorage, Alaska. First opened in 1980, the mall declined in popularity as other malls opened and consumers turned to online shopping; the mall was purchased by Security National Properties in the early 2000s and begun to focus on local Anchorage businesses, rather than chains.

However, recession in Alaska and the COVID-19 pandemic led to further losses. Interior tenants were evicted in 2020, and in 2023 the roof partially collapsed, leading to the departure of one of the remaining two stores. Northway Mall was sold to Benderson Development in 2023, which partially demolished the central area and converted it to a shopping center with a few, free-standing stores.

== Overview ==
Northway Mall is located at 3101 Penland Parkway, in Anchorage, Alaska, just off the Glenn Highway and Airport Heights Drive. It is situated near Anchorage airport Merrill Field, and the flightpath for the east-west runway is over the mall. In 2005 and 2025, small airplanes landing at Merrill Field crashed in the Northway Mall parking lot; neither incident resulted in fatalities or serious injuries.

The site is 30 acres and, following redistricting in the 2020s, is technically in North Anchorage. At opening, it was the largest mall in the state of Alaska and remains of the oldest in the city.

== History ==
=== Opening ===
Northway Mall was built with funding from the Seattle-based Rainier Fund. The first store, a Pay 'n Save, opened on April 30, 1980. Built for 62 stores, including the anchors Carrs, Lamonts, and Pay 'n Save, it was the most expensive mall in Alaska. Rainer Fund was loaned $25 million to pay for construction by Aetna.

The owners filed for bankruptcy in 1991.

=== 2000s and 2010s ===
The mall continued to decline as Alaska went through a recession and consumers turned to online shopping. While, when the mall had opened, over half of Anchorage adults had shopped there, by 2000, that percentage had dropped to around 30; this information is according to a survey by Belden Associates. National chain stores left in the 21st century, occupancy was at 60% and the construction of nearby shopping centers Glenn Square and Tikahtnu Commons brought competition. Northway was purchased by Security National Properties in the early 2000s, a firm that specialized in buying poorly performing retail sites. The mall switched its focus to small, niche businesses, and in March 2011 hired former NFL player Mao Tosi to work as its manager. He attempted to add community events to the mall and rent dropped to $1 per square foot. New anchor stores Planet Fitness and Burlington moved in, increasing foot traffic and attracting smaller, local stores; by 2012, the mall was 90% occupied.

The mall was heavily impacted by the COVID-19 pandemic. In spring 2020, two of the remaining anchor stores, Carrs Safeway and JoAnn Fabrics, closed. In August 2020, the owners closed the common area and interior businesses were served eviction notices. Exterior facing businesses remained open.

=== Demolition and rebranding as North Point ===
When responding to a gas leak, firefighters discovered a partial roof collapse at the mall in March 2023. The mall, like several other Anchorage buildings that winter, had wooden trusses which had been damaged from heavy snow loads. Following the roof collapse, Planet Fitness left the mall. Now with only one open store, by summer, Northway Mall was used as an illegal dumping ground for residential waste and disused household appliances. It was sold to Benderson Development, a Florida company, later that year; the company removed the trash and began demolishing the center areas of the mall in August 2024, leaving a few, free-standing stores such as an O'Reilly Auto Parts. Benderson Development rebranded the mall as North Point, though still referred to it as Northway Mall.
