= Sean Keenan (American football) =

American football player (born 1977)

No. 10
- Position: Quarterback

Personal information
- Born: January 2, 1977 (age 49)
- Listed height: 6 ft 3 in (1.91 m)
- Listed weight: 209 lb (95 kg)

Career information
- High school: Mount Saint Joseph Academy (Rutland, Vermont)
- College: Williams
- NFL draft: 2000: undrafted

Career history
- Arizona Cardinals (2000); → Amsterdam Admirals (2001)

Sean Keenan (born January 2, 1977) is an American former football quarterback. He played college football for the Williams Ephs and was on the Arizona Cardinals' active roster in 2000.

== Early life ==
Sean Keenan was born on January 2, 1977. He was a "star" in football and basketball at Mount Saint Joseph Academy in Rutland, Vermont. He then spent a postgraduate year at Phillips Exeter Academy in Exeter, New Hampshire, playing football and basketball.

== College career ==
Keenan enrolled at Williams College to play college football for the Ephs from 1996 to 1999. As a sophomore in 1997, he was playing at least one quarter of every game behind starter Peter Supino. Keenan eventually finished his college career with school records in completions, passing attempts, passing yards, and passing touchdowns. In the December 27, 1999, issue of Sports Illustrated, Keenan was ranked 39th on the "The 50 Greatest Sports Figures From Vermont". He impressed NFL scouts due to having a strong and accurate arm, quick release, and being able to read defenses well.

Keenan was also a team co-captain in basketball. He was noted as a "defensive specialist" for the Ephs basketball team. He helped the Ephs to a 97–16 overall record and two third-place finishes in the NCAA Division III men's basketball tournament.

== Professional career ==
Keenan was the first Ephs player ever invited to the NFL Combine. He signed with the Arizona Cardinals after going undrafted in the 2000 NFL draft. He was released on August 20 but signed to the team's practice squad. Keenan was promoted to the active roster on December 15 but did not play in any games during the 2000 NFL season. He re-signed with the Cardinals in February 2001 and was allocated Keenan to NFL Europe to play for the Amsterdam Admirals. He played in seven games for the Admirals during the 2001 NFL Europe season, completing one of one passes for nine yards and being sacked once for 11 yards. Keenan was released by the Cardinals on August 27, 2001, after the third of four preseason games.

== Personal life ==
Keenan was later a vice president at Walsh Duffield Companies.
