= Hensley, West Virginia =

Hensley
- Unincorporated community
- Location within the state of West Virginia Hensley (the United States)
- Coordinates: 37°28′26″N 81°41′59″W
- Country: United States
- State: West Virginia
- County: McDowell
- Time zone: UTC-5 (Eastern (EST))
  - Summer (DST): UTC-4 (EDT)
- ZIP code: 24843

Hensley is an unincorporated community on the Tug Fork River in McDowell County, West Virginia, United States. According to the Geographic Names Information System, Hensley has also been known by the names Claren, Claren Station, and Hensley Claren.
