= Jay Tant =

American football player (born 1977)

No. 87
- Position: Tight end

Personal information
- Born: December 4, 1977 (age 48); Kettering, Ohio, U.S.
- Listed height: 6 ft 3 in (1.91 m)
- Listed weight: 254 lb (115 kg)

Career information
- High school: Archbishop Alter
- College: Northwestern
- NFL draft: 2000: 5th round, 164th overall pick

Career history
- Arizona Cardinals (2000)

Career NFL statistics
- Games: 5
- Receptions: 1
- Receiving yards: 4
- Stats at Pro Football Reference

Jay William Tant (born December 4, 1977) is an American former professional football player who was a tight end for the Arizona Cardinals of the National Football League (NFL). He played college football for the Northwestern Wildcats and was selected in the fifth round of the 2000 NFL draft with the 164th overall pick.
