= Mount Saint Joseph Academy (Rutland, Vermont) =

Location
- 127 Convent Avenue; Rutland, Vermont 05701; United States; 43°36′11″N 72°59′7″W

Information
- Type: Private, Coeducational
- Religious affiliation: Roman Catholic
- Established: 1882
- Status: Open
- Authority: Roman Catholic Diocese of Burlington
- Principal: Michael Audette
- Grades: 9–12
- Enrollment: 100
- Colors: Green and White
- Slogan: "Respect All, Fear None"
- Athletics: Varsity, Junior Varsity
- Athletics conference: Marble Valley
- Sports: Basketball, Soccer, Baseball, Softball, Track & Field, Cross Country, Skiing
- Team name: Mounties, Green Wave
- Rival: Rutland High School
- Accreditation: New England Association of Schools and Colleges (candidate)
- Annual tuition: $3,370
- Alumni: Jason Foster (NFL) Sean Keenan (NFL) Jim Larkin (IHL, ECHL, SHL)
- Athletic Director: Dan Elliott
- Website: http://www.msjvermont.org

Mount Saint Joseph Academy is a Roman Catholic college preparatory high school located in Rutland, Vermont. The school is under the jurisdiction of the Diocese of Burlington.

== History ==
The Academy was started soon after the founding of the Sisters of St. Joseph Rutland community. After they arrived, the sisters began the task of building schools starting with St. Peter's School and, in 1882, the all-girls Mount St. Joseph Academy.

In 1927, the Sisters built a larger facility and opened as a co-educational academy. The academic curriculum remained the same. The advent of boys brought the introduction of a full athletics program. The music program grew to include a marching band and orchestra, with special diplomas offered in piano and violin. Drama was offered.

== Student activities ==
MSJ offers a number of different extra-curricular clubs and societies. These groups include: Student Government, National Honor Society, National Art Honor Society, National History Day, Yearbook Committee, Scholar's Bowl, and Soles of the Shoestring Theater.

== Athletics ==
Sports include soccer, basketball, baseball, and cross country.
