= Trajan Langdon =

American basketball executive and former player (born 1976)

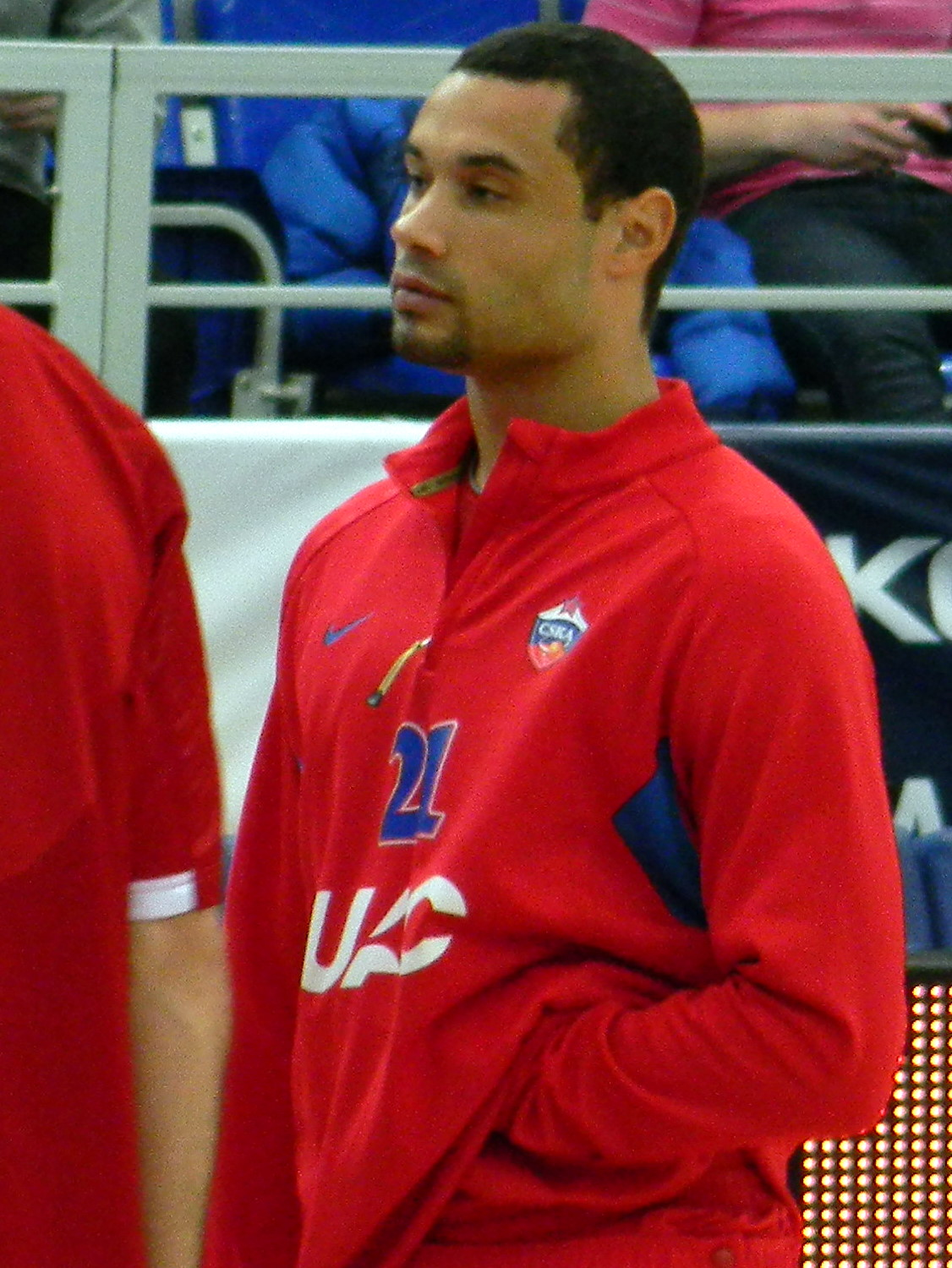
- Langdon with CSKA Moscow in 2011

Detroit Pistons
- Title: President of basketball operations
- League: NBA

Personal information
- Born: May 13, 1976 (age 50) Palo Alto, California, U.S.
- Listed height: 6 ft 4 in (1.93 m)
- Listed weight: 211 lb (96 kg)

Career information
- High school: East Anchorage (Anchorage, Alaska)
- College: Duke (1994–1999)
- NBA draft: 1999: 1st round, 11th overall pick
- Drafted by: Cleveland Cavaliers
- Playing career: 1999–2011
- Position: Shooting guard
- Number: 21

Career history
- 1999–2002: Cleveland Cavaliers
- 2002–2003: Benetton Treviso
- 2003: Long Beach Jam
- 2003–2004: Efes Pilsen
- 2004–2005: Dynamo Moscow
- 2005–2011: CSKA Moscow

Career highlights
- As player: 2× EuroLeague champion (2006, 2008); EuroLeague Final Four MVP (2008); 2× All-EuroLeague First Team (2007, 2008); All-EuroLeague Second Team (2006); EuroLeague 2000–2010 All-Decade Team (2010); 2× EuroLeague 50–40–90 club (2007, 2010); 6× Russian League champion (2006–2011); Turkish League champion (2004); Lega Serie A champion (2003); Italian Cup winner (2003); 3× Russian Cup winner (2006, 2007, 2010); Italian Super Cup winner (2002); Russian League MVP (2008); All-Russian League Second Team (2009); Consensus second-team All-American (1999); Second-team All-American – SN (1998); Third-team All-American – AP, USBWA, NABC (1998); 3× First-team All-ACC (1997–1999); McDonald's All-American (1994); Second-team Parade All-American (1994)
- Stats at NBA.com
- Stats at Basketball Reference
Medals
Men's basketball
Representing United States
FIBA World Cup
Bronze medal – third place	1998 Athens
FIBA Americas U18 Championship
Gold medal – first place	1994 Santa Rosa	Under-18

Trajan Shaka Langdon (born May 13, 1976) is an American basketball executive and former professional player. He is the current president of basketball operations for the Detroit Pistons of the National Basketball Association (NBA). A 6 ft 4 in (1.93 m) and 211 lb (96 kg) shooting guard, he first gained fame in the U.S. while playing college basketball at Duke University.

Following a three-year NBA stint, Langdon had a successful career in Europe. A three-time All-EuroLeague Team member and the EuroLeague Final Four MVP in 2008, he won two EuroLeague titles with CSKA Moscow in 2006 and 2008.

In March 2016, he was named the assistant general manager of the Brooklyn Nets, serving in the role until May 2019, when he was named the general manager of the New Orleans Pelicans. On May 31, 2024, he was hired as President of Basketball Operations by the Detroit Pistons.

== Early career ==
Born in Palo Alto, California, Langdon moved to Anchorage, Alaska soon after. During his high school career, Langdon attended Steller Secondary School, and played with East Anchorage High School. He set the Alaska 4A state record of 2,200 career points scored, and was a 3-time Alaskan State Player of the Year.

He led East Anchorage to the 1994 Alaskan State Championship, and he played in the McDonald's All-American Game, where he won the 3-point shooting contest.

Langdon also played high school baseball. Although his seasons were only twelve games long, as a senior he hit .333 with four home runs and 12 RBI. In the league championship game, he gave up only four hits and struck out eleven batters.

== College career ==
After high school, Langdon moved on to play NCAA Division I college basketball at Duke, where he set the school record for the most career 3-point field goals made (which was broken by JJ Redick in 2006), earning him the nickname, "The Alaskan Assassin". A major knee injury kept him sidelined for his entire sophomore year, so he finished his college career as a fifth year guard.

In the 1999 NCAA Men's Division I Basketball Tournament championship game, with Duke down 1 point to the UConn Huskies, with 5.4 seconds to go in the game, Langdon attempted to drive the ball into the lane, and committed a traveling violation that turned the ball over to UConn. Analysts, as well as Langdon himself, credited the defense of Ricky Moore, who was considered the top defensive player in the tournament, for forcing the travel.

=== Baseball career ===
A baseball scout discovered Langdon playing catch with his father in the parking lot of their hotel during Langdon's recruiting trip to Duke and was immediately impressed. Langdon was selected in the 6th round of the 1994 Major League Baseball draft out of high school by the San Diego Padres, ahead of such eventual All-Stars as Carl Pavano and Plácido Polanco. At the time he was the highest drafted player ever out of Alaska. He signed with the Padres and received a $230,000 signing bonus. Because NCAA rules at the time prevented a player from receiving a scholarship in one sport while playing another professionally, Langdon had to play basketball at Duke without a scholarship while playing Minor League Baseball during the summer. In three seasons in the minors, he played in 50 games for the Spokane Indians and Idaho Falls Braves.

== Professional career ==
Langdon was selected by the NBA's Cleveland Cavaliers in the 1999 NBA draft. Langdon made his professional debut with the Cavaliers on November 2, 1999, when he became the first Alaskan to play in the NBA. Following a three-year career with the Cavaliers, Langdon moved to Europe to play for the Italian League club Benetton Treviso for the 2002–03 season.

The following season, after being waived by the Los Angeles Clippers in the preseason, he originally signed with and briefly played for the Long Beach Jam before he moved to the Turkish League powerhouse Efes Pilsen. For the 2004–05 season, he moved on to the Russian League club Dynamo Moscow, before moving across town to CSKA Moscow for the 2005–06 season. Langdon was named to the All-EuroLeague Second Team for the 2005–06 season. CSKA won the EuroLeague championship that same season.

The following season, he helped CSKA return to the EuroLeague championship game, where they lost to Greek power Panathinaikos, on the Greek team's home court. (Note: The EuroLeague determines the site for each year's Final Four shortly before the previous year's Final Four, before it can possibly be known who will advance. The 2008 event was held in Madrid.) In the process, he was named to the All-EuroLeague First Team for the 2006–07 season, a feat that he repeated in the 2007–08 season. On May 4, 2008, he was named the EuroLeague Final Four MVP, after again winning the EuroLeague title with CSKA.

On October 7, 2006, Langdon led his CSKA Moscow team to a 94–75 win over the Clippers, in an NBA Europe Live Tour exhibition game. Coincidentally, he played against his former Duke University teammate Elton Brand, who was playing for the Clippers at that time. He led all scorers in the game with 17 points.

In June 2011, he announced his retirement from playing professional basketball. He made his announcement two days after helping CSKA to its ninth consecutive Russian championship.

== National team career ==
After graduating from Duke, with degrees in mathematics and history, Langdon played for the USA national basketball team at the 1998 FIBA World Championship, winning the bronze medal.

== Post-playing career ==
After his playing days ended, Langdon was a scout for the San Antonio Spurs from 2012 to 2015. On March 8, 2016, he was named the assistant general manager of the Brooklyn Nets. On May 19, 2019, Langdon was named the general manager of the New Orleans Pelicans.

On May 31, 2024, Langdon was named President of Basketball Operations for the Detroit Pistons.

== Career statistics ==
Legend
GP	Games played	GS	Games started	MPG	Minutes per game
FG%	Field-goal percentage	3P%	3-point field-goal percentage	FT%	Free-throw percentage
RPG	Rebounds per game	APG	Assists per game	SPG	Steals per game
BPG	Blocks per game	PPG	Points per game	PIR	Performance index rating
**Bold**	Career high

=== NBA ===
==== Regular season ====
Year	Team	GP	GS	MPG	FG%	3P%	FT%	RPG	APG	SPG	BPG	PPG
1999–00	Cleveland	10	0	14.5	.375	**.421**	**1.000**	**1.5**	1.1	.5	.0	4.9
2000–01	Cleveland	**65**	**5**	**17.2**	**.431**	.411	.895	1.4	1.2	**.6**	**.1**	**6.0**
2001–02	Cleveland	44	0	10.8	.398	.365	.913	1.3	**1.4**	.3	**.1**	4.8
Career		119	5	14.6	.416	.396	.910	1.3	1.3	.5	.1	5.4

=== EuroLeague ===
†	Denotes season in which Langdon won the EuroLeague
*	Led the league

Year	Team	GP	GS	MPG	FG%	3P%	FT%	RPG	APG	SPG	BPG	PPG	PIR
2002–03	Treviso	21	19	28.6	**.540**	**.511**	.759	2.7	**1.7**	**1.6**	.1	14.8	13.4
2003–04	Efes	20	19	**33.1**	.461	.391	.864	3.0	1.6	1.5	**.2**	14.3	13.0
2005–06†	CSKA Moscow	24	24	31.8	.453	.390	.860	3.1	1.5	1.3	**.2**	12.8	11.6
2006–07	CSKA Moscow	**25**	**25**	29.5	.475	.420	**.925***	**4.0**	1.0	**1.6**	**.2**	13.5	14.6
2007–08†	CSKA Moscow	**25***	**25***	29.1	.512	.458	.884	3.3	.9	1.2	.1	12.6	13.0
2008–09	CSKA Moscow	21	21*	28.8	.494	.432	.878	2.7	1.3	1.0	—	10.6	11.2
2009–10	CSKA Moscow	21	21	32.2	.505	.470	.913	3.0	1.1	1.4	.0	**15.0**	**15.6**
2010–11	CSKA Moscow	10	9	27.5	.397	.229	.708	2.2	.5	.2	—	8.3	4.5
Career		167	163	30.2	.486	.427	.868	3.1	1.3	1.3	.1	13.0	12.7

== Personal life ==
Langdon is the son of Dr. Steve Langdon, a professor of anthropology at the University of Alaska Anchorage, and social worker Gladys. He traveled with his father on many anthropological trips within southeastern Alaska. His father studied the Indigenous Nation of southeastern Alaska known as the Tlingit Nation.
