= Stipetić =

Origin
- Language: Croatian
- Meaning: "son of Stipe"
- Region of origin: Croatia

Other names
- Variant forms: Stjepanović, Stefanović, Stevanović, Stepanović, Stipanovich, Stepanovich

Stipetić is a Croatian patronymic surname formed by adding the Slavic diminutive suffix -ić to the masculine given name Stipe, a Croatian variant of Stephen, and may refer to:

- Lucki Stipetić, German film producer
- Marijan Stipetić (1930–2011), Croatian swimmer
- Petar Stipetić (1937–2018), Croatian general
- Vladimir Stipetić (1928–2017), Croatian economist and academician
- Werner Herzog (born 1942 as Werner Stipetić), German screenwriter, film director, author, actor, and opera director
