= 2004 Arizona Cardinals season =

NFL team season

- Owner: Bill Bidwill
- General manager: Rod Graves
- Head coach: Dennis Green
- Home stadium: Sun Devil Stadium

Results
- Record: 6–10
- Division place: 3rd NFC West
- Playoffs: Did not qualify
- Pro Bowlers: DE Bertrand Berry

The 2004 season was the Arizona Cardinals' 85th season in the National Football League (NFL), their 106th overall and their 17th in Arizona. The first year under head coach Dennis Green, the team finished with a 6–10 record, an improvement on their 4–12 record from the previous season, and finished in third place in the NFC West, failing to make the playoffs for the sixth straight season. Season lows for the Cardinals included losing two games to the San Francisco 49ers, the only two games the 49ers won in 2004. The Cardinals, during Week 9, also defeated the Miami Dolphins for the first time in franchise history.

The season was notable for drafting wide receiver Larry Fitzgerald with the third overall pick of the draft. At the end of the season, Emmitt Smith retired after 15 years in the league.

== Offseason ==
Additions	Subtractions
QB Shaun King (Buccaneers)	G Pete Kendall (Jets)
CB David Macklin (Colts)	QB Jeff Blake (Eagles)
WR Karl Williams (Buccaneers)	G Chris Dishman (Rams)
	DT Derrick Ransom (Jaguars)
	CB David Barrett (Jets)

=== NFL draft ===
2004 Arizona Cardinals draft
Round	Pick	Player	Position	College	Notes
1	3	Larry Fitzgerald *	Wide receiver	Pittsburgh	
2	33	Karlos Dansby	Linebacker	Auburn	
3	64	Darnell Dockett *	Defensive tackle	Florida State	
4	100	Alex Stepanovich	Center	Ohio State	
5	135	Antonio Smith *	Defensive end	Oklahoma State	
6	167	Nick Leckey	Center	Kansas State	
7	202	John Navarre	Quarterback	Michigan	
Made roster † Pro Football Hall of Fame * Made at least one Pro Bowl during career

=== Undrafted free agents ===
2004 undrafted free agents of note
Player	Position	College
Romby Bryant	Wide receiver	Tulsa
Larry Croom	Running back	UNLV
Clarence Curry	Cornerback	Villanova
Eric Edwards	Tight end	LSU
Matt Fordyce	Kicker	Fordham
Chris Lewis	Quarterback	Stanford
Adrian Mayes	Safety	LSU
Tyrone Sanders	Cornerback	TCU
Rolando Cantú	Guard	ITESM

=== Pat Tillman ===
On April 22, 2004, former Cardinals safety Pat Tillman was killed in a friendly fire incident while on patrol. Tillman was the first professional football player to be killed in combat since the death of Bob Kalsu of the Buffalo Bills, who died in the Vietnam War in 1970. Tillman was posthumously laterally promoted from Specialist to Corporal. He also received posthumous Silver Star and Purple Heart medals. On Sunday, September 19, 2004, all teams of the NFL wore a memorial decal on their helmets in Tillman's honor. The Cardinals continued to wear this decal throughout the 2004 season.

== Personnel ==
2004 Arizona Cardinals staff
Front office: President – Bill Bidwill; Vice president and general counsel – Michael Bidwill; Vice president of football operations – Rod Graves; Senior director of football operations – John Idzik, Jr.; Head coaches: Head coach – Dennis Green; Offensive coaches: Offensive coordinator – Alex Wood; Quarterbacks – Mike Kruczek; Running backs – Kirby Wilson; Wide receivers – Robert Ford; Tight ends – Mike Wilson; Offensive line – Bob Wylie; Offensive quality control – Bill Khayat; Offensive consultant – Carl Hargrave	Defensive coaches: Defensive coordinator – Clancy Pendergast; Defensive line – Deek Pollard; Linebackers – Frank Bush; Defensive backs – Richard Solomon; Defensive quality control – Rick Courtright; Special teams coaches: Special teams – Kevin O'Dea; Strength and conditioning: Strength and conditioning – Steve Wetzel; Assistant strength and conditioning – Ryan Capretta; Assistant strength and conditioning – Daryl Lawrence

== Roster ==
2004 Arizona Cardinals roster
Quarterbacks (QB): 4 Shaun King; 12 Josh McCown; 16 John Navarre; Running backs (RB): 20 Damien Anderson; 30 Obafemi Ayanbadejo FB; 32 Larry Croom; 33 Josh Scobey; 22 Emmitt Smith; Wide receivers (WR): 81 Anquan Boldin; 11 Larry Fitzgerald; 84 Lawrence Hamilton; 80 Bryant Johnson; 89 Nate Poole; 86 Karl Williams; Tight ends (TE): 83 Eric Edwards; 88 Freddie Jones	Offensive linemen (OL): 73 Jeremy Bridges G; 65 Anthony Clement RT; 60 Nick Leckey C; 66 Alan Reuber G; 76 Cameron Spikes G; 71 Alex Stepanovich C; 74 Reggie Wells G; Defensive linemen (DL): 92 Bertrand Berry DE; 91 Wendell Bryant DT; 98 Russell Davis DT; 90 Darnell Dockett DT; 72 Ross Kolodziej DT; 97 Calvin Pace DE; 67 Antonio Smith DE; 93 Kyle Vanden Bosch DE; 94 Peppi Zellner DE	Linebackers (LB): 58 Karlos Dansby OLB; 51 James Darling OLB; 54 Gerald Hayes MLB; 59 Leon Joe OLB; 53 Isaac Keys OLB; 57 Ronald McKinnon MLB; 55 Raynoch Thompson OLB; 56 LeVar Woods OLB; Defensive backs (DB): 41 Clarence Curry CB; 29 Quentin Harris FS; 21 Renaldo Hill CB; 27 David Macklin CB; 37 Adrian Mayes SS; 25 Ifeanyi Ohalete FS; 22 Duane Starks CB; 44 Michael Stone CB; 26 Robert Tate CB; 24 Adrian Wilson SS; Special teams (ST): 48 Nathan Hodel LS; 10 Scott Player P; 1 Neil Rackers K	Practice squad: 49 Bobby Blizzard TE; 69 Rolando Cantú G ^{Int'l}; 82 Lorenzo Diamond TE; 15 Chris Lewis QB; 45 Casey Moore FB; 87 Reggie Newhouse WR; 62 Jim Newton LT; 36 Tyrone Sanders CB; Reserve: 75 Leonard Davis LT (IR); 47 Troy Hambrick RB (IR); 42 James Hodgins FB (IR); 95 Kenny King DT (IR); 70 L. J. Shelton RT (IR); 31 Marcel Shipp RB (IR); 97 Fred Wakefield DE (IR); Rookies in italics 53 active, 7 reserve, 8 practice squad

== Regular season ==
=== Schedule ===
In the 2004 regular season, the Cardinals' non-divisional, conference opponents were primarily from the NFC South, although they also played the New York Giants from the NFC East, and the Detroit Lions from the NFC North. Their non-conference opponents were from the AFC East.

Week	Date	Opponent	Result	Record	Venue	Attendance
1	September 12	at **St. Louis Rams**	**L** 10–17	0–1	Edward Jones Dome	65,538
2	September 19	New England Patriots	**L** 12–23	0–2	Sun Devil Stadium	51,557
3	September 26	at Atlanta Falcons	**L** 3–6	0–3	Georgia Dome	70,534
4	October 3	New Orleans Saints	**W** 34–10	1–3	Sun Devil Stadium	28,109
5	October 10	at **San Francisco 49ers**	**L** 28–31 (OT)	1–4	Monster Park	62,836
6	Bye					
7	October 24	**Seattle Seahawks**	**W** 25–17	2–4	Sun Devil Stadium	35,695
8	October 31	at Buffalo Bills	**L** 14–38	2–5	Ralph Wilson Stadium	65,887
9	November 7	at Miami Dolphins	**W** 24–23	3–5	Pro Player Stadium	72,612
10	November 14	New York Giants	**W** 17–14	4–5	Sun Devil Stadium	42,297
11	November 21	at Carolina Panthers	**L** 10–35	4–6	Bank of America Stadium	72,796
12	November 28	New York Jets	**L** 3–13	4–7	Sun Devil Stadium	35,820
13	December 5	at Detroit Lions	**L** 12–26	4–8	Ford Field	62,262
14	December 12	**San Francisco 49ers**	**L** 28–31 (OT)	4–9	Sun Devil Stadium	35,069
15	December 19	**St. Louis Rams**	**W** 31–7	5–9	Sun Devil Stadium	40,070
16	December 26	at **Seattle Seahawks**	**L** 21–24	5–10	Qwest Field	65,825
17	January 2, 2005	Tampa Bay Buccaneers	**W** 12–7	6–10	Sun Devil Stadium	31,650
Note: Intra-division opponents are in **bold** text.

=== Game summaries ===
==== Week 1: at St. Louis Rams ====
Week 1: Arizona Cardinals at St. Louis Rams – Game summary

Quarter	1	2	3	4	Total
Cardinals	0	3	7	0	**10**
**Rams**	0	6	3	8	**17**

at Edward Jones Dome, St. Louis, Missouri

- Date: September 12
- Game time: 12:05 p.m. CST/11:05 a.m. MST
- Game weather: None (Indoor stadium)
- Game attendance: 65,538
- Referee: Bill Carollo
- Box Score

Game information

**First quarter**

- No scoring plays

**Second quarter**

- STL – Jeff Wilkins 50-yard field goal, 11:21. Rams 3–0. **Drive: 7 plays, 35 yards, 3:28.**
- ARI – Neil Rackers 50-yard field goal, 8:10. Tied 3–3. **Drive: 5 plays, 24 yards, 3:11.**
- STL – Jeff Wilkins 28-yard field goal, 2:39. Rams 6–3. **Drive: 11 plays, 74 yards, 5:31.**

**Third quarter**

- STL – Jeff Wilkins 22-yard field goal, 5:50. Rams 9–3. **Drive: 14 plays, 83 yards, 9:10.**
- ARI – Emmitt Smith 11-yard run (Neil Rackers kick), 0:57. Cardinals 10–9. **Drive: 9 plays, 65 yards, 4:53.**

**Fourth quarter**

- STL – Isaac Bruce 8-yard pass from Marc Bulger (Marshall Faulk run), 14:27. Rams 17–10. **Drive: 5 plays, 80 yards, 1:30.**

**Top passers**

- ARI – Josh McCown – 18/29, 181 yards
- STL – Marc Bulger – 23/34, 272 yards, TD, INT

**Top rushers**

- ARI – Emmitt Smith – 16 rushes, 87 yards, TD
- STL – Marshall Faulk – 22 rushes, 128 yards

**Top receivers**

- ARI – Larry Fitzgerald – 4 receptions, 70 yards
- STL – Isaac Bruce – 9 receptions, 112 yards, TD

==== Week 2: vs. New England Patriots ====
Week 2: New England Patriots at Arizona Cardinals – Game summary

Quarter	1	2	3	4	Total
**Patriots**	7	7	3	6	**23**
Cardinals	0	6	6	0	**12**

at Sun Devil Stadium, Tempe, Arizona

- Date: September 19
- Game time: 2:15 p.m. MST
- Game weather: 89 °F (32 °C)
- Game attendance: 51,557
- Referee: Tony Corrente
- Box Score

Game information

**First quarter**

- NE – Daniel Graham 2-yard pass from Tom Brady (Adam Vinatieri kick), 2:11. Patriots 7–0. **Drive: 8 plays, 68 yards, 5:15.**

**Second quarter**

- NE – Daniel Graham 19-yard pass from Tom Brady (Adam Vinatieri kick), 13:16. Patriots 14–0. **Drive: 5 plays, 30 yards, 2:27.**
- ARI – Neil Rackers 51-yard field goal, 8:08. Patriots 14–3. **Drive: 4 plays, -22 yards, 1:54.**
- ARI – Neil Rackers 52-yard field goal, 5:13. Patriots 14–6. **Drive: 4 plays, 8 yards, 2:04.**

**Third quarter**

- NE – Adam Vinatieri 29-yard field goal, 9:21. Patriots 17–6. **Drive: 12 plays, 69 yards, 5:39.**
- ARI – Emmitt Smith 1-yard run (pass failed), 1:33. Patriots 17–12. **Drive: 11 plays, 80 yards, 7:48.**

**Fourth quarter**

- NE – Adam Vinatieri 28-yard field goal, 12:02. Patriots 20–12. **Drive: 9 plays, 69 yards, 4:31.**
- NE – Adam Vinatieri 24-yard field goal, 6:22. Patriots 23–12. **Drive: 7 plays, 44 yards, 3:56.**

**Top passers**

- NE – Tom Brady – 15/26, 219 yards, 2 TD, 2 INT
- ARI – Josh McCown – 13/29, 160 yards, 2 INT

**Top rushers**

- NE – Corey Dillon – 32 rushes, 158 yards
- ARI – Emmitt Smith – 13 rushes, 31 yards, TD

**Top receivers**

- NE – David Givens – 6 receptions, 120 yards
- ARI – Freddie Jones – 4 receptions, 43 yards

==== Week 3: at Atlanta Falcons ====
Week 3: Arizona Cardinals at Atlanta Falcons – Game summary

Quarter	1	2	3	4	Total
Cardinals	0	0	0	3	**3**
**Falcons**	3	3	0	0	**6**

at Georgia Dome, Atlanta, Georgia

- Date: September 26
- Game time: 1:05 p.m. EST/11:05 a.m. MST
- Game weather: None (Indoor stadium)
- Game attendance: 70,534
- Referee: Walt Coleman
- Box Score

Game information

**First quarter**

- ATL – Jay Feely 25-yard field goal, 7:12. Falcons 3–0. **Drive: 7 plays, 73 yards, 3:28.**

**Second quarter**

- ATL – Jay Feely 23-yard field goal, 12:01. Falcons 3–0. **Drive: 6 plays, 34 yards, 2:04.**

**Third quarter**

- No scoring plays

**Fourth quarter**

- ARI – Neil Rackers 30-yard field goal, 9:24. Falcons 6–3. **Drive: 4 plays, 6 yards, 2:11.**

**Top passers**

- ARI – Josh McCown – 20/26, 198 yards
- ATL – Michael Vick – 10/20, 115 yards, INT

**Top rushers**

- ARI – Emmitt Smith – 18 rushes, 45 yards
- ATL – Warrick Dunn – 20 rushes, 117 yards

**Top receivers**

- ARI – Karl Williams – 6 receptions, 90 yards
- ATL – Alge Crumpler – 2 receptions, 34 yards

==== Week 4: vs. New Orleans Saints ====
Week 4: New Orleans Saints at Arizona Cardinals – Game summary

Quarter	1	2	3	4	Total
Saints	0	3	7	0	**10**
**Cardinals**	7	7	3	17	**34**

at Sun Devil Stadium, Tempe, Arizona

- Date: October 3
- Game time: 2:05 p.m. MST
- Game weather: 93 °F (34 °C)
- Game attendance: 28,109
- Referee: Tom White
- Box Score

Game information

**First quarter**

- ARI – Adrian Wilson 35-yard fumble return (Neil Rackers kick), 4:16. Cardinals 7–0.

**Second quarter**

- NO – John Carney 20-yard field goal, 14:56. Cardinals 7–3. **Drive: 8 plays, 59 yards, 4:20.**
- ARI – Obafemi Ayanbadejo 21-yard pass from Emmitt Smith (Neil Rackers kick), 1:12. Cardinals 14–3. **Drive: 5 plays, 69 yards, 2:36.**

**Third quarter**

- NO – Mel Mitchell 0-yard blocked punt return, 13:02. Cardinals 14–10.
- ARI – Neil Rackers 26-yard field goal, 1:29. Cardinals 17–10. **Drive: 10 plays, 80 yards, 5:38.**

**Fourth quarter**

- ARI – Neil Rackers 33-yard field goal, 5:44. Cardinals 20–10. **Drive: 10 plays, 32 yards, 5:10.**
- ARI – Emmitt Smith 29-yard run (Neil Rackers kick), 5:02. Cardinals 27–10. **Drive: 5 plays, 56 yards, 3:10.**
- ARI – Troy Hambrick 11-yard run (Neil Rackers kick), 1:54. Cardinals 34–10. **Drive: 5 plays, 37 yards, 1:58.**

**Top passers**

- NO – Aaron Brooks – 24/40, 242 yards
- ARI – Josh McCown – 12/28, 157 yards

**Top rushers**

- NO – Aaron Stecker – 8 rushes, 23 yards
- ARI – Emmitt Smith – 21 rushes, 127 yards, TD

**Top receivers**

- NO – Aaron Stecker – 6 receptions, 71 yards
- ARI – Larry Fitzgerald – 3 receptions, 61 yards

==== Week 5: at San Francisco 49ers ====
Week 5: Arizona Cardinals at San Francisco 49ers – Game summary

Quarter	1	2	3	4	OT	Total
Cardinals	0	14	0	14	0	**28**
**49ers**	0	6	6	16	3	**31**

at Monster Park, San Francisco, California

- Date: October 10
- Game time: 1:15 p.m. PST/2:15 p.m. MST
- Game weather: 93 °F (34 °C)
- Game attendance: 62,836
- Referee: Walt Anderson
- Box Score

Game information

**First quarter**

- No scoring plays

**Second quarter**

- ARI – Freddie Jones 16-yard pass from Josh McCown (Neil Rackers kick), 14:54. Cardinals 7–0. **Drive: 8 plays, 70 yards, 3:27.**
- SF – Todd Peterson 37-yard field goal, 8:57. Cardinals 7–3. **Drive: 12 plays, 70 yards, 5:57.**
- ARI – Troy Hambrick 2-yard pass from Josh McCown (Neil Rackers kick), 1:56. Cardinals 14–3. **Drive: 7 plays, 52 yards, 2:55.**
- SF – Todd Peterson 42-yard field goal, 0:16. Cardinals 14–6. **Drive: 9 plays, 58 yards, 1:40.**

**Third quarter**

- SF – Arnaz Battle 71-yard punt return (pass failed), 11:32. Cardinals 14–12.

**Fourth quarter**

- ARI – Emmitt Smith 10-yard run (Neil Rackers kick), 11:47. Cardinals 21–12. **Drive: 7 plays, 86 yards, 3:17.**
- ARI – Larry Fitzgerald 24-yard pass from Josh McCown (Neil Rackers kick), 8:19. Cardinals 28–12. **Drive: 4 plays, 44 yards, 2:11.**
- SF – Eric Johnson 6-yard pass from Tim Rattay (Tim Rattay run), 4:35. Cardinals 28–20. **Drive: 15 plays, 80 yards, 3:44.**
- SF – Brandon Lloyd 23-yard pass from Tim Rattay (Tim Rattay–Brandon Lloyd pass), 1:07. Tied 28–28. **Drive: 8 plays, 72 yards, 1:41.**

**Overtime**

- SF – Todd Peterson 32-yard field goal, 11:37. 49ers 31–28. **Drive: 7 plays, 47 yards, 3:23.**

**Top passers**

- ARI – Josh McCown – 19/34, 231 yards, 3 TD, INT
- SF – Tim Rattay – 38/57, 417 yards, 2 TD

**Top rushers**

- ARI – Emmitt Smith – 16 rushes, 63 yards, TD
- SF – Kevan Barlow – 14 rushes, 34 yards

**Top receivers**

- ARI – Larry Fitzgerald – 5 receptions, 94 yards, TD
- SF – Eric Johnson – 13 receptions, 162 yards, TD

With the overtime loss, the Cardinals fell to last place in the NFC West and entered their bye week at 1-4.

==== Week 7: vs. Seattle Seahawks ====
Week 7: Seattle Seahawks at Arizona Cardinals – Game summary

Quarter	1	2	3	4	Total
Seahawks	0	3	7	7	**17**
**Cardinals**	7	6	3	9	**25**

at Sun Devil Stadium, Tempe, Arizona

- Date: October 24
- Game time: 2:15 p.m. MST
- Game weather: 77 °F (25 °C)
- Game attendance: 35,695
- Referee: Bill Vinovich
- TV announcers (Fox): Spero Dedes, Erik Kramer and Kevin McCabe
- Box Score

Game information

**First quarter**

- ARI – Larry Fitzgerald 25-yard pass from Josh McCown (Neil Rackers kick), 8:23. Cardinals 7–0. **Drive: 6 plays, 43 yards, 3:30.**

**Second quarter**

- SEA – Josh Brown 54-yard field goal, 6:28. Cardinals 7–3. **Drive: 6 plays, 16 yards, 2:17.**
- ARI – Neil Rackers 55-yard field goal, 3:01. Cardinals 10–3. **Drive: 7 plays, 33 yards, 3:27.**
- ARI – Neil Rackers 55-yard field goal, 1:01. Cardinals 13–3. **Drive: 6 plays, 3 yards, 1:54.**

**Third quarter**

- ARI – Neil Rackers 50-yard field goal, 2:50. Cardinals 16–3. **Drive: 10 plays, 47 yards, 6:48.**
- SEA – Darrell Jackson 1-yard pass from Matt Hasselbeck (Josh Brown kick), 0:05. Cardinals 16–10. **Drive: 8 plays, 72 yards, 2:45.**

**Fourth quarter**

- SEA – Ken Lucas 21-yard interception return (Josh Brown kick), 13:07. Seahawks 17–16.
- ARI – Team safety, 8:50. Cardinals 18–17.
- ARI – Emmitt Smith 23-yard run (Neil Rackers kick), 1:53. Cardinals 25–17. **Drive: 3 plays, 24 yards, 0:44.**

**Top passers**

- SEA – Matt Hasselbeck – 14/41, 187 yards, TD, 4 INT
- ARI – Josh McCown – 22/36, 212 yards, TD, INT

**Top rushers**

- SEA – Shaun Alexander – 12 rushes, 65 yards
- ARI – Emmitt Smith – 26 rushes, 106 yards, TD

**Top receivers**

- SEA – Darrell Jackson – 8 receptions, 109 yards, TD
- ARI – Larry Fitzgerald – 4 receptions, 73 yards, TD

==== Week 8: at Buffalo Bills ====
Week 8: Arizona Cardinals at Buffalo Bills – Game summary

Quarter	1	2	3	4	Total
Cardinals	0	7	0	7	**14**
**Bills**	10	7	0	21	**38**

at Ralph Wilson Stadium, Orchard Park, New York

- Date: October 31
- Game time: 1:00 p.m. EST/11:00 a.m. MST
- Game weather: 55 °F (13 °C)
- Game attendance: 65,887
- Referee: Bernie Kukar
- Box Score

Game information

**First quarter**

- BUF – Rian Lindell 25-yard field goal, 9:32. Bills 3–0. **Drive: 7 plays, 19 yards, 3:16.**
- BUF – Willis McGahee 5-yard run (Rian Lindell kick), 4:31. Bills 10–0. **Drive: 4 plays, 55 yards, 2:28.**

**Second quarter**

- ARI – Obafemi Ayanbadejo 4-yard run (Neil Rackers kick), 8:25. Bills 10–7. **Drive: 9 plays, 58 yards, 4:22.**
- BUF – Terrence McGee 87-yard kickoff return (Rian Lindell kick), 8:12. Bills 17–7.

**Third quarter**

- No scoring plays

**Fourth quarter**

- BUF – Eric Moulds 8-yard pass from Drew Bledsoe (Rian Lindell kick), 14:55. Bills 24–7. **Drive: 4 plays, 19 yards, 1:54.**
- BUF – Tim Euhus 12-yard pass from Drew Bledsoe (Rian Lindell kick), 12:05. Bills 31–7. **Drive: 4 plays, 11 yards, 1:35.**
- BUF – Willis McGahee 1-yard run (Rian Lindell kick), 6:57. Bills 38–7. **Drive: 7 plays, 30 yards, 3:11.**
- ARI – Bryant Johnson 28-yard pass from Josh McCown (Neil Rackers kick), 3:54. Bills 38–14. **Drive: 10 plays, 72 yards, 3:03.**

**Top passers**

- ARI – Josh McCown – 9/24, 101 yards, TD
- BUF – Drew Bledsoe – 8/17, 81 yards, 2 TD

**Top rushers**

- ARI – Emmitt Smith – 22 rushes, 64 yards
- BUF – Willis McGahee – 30 rushes, 102 yards, 2 TD

**Top receivers**

- ARI – Anquan Boldin – 4 receptions, 50 yards
- BUF – Eric Moulds – 3 receptions, 40 yards, TD

==== Week 9: at Miami Dolphins ====
Week 9: Arizona Cardinals at Miami Dolphins – Game summary

Quarter	1	2	3	4	Total
**Cardinals**	3	0	7	14	**24**
Dolphins	9	3	0	11	**23**

at Pro Player Stadium, Miami Gardens, Florida

- Date: November 7
- Game time: 1:00 p.m. EST/11:00 a.m. MST
- Game weather: 80 °F (27 °C)
- Game attendance: 72,612
- Referee: Larry Nemmers
- Box Score

Game information

**First quarter**

- MIA – Bill Gramática 30-yard field goal, 12:02. Dolphins 3–0. **Drive: 7 plays, 12 yards, 2:50.**
- ARI – Neil Rackers 29-yard field goal, 9:02. Tied 3–3. **Drive: 7 plays, 67 yards, 3:00.**
- MIA – Rob Konrad 20-yard pass from Jay Fiedler (kick failed), 0:58. Dolphins 9–3. **Drive: 8 plays, 91 yards, 4:12.**

**Second quarter**

- MIA – Bill Gramática 29-yard field goal, 8:07. Dolphins 12–3. **Drive: 12 plays, 61 yards, 6:29.**

**Third quarter**

- ARI – Duane Starks 41-yard interception return (Neil Rackers kick), 8:12. Dolphins 12–10.

**Fourth quarter**

- ARI – Emmitt Smith 5-yard run (Neil Rackers kick), 9:44. Cardinals 17–12. **Drive: 8 plays, 80 yards, 4:39.**
- MIA – Bill Gramática 28-yard field goal, 7:53. Cardinals 17–15. **Drive: 6 plays, 54 yards, 1:51.**
- MIA – Sammy Morris 1-yard run (A.J. Feeley–Randy McMichael pass), 1:56. Dolphins 23–17. **Drive: 4 plays, 39 yards, 1:50.**
- ARI – Larry Fitzgerald 2-yard pass from Josh McCown (Neil Rackers kick), 0:19. Cardinals 24–23. **Drive: 9 plays, 70 yards, 1:37.**

**Top passers**

- ARI – Josh McCown – 18/31, 162 yards, TD
- MIA – Jay Fiedler – 12/21, 129 yards, TD

**Top rushers**

- ARI – Troy Hambrick – 4 rushes, 70 yards
- MIA – Travis Minor – 11 rushes, 90 yards

**Top receivers**

- ARI – Larry Fitzgerald – 5 receptions, 92 yards, TD
- MIA – Chris Chambers – 7 receptions, 104 yards

The Cardinals recorded their first-ever win against the Dolphins and ended their eight-game losing streak against them.

==== Week 10: vs. New York Giants ====
Week 10: New York Giants at Arizona Cardinals – Game summary

Quarter	1	2	3	4	Total
Giants	7	7	0	0	**14**
**Cardinals**	0	10	7	0	**17**

at Sun Devil Stadium, Tempe, Arizona

- Date: November 14
- Game time: 2:15 p.m. MST
- Game weather: 72 °F (22 °C)
- Game attendance: 42,297
- Referee: Peter Morelli
- Box Score

Game information

**First quarter**

- NYG – Jeremy Shockey 2-yard pass from Kurt Warner (Steve Christie kick), 3:38. Giants 7–0. **Drive: 6 plays, 43 yards, 3:30.**

**Second quarter**

- ARI – Neil Rackers 41-yard field goal, 13:36. Giants 7–3. **Drive: 7 plays, 33 yards, 3:27.**
- NYG – Tiki Barber 2-yard run (Steve Christie kick), 9:03. Giants 14–3. **Drive: 6 plays, 43 yards, 3:30.**
- ARI – Emmitt Smith 2-yard run (Neil Rackers kick), 0:39. Giants 14–10. **Drive: 6 plays, 43 yards, 3:30.**

**Third quarter**

- ARI – Emmitt Smith 3-yard run (Neil Rackers kick), 1:09. Cardinals 17–14. **Drive: 6 plays, 43 yards, 3:30.**

**Fourth quarter**

- No scoring plays

**Top passers**

- NYG – Kurt Warner – 19/30, 193 yards, TD
- ARI – Josh McCown – 12/24, 90 yards

**Top rushers**

- NYG – Tiki Barber – 21 rushes, 108 yards, TD
- ARI – Emmitt Smith – 19 rushes, 67 yards, 2 TD

**Top receivers**

- NYG – Amani Toomer – 8 receptions, 100 yards
- ARI – Bryant Johnson – 3 receptions, 32 yards

==== Week 11: at Carolina Panthers ====
Week 11: Arizona Cardinals at Carolina Panthers – Game summary

Quarter	1	2	3	4	Total
Cardinals	0	0	10	0	**10**
**Panthers**	14	14	0	7	**35**

at Bank of America Stadium, Charlotte, North Carolina

- Date: November 21
- Game time: 1:05 p.m. EST/11:05 a.m. MST
- Game weather: 68 °F (20 °C)
- Game attendance: 72,796
- Referee: Bill Carollo
- Box Score

Game information

**First quarter**

- CAR – Nick Goings 2-yard run (Jeff Chandler kick), 6:55. Panthers 7–0. **Drive: 9 plays, 96 yards, 4:51.**
- CAR – Nick Goings 57-yard run (Jeff Chandler kick), 1:53. Panthers 14–0. **Drive: 3 plays, 79 yards, 1:31.**

**Second quarter**

- CAR – Nick Goings 1-yard run (Jeff Chandler kick), 4:31. Panthers 21–0. **Drive: 2 plays, 1 yard, 0:11.**
- CAR – Muhsin Muhammad 28-yard pass from Jake Delhomme (Jeff Chandler kick), 0:02. Panthers 28–0. **Drive: 4 plays, 39 yards, 0:56.**

**Third quarter**

- ARI – Larry Fitzgerald 21-yard pass from Shaun King (Neil Rackers kick), 9:20. Panthers 28–7. **Drive: 10 plays, 84 yards, 4:36.**
- ARI – Neil Rackers 28-yard field goal, 4:40. Panthers 28–10. **Drive: 7 plays, 41 yards, 2:53.**

**Fourth quarter**

- CAR – Muhsin Muhammad 17-yard pass from Jake Delhomme (Jeff Chandler kick), 11:38. Panthers 35–10. **Drive: 3 plays, 18 yards, 0:56.**

**Top passers**

- ARI – Shaun King – 28/52, 343 yards, TD, 3 INT
- CAR – Jake Delhomme – 12/25, 157 yards, 2 TD, INT

**Top rushers**

- ARI – Emmitt Smith – 11 rushes, 26 yards
- CAR – Nick Goings – 22 rushes, 121 yards, 3 TD

**Top receivers**

- ARI – Larry Fitzgerald – 7 receptions, 92 yards, TD
- CAR – Muhsin Muhammad – 6 receptions, 118 yards, 2 TD

==== Week 12: vs. New York Jets ====
Week 12: New York Jets at Arizona Cardinals – Game summary

Quarter	1	2	3	4	Total
**Jets**	0	3	10	0	**13**
Cardinals	0	3	0	0	**3**

at Sun Devil Stadium, Tempe, Arizona

- Date: November 28
- Game time: 2:15 p.m. MST
- Game weather: 63 °F (17 °C)
- Game attendance: 35,820
- Referee: Gerry Austin
- Box Score

Game information

**First quarter**

- No scoring plays

**Second quarter**

- NYJ – Doug Brien 28-yard field goal, 3:28. Jets 3–0. **Drive: 12 plays, 45 yards, 5:39.**
- ARI – Neil Rackers 20-yard field goal, 0:00. Tied 3–3. **Drive: 10 plays, 77 yards, 3:28.**

**Third quarter**

- NYJ – Doug Brien 46-yard field goal, 4:53. Jets 6–3. **Drive: 11 plays, 57 yards, 5:24.**
- NYJ – Santana Moss 69-yard pass from Quincy Carter (Doug Brien kick), 2:41. Jets 13–3. **Drive: 1 play, 69 yards, 0:10.**

**Fourth quarter**

- No scoring plays

**Top passers**

- NYJ – Quincy Carter – 8/12, 133 yards, TD
- ARI – Shaun King – 14/26, 119 yards, INT

**Top rushers**

- NYJ – Curtis Martin – 24 rushes, 99 yards
- ARI – Larry Croom – 10 rushes, 25 yards

**Top receivers**

- NYJ – Santana Moss – 5 receptions, 109 yards, TD
- ARI – Anquan Boldin – 8 receptions, 87 yards

==== Week 13: at Detroit Lions ====
Week 13: Arizona Cardinals at Detroit Lions – Game summary

Quarter	1	2	3	4	Total
Cardinals	3	9	0	0	**12**
**Lions**	7	7	6	6	**26**

at Ford Field, Detroit, Michigan

- Date: December 5
- Game time: 1:05 p.m. EST/11:05 a.m. MST
- Game weather: None (Indoor stadium)
- Game attendance: 62,262
- Referee: Jeff Triplette
- Box Score

Game information

**First quarter**

- ARI – Neil Rackers 42-yard field goal, 11:09. Cardinals 3–0. **Drive: 6 plays, 20 yards, 2:38.**
- DET – Tai Streets 17-yard pass from Joey Harrington (Jason Hanson kick), 3:05. Lions 7–3. **Drive: 9 plays, 76 yards, 5:14.**

**Second quarter**

- ARI – Neil Rackers 33-yard field goal, 14:13. Lions 7–6. **Drive: 7 plays, 23 yards, 3:52.**
- DET – Kevin Jones 2-yard run (Jason Hanson kick), 8:13. Lions 14–6. **Drive: 5 plays, 61 yards, 2:28.**
- ARI – Freddie Jones 33-yard pass from John Navarre (pass failed), 3:40. Lions 14–12. **Drive: 9 plays, 80 yards, 4:33.**

**Third quarter**

- DET – Jason Hanson 45-yard field goal, 7:32. Lions 17–12. **Drive: 8 plays, 38 yards, 3:35.**
- DET – Jason Hanson 22-yard field goal, 3:17. Lions 20–12. **Drive: 4 plays, 7 yards, 1:26.**

**Fourth quarter**

- DET – Jason Hanson 31-yard field goal, 10:00. Lions 23–12. **Drive: 9 plays, 67 yards, 4:51.**
- DET – Jason Hanson 36-yard field goal, 5:13. Lions 26–12. **Drive: 7 plays, 12 yards, 2:47.**

**Top passers**

- ARI – John Navarre – 18/40, 168 yards, TD, 4 INT
- DET – Joey Harrington – 15/27, 196 yards, TD, INT

**Top rushers**

- ARI – Larry Croom – 18 rushes, 49 yards
- DET – Kevin Jones – 26 rushes, 196 yards, TD

**Top receivers**

- ARI – Anquan Boldin – 5 receptions, 48 yards
- DET – Roy Williams – 4 receptions, 76 yards

==== Week 14: vs. San Francisco 49ers ====
Week 14: San Francisco 49ers at Arizona Cardinals – Game summary

Quarter	1	2	3	4	OT	Total
**49ers**	7	14	7	0	3	**31**
Cardinals	0	3	7	18	0	**28**

at Sun Devil Stadium, Tempe, Arizona

- Date: December 12
- Game time: 2:15 p.m. MST
- Game weather: 74 °F (23 °C)
- Game attendance: 35,069
- Referee: Bill Leavy
- Box Score

Game information

**First quarter**

- SF – Brandon Lloyd 5-yard pass from Ken Dorsey (Todd Peterson kick), 9:48. 49ers 7–0. **Drive: 6 plays, 11 yards, 2:07.**

**Second quarter**

- SF – Cedrick Wilson 19-yard pass from Ken Dorsey (Todd Peterson kick), 13:36. 49ers 14–0. **Drive: 11 plays, 75 yards, 6:05.**
- SF – Maurice Hicks 1-yard run (Todd Peterson kick), 8:19. 49ers 21–0. **Drive: 6 plays, 44 yards, 3:05.**
- ARI – Neil Rackers 44-yard field goal, 3:15. 49ers 21–3. **Drive: 12 plays, 54 yards, 5:04.**

**Third quarter**

- SF – Cedrick Wilson 27-yard pass from Ken Dorsey (Todd Peterson kick), 9:57. 49ers 28–3. **Drive: 9 plays, 69 yards, 5:03.**
- ARI – Obafemi Ayanbadejo 4-yard run (Neil Rackers kick), 1:59. 49ers 28–10. **Drive: 9 plays, 87 yards, 4:04.**

**Fourth quarter**

- ARI – Obafemi Ayanbadejo 1-yard run (Neil Rackers kick), 11:53. 49ers 28–17. **Drive: 8 plays, 53 yards, 4:08.**
- ARI – Emmitt Smith 8-yard run (Josh McCown run), 2:40. 49ers 28–25. **Drive: 6 plays, 56 yards, 1:08.**
- ARI – Neil Rackers 22-yard field goal, 0:59. Tied 28–28. **Drive: 5 plays, 16 yards, 1:17.**

**Overtime**

- SF – Todd Peterson 31-yard field goal, 8:38. 49ers 31–28. **Drive: 6 plays, 36 yards, 2:22.**

**Top passers**

- SF – Ken Dorsey – 18/34, 191 yards, 3 TD
- ARI – Josh McCown – 26/44, 307 yards, INT

**Top rushers**

- SF – Maurice Hicks – 34 rushes, 139 yards, TD
- ARI – Emmitt Smith – 18 rushes, 53 yards, TD

**Top receivers**

- SF – Cedrick Wilson – 5 receptions, 83 yards, 2 TD
- ARI – Anquan Boldin – 9 receptions, 109 yards

With the overtime loss, the Cardinals were swept by the 49ers and dropped to 4-9, thus, eliminating them from playoff contention for the 6th year in a row. They would end up being the only team to lose to San Francisco in 2004.

==== Week 15: vs. St. Louis Rams ====
Week 15: St. Louis Rams at Arizona Cardinals – Game summary

Quarter	1	2	3	4	Total
Rams	0	7	0	0	**7**
**Cardinals**	10	7	7	7	**31**

at Sun Devil Stadium, Tempe, Arizona

- Date: December 19
- Game time: 2:05 p.m. MST
- Game weather: 75 °F (24 °C)
- Game attendance: 40,070
- Referee: Mike Carey
- Box Score

Game information

**First quarter**

- ARI – Josh McCown 1-yard run (Neil Rackers kick), 5:24. Cardinals 7–0. **Drive: 10 plays, 73 yards, 4:12.**
- ARI – Neil Rackers 48-yard field goal, 1:44. Cardinals 10–0. **Drive: 8 plays, 14 yards, 3:25.**

**Second quarter**

- ARI – Larry Fitzgerald 8-yard pass from Josh McCown (Neil Rackers kick), 12:24. Cardinals 17–0. **Drive: 6 plays, 45 yards, 2:46.**
- STL – Leonard Little 61-yard fumble return (Jeff Wilkins kick), 0:07. Cardinals 17–7.

**Third quarter**

- ARI – Larry Fitzgerald 4-yard pass from Josh McCown (Neil Rackers kick), 7:02. Cardinals 24–7. **Drive: 10 plays, 54 yards, 4:44.**

**Fourth quarter**

- ARI – Josh McCown 9-yard run (Neil Rackers kick), 10:54. Cardinals 31–7. **Drive: 10 plays, 80 yards, 4:39.**

**Top passers**

- STL – Jamie Martin – 16/30, 188 yards
- ARI – Josh McCown – 22/34, 287 yards, 2 TD

**Top rushers**

- STL – Marshall Faulk – 10 rushes, 22 yards
- ARI – Emmitt Smith – 19 rushes, 71 yards

**Top receivers**

- STL – Torry Holt – 6 receptions, 95 yards
- ARI – Bryant Johnson – 3 receptions, 69 yards

==== Week 16: at Seattle Seahawks ====
Week 16: Arizona Cardinals at Seattle Seahawks – Game summary

Quarter	1	2	3	4	Total
Cardinals	7	0	0	14	**21**
**Seahawks**	0	10	7	7	**24**

at Qwest Field, Seattle, Washington

- Date: December 26
- Game time: 1:15 p.m. PST/2:15 p.m. MST
- Game weather: 46 °F (8 °C)
- Game attendance: 65,825
- Referee: Tony Corrente
- TV announcers (Fox): Curt Menefee, Tim Green and Tony Ventrella
- Box Score

Game information

**First quarter**

- ARI – Anquan Boldin 31-yard pass from Josh McCown (Neil Rackers kick), 4:23. Cardinals 7–0. **Drive: 4 plays, 52 yards, 1:32.**

**Second quarter**

- SEA – Shaun Alexander 1-yard run (Josh Brown kick), 4:44. Tied 7–7. **Drive: 6 plays, 20 yards, 2:41.**
- SEA – Josh Brown 34-yard field goal, 0:00. Seahawks 10–7. **Drive: 10 plays, 53 yards, 3:10.**

**Third quarter**

- SEA – Shaun Alexander 17-yard run (Josh Brown kick), 3:06. Seahawks 17–7. **Drive: 4 plays, 55 yards, 2:28.**

**Fourth quarter**

- SEA – Shaun Alexander 23-yard run (Josh Brown kick), 14:50. Seahawks 24–7. **Drive: 5 plays, 82 yards, 2:49.**
- ARI – Larry Fitzgerald 29-yard pass from Josh McCown (Neil Rackers kick), 11:32. Seahawks 24–14. **Drive: 5 plays, 39 yards, 2:53.**
- ARI – Larry Fitzgerald 29-yard pass from Josh McCown (Neil Rackers kick), 2:30. Seahawks 24–21. **Drive: 9 plays, 76 yards, 3:18.**

**Top passers**

- ARI – Josh McCown – 21/33, 248 yards, 3 TD, 2 INT
- SEA – Trent Dilfer – 10/26, 128 yards, INT

**Top rushers**

- ARI – Emmitt Smith – 23 rushes, 65 yards
- SEA – Shaun Alexander – 30 rushes, 154 yards, 3 TD

**Top receivers**

- ARI – Anquan Boldin – 7 receptions, 107 yards, TD
- SEA – Darrell Jackson – 6 receptions, 101 yards

With the loss, the Cardinals fell to 5-10 and finished 2-4 against the NFC West.

==== Week 17: vs. Tampa Bay Buccaneers ====
Week 17: Tampa Bay Buccaneers at Arizona Cardinals – Game summary

Quarter	1	2	3	4	Total
Buccaneers	0	0	7	0	**7**
**Cardinals**	3	3	0	6	**12**

at Sun Devil Stadium, Tempe, Arizona

- Date: January 2
- Game time: 2:05 p.m. MST
- Game weather: 63 °F (17 °C)
- Game attendance: 31,650
- Referee: Walt Anderson
- Box Score

Game information

**First quarter**

- ARI – Neil Rackers 40-yard field goal, 9:06. Cardinals 3–0. **Drive: 8 plays, 47 yards, 3:15.**

**Second quarter**

- ARI – Neil Rackers 45-yard field goal, 0:03. Cardinals 6–0. **Drive: 6 plays, 12 yards, 0:40.**

**Third quarter**

- TB – Michael Clayton 75-yard pass from Chris Simms (Jay Taylor kick), 1:24. Buccaneers 7–6. **Drive: 1 play, 75 yards, 0:15.**

**Fourth quarter**

- ARI – Neil Rackers 39-yard field goal, 11:07. Cardinals 9–7. **Drive: 10 plays, 56 yards, 5:17.**
- ARI – Neil Rackers 31-yard field goal, 6:12. Cardinals 12–7. **Drive: 4 plays, 1 yard, 1:43.**

**Top passers**

- TB – Chris Simms – 16/32, 224 yards, TD, 2 INT
- ARI – Josh McCown – 16/36, 115 yards, INT

**Top rushers**

- TB – Michael Pittman – 16 rushes, 50 yards
- ARI – Emmitt Smith – 23 rushes, 69 yards

**Top receivers**

- TB – Michael Clayton – 2 receptions, 86 yards, TD
- ARI – Larry Fitzgerald – 3 receptions, 36 yards

== Standings ==
NFC West
	W	L	T	PCT	DIV	CONF	PF	PA	STK
^{(4)} Seattle Seahawks	9	7	0	.563	3–3	8–4	371	373	W2
^{(5)} St. Louis Rams	8	8	0	.500	5–1	7–5	319	392	W2
Arizona Cardinals	6	10	0	.375	2–4	5–7	284	322	W1
San Francisco 49ers	2	14	0	.125	2–4	2–10	259	452	L3

NFC
#	Team	Division	W	L	T	PCT	DIV	CONF	SOS	SOV	STK
Division leaders
1	Philadelphia Eagles	East	13	3	0	.813	6–0	11–1	.453	.409	L2
2	Atlanta Falcons	South	11	5	0	.688	4–2	8–4	.420	.432	L2
3	Green Bay Packers	North	10	6	0	.625	5–1	9–3	.457	.419	W2
4	Seattle Seahawks	West	9	7	0	.563	3–3	8–4	.445	.368	W2
Wild cards
5 (Note: St. Louis clinched the NFC #5 seed instead of Minnesota or New Orleans based on better conference record (7–5 to Minnesota’s 5–7 to New Orleans’ 6–6).)	St. Louis Rams	West	8	8	0	.500	5–1	7–5	.488	.438	W2
6 (Note: Minnesota clinched the NFC #6 seed instead of New Orleans based on head-to-head victory.)	Minnesota Vikings	North	8	8	0	.500	3–3	5–7	.480	.406	L2
Did not qualify for the postseason
7	New Orleans Saints	South	8	8	0	.500	3–3	6–6	.465	.427	W4
8	Carolina Panthers	South	7	9	0	.438	3–3	6–6	.496	.366	L1
9 (Note: Detroit finished ahead of Arizona and New York Giants based upon head-to-head record (2–0 versus Arizona’s 1–1 and New York Giants’ 0–2). Division tiebreak was initially used to eliminate Dallas and Washington.)	Detroit Lions	North	6	10	0	.375	2–4	5–7	.496	.417	L2
10	Arizona Cardinals	West	6	10	0	.375	2–4	5–7	.461	.417	W1
11 (Note: New York Giants finished ahead of Dallas and Washington in the NFC East based on better head-to-head record (3–1 to Dallas‘ 2–2 to Washington’s 1–3).)	New York Giants	East	6	10	0	.375	3–3	5–7	.516	.417	W1
12 (Note: Dallas finished ahead of Washington in the NFC East based on head-to-head sweep.)	Dallas Cowboys	East	6	10	0	.375	2–4	5–7	.516	.375	L1
13	Washington Redskins	East	6	10	0	.375	1–5	6–6	.477	.333	W1
14 (Note: Tampa Bay finished ahead of Chicago based upon head-to-head victory.)	Tampa Bay Buccaneers	South	5	11	0	.313	2–4	4–8	.477	.413	L4
15	Chicago Bears	North	5	11	0	.313	2–4	4–8	.465	.388	L4
16	San Francisco 49ers	West	2	14	0	.125	2–4	2–10	.488	.375	L3
Tiebreakers (Note: When breaking ties for three or more teams under the NFL's rules, they are first broken within divisions, then comparing only the highest-ranked remaining team from each division.)
