= Renaldo Hill =

American football player and coach (born 1978)

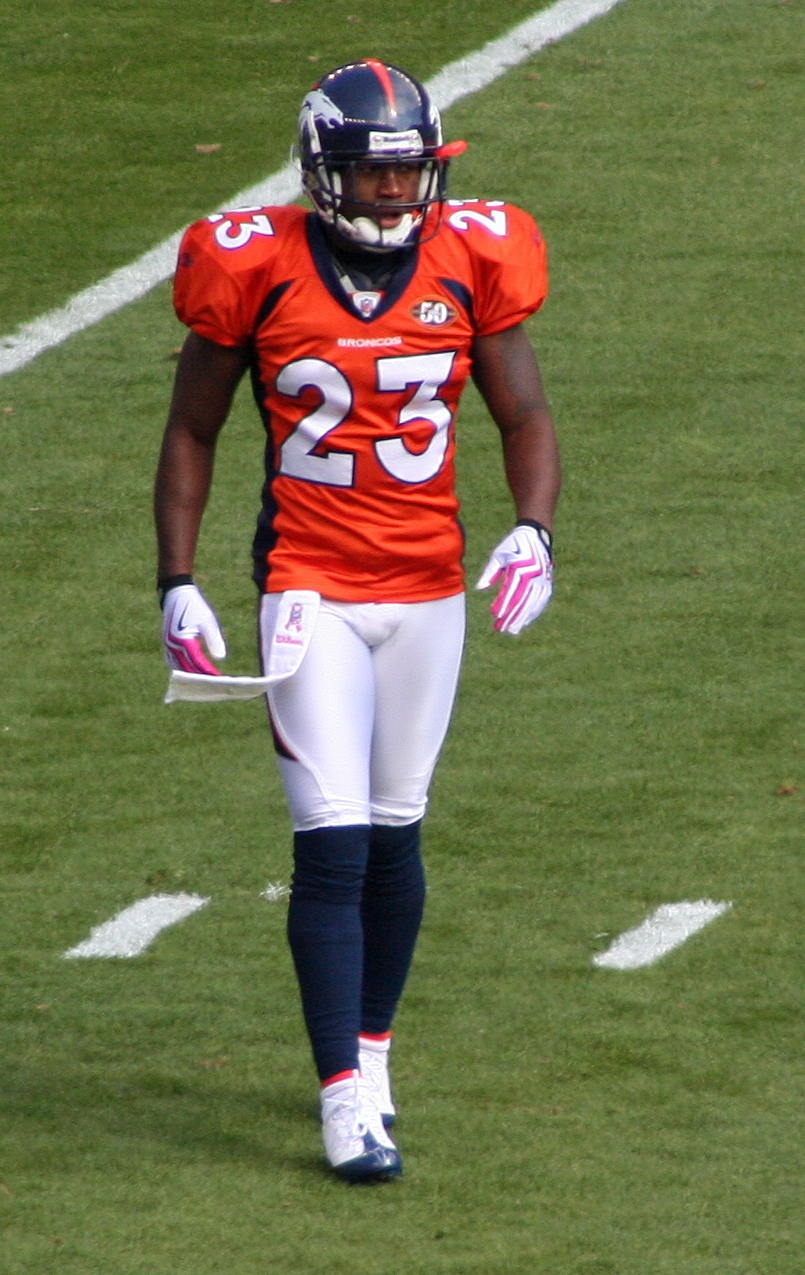
- Hill with the Denver Broncos in 2009

Carolina Panthers
- Title: Coach

Personal information
- Born: November 12, 1978 (age 47); Detroit, Michigan, U.S.
- Listed height: 5 ft 11 in (1.80 m)
- Listed weight: 205 lb (93 kg)

Career information
- Position: Safety (No. 45, 21, 22, 24, 23)
- High school: Chadsey (Detroit)
- College: Michigan State
- NFL draft: 2001: 7th round, 202nd overall pick

Career history

Playing
- Arizona Cardinals (2001–2004); Oakland Raiders (2005); Miami Dolphins (2006–2008); Denver Broncos (2009–2010)

Coaching
- Wyoming (2012) Graduate assistant; Wyoming (2013) Cornerbacks coach; Pittsburgh (2015–2017) Defensive backs coach; Miami Dolphins (2018) Assistant defensive backs coach; Denver Broncos (2019–2020) Defensive backs coach; Los Angeles Chargers (2021–2022) Defensive coordinator; Miami Dolphins (2023) Pass game coordinator & defensive backs coach; Carolina Panthers (2025–present) Defensive backs coach

Awards and highlights
- First-team All-Big Ten (2000)

Career NFL statistics
- Total tackles: 607
- Sacks: 6.5
- Forced fumbles: 5
- Fumble recoveries: 4
- Interceptions: 19
- Defensive touchdowns: 2
- Stats at Pro Football Reference
- Coaching profile at Pro Football Reference

Renaldo L. Hill (born November 12, 1978) is an American former professional football safety who currently serves as a defensive backs coach for the Carolina Panthers of the National Football League (NFL). He served as the defensive backs coach for the Denver Broncos from 2019 to 2020, the defensive coordinator for the Los Angeles Chargers from 2021 to 2022, and an assistant defensive coach for the Miami Dolphins in 2023.

Hill played college football as a strong safety at Michigan State and was selected by the Arizona Cardinals in the seventh round of the 2001 NFL draft. During his 10 seasons as a player, Hill played for the Cardinals, Oakland Raiders, Miami Dolphins and Denver Broncos.

== Early life ==
Hill attended Chadsey High School in Detroit, Michigan, where he was a four-year starter at defensive back. He was also named to the school's academic honor roll on two occasions.

== Playing career ==
=== College ===
Hill was a three-year letterman (1998–2000) for the Michigan State Spartans, the first two years of which he played under former head coach Nick Saban. Hill started all 35 games in which he played during that time at right cornerback, and concluded his career with 182 total tackles, 11 stops for loss, nine interceptions and 36 passes defensed.

Hill had a career-high five interceptions during his first season in 1998. He was an honorable mention All-Big Ten Conference selection the following year when he amassed 57 tackles, an interception and 13 passes defensed. His senior season in 2000, Hill was a second-team All-Big Ten performer in his when he posted 71 tackles, three interceptions, and 11 passes defensed.

=== National Football League ===
Pre-draft measurables
Height	Weight	Arm length	Hand span	40-yard dash	10-yard split	20-yard split	20-yard shuttle	Three-cone drill	Vertical jump	Broad jump	Bench press
5 ft 11 in (1.80 m)	178 lb (81 kg)	30 1/2 in (0.77 m)	8 1/2 in (0.22 m)	4.65 s	1.67 s	2.67 s	4.18 s	7.07 s	35.5 in (0.90 m)	9 ft 8 in (2.95 m)	10 reps
All values from NFL Combine

==== Arizona Cardinals ====
Hill was originally selected by the Arizona Cardinals in the seventh round (202nd overall) in the 2001 NFL draft. He played in 14 games in his rookie season, including one start, and recorded 22 tackles, three passes defensed and a half-sack. He added five special teams tackles. He had five tackles and the first half-sack of his career on a five-yard sack of Philadelphia Eagles quarterback Donovan McNabb. Hill's first pro start came against the New York Giants on December 15. He was inactive for the final two games of the season with a hamstring injury.

In 2002 Hill appeared in 14 contests, including seven starts at cornerback, and missed two games with a foot injury. He posted 66 tackles, two interceptions, 10 passes defensed, a sack and two fumble recoveries on the year, while also contributing 11 stops on special teams. He collected a season-high 10 tackles against the San Diego Chargers when he came off bench in first quarter to replace an injured Duane Starks. Hill went on to start each of the next four games in Starks’ spot. In 16–13 win against the Carolina Panthers on October 6, he recovered a pair of Panthers fumbles - the first Cardinal to do that since Michael Bankston on October 17, 1993. Hill's first career interception came against the Dallas Cowboys on October 20 when he picked off a Quincy Carter pass in the end zone during Arizona's 9–6 win. He recorded an eight-yard sack of Marc Bulger against the St. Louis Rams, which was the first full sack of his career. Hill also intercepted a Jeff Garcia pass in the fourth quarter against the San Francisco 49ers on December 21.

Hill started all 14 games in which he played at cornerback in 2003, posting 67 tackles, five interceptions for 119 yards in returns including a touchdown, seven passes defensed, two sacks and a forced fumble. His interception ranked second on the team behind only Dexter Jackson's six. Hill missed two games during the season with a sprained ankle.

During the season, Hill intercepted a pair of Marc Bulger passes in one game, including one returned 70 yards for a score. He also picked off Quincy Carter, Jon Kitna and Trent Dilfer during the season. His two sacks came against Bulger and Kitna.

Hill played in 13 games in 2004 with ten starts at cornerback, and was inactive for three contests in 2004. On the year, he collected 46 tackles, an interception, nine passes defensed, a sack and a forced fumble. His lone interception of the year occurred on October 24 against the Seattle Seahawks, as he picked off a Matt Hasselbeck pass in the Cardinals’ 25–17 victory. His only sack of the season came against then-Rams quarterback Chris Chandler.

==== Oakland Raiders ====
As an unrestricted free agent in 2005, Hill signed a one-year contract with the Oakland Raiders. The deal included a base salary of $565,000 and a $25,000 signing bonus. It was also heavily based on incentives, which could have allowed Hill to earn as much as $1.4 million.

Hill played in all 16 games during his lone season with the Raiders, opening three games at free safety and ten contests as the nickel cornerback behind Charles Woodson and Nnamdi Asomugha. He recorded 89 tackles, an interception and five passes defensed on the year, while also tallying three special teams stops. His only interception of the year came against the Cleveland Browns on December 18 when he snared a Charlie Frye pass.

==== Miami Dolphins ====
On March 16, 2006, Hill agreed to a three-year deal with the Miami Dolphins. The contract was worth $6 million and included a $2 million signing bonus. The move reunited him with then-Dolphins head coach Nick Saban, who was the head coach at Michigan State during Hill's first two seasons with the Spartans.

Thanks in part to the contract holdout of rookie defensive back Jason Allen, Hill was able to win the starting free safety job before the regular season began. He went on to start all 16 games for the Dolphins in 2006 and finished third on the team (behind linebackers Zach Thomas and Channing Crowder) with 83 tackles. Hill also had two interceptions, which tied him with Jason Taylor for the team lead, and a fumble recovery he returned for a touchdown. Hill picked off Detroit Lions quarterback Jon Kitna and Chicago Bears quarterback Rex Grossman during the season (both in wins by the Dolphins). He also returned a Chester Taylor fumble forced by Matt Roth 48 yards for a touchdown in the fourth quarter of a 24–20 win over the Minnesota Vikings.

During training camp, Hill initially lost his job to recently signed free agent Chris Crocker. Eventually, though the secondary was exposed during the first two weeks particularly in Week 2 against the Arizona Cardinals, giving up pass plays of 50 or more yards. In Week 3, Hill got the free safety job once again, and it paid huge dividends as the secondary play became more solid and it also helped Miami earn its first victory of the season against the Patriots. Renaldo Hill also proved to be solid in run support, finishing with 74 tackles. He nabbed three interceptions.

==== Denver Broncos ====
On February 27, 2009, Hill signed a four-year, $10 million contract with the Denver Broncos. The contract included $3 million guaranteed. Hill played in Denver for two seasons before being released on July 30, 2011.

During his 10 NFL seasons, Hill started 114-of-141 games played, recording 589 tackles (470 solo), 6.5 sacks (36.5 yds.), 19 interceptions (301 yds.) and 61 passes defensed.

== NFL career statistics ==
Legend
	Led the league
**Bold**	Career high

=== Regular season ===
Year	Team	Games		Tackles					Interceptions					Fumbles			
Year	Team	GP	GS	Cmb	Solo	Ast	Sck	TFL	Int	Yds	TD	Lng	PD	FF	FR	Yds	TD
2001	ARI	14	1	27	21	6	0.5	1	0	0	0	0	2	0	0	0	0
2002	ARI	14	7	63	59	4	1.0	1	2	4	0	3	8	0	**2**	0	0
2003	ARI	14	14	58	47	11	**2.0**	5	**5**	**119**	**1**	**70**	**11**	**1**	0	0	0
2004	ARI	13	10	52	44	8	1.0	**6**	1	2	0	2	10	**1**	0	0	0
2005	OAK	16	13	**89**	**75**	14	0.0	4	1	0	0	0	5	0	0	0	0
2006	MIA	16	16	86	64	**22**	0.0	2	2	33	0	21	9	0	1	**48**	**1**
2007	MIA	7	7	32	26	6	0.0	1	1	24	0	24	2	**1**	0	0	0
2008	MIA	16	15	78	63	15	0.0	2	3	34	0	17	4	0	0	0	0
2009	DEN	15	15	59	44	15	**2.0**	3	2	18	0	18	6	**1**	0	0	0
2010	DEN	16	16	63	54	9	0.0	0	2	67	0	36	4	**1**	1	0	0
		141	114	607	497	110	6.5	25	19	301	1	70	61	5	4	48	1

=== Postseason ===
Year	Team	Games		Tackles					Interceptions					Fumbles			
Year	Team	GP	GS	Cmb	Solo	Ast	Sck	TFL	Int	Yds	TD	Lng	PD	FF	FR	Yds	TD
2008	MIA	1	1	2	2	0	0.0	0	0	0	0	0	0	0	0	0	0
		1	1	2	2	0	0.0	0	0	0	0	0	0	0	0	0	0

== Coaching career ==
=== Early career ===
Hill began his coaching career at Wyoming (2012–13), where he served as a graduate assistant in 2012 before being promoted to cornerbacks coach in 2013.

=== University of Pittsburgh Panthers ===
In 2015, Hill became the defensive backs coach at Pittsburgh where he coached for three seasons.

=== Miami Dolphins ===
In 2018, Hill was hired by the Miami Dolphins as their assistant defensive backs coach under head coach Adam Gase.

=== Denver Broncos ===
On January 17, 2019, Hill was hired by the Denver Broncos as their defensive backs coach under head coach Vic Fangio.

=== Los Angeles Chargers ===
On January 25, 2021, Hill was hired by the Los Angeles Chargers as their defensive coordinator under head coach Brandon Staley, whom he worked with in Denver.

=== Miami Dolphins ===
On February 20, 2023, Hill was hired as a pass game coordinator and a defensive backs coach by the Miami Dolphins.

=== Carolina Panthers ===
On January 30, 2025, the Carolina Panthers added Hill to their coaching staff.

== Personal life ==
Renaldo is the younger brother of Ray Hill, who also played at Michigan State and with the Dolphins as well (1998–2000). They are the third set of brothers to have played for the Dolphins, joining the Blackwoods (safety Glenn, 1979–87; safety Lyle, 1981–86) and the Ayanbadejos (fullback Obafemi, 2003; linebacker Brendon, 2003–04).
