= Ayanbadejo =

Àyánbádéjo
- Gender: Male
- Language: Yoruba

Origin
- Origin: Nigerian
- Meaning: The drummer mingled with royalty.
- Region of origin: South West, Nigeria

Àyánbádéjo (/ˌaɪ.ənbəˈdeɪdʒoʊ/) is a Nigerian surname. It is a male name and of Yoruba origin, which is peculiar to the lineage of the traditional drummers known as "Ayan". The name Àyánbádéjo means "The drummer mingled with royalty.". The diminutive form is Àyánbádé which means "The drummer has met with royalty". The name "Ayan" - Àyánbádéjo is common among the Oyo people of the Southwest, Nigeria.

== Notable individuals with the name ==
- Brendon Ayanbadejo (born 1976), American football linebacker.
- Obafemi Ayanbadejo (born 1975), American football fullback, brother of Brendon.
