= Steponavičius =

- Lithuanian surname
- m.: Steponavičius
- f.: (unmarried): Steponavičiūtė
- f.: (married): Steponavičienė

Steponavičius is a Lithuanian language family name. It corresponds to East-Slavic Stepanovich and South Slavic Stepanović. The surname is derived from the name Stepan.

The surname may refer to:

- Algirdas Steponavičius (1927–1996), Lithuanian artist, a Lithuanian National Culture and Arts prize recipient
- Dalius Steponavicuis, founder of Speed Factory Racing
- Faustas Steponavičius (born 2004), Lithuanian football forward
- Gintaras Steponavičius (born 1967), Lithuanian politician, speaker of Seimas, minister of education
- Julijonas Steponavičius, bishop of Vilnius
- Jonas Steponavičius (1880–1947), Lithuanian Roman Catholic priest
- Mindaugas Steponavičius, Lithuanian military officer

== See also ==
- Birutė Žilytė-Steponavičienė (born 1930), Lithuanian graphic artist
