= Stepanovich =

Stepanóvich (Russian, Belarusian) or Stepanovych (Ukrainian) is an East Slavic-language surname.

It corresponds to Lithuanian Steponavicius and South Slavic Stepanović. It is a patronymic surname is derived from the name Stepán.

It should not be confused with the patronymic "Stepánovich". The two differ in pronunciation: the surname has an accent on the third syllable (second from the end), while the patronymic has an accent on the second syllable (as in the name "Stepán").

== Notable bearers ==
- Alex Stepanovich (born 1981), former American football center
- Amie Stepanovich, American lawyer
- Duke Stepanovich, a fictional character in bylina
