= Stefanović =

Stefanović (pronounced [stefǎːnoʋitɕ], Serbian Cyrillic: Стефановић) is a Serbian surname meaning "son of Stefan" (Stephen). There are also variants of Stevanović and Stepanović. It may refer to:

- Aleksandar "Saša" Stefanović, Serbian-American basketball player
- Dejan Stefanović, Serbian footballer
- Gavril Stefanović Venclović, Serbian writer
- Igor Stefanović, Serbian footballer
- Jani Stefanovic, musician
- Jesse Stefanovic, fictional character in Degrassi: The Next Generation
- Jovan Stefanović, Serbian footballer
- Karl Stefanovic, Australian television presenter
- Ljubiša Stefanović, Serbian-American basketball player
- Margita Stefanović, Serbian musician
- Milenko Stefanović, Serbian musician
- Peter Stefanovic, Australian television presenter
- Saša Stefanović, Serbian basketball player
- Sasha Stefanovic (born 1998), Serbian-American basketball player
- Vuk Stefanović Karadžić, Serbian linguist
