= Chadsey High School =

Public school in Detroit, Michigan, US

Coordinates: 42°20′09.8″N 83°07′53.8″W

Charles E. Chadsey High School

Location
- 5335 Martin Street; Detroit, Michigan 48210

Information
- School type: Public
- Status: Demolished, March 2011
- Closed: June, 2009
- School district: Detroit Public Schools
- Grades: 9-12
- Language: English and Spanish
- Area: Urban
- Colors: vermilion and gold
- Mascot: Explorers

Chadsey Senior High School was a public secondary school in Detroit, Michigan.

== History ==
Chadsey Senior High School was named in honor of Charles E. Chadsey - Superintendent of the Detroit Public Schools, 1912–1919; Chadsey High was constructed and organized in 1931. Since the school was not ready for occupancy on opening day, Chadsey's sessions were held - following dismissal of younger students - at adjacent Munger Intermediate School. Finally, on October 12, 1931, construction was completed and Chadsey High School began operation.

The date of occupancy - Columbus Day - inspired nicknames; for the athletic teams: the Explorers; the school newspaper: The Navigator; the school annual: The Compass, and Discovery: Chadsey's literary magazine. Fittingly, the school colors chosen for Chadsey High were those under which Columbus sailed: the vermilion and gold of Spain's Ferdinand and Isabella.

Chadsey High School added one half-grade of secondary classes, each semester until January 1934; the first graduating class celebrated its matriculation in June 1934. Chadsey High School was first accredited by the University of Michigan in 1934, and by the North Central Association of Colleges and Secondary Schools in 1939.

The Detroit school district underestimated the impact of population decline in the City of Detroit and failed to proactively manage reduction in staff and facilities; an emergency manager was appointed. The district's $285-million deficit for 2009-2010 led to the layoff of nearly 1,900 teachers and administrators; the financial difficulties also forced the closing of 29 educational facilities, including Charles E. Chadsey High School. Munger Elementary-Middle School is located on the former site.

Its neighborhoods were assigned to the Southwestern High School zone. Students began attending regular classes there in September 2009.

The school has been demolished as of February 9, 2011. The land was needed so Detroit Public Schools can build a new $22.3 million school on the property. Local artisans are being allowed to pick through the rubble for pieces of 1920s limestone for a community garden.

The track and field program won the girl's state championship in 1982.

== Notable alumni ==
- Marion Barber, Jr. (1978) former NFL running back (New York Jets 1982-1988) and father of NFL players Marion Barber III and Dominique Barber.
- Jerome Davis (1993) was a former NFL and CFL offensive tackle for the Detroit Lions, Calgary Stampeders, San Francisco 49ers, Toronto Argonauts and the Hamilton Tiger-Cats.
- Andrew Davison, former NFL player
- Karen Dennis (1966) head coach of the United States women's national team that competed in the 2000 Olympic Games and head women's track coach at Ohio State University; in 2005, Dennis was promoted to head coach of the OSU women’s track team.
- Ray Hill (1993) was a former NFL safety for the Buffalo Bills and the Miami Dolphins.
- Renaldo Hill (1996) was a former NFL safety for the Arizona Cardinals, Oakland Raiders, Miami Dolphins, Denver Broncos and the New Orleans Saints.
- Johnny Lipon (1943) was a former MLB player for the Detroit Tigers, Boston Red Sox, St. Louis Cardinals, and the Cincinnati Reds.
- Dan Roundfield (1971) NBA basketball player
- Bruce Thornton (1975) was a former NFL and USFL defensive end for the Dallas Cowboys, St. Louis Cardinals, Chicago Blitz, and the
- Michael Westbrook (1990) was a former NFL wide receiver for the Washington Redskins and the Cincinnati Bengals.
- Freeman White NFL and CFL tight end for the New York Giants and the Ottawa Rough Riders.
