= Ray Hill (American football) =

American football player (1975–2015)

No. 38, 28, 24
- Position: Defensive back

Personal information
- Born: August 7, 1975; Detroit, Michigan, U.S.
- Died: August 6, 2015 (aged 39); Allen, Texas, U.S.
- Listed height: 6 ft 0 in (1.83 m)
- Listed weight: 182 lb (83 kg)

Career information
- High school: Chadsey (Detroit, Michigan)
- College: Michigan State
- NFL draft: 1998: undrafted

Career history
- Buffalo Bills (1998); Miami Dolphins (1998–2000); Buffalo Bills (2000); New England Patriots (2001)

Awards and highlights
- Second-team All-Big Ten (1997)

Career NFL statistics
- Total tackles: 21
- Pass deflections: 2
- Fumble recoveries: 1
- Stats at Pro Football Reference

Raymond Millous Hill (August 7, 1975 – August 6, 2015) was a college and professional American football player. He was a defensive back at Michigan State, and played four seasons in the National Football League (NFL), splitting three seasons between the Miami Dolphins and the Buffalo Bills. He was signed by the New England Patriots as a free agent in 2001, and was part of their Super Bowl XXXVI championship season. He suffered a leg injury during the 2001 preseason, and was placed on injured reserve for the entire season. His younger brother Renaldo Hill, also played in the NFL.

== Early life ==
Hill attended Chadsey High School in Detroit, Michigan, where he was a three-year starter at defensive back.

== College career ==
Hill was a three-year starter (1995–1997) for the Michigan State Spartans under head coach Nick Saban. Hill finished his Spartan career with 115 solo tackles, six interceptions, and four forced fumbles.

A second-team All-Big Ten Conference selection in 1997, Hill recorded 68 tackles (two for losses, including a sack), intercepted four passes, and led the team in fumbles caused with three. Hill set a Spartan single-season record for most passes broken up in a season with 16.

== Professional career ==
=== Buffalo Bills ===
Hill originally signed with the Buffalo Bills as an undrafted rookie free agent on April 24, 1998. Hill saw action in four games, all as a reserve, where he totaled three special teams tackles.

=== Miami Dolphins ===
Hill was awarded to Miami Dolphins off waivers from the Buffalo Bills on November 19, 1998. Hill played in two regular season games and the first two postseason games of his career with the Dolphins.

In 1999, Hill appeared in all 16 regular season games. Recording one tackle and a pass defense on defense. Hill finished sixth on the team with 14 tackles on special teams, where he also forced a fumble. Hill appeared in both playoff games following the 1999 season in a reserve role.

Hill re-signed with the Dolphins as an exclusive rights free agent on May 5, 2000. During the 2000 season, Hill recorded seven special teams tackles (five solo and two assists), and one pass defensed, before being released by the Dolphins on October 25, 2000.

=== Buffalo Bills ===
On December 12, 2000, Hill returned to the Buffalo Bills as a free agent and saw action on special teams during the final five weeks of the season, recording four special teams tackles. After being granted free agency on March 1, 2001, Hill re-signed with the Bills and was waived on June 1, 2001.

=== New England Patriots ===
On June 11, 2001, Hill was claimed off waivers by the New England Patriots from the Bills. Hill suffered a leg injury on August 18, 2001, during a preseason game against the Carolina Panthers. On August 28, 2001, Hill was placed on injured reserve.

== Personal life ==
Ray Hill resided in Allen, Texas as a Juvenile Case Manager until his death in 2015.

== Death ==
Hill died on August 6, 2015, one day before his 40th birthday, from colon cancer.
