= Freeman White =

American football player (born 1943)

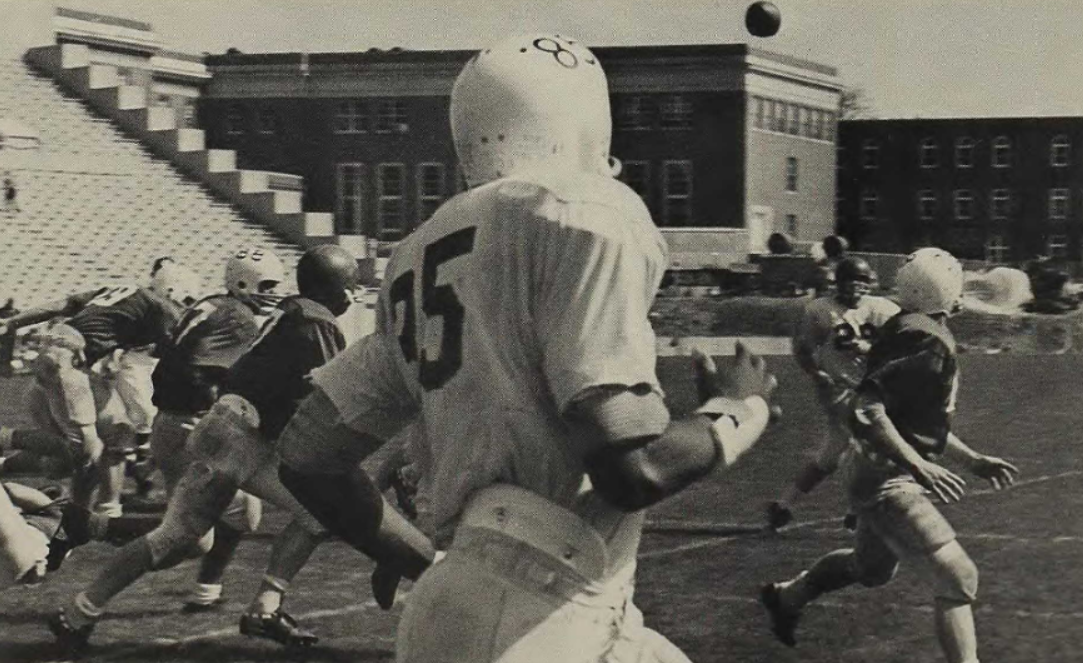
- White (No. 85) from 1965 Cornhusker

No. 81, 76
- Positions: Defensive back, Linebacker, Tight end

Personal information
- Born: December 17, 1943 (age 82); Montgomery, Alabama, U.S.
- Listed height: 6 ft 5 in (1.96 m)
- Listed weight: 225 lb (102 kg)

Career information
- High school: Chadsey (Detroit, Michigan)
- College: Nebraska (1962–1965)
- NFL draft: 1966: 9th round, 132nd overall pick
- AFL draft: 1966: 2nd round, 11th overall pick

Career history
- New York Giants (1966–1969); Ottawa Rough Riders (1970)

Awards and highlights
- Consensus All-American (1965); 2× First-team All-Big Eight (1964, 1965)

Career NFL statistics
- Receptions: 29
- Receiving yards: 315
- Touchdowns: 1
- Interceptions: 2
- Fumble recoveries: 1
- Sacks: 1
- Stats at Pro Football Reference

Freeman White II (born December 17, 1943) is an American former professional football player who played four seasons with the New York Giants of the National Football League (NFL). He was selected by the Giants in the ninth round of the 1966 NFL draft. He played college football for the Nebraska Cornhuskers and was a consensus All-American in 1965. White also played for the Ottawa Rough Riders of the Canadian Football League (CFL).

== Early life ==
Freeman White II was born on December 17, 1943, in Montgomery, Alabama. He played high school football at Chadsey High School in Detroit, Michigan, earning all-state honors. He earned four letters in football, four in basketball, three in baseball, and three in track.

== College career ==
White was a member of the Nebraska Cornhuskers of the University of Nebraska–Lincoln from 1962 to 1965. He was on the freshman team in 1962 and a three-year letterman from 1963 to 1965. He caught two passes for 24 yards in 1963. In 1964, White recorded 17 receptions for 338 yards and two touchdowns, earning Associated Press and United Press International first-team All-Big Eight Conference honors. His 338 receiving yards were the most in the Big Eight that season. He caught 28 passes for 458 yards and six touchdowns as a senior in 1965, garnering consensus All-American and first-team All-Big Eight recognition. White's 16.4 yards per catch and six receiving touchdowns led the Big Eight in both categories that year. His 28 receptions and 458 receiving yards both set school single-season records. He also set school single-game records his senior year with eight catches against TCU and 139 receiving yards against Colorado. White set school career records in catches with 47 and receiving yards with 820. He was inducted into the Nebraska Football Hall of Fame in 1982.

== Professional career ==
White was selected by the New York Giants in the ninth round, with the 132nd overall pick, of the 1966 NFL draft and by the Denver Broncos in the second round, with the 11th overall pick, of the 1966 AFL draft. He chose to sign with the Giants. He played in all 14 games, starting four, primarily as a linebacker during the 1966 season, recording one sack and two kick returns for 14 yards. White was moved to safety in 1967 and appeared in 14 games with six starts, totaling two interceptions for 53 yards and one fumble recovery. He played in 14 games, starting one, during the 1968 season. In 1969, White was converted to tight end, catching 29 passes for 315 yards and one touchdown. He was waived by the Giants on September 8, 1970.

White played in seven games for the Ottawa Rough Riders of the Canadian Football League as an offensive end in 1970, recording seven receptions for 148 yards.
