= Andrew Davison (American football) =

American football player (1979–2017)

No. 39, 26
- Position: Cornerback

Personal information
- Born: December 9, 1979; Detroit, Michigan
- Died: February 7, 2017 (aged 37); Detroit, Michigan
- Listed height: 5 ft 11 in (1.80 m)
- Listed weight: 185 lb (84 kg)

Career information
- High school: Chadsey (MI)
- College: Kansas
- NFL draft: 2002: undrafted

Career history
- New York Jets (2002); Dallas Cowboys (2003); New York Jets (2004–2005)*
- * Offseason or practice squad member only

Career NFL statistics
- Games played: 10
- Stats at Pro Football Reference

Andrew Monroe Davison (December 9, 1979 – February 7, 2017) was an American professional football cornerback in the National Football League for the New York Jets and Dallas Cowboys. He played college football at the University of Kansas.

== Early life ==
Davison initially attended Cody High School, but was expelled as a freshman because of his conduct. He transferred to Chadsey High School, where he began playing football.

He was a two-way player at cornerback and wide receiver. As a senior, he posted 45 tackles, 7 interceptions, 2 fumble recoveries, 48 receptions for 716 yards and 11 touchdowns, while receiving All-Detroit honors. He played on the Shrine High School All-star game.

He also was a sprinter on the track team.

== College career ==
Davison accepted a football scholarship from the University of Kansas. As a true freshman, he started four-of-nine games at cornerback, making 21 tackles. He was known to be one of the most outspoken players on the team.

As a sophomore, he became a full-time starter, posting 53 tackles, 5 passes defensed, 2 forced fumbles and one interception (returned for a touchdown). As a junior, he had one interception (returned for a 40-yard touchdown) and 9 passes defensed.

As a senior, he led the team with 3 interceptions and 12 pass breakups. He was a four-year starter (38-of-43 games), recording 176 tackles, 6 interceptions (2 returned for touchdowns) and 27 passes defensed.

== Professional career ==
=== New York Jets (first stint) ===
Davison was signed as an undrafted free agent by the New York Jets after the 2002 NFL draft. As a rookie, he was a backup cornerback, registering 5 defensive tackles and 6 special teams tackles.

In 2003, he sprained his left ankle in the preseason finale against the Philadelphia Eagles. He was waived with an injury settlement on August 31.

=== Dallas Cowboys ===
On September 18, 2003, he was signed as a free agent by the Dallas Cowboys to provide depth. He was declared inactive for 10 games, until making his debut in the thirteenth game against the Philadelphia Eagles. He played mostly on special teams. In the season finale against the New Orleans Saints, he played on the dime package, but suffered a sprained medial collateral ligament in his right knee. On January 1, he was placed on the injured reserve list, forcing him to miss the Wild Card playoff game against the Carolina Panthers. He had one special teams tackle.

On August 9, 2004, it was reported in the media that he left the team on his own during training camp.

=== New York Jets (second stint) ===
On August 16, 2004, he was signed by the New York Jets as a free agent. He was released on September 5. He was signed to the practice squad on September 6.

On January 24, 2005, he was signed by the New York Jets. He was released on June 2.

== Personal life ==
On February 7, 2017, he died after battling a heart condition for six years. After his junior season in college, he was a victim of a drive-by shooting, that left him with a bullet fragment lodged in his arm.
