= Ivan Stevanović =

Ivan Stevanović may refer to:

- Ivan Stevanović (footballer) (born 1983), Serbian footballer
- Ivan Stevanović (handballer) (born 1982), Croatian handball player
