= Alex Stepanovich =

American football player (born 1981)

No. 71, 69
- Position: Center

Personal information
- Born: September 25, 1981 (age 45); Berea, Ohio, U.S.
- Listed height: 6 ft 4 in (1.93 m)
- Listed weight: 296 lb (134 kg)

Career information
- High school: Berea
- College: Ohio State
- NFL draft: 2004: 4th round, 100th overall pick

Career history
- Arizona Cardinals (2004–2006); Cincinnati Bengals (2007); Atlanta Falcons (2008); Pittsburgh Steelers (2009)*
- * Offseason or practice squad member only

Awards and highlights
- BCS national champion (2002); Third-team All-American (2003); First-team All-Big Ten (2003)

Career NFL statistics
- Games played: 46
- Games started: 34
- Stats at Pro Football Reference

Aleksandar Stepanovich (/stɛˈpɑːnoʊvɪtʃ/ steh-PAHN-o-vitch; born September 25, 1981) is an American former professional football player who was a center in the National Football League (NFL). He was selected by the Arizona Cardinals in the fourth round of the 2004 NFL draft. He played college football for the Ohio State Buckeyes. Stepanovich has also played for the Cincinnati Bengals, Atlanta Falcons, and Pittsburgh Steelers.

== Early life ==
Alex Stepanovich graduated from Berea High School in Berea, Ohio, in 2000.During high school, he participated in football and wrestling, earning All-American recognition in both sports. In Wrestling, he finished as the Ohio state runner-up in 1999 before winning the Division I heavyweight state champion in 2000. He was also nationally ranked during his senior year. In 2023, the Ohio Chapter of the National Wrestling Hall of Fame recognized stepanivich with its "Outstanding American award".

== College career ==
Well respected amongst his teammates, known for his work ethic and toughness, regarded as one of the top centers in college football during 2001 and 2002 at The Ohio State University, he shifted to guard in his senior campaign and started 26 games during his college football career and was an All-Big Ten and All-American performer. A four-year lettermen while at OSU, his career culminated with a Buckeye tree being planted in his honor in Buckeye Grove joining all other first-team All-Americans at OSU.

== Professional career ==
=== Arizona Cardinals ===
The Cardinals selected him in the fourth round of the 2004 NFL draft and Stepanovich moved into the starting lineup. He started every game for the Cardinals in 2004 without missing a single offensive snap and made several All-Rookie teams, along with being the first rookie center in franchise history to start all 16 games. He continued as a starter for much of 2005 and 2006 before going on injured reserve.

The Cardinals elected not to tender him an offer for 2007, making him an unrestricted free agent.

=== Cincinnati Bengals ===
In March, the Cincinnati Bengals signed Stepanovich to a one-year deal for 2007. He played in all 16 games and started 5.

=== Atlanta Falcons ===
On March 10, 2008, Stepanovich was signed by the Atlanta Falcons to a three-year deal. He was released on June 17, 2009.

=== Pittsburgh Steelers ===
Stepanovich signed with the Pittsburgh Steelers on August 10, 2009. He was waived on August 31. Injuries forced his time in Pittsburgh and career short.
