= Amie Stepanovich =

American lawyer

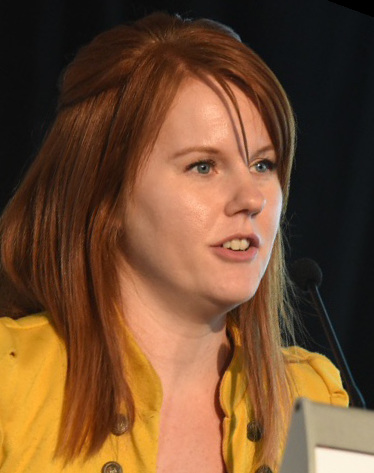
- Stepanovich in 2018
- Born: Amie Louise Stepanovich
- Education: Florida State University (B.S.); New York Law School (J.D.)
- Occupation: Attorney
- Employer: Future of Privacy Forum
- Known for: Drone surveillance, cybersecurity, privacy law
- Awards: Forbes Magazine's 30 Under 30 Leaders in Law and Policy (2014); Privacy Ambassador (Information and Privacy Commissioner of Ontario, Canada)

Amie Stepanovich is a lawyer specializing in cybersecurity, privacy law and drone surveillance. She was the executive director of Silicon Flatirons, a research center at University of Colorado Boulder. from 2019 to 2021. She is vice-president of US policy at the Future of Privacy Forum.

== Education ==
Stepanovich attended Florida State University where she earned a Bachelor of Science in communications. She received her Juris Doctor degree from New York Law School in May 2010. There, she served as editor-in-chief of the New York Law School Media Law & Policy journal. Upon graduation, she served as a law clerk at the Legal Aid Society, the Media Law Resource Center, and T-Systems North America, Inc. Stepanovich passed the New York State bar examination in July 2010.
