= Larry Croom =

American football player (born 1981)

Profile
- Position: Running back

Personal information
- Born: October 29, 1981 (age 45); Long Beach, California, U.S.
- Listed height: 5 ft 10 in (1.78 m)
- Listed weight: 201 lb (91 kg)

Career information
- College: Arizona; UNLV

Career history
- 2004: Arizona Cardinals
- 2005: Hamburg Sea Devils
- 2005: Tennessee Titans*
- 2005: Detroit Lions*
- 2006: San Diego Chargers*
- 2006: Amsterdam Admirals
- 2007: Pittsburgh Steelers*
- 2011–2012: Dresden Monarchs
- 2013–2016: Berlin Adler
- * Offseason or practice squad member only
- Stats at Pro Football Reference

Larry Croom (born October 29, 1981) is an American former professional football player who was a running back in the National Football League (NFL). Croom played for Long Beach Polytechnic High School and then played college football for the Arizona Wildcats before transferring to the UNLV Rebels. He also played professionally in the German Football League.

Originally signed as a free agent for the Arizona Cardinals, he saw little playing time before being cut. He played briefly for the Hamburg Sea Devils, and was on the practice squads of the Tennessee Titans, the Detroit Lions, and the San Diego Chargers before playing for the Steelers.

Croom played in the German Football League for five seasons with the Dresden Monarchs and Berlin Adler.
