= Stevanović =

Stevanović (Serbian Cyrillic: Стевановић, pronounced [steʋǎːnoʋitɕ]) is a Serbian surname, derived from the male given name Stevan (Stephen). It may refer to:

- Alen Stevanović (born 1991), Swiss-born Serbian footballer
- Borislav Stevanović (1975–2022), Serbian footballer
- Dalibor Stevanović (born 1984), Slovenian footballer
- Dušan Stevanović, multiple people
- Filip Stevanović (born 2002), Serbian footballer
- Goran Stevanović (born 1966), Serbian footballer
- Ivan Stevanović, multiple people
- Jovana Stevanović (born 1992), Serbian volleyball player
- Ljubiša Stevanović (1910–1978), Yugoslav footballer
- Mihailo Stevanović (linguist) (1903–1991), Serbian linguist
- Miroslav Stevanović (born 1990), Bosnian footballer
- Natalija Stevanović (born 1994), Serbian tennis player
- Saša Stevanović (born 1974), Serbian footballer
- Vidosav Stevanović, Serbian writer
