= Brendon Ayanbadejo =

American gridiron football player (born 1976)

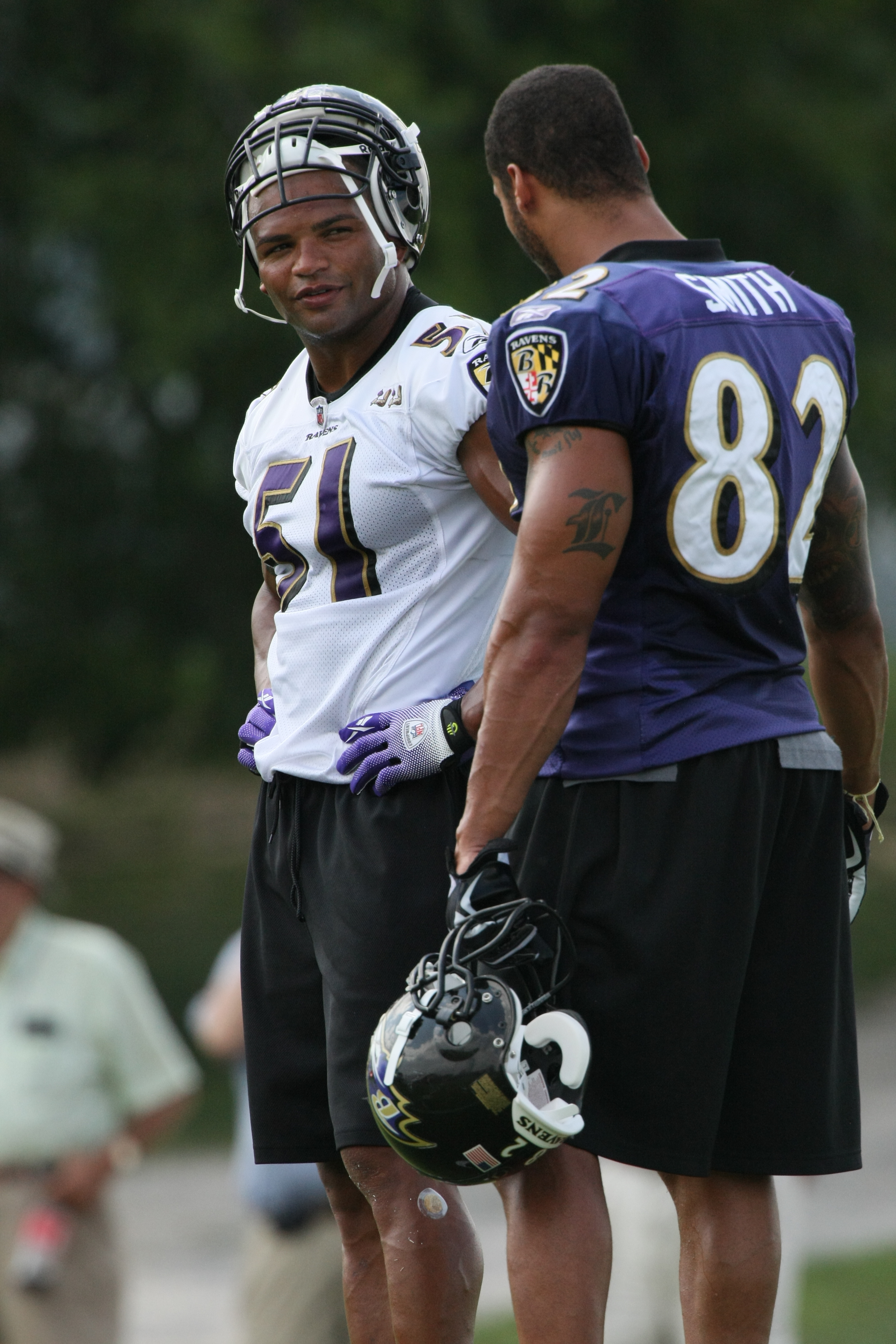
- Ayanbadejo with the Baltimore Ravens in 2009

No. 50, 94, 51
- Positions: Linebacker, special teamer

Personal information
- Born: September 6, 1976 (age 50); Chicago, Illinois, U.S.
- Listed height: 6 ft 1 in (1.85 m)
- Listed weight: 225 lb (102 kg)

Career information
- High school: Santa Cruz (Santa Cruz, California)
- College: UCLA
- NFL draft: 1999: undrafted

Career history
- Atlanta Falcons (1999)*; Chicago Bears (2000)*; Winnipeg Blue Bombers (2000); Toronto Argonauts (2000); Los Angeles Xtreme (2001); Baltimore Ravens (2001)*; Amsterdam Admirals (2001); BC Lions (2002); Miami Dolphins (2003–2004); Chicago Bears (2005–2007); Baltimore Ravens (2008–2012)
- * Offseason or practice squad member only

Awards and highlights
- Super Bowl champion (XLVII); 2× First-team All-Pro (2006, 2008); 3× Pro Bowl (2006–2008); First-team All-Pac-10 (1998); CFL: CFL All-Star (2002)

Career NFL statistics
- Total tackles: 254
- Sacks: 4.5
- Forced fumbles: 4
- Fumble recoveries: 9
- Interceptions: 2
- Stats at Pro Football Reference

Oladele Brendon Ayanbadejo(/ˈbrɛndən ˌaɪ.ənbəˈdeɪdʒoʊ/; born September 6, 1976) is an American former professional football player who was a linebacker and special teamer who played in the National Football League (NFL) and Canadian Football League (CFL) for 13 seasons. He played college football for the UCLA Bruins. He was signed by the Atlanta Falcons as an undrafted free agent in 1999.

Ayanbadejo was selected to the Pro Bowl three times as a special teams player. He was also twice named a first-team All-Pro by the Pro Football Writers of America. He was a member of the Baltimore Ravens, Chicago Bears and Miami Dolphins of the NFL, the Amsterdam Admirals of NFL Europe, and the Winnipeg Blue Bombers, Toronto Argonauts, and BC Lions of the CFL.

== Early life ==
Ayanbadejo was born in Chicago to a Nigerian father and an American mother of Irish descent. His name "Oladele" is the Yoruba translation for "Wealth comes home." He has one older brother, Obafemi Ayanbadejo, who was also a professional football player. Shortly after his birth, the family moved to Nigeria, but after his parents separated he returned to the United States with his mother, settling in Chicago and then Santa Cruz, California. He attended Santa Cruz High School, where he played as a tight end.

== College career ==
For college, Ayanbadejo enrolled at the University of California, Los Angeles, where he played college football for the UCLA Bruins. He was first-team all-Pac-10 his senior season with four sacks against arch-rival USC's Carson Palmer. He majored in history. Ayanbadejo was one of 15 players on UCLA's late 1990s teams involved in the handicapped parking placard scandal.

== Professional career ==
Pre-draft measurables
Height	Weight	40-yard dash	10-yard split	20-yard split	20-yard shuttle	Three-cone drill	Vertical jump	Broad jump	Bench press
6 ft 1 in (1.85 m)	234 lb (106 kg)	4.57 s	1.63 s	2.66 s	4.36 s	7.57 s	36 in (0.91 m)	9 ft 9 in (2.97 m)	30 reps
All values from NFL Combine

=== Early career ===
Ayanbadejo was originally signed by the Atlanta Falcons of the National Football League as an undrafted free agent on April 23, 1999. He served on the practice squad of the Falcons and Chicago Bears before being picked up by the Winnipeg Blue Bombers of the Canadian Football League in 2000, spending time with them and the Toronto Argonauts. He played the 2001 season with the Amsterdam Admirals of NFL Europe and played for the BC Lions of the CFL in 2002. For September 2002, the CFL named Ayanbadejo the Defensive Player of the Month for recording two interceptions, six special team tackles, 21 defensive tackles, one pass deflected, and two recovered fumbles.

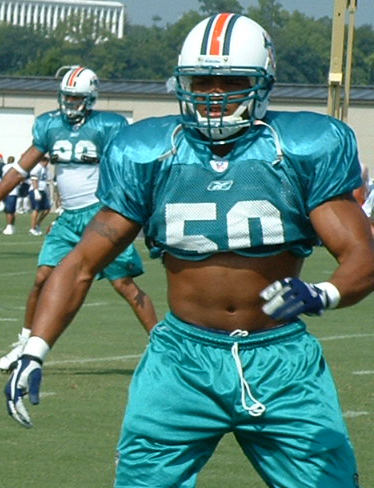
Ayanbadejo with the Dolphins in 2003

=== Miami Dolphins ===
In 2003, he returned to the NFL as a member of the Miami Dolphins. In 2004, Ayanbadejo made a play that led to one of the biggest upset comebacks in Monday Night Football history. While getting sacked, New England Patriots quarterback Tom Brady threw the ball up for grabs. Ayanbadejo caught it for the interception, and the Dolphins went on to win the game by one point.

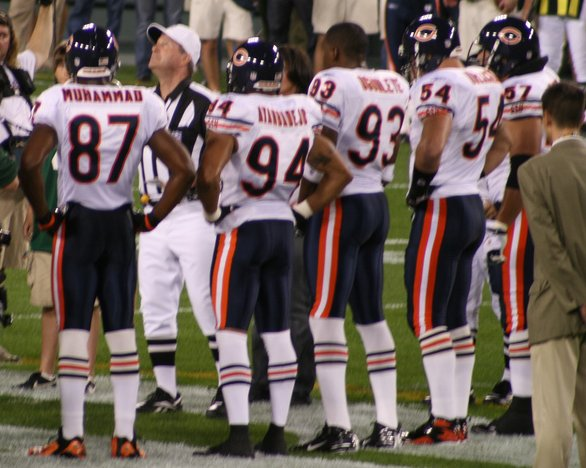
Ayanbadejo (#94) as a Bears captain in 2007.

=== Chicago Bears ===
During the 2005 offseason, Ayanbadejo was traded to the Chicago Bears. Ayanbadejo was selected to consecutive Pro Bowls as a special teamer in 2006 and 2007.

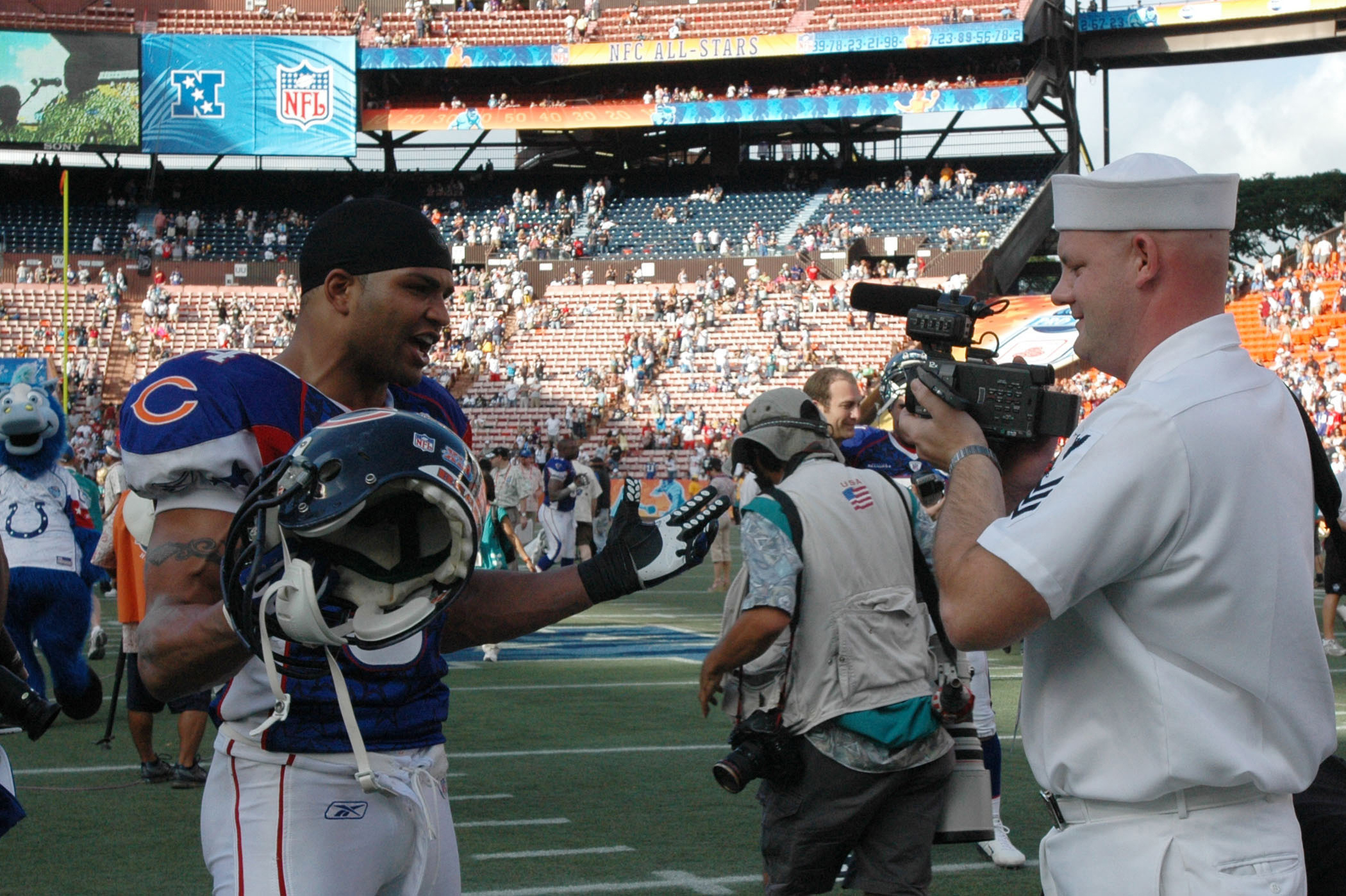
Ayanbadejo talking with a sailor at the 2008 Pro Bowl.

=== Baltimore Ravens (second stint) ===
On March 6, 2008, Ayanbadejo signed a four-year, $4.9 million contract with the Baltimore Ravens. The contract included a $1.9 million signing bonus. He again made the Pro Bowl that season for his special teams contributions. In 2009, Ayanbadejo began to contribute more on the Ravens defense. In week three against the Cleveland Browns, Ayanbadejo recorded six tackles, one of which was for a loss, a sack, and an interception. For his effort, he was awarded AFC Defensive Player of the Week (Week 3). In week 4 against the Patriots, Brendon tore a quadriceps muscle. He said after the game he could miss the rest of the year and was placed on the injured reserve list two days later.

On October 24, 2011, Ayanbadejo was ejected from a game for striking Jacksonville Jaguars offensive lineman Guy Whimper in the face.

In 2013, Ayanbadejo helped the Ravens defeat Indianapolis and Denver in the playoffs, and move on to defeat the New England Patriots in the AFC Championship game. The Ravens' season culminated in New Orleans on February 3, 2013, when they defeated the San Francisco 49ers 34–31 in Super Bowl XLVII, making Ayanbadejo a Super Bowl champion. He started only three games for the Ravens during the 2012 season, spending most of his time on special teams.

Ayanbadejo was released by the Ravens on April 3, 2013.

=== NFL statistics ===
Year	Team	GP	COMB	TOTAL	AST	SACK	FF	FR	FR YDS	INT	IR YDS	AVG IR	LNG	TD	PD
2003	MIA	16	17	10	7	0.0	0	0	0	0	0	0	0	0	0
2004	MIA	16	40	23	17	0.0	0	0	0	1	2	2	2	0	1
2005	CHI	16	26	21	5	0.0	1	0	0	0	0	0	0	0	0
2006	CHI	16	26	23	3	0.0	1	2	0	0	0	0	0	0	0
2007	CHI	16	21	19	2	0.0	2	0	0	0	0	0	0	0	0
2008	BAL	16	19	15	4	1.0	0	0	0	0	0	0	0	0	0
2009	BAL	4	22	19	3	1.0	0	0	0	1	0	0	0	0	1
2010	BAL	10	3	2	1	0.0	1	0	0	0	0	0	0	0	0
2011	BAL	16	35	31	4	1.5	0	0	0	0	0	0	0	0	2
2012	BAL	16	43	27	16	1.0	0	1	0	0	0	0	0	0	1
Career		142	252	190	62	4.5	5	3	0	2	2	1	2	0	5

== Broadcasting ==
In August 2013, Ayanbadejo was hired by Fox Sports as an analyst for Fox Football Daily on Fox Sports 1. He also serves as an occasional game analyst on NFL on Fox coverage.

== LGBT rights advocacy ==
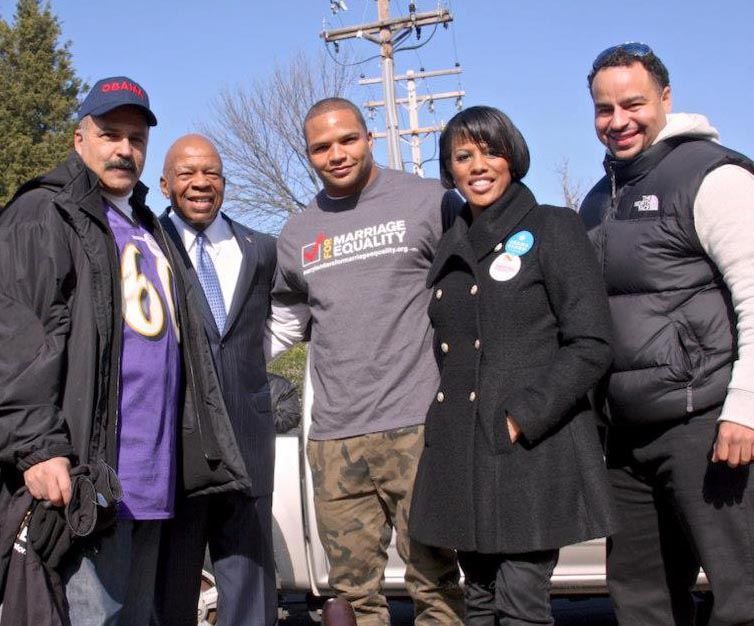
Ayanbadejo on election day 2012 at a polling place in Baltimore with (l-r) Delegate Curt Anderson, Congressman Elijah Cummings, Mayor Stephanie Rawlings-Blake, and businessman Curtis Anderson, campaigning for marriage equality

In 2009, Ayanbedejo began advocating for the legalization of same-sex marriage. His advocacy gained him rather sudden fame in September 2012, after Maryland State Delegate Emmett C. Burns Jr. wrote an August 29, 2012, letter to Baltimore Ravens owner Steve Bisciotti, on official Maryland State letterhead, demanding that Bisciotti "take the necessary action ... to inhibit such expressions from your employee." Burns' letter went on to state that, "I know of no other NFL player who has done what Mr. Ayanbadejo is doing." Burns' letter was widely criticized as an effort to infringe on Ayanbadejo's right to free speech.

According to The Washington Post, the Ravens acknowledged receiving the letter but had no further comment. Shortly after the Burns letter was delivered, Ayanbedejo publicly announced, as the son of interracial parents whose own marriage would have been illegal in 16 states prior to the U.S. Supreme Court's landmark Loving v. Virginia decision in 1967, he had no intention of remaining silent on an issue of conscience and public importance. Ayanbadejo has since said that he has received widespread support in the world of football. Among others, Minnesota Vikings punter Chris Kluwe wrote a scathing response to Burns, while the Ravens also publicly sided with Ayanbadejo. In February 2013, Ayanbadejo and Kluwe filed a joint amicus brief with the Supreme Court in support of same-sex marriage, particularly in the case dealing with California Proposition 8.

By April 2013, it was widely rumored a male professional athlete would come out. Ayanbadejo, at this point an unofficial spokesperson for gay acceptance in sports, openly discussed working with a number of closeted active players in several sports. There were discussions of facilitating meetings between these athletes from across a variety of sports. Later that month, Ayanbadejo spoke in support of NBA player Jason Collins, who became the first publicly gay active athlete to play in any of four major North American pro sports leagues.

== Personal life ==
He is the younger brother of former fullback Obafemi Ayanbadejo. The two were teammates on the Miami Dolphins in 2003. They were on the same team again in 2007, this time the Chicago Bears. The elder Ayanbadejo was cut by the Chicago Bears on October 1, 2007, after he finished serving his four-game suspension for violating the NFL banned substances policy.

Throughout his first several years in the NFL, Ayanbadejo wrote for the Santa Cruz Sentinel. He has advocated for the passage of the FIT Kids Act, federal legislation that would require school districts to report on students' physical activity and to give young people health and nutritional information.

Ayenbadejo received his Executive MBA from George Washington University in 2013.

== See also ==
- Homosexuality in American football
