= Obafemi Ayanbadejo =

American football player (born 1975)

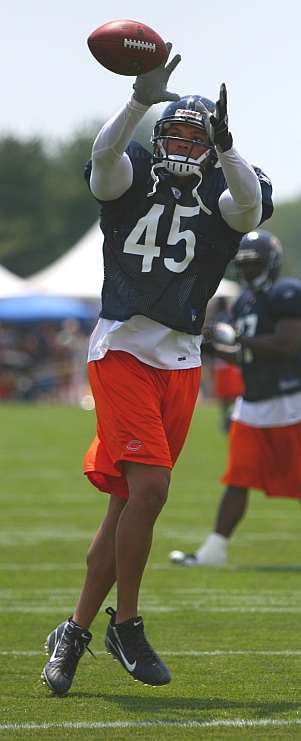
- Ayanbadejo catches a pass at the Chicago Bears 2007 Training Camp

No. 44, 30, 49
- Position: Fullback

Personal information
- Born: March 5, 1975 (age 51); Chicago, Illinois, U.S.
- Listed height: 6 ft 2 in (1.88 m)
- Listed weight: 237 lb (108 kg)

Career information
- High school: Santa Cruz (Santa Cruz, California)
- College: Cabrillo (1993–1994); San Diego State (1995–1996)
- NFL draft: 1997: undrafted

Career history
- Minnesota Vikings (1997–1999); → England Monarchs (1999); Baltimore Ravens (1999–2001); Miami Dolphins (2003); Arizona Cardinals (2004–2006); Chicago Bears (2007); California Redwoods (2009)

Awards and highlights
- Super Bowl champion (XXXV)

Career NFL statistics
- Rushing yards: 413
- Rushing average: 3.4
- Rushing touchdowns: 5
- Receptions: 130
- Receiving yards: 885
- Receiving touchdowns: 3
- Stats at Pro Football Reference

Obafemi Devin Ayanbadejo (/ˌoʊbəˈfɛmi ˌaɪ.ənbəˈdeɪdʒoʊ/; born March 5, 1975) is an American former professional football player who was a fullback, and special teams player in the National Football League (NFL) and United Football League (UFL). He was signed by the Minnesota Vikings as an undrafted free agent in 1997. In 1998 as a member of the Vikings, he was allocated to the England Monarchs of the NFL Europe. Ayanbadejo also played for the Baltimore Ravens (1999–2002), Miami Dolphins (2002–2003), Arizona Cardinals 2004–2007), and Chicago Bears (2007) of the NFL, as well as the California Redwoods (2009) of the UFL. He played college football at San Diego State.

Ayanbadejo earned a Super Bowl ring with the 2000 Ravens via Super Bowl XXXV. He is the older brother of NFL linebacker Brendon Ayanbadejo.

== Early life ==
Ayanbadejo was born in Chicago, Illinois to a Nigerian father and an American mother of Irish descent. His family moved to Santa Cruz, California just after his 11th birthday. He attended Mission Hill Junior High. As a high schooler he played football, baseball and basketball at Santa Cruz High School.

== College career ==
Ayanbadejo played at San Diego State University where he was used as a tight end, receiver and out of the backfield. Prior to attending SDSU he began his college career as a two-sport athlete playing football and baseball at Cabrillo College in Aptos, California. He was all-Coast conference in both sports.

== Professional career ==
=== Minnesota Vikings ===
Following his collegiate career at San Diego State, Ayanbadejo was signed as an undrafted free agent by the Vikings. He was cut by the team before the season began and did not play football that year. However, he was resigned by the Vikings in January, of 1998 and allocated to the London Monarchs of NFL Europe. That fall he resumed his Viking career where he spent time on both the practice squad and active roster. In 1999 he began the season on the Vikings active roster and was cut after week 3. He signed with the Baltimore Ravens in week 4 of the 1999 season.

=== Baltimore Ravens ===
Ayanbadejo was signed by the Baltimore Ravens in week 4 of the 1999 season after his week 3 release by the Vikings. He remained in Baltimore until Ayanbadejo was released by the Ravens after the 2001 season. His official release was in March 2002.

After a late signing with the Miami Dolphins in June 2002 he was the final roster cut at the end of training camp and failed to sign with another team, he sat out the 2002 NFL season.

=== Miami Dolphins ===
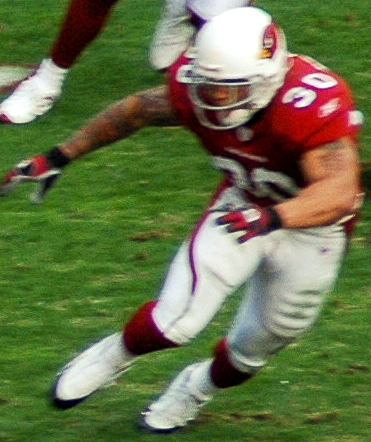
Ayanbadejo with the Cardinals in 2005

Ayanbadejo signed with the Miami Dolphins in 2003, appearing in 16 games (two starts) and catching 12 passes for 53 yards. His brother, Brendon Ayanbadejo, was a linebacker for the Dolphins that season.

=== Arizona Cardinals ===
In March 2004 Ayanbadejo signed a three-year deal with the Arizona Cardinals where he was reunited with head coach Dennis Green. He appeared in all but three games over that three year time period and was voted NFL player representative by his teammates. After playing out that contract, the Cardinals re-signed Obafemi Ayanbadejo to a two-year extension, though he was cut three months later.

=== Chicago Bears ===
Ayanbadejo signed with the Chicago Bears in 2007, becoming professional teammates with his younger brother, Brendon, for the third time in their careers.

In August 2007, Ayanbadejo was suspended for the first four games of the 2007 season after testing positive for a banned substance. Ayanbadejo's failed drug test was attributed to a tainted supplement and the company responsible settled with Ayanbadejo before the case went to trial. Ayanbadejo was the second player in NFL history to bring suit against a supplement company. Following his suspension, he was released from the Bears' roster.

=== California Redwoods ===
Ayanbadejo was drafted by the California Redwoods of the United Football League in the UFL Premiere Season Draft in 2009. He signed with the team on August 18. Ayanbadejo officially retired in January 2010.

== Personal life ==
Ayanbadejo is the older brother of former NFL linebacker Brendon Ayanbadejo.

He went on to get an MBA from the Carey Business School at Johns Hopkins University.
