= Stepanović =

Stepanović (Serbian Cyrillic: Степановић, pronounced [stepǎːnoʋitɕ]) is a Serbian surname, derived from the male given name Stepan (Stephen). Notable people with the surname include:

- Aleksandra Stepanović (born 1994), Serbian volleyball player
- Aleksa Stepanović (born 1998), Serbian basketball player
- Bojan Stepanović (born 1983), Serbian footballer
- Dragoslav Stepanović (born 1948), Serbian football manager and former player
- Katarina Stepanović (born 1985), Serbian handball player
- Ognjeslav Kostović Stepanović (1851–1916), Serbian-Russian inventor
- Stepa Stepanović (1856–1929), Serbian field marshal
- Uroš Stepanović (born 1993), Serbian footballer
