= 2001 New York Giants season =

NFL team season

- Owner: Wellington Mara; Robert Tisch
- General manager: Ernie Accorsi
- Head coach: Jim Fassel
- Home stadium: Giants Stadium

Results
- Record: 7–9
- Division place: 3rd NFC East
- Playoffs: Did not qualify
- Pro Bowlers: 3: G Ron Stone; DE Michael Strahan; LB Jessie Armstead

Uniform
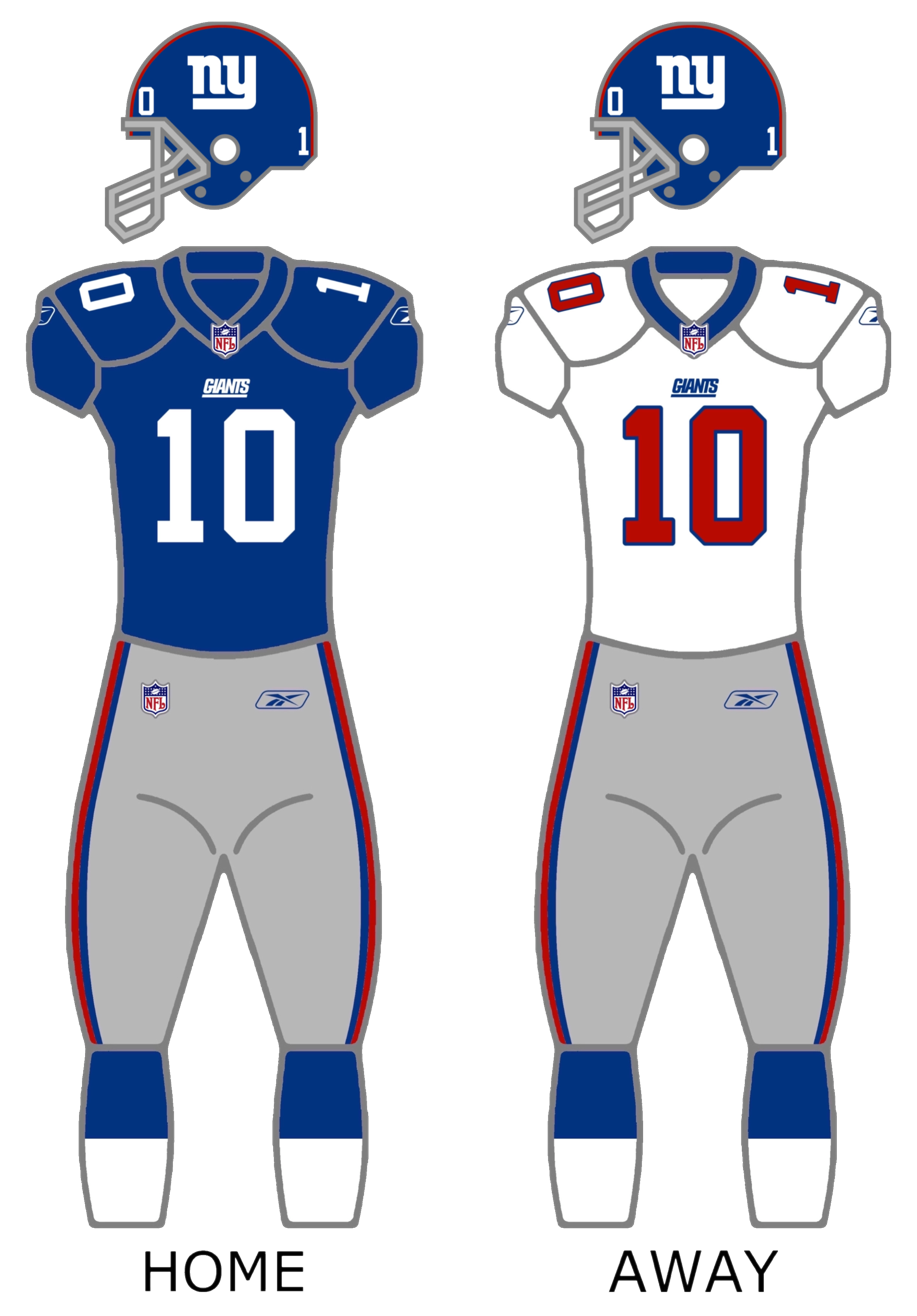

The 2001 season was the New York Giants' 77th in the National Football League (NFL) and the fifth under head coach Jim Fassel. They were returning as Super Bowl runners-up from the 2000 season, after losing Super Bowl XXXV to the Baltimore Ravens. The Giants tried to improve on their 12–4 record from the previous year, instead they finished 7–9 and missed the playoffs for the first time since 1999. However, Michael Strahan was named Defensive Player of the Year for the 2001 season. He broke the NFL single season sack record with 22.5, surpassing Mark Gastineau's total of 22, by sacking Brett Favre of the Green Bay Packers at Giants Stadium in the final regular-season game. Following the season, defensive coordinator John Fox left to become the head coach of the Carolina Panthers, a team he would take to the Super Bowl just two years later.

== Offseason ==
Additions	Subtractions
K Morten Andersen (Falcons)	K Brad Daluiso (Raiders)
DE Kenny Holmes (Titans)	DE Cedric Jones (Rams)
	DT Christian Peter (Colts)
	P Brad Maynard (Bears)
	TE Pete Mitchell (Lions)
	LB Pete Monty (Vikings)
	LB Ryan Phillips (Colts)

=== NFL draft ===
2001 New York Giants draft
Round	Pick	Player	Position	College	Notes
1	22	Will Allen	CB	Syracuse	
3	78	Will Peterson	CB	Western Illinois	
4	114	Cedric Scott	DE	Southern Miss	
4	125	Jesse Palmer	QB	Florida	
5	160	John Markham	K	Vanderbilt	
5	162	Jonathan Carter	WR	Troy State	
7	230	Ross Kolodziej	DT	Wisconsin	
Made roster † Pro Football Hall of Fame * Made at least one Pro Bowl during career

=== Undrafted free agents ===
2001 undrafted free agents of note
Player	Position	College
Marcellus Rivers	TE	Oklahoma State
Brady McDonnell	TE	Colorado
Rich Seubert	G	Western Illinois
Lance Legree	DT	Notre Dame
Clayton White	LB	NC State

== Staff ==
2001 New York Giants staff
Front office: President, co-CEO – Wellington Mara; Chairman, co-CEO – Preston Robert Tisch; General manager – Ernie Accorsi; Head coaches: Head coach – Jim Fassel; Offensive coaches: Offensive coordinator/quarterbacks – Sean Payton; Running backs – Eric Studesville; Wide receivers – Jimmy Robinson; Tight ends – Mike Pope; Offensive assistant – Jay Robertson	Defensive coaches: Defensive coordinator – John Fox; Defensive quality control – Dave Brazil; Defensive line – Denny Marcin; Linebackers – Tom Olivadotti; Secondary – Johnnie Lynn; Special teams coaches: Special teams coordinator – Fred von Appen; Strength and conditioning – John Dunn; Assistant strength and conditioning – Craig Stoddard

== Roster ==
2001 New York Giants roster
Quarterbacks (QB): 5 Kerry Collins; 17 Jason Garrett; 3 Jesse Palmer; Running backs (RB): 21 Tiki Barber KR; 34 Greg Comella FB; 27 Ron Dayne; 29 Damon Washington; Wide receivers (WR): 85 Jonathan Carter KR; 82 Thabiti Davis; 86 Ron Dixon KR; 88 Ike Hilliard; 84 Joe Jurevicius; 81 Amani Toomer PR; Tight ends (TE): 89 Dan Campbell; 87 Howard Cross; 83 Marcellus Rivers	Offensive linemen (OL): 67 Chris Bober C; 76 Lomas Brown T; 62 Glenn Parker G; 77 Luke Petitgout T; 78 Mike Rosenthal G; 69 Rich Seubert G; 65 Ron Stone G; 66 Jason Whittle G; 52 Dusty Zeigler C; Defensive linemen (DL): 95 Frank Ferrara DE; 97 Cornelius Griffin DT; 75 Keith Hamilton DT; 90 Kenny Holmes DE; 99 Ross Kolodziej DT; 70 Lance Legree DT; 96 Cedric Scott DE; 92 Michael Strahan DE	Linebackers (LB): 98 Jessie Armstead OLB; 58 Micheal Barrow MLB; 51 Jack Golden OLB; 55 Dhani Jones OLB; 59 Kevin Lewis MLB; 53 Brandon Short OLB; 57 Clayton White OLB; Defensive backs (DB): 25 Will Allen CB; 22 Ralph Brown CB; 20 Sam Garnes SS; 35 Clarence LeBlanc SS; 26 Emmanuel McDaniel CB; 28 DeWayne Patmon SS; 24 Will Peterson CB; 23 Omar Stoutmire FS; 41 Dave Thomas CB; 36 Shaun Williams FS; Special teams (ST): 8 Morten Andersen K; 9 Owen Pochman K; 2 Rodney Williams P	Practice squad: 49 Taman Bryant TE; 91 Jamie Carter DT; 44 Anthony Green RB; 94 Dwight Johnson DT; 74 Chris Ziemann T; Reserve: 46 Lloyd Clemons RB (IR); 63 Jim Goff T (IR); 45 Brady McDonnell TE (IR); 33 Joe Montgomery RB (PUP); 31 Jason Sehorn CB (IR); 38 Adam Wright FB (IR); Rookies in italics 53 active, 6 reserve, 5 practice squad

== Preseason ==
Week	Date	Opponent	Result	Record	Venue	Recap
1	August 10	at New England Patriots	L 0–14	0–1	Foxboro Stadium	Recap
2	August 16	Jacksonville Jaguars	W 27–5	1–1	Giants Stadium	Recap
3	August 25	New York Jets	L 14–17	1–2	Giants Stadium	Recap
4	August 31	at Baltimore Ravens	L 9–38	1–3	PSINet Stadium	Recap

== Regular season ==
=== Schedule ===
Week	Date	Opponent	Result	Record	Venue	Recap
1	September 10	at Denver Broncos	**L** 20–31	0–1	Invesco Field at Mile High	Recap
2 (Note: The Giants were originally scheduled to host the Green Bay Packers during Week 2 of the original NFL schedule (September 16) at Giants Stadium. However, due to the September 11 attacks, the game was rescheduled to Week 17.)	September 23	at Kansas City Chiefs	**W** 13–3	1–1	Arrowhead Stadium	Recap
3	September 30	New Orleans Saints	**W** 21–13	2–1	Giants Stadium	Recap
4	October 7	**Washington Redskins**	**W** 23–9	3–1	Giants Stadium	Recap
5	October 14	at St. Louis Rams	**L** 14–15	3–2	Trans World Dome	Recap
6	October 22	**Philadelphia Eagles**	**L** 9–10	3–3	Giants Stadium	Recap
7	October 28	at **Washington Redskins**	**L** 21–35	3–4	FedExField	Recap
8	November 4	**Dallas Cowboys**	**W** 27–24 (OT)	4–4	Giants Stadium	Recap
9	November 11	at **Arizona Cardinals**	**W** 17–10	5–4	Sun Devil Stadium	Recap
10	November 19	at Minnesota Vikings	**L** 16–28	5–5	Hubert H. Humphrey Metrodome	Recap
11	November 25	Oakland Raiders	**L** 10–28	5–6	Giants Stadium	Recap
12	Bye					
13	December 9	at **Dallas Cowboys**	**L** 13–20	5–7	Texas Stadium	Recap
14	December 15	**Arizona Cardinals**	**W** 17–13	6–7	Giants Stadium	Recap
15	December 23	Seattle Seahawks	**W** 27–24	7–7	Giants Stadium	Recap
16	December 30	at **Philadelphia Eagles**	**L** 21–24	7–8	Veterans Stadium	Recap
17	January 6	Green Bay Packers	**L** 25–34	7–9	Giants Stadium	Recap
Note: Intra-division opponents are in **bold** text.

=== Game summaries ===
==== Week 1: at Denver Broncos ====
Week 1: New York Giants at Denver Broncos – game summary

Quarter	1	2	3	4	Total
Giants	0	7	7	6	**20**
**Broncos**	7	7	7	10	**31**

at Invesco Field at Mile High, Denver, Colorado

- Date: September 10
- Game time: 9:00 p.m. EDT/7:00 p.m. MDT
- Game weather: Scattered clouds, 79 °F (26 °C)
- Game attendance: 75,244
- Referee: Bill Athan
- TV announcers (ABC): Al Michaels, Dan Fouts, Dennis Miller, Melissa Stark and Eric Dickerson

Game information

**First quarter**

- DEN – Patrick Hape 1-yard pass from Brian Griese (Jason Elam kick), 1:09. Broncos 7–0. **Drive: 4 plays, 31 yards, 2:03.**

**Second quarter**

- NYG – Amani Toomer 43-yard pass from Kerry Collins (Morten Andersen kick), 12:55. Tied 7–7. **Drive: 7 plays, 74 yards, 3:14.**
- DEN – Ed McCaffrey 16-yard pass from Brian Griese (Jason Elam kick), 9:35. Broncos 14–7. **Drive: 6 plays, 71 yards, 3:20.**

**Third quarter**

- NYG – Amani Toomer 11-yard pass from Kerry Collins (Morten Andersen kick), 10:36. Tied 14–14. **Drive: 8 plays, 80 yards, 4:24.**
- DEN – Rod Smith 25-yard pass from Brian Griese (Jason Elam kick), 7:58. Broncos 21–14. **Drive: 5 plays, 66 yards, 2:38.**

**Fourth quarter**

- DEN – Jason Elam 37-yard field goal, 13:40. Broncos 24–14. **Drive: 8 plays, 56 yards, 2:34.**
- DEN – Mike Anderson 6-yard run (Jason Elam kick), 9:05. Broncos 31–14. **Drive: 5 plays, 77 yards, 2:19.**
- NYG – Marcellus Rivers 1-yard pass from Kerry Collins (kick failed), 1:51. Broncos 31–20. **Drive: 10 plays, 90 yards, 2:01.**

**Top passers**

- NYG – Kerry Collins – 19/34, 258 yards, 3 TD
- DEN – Brian Griese – 21/29, 330 yards, 3 TD

**Top rushers**

- NYG – Ron Dayne – 6 rushes, 30 yards
- DEN – Terrell Davis – 21 rushes, 101 yards

**Top receivers**

- NYG – Amani Toomer – 5 receptions, 78 yards, 2 TD
- DEN – Rod Smith – 9 receptions, 115 yards, TD

The Giants began their NFC title defense on Monday Night Football in the first game at the Denver Broncos' new stadium, Invesco Field at Mile High (now known as Empower Field at Mile High). The Broncos opened the scoring with quarterback Brian Griese finding tight end Patrick Hape for a 1-yard touchdown to make the score 7–0. The teams then went back and forth, with Kerry Collins hitting Amani Toomer for two touchdown passes (one from 43 yards and the other from 11 yards), while Griese threw another touchdown to Ed McCaffrey. However, in the third quarter Griese threw his third touchdown of the day with a 25-yard strike to Rod Smith to give the Broncos a lead they would not relinquish. A 9-yard touchdown in the fourth quarter by running back Mike Anderson clinched the game.

While Kerry Collins went 19 of 34 for 258 yards and 3 touchdowns with no interceptions, the Giants defense allowed 473 yards of total offense and failed to register a sack or force a turnover.

==== Week of Sunday, September 16: no games ====
After the Monday night loss in Denver, the Giants returned to Newark International Airport around 6 a.m. EDT on the morning of Tuesday, September 11, less than three hours before hijackers ran passenger jets into the World Trade Center in Lower Manhattan, causing them to collapse. Another aircraft, United Airlines Flight 93, had been at the gate next to the team charter before crashing in Pennsylvania en route to attack the United States Capitol in Washington, D.C. In the aftermath of the attacks, co-owner Wellington Mara advocated for postponement of the following week's games, including the Giants' home opener with the Green Bay Packers. According to current team president John Mara, many fans were still awaiting word on family members who worked in the towers, and his father regretted the NFL holding games only two days after President John F. Kennedy's assassination in 1963. Week 2's games would ultimately be rescheduled as the regular season finale.

==== Week 2: at Kansas City Chiefs ====
Week 2: New York Giants at Kansas City Chiefs – game summary

Quarter	1	2	3	4	Total
**Giants**	3	10	0	0	**13**
Chiefs	0	0	3	0	**3**

at Arrowhead Stadium, Kansas City, Missouri

- Date: September 23
- Game time: 1:00 p.m. EDT/12:00 p.m. CDT
- Game weather: Overcast, 64 °F (18 °C)
- Game attendance: 77,666
- Referee: Tom White
- TV announcers (Fox): Sam Rosen, Bill Maas and Jim Hayes

Game information

**First quarter**

- NYG – Morten Andersen 42-yard field goal, 12:20. Giants 3–0. **Drive: 6 plays, 11 yards, 1:35.**

**Second quarter**

- NYG – Ron Dayne 7-yard run (Morten Andersen kick), 14:55. Giants 10–0. **Drive: 9 plays, 80 yards, 4:51.**
- NYG – Morten Andersen 34-yard field goal, 0:00. Giants 13–0. **Drive: 7 plays, 42 yards, 1:04.**

**Third quarter**

- KC – Todd Peterson 33-yard field goal, 6:15. Giants 13–3. **Drive: 9 plays, 67 yards, 4:31.**

**Fourth quarter**

- No scoring plays.

**Top passers**

- NYG – Kerry Collins – 20/34, 208 yards, 3 INT
- KC – Trent Green – 17/34, 184 yards, INT

**Top rushers**

- NYG – Ron Dayne – 16 rushes, 46 yards, TD
- KC – Tony Richardson – 9 rushes, 41 yards

**Top receivers**

- NYG – Joe Jurevicius – 7 receptions, 90 yards
- KC – Chris Thomas – 4 receptions, 62 yards

The first game the Giants played after 9/11, and the first game either New York City team played after the attacks, was an interconference game at Kansas City. Chiefs players joined Giants players before the game to honor those who had lost their lives and those who had been seriously impacted by the crisis.

When the two teams got back to football, what ensued was a sloppy and low-scoring game. Running back Ron Dayne scored the game's only touchdown with a 7-yard run in the second quarter, and the Giants led 13–0 at the half. Kerry Collins reversed his performance from his last game with no touchdowns and 3 interceptions, but the Chiefs failed to turn any of his turnovers into points. The Giants finally clinched the game with a 13-play drive that took up the remaining 7:21 of the clock.

==== Week 3: vs. New Orleans Saints ====
Week 3: New Orleans Saints at New York Giants – game summary

Quarter	1	2	3	4	Total
Saints	0	3	0	10	**13**
**Giants**	0	14	0	7	**21**

at Giants Stadium, East Rutherford, New Jersey

- Date: September 30
- Game time: 1:00 p.m. EDT
- Game weather: Overcast, 55 °F (13 °C)
- Game attendance: 78,451
- Referee: Terry McAulay
- TV announcers (Fox): Dick Stockton, Troy Aikman, Daryl Johnston and Pam Oliver

Game information

**First quarter**

- No scoring plays.

**Second quarter**

- NYG – Ron Dayne 6-yard run (Morten Andersen kick), 7:52. Giants 7–0. **Drive: 6 plays, 81 yards, 2:02.**
- NYG – Tiki Barber 14-yard run (Morten Andersen kick), 3:31. Giants 14–0. **Drive: 5 plays, 51 yards, 2:46.**
- NO – John Carney 32-yard field goal, 0:01. Giants 14–3. **Drive: 11 plays, 50 yards, 3:30.**

**Third quarter**

- No scoring plays.

**Fourth quarter**

- NO – Willie Jackson 32-yard pass from Aaron Brooks (John Carney kick), 7:48. Giants 14–10. **Drive: 7 plays, 64 yards, 2:39.**
- NYG – Joe Jurevicius 46-yard pass from Kerry Collins (Morten Andersen kick), 6:05. Giants 21–10. **Drive: 3 plays, 40 yards, 1:43.**
- NO – John Carney 30-yard field goal, 4:36. Giants 21–13. **Drive: 5 plays, 46 yards, 1:29.**

**Top passers**

- NO – Aaron Brooks – 28/54, 291 yards, TD, INT
- NYG – Kerry Collins – 9/18, 135 yards, TD

**Top rushers**

- NO – Ricky Williams – 16 rushes, 53 yards
- NYG – Ron Dayne – 19 rushes, 111 yards, TD

**Top receivers**

- NO – Willie Jackson – 8 receptions, 105 yards, TD
- NYG – Joe Jurevicius – 2 receptions, 60 yards, TD

The Giants' home opener of the 2001 season came against New Orleans. It was the first NFL game held in the New York City metropolitan area after 9/11.

After a scoreless first quarter, the Giants opened the scoring in the second quarter with Ron Dayne running in for a 6-yard touchdown. Tiki Barber added his first touchdown of the year on their next drive, a 14-yard run which made the score 14–3 at the half. In the fourth quarter, Saints quarterback Aaron Brooks threw a 32-yard touchdown pass to wide receiver Willie Jackson to make the score 14–10, but the Giants answered with Kerry Collins finding Joe Jurevicius for a 46-yard touchdown to make it 21–10 with 6:05 to go. Saints kicker John Carney kicked a 30-yard field goal to narrow the score to 21–13 with 4:36 remaining, then Collins lost a fumble to give the Saints the ball back at their own 30-yard line with 3:17 to go. Brooks drove the Saints to the 9-yard line with 15 seconds left. After spiking the ball, two incomplete passes brought up 4th and Goal from the 9-yard line on the final play of the game. Brooks completed a pass to Jackson for what appeared to be a touchdown, but the officials ruled that Jackson had committed pass interference in order to make the catch, and the game ended.

The Giants won despite being outgained 330–253. Ron Dayne ran for 111 yards on 19 carries with a touchdown while Michael Strahan registered his first three sacks of his record-breaking season.

==== Week 4: vs. Washington Redskins ====
Week 4: Washington Redskins at New York Giants – game summary

Quarter	1	2	3	4	Total
Redskins	3	3	3	0	**9**
**Giants**	3	6	0	14	**23**

at Giants Stadium, East Rutherford, New Jersey

- Date: October 7
- Game time: 1:00 p.m. EDT
- Game weather: Partly cloudy, 57 °F (14 °C)
- Game attendance: 78,651
- Referee: Johnny Grier
- TV announcers (Fox): Sam Rosen, Bill Maas and Mike Crispino

Game information

**First quarter**

- NYG – Morten Andersen 50-yard field goal, 6:41. Giants 3–0. **Drive: 8 plays, 29 yards, 3:47.**
- WAS – Brett Conway 35-yard field goal, 3:28. Tied 3–3. **Drive: 4 plays, 3 yards, 1:30.**

**Second quarter**

- NYG – Morten Andersen 26-yard field goal, 14:09. Giants 6–3. **Drive: 4 plays, 6 yards, 1:03.**
- WAS – Brett Conway 55-yard field goal, 11:25. Tied 6–6. **Drive: 6 plays, 18 yards, 2:44.**
- NYG – Morten Andersen 22-yard field goal, 0:40. Giants 9–6. **Drive: 7 plays, 66 yards, 1:41.**

**Third quarter**

- WAS – Brett Conway 41-yard field goal, 3:29. Tied 9–9. **Drive: 7 plays, 40 yards, 2:39.**

**Fourth quarter**

- NYG – Dan Campbell 1-yard pass from Kerry Collins (Morten Andersen kick), 12:59. Giants 16–9. **Drive: 10 plays, 71 yards, 5:30.**
- NYG – Jason Sehorn 34-yard interception return (Morten Andersen kick), 2:57. Giants 23–9.

**Top passers**

- WAS – Tony Banks – 13/31, 151 yards, 2 INT
- NYG – Kerry Collins – 15/29, 177 yards, TD, 2 INT

**Top rushers**

- WAS – Stephen Davis – 12 rushes, 39 yards
- NYG – Damon Washington – 25 rushes, 90 yards

**Top receivers**

- WAS – Rod Gardner – 2 receptions, 68 yards
- NYG – Amani Toomer – 7 receptions, 97 yards

With the Giants hosting a Washington team that had been blasted by their first three opponents by a combined score of 112–16, this game had all the makings of an easy win. However, the score was tied at 9–9 at the end of three quarters with Giants kicker Morten Andersen and Washington kicker Brett Conway trading three field goals apiece. In the fourth quarter, the Giants finally took over. With 12:59 to go, Kerry Collins found tight end Dan Campbell for a 1-yard touchdown pass to give the Giants the lead. Then with 2:57 to go, Jason Sehorn intercepted a Tony Banks pass and returned it 34 yards for the game-clinching score.

The two teams combined for a whopping 9 turnovers, with the Giants committing 4 and Washington committing 5. However, the Giants also held Washington to just 181 yards of total offense.

Amani Toomer led the offense with 7 receptions for 97 yards, while Jason Sehorn intercepted two passes including the aforementioned touchdown. Due to an injury by Tiki Barber and Ron Dayne's disappointing play, reserve running back Damon Washington received considerable playing time in the second half and contributed a career-high 90 yards rushing.\

==== Week 5: at St. Louis Rams ====
Week 5: New York Giants at St. Louis Rams – game summary

Quarter	1	2	3	4	Total
Giants	7	0	0	7	**14**
**Rams**	6	3	0	6	**15**

at The Dome at America's Center, St. Louis, Missouri

- Date: October 14
- Game time: 1:00 p.m. EDT/12:00 p.m. CDT
- Game weather: None (indoor stadium)
- Game attendance: 65,992
- Referee: Gerry Austin
- TV announcers (Fox): Pat Summerall, John Madden and Ron Pitts

Game information

**First quarter**

- NYG – Ron Dayne 4-yard run (Morten Andersen kick), 12:06. Giants 7–0. **Drive: 6 plays, 80 yards, 2:54.**
- STL – Jeff Wilkins 28-yard field goal, 7:58. Giants 7–3. **Drive: 11 plays, 68 yards, 4:08.**
- STL – Jeff Wilkins 33-yard field goal, 0:44. Giants 7–6. **Drive: 7 plays, 50 yards, 4:00.**

**Second quarter**

- STL – Jeff Wilkins 25-yard field goal, 0:00. Rams 9–7. **Drive: 7 plays, 52 yards, 1:44.**

**Third quarter**

- No scoring plays.

**Fourth quarter**

- NYG – Ike Hilliard 25-yard pass from Kerry Collins (Morten Andersen kick), 13:33. Giants 14–9. **Drive: 4 plays, 34 yards, 2:00.**
- STL – Trung Canidate 1-yard run (pass failed), 4:16. Rams 15–14. **Drive: 12 plays, 77 yards, 4:18.**

**Top passers**

- NYG – Kerry Collins – 17/32, 242 yards, TD, 2 INT
- STL – Kurt Warner – 28/46, 316 yards, INT

**Top rushers**

- NYG – Ron Dayne – 20 rushes, 88 yards, TD
- STL – Marshall Faulk – 8 rushes, 25 yards

**Top receivers**

- NYG – Joe Jurevicius – 5 receptions, 93 yards
- STL – Torry Holt – 5 receptions, 83 yards

The Giants then went on the road for a nationally televised day game against the 4–0 Rams. The Greatest Show on Turf had outscored their opponents 127–53 in their first four games and were favored by 10.5 points to win.

To the surprise of many, the Giants' defense held the Rams in check, holding them to a season-low 15 points. They forced 4 turnovers while also sacking Kurt Warner 6 times. Michael Strahan had a dominant game with 4 sacks of Warner.

The Giants opened the game with an 80-yard drive that ended with a Ron Dayne 4-yard touchdown run. The Rams answered with three Jeff Wilkins field goals, the last one of which came as time expired in the first half to give St. Louis a 9–7 lead heading into the locker room. After a scoreless fourth quarter, the Giants capitalized off a Marshall Faulk fumble with Kerry Collins finding Ike Hilliard for a 25-yard touchdown to make the score 14–9 with 13:33 remaining. However, after three quarters of great defense, the team could not hold when it mattered most. The Rams went on a 77-yard drive and advanced to the Giants' 1-yard line after a Sam Garnes pass interference penalty, on a play where Kurt Warner was temporarily knocked out of the game with an injury. Backup Jamie Martin entered the game for one play, which was a 1-yard touchdown run by Trung Canidate to give the Rams a 15–14 lead with 4:17 to go. After a three-and-out, the Giants forced a three-and-out to give their offense one more chance to win the game with 1:51 to go. However, Collins was intercepted by defensive end Grant Wistrom to finally clinch the game for the Rams.

==== Week 6: vs. Philadelphia Eagles ====
Week 6: Philadelphia Eagles at New York Giants – game summary

Quarter	1	2	3	4	Total
**Eagles**	0	0	3	7	**10**
Giants	3	6	0	0	**9**

at Giants Stadium, East Rutherford, New Jersey

- Date: October 22
- Game time: 9:00 p.m. EDT
- Game weather: Overcast, 61 °F (16 °C)
- Game attendance: 78,821
- Referee: Jeff Triplette
- TV announcers (ABC): Al Michaels, Dan Fouts, Dennis Miller, Melissa Stark and Eric Dickerson

Game information

**First quarter**

- NYG – Morten Andersen 24-yard field goal, 3:31. Giants 3–0. **Drive: 15 plays, 64 yards, 8:17.**

**Second quarter**

- NYG – Morten Andersen 21-yard field goal, 12:56. Giants 6–0. **Drive: 11 plays, 39 yards, 5:09.**
- NYG – Morten Andersen 24-yard field goal, 2:14. Giants 9–0. **Drive: 13 plays, 61 yards, 8:28.**

**Third quarter**

- PHI – David Akers 25-yard field goal, 1:34. Giants 9–3. **Drive: 8 plays, 57 yards, 3:32.**

**Fourth quarter**

- PHI – James Thrash 18-yard pass from Donovan McNabb (David Akers kick), 1:52. Eagles 10–9. **Drive: 7 plays, 40 yards, 4:00.**

**Top passers**

- PHI – Donovan McNabb – 15/26, 154 yards, TD, INT
- NYG – Kerry Collins – 21/33, 162 yards

**Top rushers**

- PHI – Donovan McNabb – 6 rushes, 35 yards
- NYG – Tiki Barber – 13 rushes, 55 yards

**Top receivers**

- PHI – James Thrash – 6 receptions, 77 yards
- NYG – Ike Hilliard – 6 receptions, 80 yards

The Giants' next game was a loss to the division-rival Eagles in a Monday Night game. The Giants dominated the first half, but failed to get in the end zone despite two goal-to-go situations and were forced to settle for three Morten Andersen field goals and a 9–0 halftime lead. With 1:52 remaining, Donovan McNabb threw an 18-yard touchdown pass to James Thrash, and the ensuing extra point gave the Eagles their first lead of the night, 10–9. On the next drive, Kerry Collins was sacked and forced to fumble by Jeremiah Trotter, and the Eagles recovered the ball to clinch the game.

==== Week 7: at Washington Redskins ====
Week 7: New York Giants at Washington Redskins – game summary

Quarter	1	2	3	4	Total
Giants	0	14	0	7	**21**
**Redskins**	14	3	10	8	**35**

at FedExField, Landover, Maryland

- Date: October 28
- Game time: 4:05 p.m. EST
- Game weather: Scattered clouds, 50 °F (10 °C)
- Game attendance: 80,316
- Referee: Larry Nemmers
- TV announcers (Fox): Curt Menefee, Brian Baldinger and Dave Feldman

Game information

**First quarter**

- WAS – Rod Gardner 12-yard pass from Tony Banks (Brett Conway kick), 13:18. Redskins 7–0. **Drive: 3 plays, 17 yards, 1:13.**
- WAS – Eric Metcalf 89-yard punt return (Brett Conway kick), 6:06. Redskins 14–0.

**Second quarter**

- NYG – Amani Toomer 6-yard pass from Kerry Collins (Morten Andersen kick), 6:39. Redskins 14–7. **Drive: 7 plays, 65 yards, 2:00.**
- NYG – Ike Hilliard 27-yard pass from Kerry Collins (Morten Andersen kick), 3:04. Tied 14–14. **Drive: 5 plays, 39 yards, 1:26.**
- WAS – Brett Conway 43-yard field goal, 0:00. Redskins 17–14. **Drive: 7 plays, 50 yards, 3:04.**

**Third quarter**

- WAS – Derrius Thompson 31-yard pass from Kevin Lockett (Brett Conway kick), 13:08. Redskins 24–14. **Drive: 4 plays, 60 yards, 1:52.**
- WAS – Brett Conway 20-yard field goal, 3:23. Redskins 27–14. **Drive: 13 plays, 63 yards, 6:54.**

**Fourth quarter**

- NYG – Greg Comella 1-yard pass from Kerry Collins (Morten Andersen kick), 13:58. Redskins 27–21. **Drive: 12 plays, 72 yards, 4:25.**
- WAS – Michael Westbrook 76-yard pass from Tony Banks (Tony Banks–Donnell Bennett pass), 6:41. Redskins 35–21. **Drive: 3 plays, 67 yards, 0:53.**

**Top passers**

- NYG – Kerry Collins – 32/52, 346 yards, 3 TD, INT
- WAS – Tony Banks – 11/19, 190 yards, 2 TD

**Top rushers**

- NYG – Ron Dayne – 8 rushes, 19 yards
- WAS – Stephen Davis – 29 rushes, 107 yards

**Top receivers**

- NYG – Amani Toomer – 9 receptions, 109 yards, TD
- WAS – Michael Westbrook – 2 receptions, 83 yards, TD

After two losses by a point each, the Giants were expected to get back on track at Washington, in a game originally scheduled for 8:30 p.m. before a conflict arose with the New York Yankees in Game 2 of the 2001 World Series as a result of MLB's rescheduling following the September 11 terrorist attacks, necessitating a move to 4:05 p.m. However, they faced a completely different team than the one they beat in Week 4.

On the second play from scrimmage, Kerry Collins lost a fumble on a snap, and Washington capitalized with Tony Banks finding rookie receiver Rod Gardner for a 12-yard touchdown pass. Later in the quarter, Washington punt returner Eric Metcalf returned a punt 89 yards for a touchdown to make it 14–0. The Giants came back to tie the game in the second quarter, with Collins finding Amani Toomer for a 6-yard touchdown and then finding Ike Hilliard for a 27-yard touchdown to tie the score. A 43-yard field goal by Washington kicker Brett Conway made the score 17–14 at the half.

In the third quarter, the Giants were hit hard by a trick play. Receiver Kevin Lockett threw a 31-yard touchdown to Derrius Thompson on an option pass play to make the score 24–14 Washington, and another field goal made the score 27–14 heading into the final quarter. Kerry Collins threw a 1-yard touchdown to fullback Greg Comella to narrow the deficit to 27–21, but Washington clinched the game with Tony Banks finding Michael Westbrook for a 76-yard touchdown.

Although Kerry Collins threw for 346 yards and 3 touchdowns with an interception, Washington outgained the Giants on the ground 157–42.

==== Week 8: vs. Dallas Cowboys ====
Week 8: Dallas Cowboys at New York Giants – game summary

Quarter	1	2	3	4	OT	Total
Cowboys	10	14	0	0	0	**24**
**Giants**	0	7	7	10	3	**27**

at Giants Stadium, East Rutherford, New Jersey

- Date: November 4
- Game time: 1:00 p.m. EST
- Game weather: Scattered clouds, 61 °F (16 °C)
- Game attendance: 78,673
- Referee: Bernie Kukar
- TV announcers (Fox): Dick Stockton, Troy Aikman, Daryl Johnston and Pam Oliver

Game information

**First quarter**

- DAL – Tim Seder 22-yard field goal, 3:15. Cowboys 3–0. **Drive: 9 plays, 65 yards, 5:49.**
- DAL – Joey Galloway 16-yard pass from Clint Stoerner (Tim Seder kick), 0:19. Cowboys 10–0. **Drive: 2 plays, 15 yards, 0:47.**

**Second quarter**

- DAL – Dexter Coakley 29-yard interception return (Tim Seder kick), 14:32. Cowboys 17–0.
- NYG – Joe Jurevicius 4-yard pass from Kerry Collins (Morten Andersen kick), 3:22. Cowboys 17–7. **Drive: 4 plays, 63 yards, 1:49.**
- DAL – Mario Edwards 71-yard interception return (Tim Seder kick), 0:39. Cowboys 24–7.

**Third quarter**

- NYG – Joe Jurevicius 34-yard pass from Kerry Collins (Morten Andersen kick), 5:45. Cowboys 24–14. **Drive: 6 plays, 80 yards, 2:57.**

**Fourth quarter**

- NYG – Morten Andersen 40-yard field goal, 10:41. Cowboys 24–17. **Drive: 7 plays, 28 yards, 4:06.**
- NYG – Ike Hilliard 9-yard pass from Kerry Collins (Morten Andersen kick), 8:19. Tied 24–24. **Drive: 2 plays, 14 yards, 0:46.**

**Overtime**

- NYG – Morten Andersen 42-yard field goal, 7:48. Giants 27–24. **Drive: 8 plays, 61 yards, 4:17.**

**Top passers**

- DAL – Clint Stoerner – 13/23, 177 yards, TD, 4 INT
- NYG – Kerry Collins – 24/34, 280 yards, 3 TD, 2 INT

**Top rushers**

- DAL – Troy Hambrick – 30 rushes, 77 yards
- NYG – Ron Dayne – 17 rushes, 52 yards

**Top receivers**

- DAL – Raghib Ismail – 6 receptions, 107 yards
- NYG – Amani Toomer – 3 receptions, 69 yards

The Giants initially appeared to be on their way to a defeat against a Cowboys team that not only was 2–4 heading into the game but was playing without their first- and second-string quarterbacks as well as star running back Emmitt Smith. However, the Giants were able to come back from a 17-point deficit to finally end their three-game losing skid.

The Giants, who were 10.5 point favorites to win the game, played poorly in the first half. Late in the first quarter, the Giants allowed Cowboys third-string quarterback Clint Stoerner to throw a 16-yard touchdown to Joey Galloway to make it a 10–0 game. In the second quarter, Kerry Collins self-destructed. He began the quarter by throwing an interception to linebacker Dexter Coakley, who returned Collins' errant pass 29 yards for a touchdown to make it 17–0. With 3:22 to go in the half, the Giants finally got on the board with Collins throwing a 4-yard touchdown pass to Joe Jurevicius, and they had another chance to score late in the half after a Cowboys punt. However, Collins threw a second interception, this time to Mario Edwards, who returned it 71 yards for a touchdown with 39 seconds left in the half to give the Cowboys a 24–7 lead heading into the locker room.

During halftime, a special presentation honoring the Meadowlands Sports Complex's 25th anniversary was shown, highlighting some of the greatest events held at the complex. Also, some of the staff members who first worked at the complex were also honored. Coincidentally, the Giants were playing the Cowboys, who was their first opponent at Giants Stadium.

The second half was a different story. The Cowboys began to play poorly, and the Giants were able to capitalize. Clint Stoerner was particularly terrible, throwing four interceptions in a five-drive span. The first interception was by rookie cornerback Will Peterson to set up a 34-yard touchdown from Kerry Collins to Joe Jurevicius to narrow the score to 24–14, the second interception was made by Jason Sehorn, the third interception was made by Dhani Jones to set up a Morten Andersen field goal to make it a one-score game at 24–17, and Brandon Short was the recipient of Stoerner's fourth interception. Finally, in between the third and fourth interceptions, Thabiti Davis blocked and recovered a Cowboys punt to set up a Collins touchdown to Ike Hilliard to tie the game at 24–24 with 8:19 to go. However, a Ron Dayne fumble and a missed 59-yard field goal by Andersen as time expired prevented the Giants from completing the comeback in regulation, and the game went into overtime.

Cowboys coach Dave Campo benched Clint Stoerner after his fourth interception, and with the first three quarterbacks on the team out, Ryan Leaf came in for his first appearance as a Dallas Cowboy, as well as his first game after his disastrous tenure with the Chargers. His appearance in this game brought more of the same as a Micheal Barrow sack of Leaf forced a Cowboys punt on overtime's first possession. A 33-yard pass from Kerry Collins to Ike Hilliard put the Giants in Cowboys territory, and problems almost happened when Tiki Barber fumbled after catching a 10-yard pass from Collins, but he recovered his own fumble and the Giants were in field goal range. Morten Andersen this time came through on a more manageable 42-yard attempt, and the Giants completed their double-digit comeback win.

Despite the 17 point deficit, few analysts considered this game a great comeback win, and considered it more of an unimpressive win given the Cowboys' 4 second-half interceptions and the 5 Giants turnovers in the game. However, the win put the Giants back at .500.

==== Week 9: at Arizona Cardinals ====
Week 9: New York Giants at Arizona Cardinals – game summary

Quarter	1	2	3	4	Total
**Giants**	7	7	0	3	**17**
Cardinals	0	7	3	0	**10**

at Sun Devil Stadium, Tempe, Arizona

- Date: November 11
- Game time: 4:15 p.m. EST/2:15 p.m. MST
- Game weather: Scattered clouds, 80 °F (27 °C)
- Game attendance: 36,917
- Referee: Mike Carey
- TV announcers (Fox): Kenny Albert, Tim Green and D.J. Johnson

Game information

**First quarter**

- NYG – Ron Dayne 3-yard run (Morten Andersen kick), 9:31. Giants 7–0. **Drive: 7 plays, 44 yards, 3:09.**

**Second quarter**

- NYG – Ike Hilliard 27-yard pass from Kerry Collins (Morten Andersen kick), 7:40. Giants 14–0. **Drive: 5 plays, 42 yards, 2:44.**
- ARI – David Boston 38-yard pass from Jake Plummer (Bill Gramatica kick), 4:38. Giants 14–7. **Drive: 2 plays, 38 yards, 0:19.**

**Third quarter**

- ARI – Bill Gramatica 32-yard field goal, 8:05. Giants 14–10. **Drive: 9 plays, 35 yards, 4:38.**

**Fourth quarter**

- NYG – Morten Andersen 25-yard field goal, 11:39. Giants 17–10. **Drive: 10 plays, 33 yards, 5:07.**

**Top passers**

- NYG – Kerry Collins – 15/24, 155 yards, TD, INT
- ARI – Jake Plummer – 13/26, 172 yards, TD, INT

**Top rushers**

- NYG – Tiki Barber – 17 rushes, 118 yards
- ARI – Michael Pittman – 17 rushes, 54 yards

**Top receivers**

- NYG – Amani Toomer – 4 receptions, 43 yards
- ARI – David Boston – 9 receptions, 137 yards, TD

The Giants next traveled to the desert to take on the Arizona Cardinals. Held just one week after the 2001 World Series concluded, the media had a field day comparing the Giants to the Yankees and the Cardinals to the series-winning Diamondbacks. However, the Giants would assure that this contest would have a different ending.

The Giants opened the scoring with Ron Dayne running in for a 3-yard touchdown run in the first quarter. In the second quarter, the Giants extended their lead with Kerry Collins throwing a 27-yard touchdown pass to Ike Hilliard. However, the Cardinals struck back with Jake Plummer throwing a 38-yard touchdown pass to star receiver David Boston to make it a 14–7 game heading into the locker room. The Giants clinched the game with a fourth-down stop with 4:11 remaining.

Tiki Barber ran for 118 yards on 17 carries.

==== Week 10: at Minnesota Vikings ====
Week 10: New York Giants at Minnesota Vikings – game summary

Quarter	1	2	3	4	Total
Giants	10	3	3	0	**16**
**Vikings**	7	7	0	14	**28**

at Hubert H. Humphrey Metrodome, Minneapolis, Minnesota

- Date: November 19
- Game time: 9:00 p.m. EST/8:00 p.m. CST
- Game weather: None (indoor stadium)
- Game attendance: 64,283
- Referee: Bob McElwee
- TV announcers (ABC): Al Michaels, Dan Fouts, Dennis Miller, Melissa Stark and Eric Dickerson

Game information

**First quarter**

- MIN – Randy Moss 28-yard pass from Daunte Culpepper (Gary Anderson kick), 12:31. Vikings 7–0. **Drive: 4 plays, 76 yards, 2:29.**
- NYG – Morten Andersen 43-yard field goal, 6:46. Vikings 7–3. **Drive: 12 plays, 56 yards, 5:45.**
- NYG – Tiki Barber 1-yard run (Morten Andersen kick), 0:04. Giants 10–7. **Drive: 6 plays, 41 yards, 2:36.**

**Second quarter**

- MIN – Randy Moss 25-yard pass from Daunte Culpepper (Gary Anderson kick), 3:54. Vikings 14–10. **Drive: 8 plays, 74 yards, 3:59.**
- NYG – Morten Andersen 36-yard field goal, 1:05. Vikings 14–13. **Drive: 8 plays, 45 yards, 2:49.**

**Third quarter**

- NYG – Morten Andersen 51-yard field goal, 11:28. Giants 16–14. **Drive: 7 plays, 52 yards, 3:32.**

**Fourth quarter**

- MIN – Cris Carter 1-yard pass from Daunte Culpepper (Gary Anderson kick), 9:03. Vikings 21–16. **Drive: 14 plays, 62 yards, 8:54.**
- MIN – Randy Moss 57-yard pass from Daunte Culpepper (Gary Anderson kick), 6:32. Vikings 28–16. **Drive: 3 plays, 52 yards, 1:23.**

**Top passers**

- NYG – Kerry Collins – 21/37, 321 yards, 2 INT
- MIN – Daunte Culpepper – 26/38, 277 yards, 4 TD, 2 INT

**Top rushers**

- NYG – Tiki Barber – 8 rushes, 55 yards, TD
- MIN – Michael Bennett – 11 rushes, 33 yards

**Top receivers**

- NYG – Ike Hilliard – 6 receptions, 106 yards
- MIN – Randy Moss – 10 receptions, 171 yards, 3 TD

The Giants' third and final Monday Night game of the season was at Minnesota for a rematch of the 2000 NFC Championship game. However, Randy Moss would ensure that this game would have a different outcome.

The Vikings scored on just the fourth play from scrimmage, with Daunte Culpepper hitting Randy Moss for a 28-yard touchdown to make it 7–0. The Giants came back at the end of the quarter with Morten Andersen kicking a 43-yard field goal and Tiki Barber running in for a 1-yard touchdown to make the score 10–7 Giants heading into the second quarter. However, in that quarter, Randy Moss caught his second touchdown of the game from Culpepper and the Vikings regained the lead, holding a 14–13 lead heading into the intermission. Andersen kicked a 51-yard field goal to give the Giants a 16–14 lead heading into the final quarter, but a 1-yard touchdown pass from Culpepper to Cris Carter gave the Vikings a 21–16 lead with 9:03 to go. Then with 6:32 to go, Culpepper hit Moss over the middle on a crossing route, who then headed upfield and outran the Giants secondary for a 57-yard touchdown to complete the scoring.

Randy Moss caught 10 passes for 171 yards and 3 touchdowns. Cris Carter also caught 10 passes. Daunte Culpepper threw for 277 yards and 4 touchdowns, albeit with 2 interceptions.

==== Week 11: vs. Oakland Raiders ====
Week 11: Oakland Raiders at New York Giants – game summary

Quarter	1	2	3	4	Total
**Raiders**	7	14	0	7	**28**
Giants	3	0	7	0	**10**

at Giants Stadium, East Rutherford, New Jersey

- Date: November 25
- Game time: 4:15 p.m. EST
- Game weather: Overcast, 64 °F (18 °C)
- Game attendance: 78,756
- Referee: Bill Carollo
- TV announcers (CBS): Greg Gumbel, Phil Simms and Armen Keteyian

Game information

**First quarter**

- OAK – Zack Crockett 1-yard run (Sebastian Janikowski kick), 10:24. Raiders 7–0. **Drive: 8 plays, 71 yards, 4:36.**
- NYG – Morten Andersen 47-yard field goal, 3:31. Raiders 7–3. **Drive: 7 plays, 49 yards, 4:06.**

**Second quarter**

- OAK – Charlie Garner 21-yard pass from Rich Gannon (Sebastian Janikowski kick), 12:52. Raiders 14–3. **Drive: 10 plays, 63 yards, 5:39.**
- OAK – Tim Brown 46-yard pass from Rich Gannon (Sebastian Janikowski kick), 1:51. Raiders 21–3. **Drive: 6 plays, 89 yards, 3:00.**

**Third quarter**

- NYG – Tiki Barber 12-yard run (Morten Andersen kick), 4:10. Raiders 21–10. **Drive: 9 plays, 80 yards, 3:56.**

**Fourth quarter**

- OAK – Tim Brown 19-yard pass from Rich Gannon (Sebastian Janikowski kick), 9:34. Raiders 28–10. **Drive: 5 plays, 65 yards, 2:56.**

**Top passers**

- OAK – Rich Gannon – 13/20, 221 yards, 3 TD
- NYG – Kerry Collins – 19/38, 184 yards

**Top rushers**

- OAK – Charlie Garner – 14 rushes, 68 yards
- NYG – Tiki Barber – 19 rushes, 124 yards, TD

**Top receivers**

- OAK – Tim Brown – 6 receptions, 117 yards, 2 TD
- NYG – Amani Toomer – 4 receptions, 70 yards

The Giants next went home to take on the red-hot Raiders, who came into this game with a 7–2 record. In the first quarter, the Giants again allowed an opening drive touchdown, capped off by running back Zack Crockett running in for a 1-yard touchdown. The Giants' misery continued in the second quarter with Rich Gannon throwing two touchdown passes. The first was to running back Charlie Garner for a 21-yard score, then the second was to Tim Brown on a post pattern for a 46-yard touchdown to make it 21–3 Oakland heading into the locker room.

In the second half, a rainstorm ravaged Giants Stadium as both teams struggled to gain footing on the grass surface. Initially the Giants did better under the new conditions, with Tiki Barber running in for a 12-yard touchdown to make it 21–10 heading into the final quarter. However, in the fourth quarter, Rich Gannon found Tim Brown for his second receiving touchdown of the day on a 19-yard pass.

In the losing effort, Tiki Barber ran for 124 yards and a touchdown on 19 carries. But the Giants were back below .500 with a 5–6 record.

==== Week 13: at Dallas Cowboys ====
Week 13: New York Giants at Dallas Cowboys – game summary

Quarter	1	2	3	4	Total
Giants	6	7	0	0	**13**
**Cowboys**	3	3	7	7	**20**

at Texas Stadium, Irving, Texas

- Date: December 9
- Game time: 1:00 p.m. EST/12:00 p.m. CST
- Game weather: Sunny, 50 °F (10 °C)
- Game attendance: 61,821
- Referee: Ed Hochuli
- TV announcers (Fox): Sam Rosen, Bill Maas and Mike Doocy

Game information

**First quarter**

- NYG – Morten Andersen 35-yard field goal, 11:19. Giants 3–0. **Drive: 7 plays, 51 yards, 3:41.**
- DAL – Jon Hilbert 38-yard field goal, 7:45. Tied 3–3. **Drive: 4 plays, −1 yards, 1:23.**
- NYG – Morten Andersen 41-yard field goal, 2:16. Giants 6–3. **Drive: 11 plays, 47 yards, 5:29.**

**Second quarter**

- NYG – Marcellus Rivers 2-yard pass from Kerry Collins (Morten Andersen kick), 10:31. Giants 13–3. **Drive: 3 plays, 68 yards, 1:16.**
- DAL – Jon Hilbert 41-yard field goal, 0:48. Giants 13–6. **Drive: 10 plays, 62 yards, 4:51.**

**Third quarter**

- DAL – Emmitt Smith 1-yard run (Jon Hilbert kick), 6:28. Tied 13–13. **Drive: 7 plays, 72 yards, 4:10.**

**Fourth quarter**

- DAL – Jackie Harris 3-yard pass from Quincy Carter (Jon Hilbert kick), 12:50. Cowboys 20–13. **Drive: 7 plays, 26 yards, 3:55.**

**Top passers**

- NYG – Kerry Collins – 13/26, 122 yards, TD, INT
- DAL – Quincy Carter – 17/26, 194 yards, TD

**Top rushers**

- NYG – Tiki Barber – 18 rushes, 110 yards
- DAL – Emmitt Smith – 22 rushes, 62 yards

**Top receivers**

- DAL – Amani Toomer – 4 receptions, 68 yards
- DAL – Raghib Ismail – 10 receptions, 118 yards

The Giants turned out yet another poor performance after their bye week, losing to the Cowboys for the only time during the three-year span Dave Campo coached the team.

For much of the first half, the Giants were in control of the game. They led 13–6 at the half, with the key score being Kerry Collins' 2-yard touchdown pass to tight end Marcellus Rivers. However, in the second half, Emmitt Smith ran in for a 1-yard touchdown to tie the score, then rookie quarterback Quincy Carter found tight end Jackie Harris for a 3-yard touchdown in the fourth quarter.

Tiki Barber ran for 110 yards on 18 carries. However, with a 5–7 record, the Giants would now have to win out just to have a chance to make the playoffs and have a shot at defending their NFC crown.

==== Week 14: vs. Arizona Cardinals ====
Week 14: Arizona Cardinals at New York Giants – game summary

Quarter	1	2	3	4	Total
Cardinals	3	3	0	7	**13**
**Giants**	7	0	0	10	**17**

at Giants Stadium, East Rutherford, New Jersey

- Date: December 15
- Game time: 1:30 p.m. EST
- Game weather: Partly cloudy, 46 °F (8 °C)
- Game attendance: 77,913
- Referee: Dick Hantak
- TV announcers (Fox): Sam Rosen, Bill Maas and Mike Crispino

Game information

**First quarter**

- ARI – Bill Gramatica 42-yard field goal, 7:41. Cardinals 3–0. **Drive: 9 plays, 40 yards, 4:27.**
- NYG – Ron Dixon 26-yard pass from Kerry Collins (Morten Andersen kick), 5:08. Giants 7–3. **Drive: 5 plays, 70 yards, 2:33.**

**Second quarter**

- ARI – Bill Gramatica 23-yard field goal, 13:33. Giants 7–6. **Drive: 12 plays, 65 yards, 6:35.**

**Third quarter**

- No scoring plays.

**Fourth quarter**

- NYG – Morten Andersen 39-yard field goal, 11:50. Giants 10–6. **Drive: 9 plays, 37 yards, 3:15.**
- ARI – Tywan Mitchell 24-yard pass from Jake Plummer (Bill Gramatica kick), 4:04. Cardinals 13–10. **Drive: 10 plays, 43 yards, 3:00.**
- NYG – Amani Toomer 4-yard pass from Kerry Collins (Morten Andersen kick), 0:25. Giants 17–13. **Drive: 11 plays, 70 yards, 3:39.**

**Top passers**

- ARI – Jake Plummer – 27/45, 207 yards, TD
- NYG – Kerry Collins – 14/32, 147 yards, 2 TD

**Top rushers**

- ARI – Thomas Jones – 14 rushes, 37 yards
- NYG – Tiki Barber – 16 rushes, 85 yards

**Top receivers**

- ARI – David Boston – 8 receptions, 84 yards
- NYG – Tiki Barber – 5 receptions, 35 yards

The Giants' first game to avoid potential elimination from the NFC playoff race was a Saturday afternoon game at home against the Cardinals.

In the first quarter, Kerry Collins hit Ron Dixon for a 26-yard touchdown pass, and the Giants held a 7–6 lead at halftime. After a 39-yard field goal by Morten Andersen made it a 10–6 game in the fourth quarter, the Cardinals took the lead with 4:04 to go with Jake Plummer finding Tywan Mitchell for a 24-yard touchdown. The Giants then marched slowly but surely down the field on an 11-play drive featuring two third down conversions. With just 25 seconds remaining, Collins found Amani Toomer for the game-winning touchdown on a 4-yard touchdown pass. Two Hail Mary attempts by Plummer failed at the end of the game.

Regardless of the last-minute win and the importance the game had in the Giants avoiding elimination, the game will be best known for Cardinals kicker Bill Gramatica's celebration in the first quarter. After kicking a 42-yard field goal to open the scoring, Gramatica jumped in the air to celebrate (as was customary for him and his brother Martin), but upon landing, he fell awkwardly on his right leg (his planting leg as he was left-footed) and tore his ACL. What few remember is that Gramatica stayed in the game and kicked another field goal and extra point, but the injury rendered him completely ineffective for kickoffs and safety Pat Tillman (playing in his final NFL season before retiring to join the military) replaced him for the remainder of the game. After the game, Gramatica was ruled out for the remainder of the season.

==== Week 15: vs. Seattle Seahawks ====
Week 15: Seattle Seahawks at New York Giants – game summary

Quarter	1	2	3	4	Total
Seahawks	7	10	7	0	**24**
**Giants**	7	10	0	10	**27**

at Giants Stadium, East Rutherford, New Jersey

- Date: December 23
- Game time: 1:00 p.m. EST
- Game weather: Sunny, 45 °F (7 °C)
- Game attendance: 78,119
- Referee: Ron Winter
- TV announcers (CBS): Kevin Harlan, Craig James and Beasley Reece

Game information

**First quarter**

- SEA – Shaun Alexander 29-yard run (Rian Lindell kick), 5:43. Seahawks 7–0. **Drive: 10 plays, 81 yards, 5:03.**
- NYG – Ron Dayne 31-yard run (Morten Andersen kick), 2:53. Tied 7–7. **Drive: 5 plays, 76 yards, 2:50.**

**Second quarter**

- SEA – Rian Lindell 20-yard field goal, 11:31. Seahawks 10–7. **Drive: 5 plays, 51 yards, 2:08.**
- NYG – Michael Strahan 13-yard fumble return (Morten Andersen kick), 5:52. Giants 14–10.
- SEA – John Randle fumble recovery in the end zone (Rian Lindell kick), 3:24. Seahawks 17–14.
- NYG – Morten Andersen 32-yard field goal, 0:15. Tied 17–17. **Drive: 10 plays, 59 yards, 3:09.**

**Third quarter**

- SEA – Shaun Alexander 16-yard pass from Matt Hasselbeck (Rian Lindell kick), 12:53. Seahawks 24–17. **Drive: 4 plays, 30 yards, 1:53.**

**Fourth quarter**

- NYG – Morten Andersen 33-yard field goal, 12:41. Seahawks 24–20. **Drive: 12 plays, 49 yards, 4:59.**
- NYG – Ike Hilliard 7-yard pass from Kerry Collins (Morten Andersen kick), 0:20. Giants 27–24. **Drive: 10 plays, 96 yards, 2:32.**

**Top passers**

- SEA – Matt Hasselbeck – 15/26, 185 yards, TD, INT
- NYG – Kerry Collins – 30/47, 338 yards, TD

**Top rushers**

- SEA – Shaun Alexander – 28 rushes, 96 yards, TD
- NYG – Tiki Barber – 12 rushes, 47 yards

**Top receivers**

- SEA – Koren Robinson – 3 receptions, 58 yards
- NYG – Amani Toomer – 8 receptions, 124 yards

The Giants' home matchup with the Seahawks started with the two teams trading touchdowns in the first quarter. Shaun Alexander opened the scoring with a 29-yard touchdown run for the Seahawks, but Ron Dayne answered with a 31-yard touchdown to tie the score. In the second quarter, linebacker Micheal Barrow sacked Matt Hasselbeck and forced him to fumble, with Michael Strahan recovering the loose ball and returning it 13 yards for a touchdown to give the Giants their first lead of the day, 14–10. However, later in the quarter, the Seahawks also scored a defensive touchdown. Antonio Cochran sacked Kerry Collins and forced him to fumble, with defensive tackle John Randle recovering the ball in the end zone for the Seahawks to regain the lead. A Morten Andersen 32-yard field goal tied the score at 17–17 for halftime.

In the third quarter after Ron Dixon fumbled the second half kickoff being benched and replaced by safety Omar Stoutmire, Shaun Alexander scored another touchdown, this one a 16-yard pass from Matt Hasselbeck, to make the score 24–17 Seattle with 12:41 remaining, the Seahawks didn't score again. With 2:52 remaining, the Giants were at their own 4-yard line, needing to drive 96 yards for a game-winning touchdown down 24–20. Kerry Collins drove the Giants to the 7-yard line for a goal-to-go situation with 33 seconds left, when two incomplete passes brought up third down. Collins then found Ike Hilliard for the game-winning score with just 20 seconds remaining.

Amani Toomer caught 8 passes for 124 yards while Ike Hilliard caught 7 passes for 105 yards and a touchdown.

==== Week 16: at Philadelphia Eagles ====
Week 16: New York Giants at Philadelphia Eagles – game summary

Quarter	1	2	3	4	Total
Giants	0	0	10	11	**21**
**Eagles**	7	0	0	17	**24**

at Veterans Stadium, Philadelphia, Pennsylvania

- Date: December 30
- Game time: 4:05 p.m. EST
- Game weather: Scattered clouds, 30 °F (−1 °C)
- Game attendance: 65,885
- Referee: Gerry Austin
- TV announcers (Fox): Dick Stockton, Troy Aikman, Daryl Johnston and Pam Oliver

Game information

**First quarter**

- PHI – Chad Lewis 5-yard pass from Donovan McNabb (David Akers kick), 8:49. Eagles 7–0. **Drive: 9 plays, 72 yards, 4:35.**

**Second quarter**

- No scoring plays.

**Third quarter**

- NYG – Amani Toomer 60-yard pass from Kerry Collins (Morten Andersen kick), 12:34. Tied 7–7. **Drive: 1 play, 60 yards, 0:11.**
- NYG – Morten Andersen 25-yard field goal, 2:38. Giants 10–7. **Drive: 8 plays, 43 yards, 3:56.**

**Fourth quarter**

- PHI – James Thrash 57-yard pass from Donovan McNabb (David Akers kick), 14:11. Eagles 14–10. **Drive: 1 play, 57 yards, 0:08.**
- NYG – Morten Andersen 32-yard field goal, 8:44. Eagles 14–13. **Drive: 12 plays, 58 yards, 5:27.**
- NYG – Ron Dayne 16-yard run (Tiki Barber run), 2:43. Giants 21–14. **Drive: 9 plays, 81 yards, 4:51.**
- PHI – Chad Lewis 7-yard pass from Donovan McNabb (David Akers kick), 1:49. Tied 21–21. **Drive: 6 plays, 67 yards, 0:54.**
- PHI – David Akers 35-yard field goal, 0:07. Eagles 24–21. **Drive: 7 plays, 54 yards, 0:51.**

**Top passers**

- NYG – Kerry Collins – 22/39, 303 yards, TD
- PHI – Donovan McNabb – 21/39, 270 yards, 3 TD, INT

**Top rushers**

- NYG – Tiki Barber – 16 rushes, 71 yards
- PHI – Donovan McNabb – 7 rushes, 48 yards

**Top receivers**

- NYG – Tiki Barber – 10 receptions, 87 yards
- PHI – James Thrash – 7 receptions, 143 yards, TD

Now 7–7, the Giants were in an impactful game at Philadelphia. A loss for the Giants would result in the team being officially eliminated from the NFC playoff race just one season after representing the conference in the Super Bowl.

That being said, few notable events happened in the first half. The only score of the half was a 6-yard touchdown from Donovan McNabb to tight end Chad Lewis to give the Eagles a 7–0 lead. In the third quarter, the game started to pick up. The Giants ran a flea flicker, with Kerry Collins going deep and hitting Amani Toomer for a 60-yard touchdown to tie the game. A 25-yard field goal by Morten Andersen made the score 10–7 Giants heading into the final quarter.

A defensive battle all but dissipated as the two offenses erupted for 28 points in the fourth quarter. Less than a minute into the quarter, Donovan McNabb found his favorite target, James Thrash, for a 57-yard touchdown and the Eagles regained the lead, 14–10. Another Morten Andersen field goal followed to make the score 14–13. Then with 2:43 remaining, Ron Dayne broke through for a go-ahead 16-yard touchdown, and a successful two-point conversion made the score 21–14 Giants.

However, the lead would not last. Donovan McNabb drove the Eagles on a 67-yard drive after the ensuing kickoff, complete with a 32-yard pass to James Thrash. On the next play, McNabb found Chad Lewis for his second touchdown of the day, a 7-yard touchdown that tied the score 21–21 with 1:49 remaining. The Giants' next drive went nowhere, with two incomplete passes stopping the clock, and the Eagles got the ball back with 58 seconds remaining. McNabb hit Thrash for a 25-yard gain. Then, after McNabb gained a first down on a running play, Michael Strahan committed a costly error by refusing to let McNabb up after he had touched him down, resulting in a clock-stopping delay of game penalty. After one more 11-yard run by McNabb, David Akers kicked a 35-yard field goal with just 7 seconds remaining, making the score 24–21 Eagles.

With David Akers' ensuing kickoff going into the end zone for a touchback, virtually everyone watching assumed the game had finally been decided. However, the Giants had one more play, and Jim Fassel called 86 Lambuth Special - a hook and lateral play named after Ron Dixon's number and the small college in Tennessee he attended, and a play the Giants hadn't even practiced since training camp. Kerry Collins dropped back and threw to Tiki Barber on an angle pattern over the middle, who then acted as he was going right. However, Barber then abruptly lateraled the ball to Dixon, who cut to the left sideline. To the shock of nearly all watching, Dixon took off down the sideline and appeared to have a chance at a touchdown. However, upon reaching field goal range he began running out of room, and safety Damon Moore avoided problems for the Eagles by knocking Dixon out of bounds just 6 yards short of the end zone. The relieved Eagles then celebrated their NFC East title and the Giants were eliminated from playoff contention.

Kerry Collins threw for 303 yards and a touchdown, while Tiki Barber gained 156 all-purpose yards. Michael Strahan dominated Eagles tackle Jon Runyan, sacking Donovan McNabb 3.5 times. This total put him at 21.5 sacks for the year, half a sack short of former Jets defensive end Mark Gastineau's single-season record.

Although the Giants ultimately failed to win in stunning fashion on the final play, the 86 Lambuth Special play captured the imagination of the football world for the remainder of the season. The Giants would run the play again a week later, and even the Eagles would adopt the play and run it in the final play of the NFC Championship against the Rams in a last-ditch effort to score a game-winning touchdown.

==== Week 17: vs. Green Bay Packers ====
Week 17: Green Bay Packers at New York Giants – game summary

Quarter	1	2	3	4	Total
**Packers**	14	3	17	0	**34**
Giants	7	3	0	15	**25**

at Giants Stadium, East Rutherford, New Jersey

- Date: January 6
- Game time: 1:00 p.m. EST
- Game weather: Overcast, 39 °F (4 °C)
- Game attendance: 78,601
- Referee: Johnny Grier
- TV announcers (Fox): Dick Stockton, Troy Aikman, Daryl Johnston and Pam Oliver
  - Original announcers for September 16, 2001: Pat Summerall, John Madden and Ron Pitts

Game information

**First quarter**

- GB – Bill Schroeder 26-yard pass from Brett Favre (Ryan Longwell kick), 11:04. Packers 7–0. **Drive: 4 plays, 62 yards, 2:13.**
- GB – Ahman Green 25-yard run (Ryan Longwell kick), 8:33. Packers 14–0. **Drive: 3 plays, 44 yards, 1:02.**
- NYG – Ike Hilliard 8-yard pass from Kerry Collins (Morten Andersen kick), 3:43. Packers 14–7. **Drive: 8 plays, 67 yards, 4:50.**

**Second quarter**

- NYG – Morten Andersen 27-yard field goal, 11:54. Packers 14–10. **Drive: 5 plays, 66 yards, 1:15.**
- GB – Ryan Longwell 44-yard field goal, 0:00. Packers 17–10. **Drive: 6 plays, 59 yards, 1:04.**

**Third quarter**

- GB – Ahman Green 1-yard run (Ryan Longwell kick), 12:07. Packers 24–10. **Drive: 5 plays, 31 yards, 2:53.**
- GB – Ryan Longwell 43-yard field goal, 7:52. Packers 27–10. **Drive: 7 plays, 57 yards, 2:44.**
- GB – Corey Bradford 54-yard pass from Brett Favre (Ryan Longwell kick), 4:35. Packers 34–10. **Drive: 3 plays, 53 yards, 0:55.**

**Fourth quarter**

- NYG – Tiki Barber 10-yard run (Morten Andersen kick), 12:45. Packers 34–17. **Drive: 6 plays, 57 yards, 1:58.**
- NYG – Ron Dayne 1-yard run (Dayne run), 2:50. Packers 34–25. **Drive: 19 plays, 99 yards, 5:18.**

**Top passers**

- GB – Brett Favre – 15/30, 315 yards, 2 TD
- NYG – Kerry Collins – 36/59, 386 yards, TD, 2 INT

**Top rushers**

- GB – Ahman Green – 23 rushes, 101 yards, 2 TD
- NYG – Ron Dayne – 10 rushes, 81 yards, TD

**Top receivers**

- GB – Corey Bradford – 3 receptions, 111 yards, TD
- NYG – Joe Jurevicius – 8 receptions, 82 yards

With the Giants out of playoff contention heading into the final week of the season, Giants Stadium was roughly half-filled for the season finale against the Packers even though official attendance was 78,601. Just about the only factor of interest regarding the game for many was Michael Strahan's chance at achieving the single-season sack record. With 21.5 sacks, he was half a sack short of former Jet Mark Gastineau's single season record of 22 sacks, and needed a sack to break the record. Gastineau, whose record-setting season came during the Jets' first campaign at Giants Stadium in 1984, was among those in attendance for the game.

In general, however, the Giants didn't look like a playoff team for the first three quarters of this contest. The defense was particularly terrible, as they allowed Brett Favre to throw for 315 yards on just 15 completions, Ahman Green to run for 101 yards, and two receivers (Corey Bradford and Bill Schroeder) to have 100-yard days receiving. This defensive futility negated the 524 yards of total offense the Giants amassed during the contest.

In the first quarter, the Packers got on the board with Brett Favre finding Bill Schroeder for a 26-yard touchdown. On the next Packers drive, a 25-yard touchdown run by Ahman Green made it 14–0 Packers. The Giants were able to score before the end of the quarter with Kerry Collins finding Ike Hilliard for an 8-yard touchdown. At halftime, the score was 17–10 Packers.

However, the Packers dominated the third quarter. Another Ahman Green touchdown made the score 24–10. Then later in the quarter, Brett Favre went deep and found Corey Bradford for a 54-yard touchdown to make it a 34–10 game heading into the final quarter. The Giants did have moments in the fourth quarter, with Tiki Barber running in for a 10-yard touchdown, then with Ron Dayne running in for a 1-yard touchdown and two-point conversion to narrow the score to 34–25 with 2:50 remaining. But the scoring hardly mattered as the Packers had been in control from the outset of the game. The final play of the game was another execution of 86 Lambuth Special – the hook and lateral play from the previous week against the Eagles – but the play went for 29 yards rather than 74.

Throughout the game, Michael Strahan did come close to getting his record-breaking sack, but Brett Favre got the ball away each time he threatened. Finally, on the first play of the Packers' drive after the Giants' final touchdown, Strahan got his sack on a controversial play. Favre dropped back, and with Strahan closing in, simply fell to the ground and let Strahan sack him so he could break the record. In the days after the game, numerous analysts criticized the play and went as far as to state that Strahan did not deserve the record due to the intentional nature of the sack. They further noted that Strahan came in largely unblocked, leaving many to believe that the Packers had simply run a designed play so the record could be broken. Despite the criticisms however, Strahan's new mark of 22.5 was ultimately recognized as the sack record and remained as such for the next 24 years; it was tied by T.J. Watt in 2021 and finally broken by Myles Garrett in 2025.

With this loss, the Giants concluded their season at 7–9.

=== Standings ===
NFC East
	W	L	T	PCT	PF	PA	STK
^{(3)} Philadelphia Eagles	11	5	0	.688	343	208	W2
Washington Redskins	8	8	0	.500	256	303	W2
New York Giants	7	9	0	.438	294	321	L2
Arizona Cardinals	7	9	0	.438	295	343	L1
Dallas Cowboys	5	11	0	.313	246	338	L1

== See also ==
- List of New York Giants seasons
