= 2004 New York Giants season =

NFL team season

- Owner: Wellington Mara; Robert Tisch
- General manager: Ernie Accorsi
- Head coach: Tom Coughlin
- Home stadium: Giants Stadium

Results
- Record: 6–10
- Division place: 2nd NFC East
- Playoffs: Did not qualify
- Pro Bowlers: RB Tiki Barber

Uniform
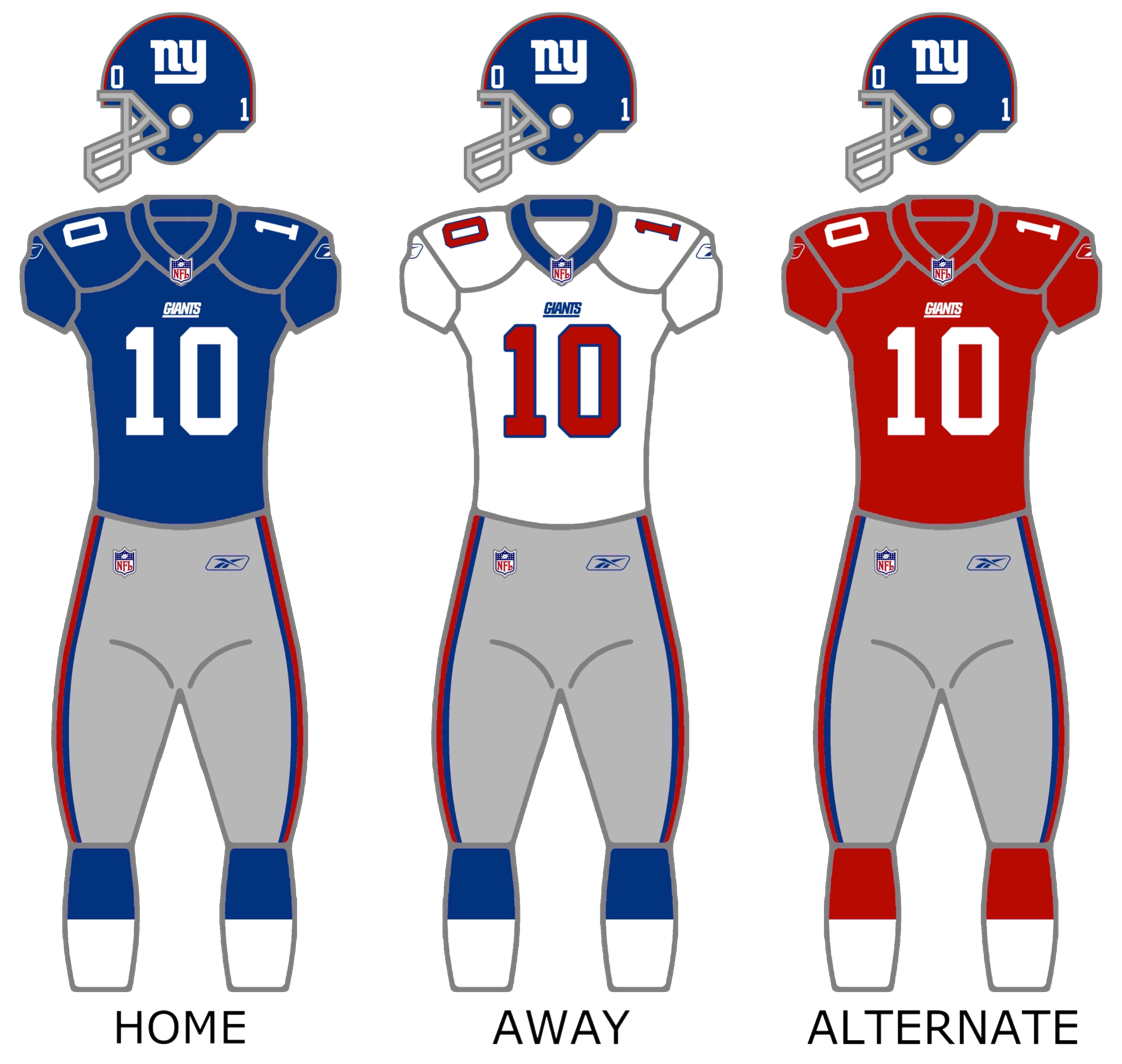

The 2004 season was the New York Giants' 80th in the National Football League (NFL) and their first under head coach Tom Coughlin. After starting the season 5–2 the Giants lost eight games in a row before winning the final game of the season to finish 6–10, good enough for second place in the NFC East by tiebreaker. This would be the Giants' last losing season until 2013.

== Offseason ==
Former Jacksonville Jaguars head coach Tom Coughlin, a Giants' wide receivers coach under Bill Parcells from 1988 to 1990, was hired to replace Jim Fassel. Who was fired following the conclusion of the 2003 season.

Additions	Subtractions
QB Kurt Warner (Rams)	QB Kerry Collins (Raiders)
RB Mike Cloud (Patriots)	RB Dorsey Levens (Eagles)
C Shaun O'Hara (Browns)	C Chris Bober (Chiefs)
G Jason Whittle (Buccaneers)	OT Ian Allen (Eagles)
DT Fred Robbins (Vikings)	DT Cornelius Griffin (Redskins)
DT Norman Hand (Seahawks)	DE Kenny Holmes (Packers)
MLB Barrett Green (Lions)	MLB Micheal Barrow (Redskins)
MLB Carlos Emmons (Eagles)	MLB Brandon Short (Panthers)
CB Terry Cousin (Panthers)	MLB Dhani Jones (Eagles)
FS Brent Alexander (Steelers)	CB Ralph Brown (Vikings)
K Steve Christie (Jaguars)	SS Ryan Clark (Redskins)
	K Matt Bryant (Colts/Dolphins)

Longtime veteran defensive tackle Keith Hamilton, the longest-tenured Giant on the roster, would also retire. His 173 games played tied Harry Carson for the sixth-most in franchise history.

=== NFL draft ===
The Giants' poor record for 2003 resulted in their being tied with the San Diego Chargers, Oakland Raiders and Arizona Cardinals for the worst record in the league. By virtue of a series of tiebreakers, the Giants landed at the fourth pick in the draft and were forecast to select Robert Gallery, an offensive tackle from Iowa, or Ben Roethlisberger, a quarterback from Miami of Ohio, with the pick. Another scenario was also listed as a possibility, and would prove to be the move the Giants would make.

Entering the draft, the consensus top pick was Ole Miss quarterback Eli Manning. However, Manning had said prior to the draft that he did not want to play for the Chargers and would not sign with them if he was drafted. The Chargers would strike a deal with the Giants before the draft that would shape the future of both franchises. The Chargers would select Manning first overall, as they had intended to. The Giants would then draft quarterback Philip Rivers of North Carolina State, and then swap him and two 2005 draft picks for Manning.

The Giants also selected former Boston College offensive guard Chris Snee, Auburn linebacker Reggie Torbor, and strong safety Gibril Wilson.

2004 New York Giants draft
Round	Pick	Player	Position	College	Notes
1	4	Philip Rivers *	QB	NC State	Traded to SD
2	34	Chris Snee	G	Boston College	
4	97	Reggie Torbor	DE	Auburn	
5	136	Gibril Wilson	S	Tennessee	
6	168	Jamaar Taylor	WR	Texas A&M	
7	203	Drew Strojny	OT	Duke	
7	253	Isaac Hilton	DE	Hampton	
Made roster † Pro Football Hall of Fame * Made at least one Pro Bowl during career

=== Undrafted free agents ===
2004 undrafted free agents of note
Player	Position	College
Jared Lorenzen	Quarterback	Kentucky
Curtis Deloatch	Cornerback	North Carolina A&T
Jim Maxwell	Linebacker	Gardner–Webb
Keylon Kincade	Running back	SMU

== Roster ==
2004 New York Giants roster
Quarterbacks (QB): 10 Eli Manning; 3 Jesse Palmer; 13 Kurt Warner; Running backs (RB): 21 Tiki Barber; 30 Mike Cloud; 27 Ron Dayne; 20 Jim Finn FB; 44 Derrick Ward; Wide receivers (WR): 88 Ike Hilliard; 89 Mark Jones; 87 Willie Ponder; 86 Jamaar Taylor; 81 Amani Toomer; 85 David Tyree; Tight ends (TE): 83 Marcellus Rivers; 82 Visanthe Shiancoe; 80 Jeremy Shockey	Offensive linemen (OL): 66 David Diehl OT; 78 Jason Hilliard OT; 62 Wayne Lucier C; 60 Shaun O'Hara C; 75 Morgan Pears T; 77 Luke Petitgout OT; 67 Chris Snee G; 65 Jason Whittle G; 76 Brandon Winey OT; Defensive linemen (DL): 97 Kenderick Allen DT; 68 Damane Duckett DT; 94 William Joseph DT; 70 Lance Legree DE; 64 Raheem Orr DE; 98 Fred Robbins DT; 72 Osi Umenyiora DE; 96 Davern Williams DT	Linebackers (LB): 51 Carlos Emmons OLB; 54 Nick Greisen OLB; 55 T. J. Hollowell OLB; 59 Kevin Lewis MLB; 57 Jim Maxwell MLB; 53 Reggie Torbor OLB; Defensive backs (DB): 27 Brent Alexander FS; 25 Will Allen CB; 31 Jack Brewer SS; 29 Curry Burns FS; 22 Terry Cousin CB; 39 Curtis DeLoatch CB; 24 Will Peterson CB; 41 Frank Walker CB; 28 Gibril Wilson SS; Special teams (ST): 2 Steve Christie K; 17 Jeff Feagles P; 90 Ryan Kuehl LS	Practice squad: 74 Ahmad Childress DT; -- Chris Davis WR; 18 Jason Geathers WR; 61 Claude Harriott DE; 15 Mike Jennings WR; -- David Miller G; -- Josh Parrish G; 34 Art Thomas CB; Reserve: 91 Lorenzo Bromell DE (IR); 84 Tim Carter WR (IR); -- Martin Chase DT (IR); -- Ed Ellis OT (IR); 52 Barrett Green OLB (IR); 95 Norman Hand DT (IR); 53 Wesly Mallard OLB (IR); 69 Rich Seubert G (PUP); 79 Barry Stokes OT (IR); 23 Omar Stoutmire FS (IR); 92 Michael Strahan DE (IR); 71 Regan Upshaw DE (IR); 73 Greg Walker OT (IR); 99 Keith Washington DE (IR); 93 Chuck Wiley DE (IR); 36 Shaun Williams S (IR); -- Antwoine Womack RB (IR); Rookies in italics 52 active, 17 reserve, 8 practice squad

== Preseason ==
Week	Date	Opponent	Result	Record	Venue	Recap
1	August 13	Kansas City Chiefs	W 34–24	1–0	Giants Stadium	Recap
2	August 19	at Carolina Panthers	L 20–27	1–1	Bank of America Stadium	Recap
3	August 27	at New York Jets	L 10–17	1–2	Giants Stadium	Recap
4	September 2	Baltimore Ravens	L 17–27	1–3	Giants Stadium	Recap

== Regular season ==
Although the Giants had traded for Eli Manning, the season began with veteran quarterback and former league MVP Kurt Warner as the starter. After a season-opening loss to the Philadelphia Eagles, Warner and the Giants enjoyed surprising success, starting a four-game winning streak that included road victories over the Dallas Cowboys and Green Bay Packers. Following a Halloween rout of the Minnesota Vikings, 34–14, the Giants were 5–2, trailing the then-undefeated Philadelphia Eagles by just two games.

The high-water mark of the Giants season came on November 7, when the Giants led the Bears 14–0 at the end of the first quarter. Over the rest of the game, though, the Giants turned the ball over five times, allowed the Bears to score 28 unanswered points (20 in the second quarter) and lost by a score of 28–21. After another loss, this time on the road against the Arizona Cardinals, Giants coach Tom Coughlin decided to replace Warner with Manning. The decision did not show immediate success, as the Giants turned the ball over ten times in the next four games, scoring a total of 37 points.

Close losses to the Pittsburgh Steelers and the Bengals followed, dropping the Giants to 5–10. The season did end with a slight possibility of succeeding, as the Giants rallied from a 16–7 fourth quarter deficit to end the season with a 28–24 victory over division rival Dallas Cowboys. Manning threw two fourth-quarter touchdown passes, and Tiki Barber scored the game winner. The Giants finished 6–10, in a three-way tie for 2nd place in the NFC East with the Cowboys and the Redskins.

=== Schedule ===
Week	Date	Opponent	Result	Record	Venue	Recap
1	September 12	at **Philadelphia Eagles**	**L** 17–31	0–1	Lincoln Financial Field	Recap
2	September 19	**Washington Redskins**	**W** 20–14	1–1	Giants Stadium	Recap
3	September 26	Cleveland Browns	**W** 27–10	2–1	Giants Stadium	Recap
4	October 3	at Green Bay Packers	**W** 14–7	3–1	Lambeau Field	Recap
5	October 10	at **Dallas Cowboys**	**W** 26–10	4–1	Texas Stadium	Recap
6	Bye					
7	October 24	Detroit Lions	**L** 13–28	4–2	Giants Stadium	Recap
8	October 31	at Minnesota Vikings	**W** 34–13	5–2	Hubert H. Humphrey Metrodome	Recap
9	November 7	Chicago Bears	**L** 21–28	5–3	Giants Stadium	Recap
10	November 14	at Arizona Cardinals	**L** 14–17	5–4	Sun Devil Stadium	Recap
11	November 21	Atlanta Falcons	**L** 10–14	5–5	Giants Stadium	Recap
12	November 28	**Philadelphia Eagles**	**L** 6–27	5–6	Giants Stadium	Recap
13	December 5	at **Washington Redskins**	**L** 7–31	5–7	FedEx Field	Recap
14	December 12	at Baltimore Ravens	**L** 14–37	5–8	M&T Bank Stadium	Recap
15	December 18	Pittsburgh Steelers	**L** 30–33	5–9	Giants Stadium	Recap
16	December 26	at Cincinnati Bengals	**L** 22–23	5–10	Paul Brown Stadium	Recap
17	January 2	**Dallas Cowboys**	**W** 28–24	6–10	Giants Stadium	Recap
Note: Intra-division opponents are in **bold** text.

=== Game summaries ===
==== Week 1: at Philadelphia Eagles ====
Week 1: New York Giants at Philadelphia Eagles – game summary

Quarter	1	2	3	4	Total
Giants	7	3	0	7	**17**
**Eagles**	14	10	7	0	**31**

at Lincoln Financial Field, Philadelphia, Pennsylvania

- Date: September 12
- Game time: 4:15 p.m. EDT
- Game weather: Partly cloudy, 78 °F (26 °C)
- Game attendance: 67,532
- Referee: Johnny Grier
- TV announcers (Fox): Dick Stockton, Daryl Johnston, and Tony Siragusa

Game information

**First quarter**

- NYG – Ron Dayne 3-yard run (Steve Christie kick), 8:17. Giants 7–0. **Drive: 7 plays, 66 yards, 3:31.**
- PHI – Terrell Owens 20-yard pass from Donovan McNabb (David Akers kick), 6:18. Tied 7–7. **Drive: 3 plays, 71 yards, 1:59.**
- PHI – Terrell Owens 3-yard pass from Donovan McNabb (David Akers kick), 2:17. Eagles 14–7. **Drive: 5 plays, 56 yards, 1:47.**

**Second quarter**

- PHI – L. J. Smith 14-yard pass from Donovan McNabb (David Akers kick), 6:15. Eagles 21–7. **Drive: 11 plays, 80 yards, 6:44.**
- PHI – David Akers 45-yard field goal, 2:14. Eagles 24–7. **Drive: 5 plays, 20 yards, 1:55.**
- NYG – Steve Christie 53-yard field goal, 1:14. Eagles 24–10. **Drive: 6 plays, 43 yards, 1:00.**

**Third quarter**

- PHI – Terrell Owens 12-yard pass from Donovan McNabb (David Akers kick), 5:22. Eagles 31–10. **Drive: 9 plays, 71 yards, 4:43.**

**Fourth quarter**

- NYG – Tiki Barber 72-yard run (Steve Christie kick), 2:25. Eagles 31–17. **Drive: 1 play, 72 yards, 0:12.**

**Top passers**

- NYG – Kurt Warner – 16/28, 203 yards
- PHI – Donovan McNabb – 26/36, 330 yards, 4 TD

**Top rushers**

- NYG – Tiki Barber – 9 rushes, 125 yards, TD
- PHI – Brian Westbrook – 17 rushes, 119 yards

**Top receivers**

- NYG – Tiki Barber – 5 receptions, 75 yards
- PHI – Terrell Owens – 8 receptions, 68 yards, 3 TD

==== Week 2: vs. Washington Redskins ====
Week 2: Washington Redskins at New York Giants – game summary

Quarter	1	2	3	4	Total
Redskins	7	0	0	7	**14**
**Giants**	0	20	0	0	**20**

at Giants Stadium, East Rutherford, New Jersey

- Date: September 19
- Game time: 1:00 p.m. EDT
- Game weather: Sunny, 62 °F (17 °C)
- Game attendance: 78,767
- Referee: Tom White
- TV announcers (Fox): Joe Buck, Cris Collinsworth, Troy Aikman and Pam Oliver

Game information

**First quarter**

- WAS – Chris Cooley 2-yard pass from Mark Brunell (John Hall kick), 7:24. Redskins 7–0. **Drive: 10 plays, 53 yards, 5:30.**

**Second quarter**

- NYG – Tim Carter 38-yard pass from Kurt Warner (Steve Christie kick), 12:53. Tied 7–7. **Drive: 1 play, 38 yards, 0:08.**
- NYG – Barrett Green 16-yard fumble return (Steve Christie kick), 6:21. Giants 14–7.
- NYG – Steve Christie 38-yard field goal, 4:34. Giants 17–7. **Drive: 4 plays, 6 yards, 1:05.**
- NYG – Steve Christie 22-yard field goal, 0:37. Giants 20–7. **Drive: 11 plays, 72 yards, 2:44.**

**Third quarter**

- No scoring plays.

**Fourth quarter**

- WAS – Clinton Portis 13-yard pass from Patrick Ramsey (John Hall kick), 12:01. Giants 20–14. **Drive: 5 plays, 49 yards, 2:14.**

**Top passers**

- WAS – Patrick Ramsey – 9/18, 142 yards, TD, 3 INT
- NYG – Kurt Warner – 22/33, 232 yards, TD

**Top rushers**

- WAS – Clinton Portis – 20 rushes, 69 yards
- NYG – Tiki Barber – 18 rushes, 42 yards

**Top receivers**

- WAS – Laveranues Coles – 9 receptions, 100 yards
- NYG – Tim Carter – 3 receptions, 63 yards, TD

==== Week 3: vs. Cleveland Browns ====
Week 3: Cleveland Browns at New York Giants – game summary

Quarter	1	2	3	4	Total
Browns	0	0	0	10	**10**
**Giants**	7	3	7	10	**27**

at Giants Stadium, East Rutherford, New Jersey

- Date: September 26
- Game time: 1:00 p.m. EDT
- Game weather: Sunny, 77 °F (25 °C)
- Game attendance: 78,521
- Referee: Bernie Kukar
- TV announcers (CBS): Jim Nantz, Phil Simms and Bonnie Bernstein

Game information

**First quarter**

- NYG – Tiki Barber 8-yard run (Steve Christie kick), 9:01. Giants 7–0. **Drive: 3 plays, 71 yards, 1:25.**

**Second quarter**

- NYG – Steve Christie 43-yard field goal, 7:51. Giants 10–0. **Drive: 7 plays, 35 yards, 3:03.**

**Third quarter**

- NYG – Kurt Warner 1-yard run (Steve Christie kick), 2:54. Giants 17–0. **Drive: 11 plays, 95 yards, 6:03.**

**Fourth quarter**

- CLE – Phil Dawson 49-yard field goal, 12:53. Giants 17–3. **Drive: 11 plays, 38 yards, 5:01.**
- NYG – Steve Christie 25-yard field goal, 6:45. Giants 20–3. **Drive: 10 plays, 66 yards, 6:08.**
- CLE – Quincy Morgan 3-yard pass from Jeff Garcia (Phil Dawson kick), 3:36. Giants 20–10. **Drive: 8 plays, 79 yards, 3:09.**
- NYG – Mike Cloud 5-yard run (Steve Christie kick), 2:02. Giants 27–10. **Drive: 5 plays, 41 yards, 1:34.**

**Top passers**

- CLE – Jeff Garcia – 21/31, 180 yards, TD, INT
- NYG – Kurt Warner – 19/27, 286 yards

**Top rushers**

- CLE – William Green – 15 rushes, 91 yards
- NYG – Tiki Barber – 23 rushes, 106 yards, TD

**Top receivers**

- CLE – Dennis Northcutt – 9 receptions, 50 yards
- NYG – Amani Toomer – 5 receptions, 126 yards

==== Week 4: at Green Bay Packers ====
Week 4: New York Giants at Green Bay Packers – game summary

Quarter	1	2	3	4	Total
**Giants**	0	0	7	7	**14**
Packers	0	0	7	0	**7**

at Lambeau Field, Green Bay, Wisconsin

- Date: October 3
- Game time: 1:00 p.m. EDT/12:00 p.m. CDT
- Game weather: Partly sunny, 61 °F (16 °C)
- Game attendance: 70,623
- Referee: Pete Morelli
- TV announcers (Fox): Joe Buck, Cris Collinsworth, Troy Aikman and Pam Oliver

Game information

**First quarter**

- No scoring plays.

**Second quarter**

- No scoring plays.

**Third quarter**

- GB – Javon Walker 28-yard pass from Brett Favre (Ryan Longwell kick), 10:03. Packers 7–0. **Drive: 9 plays, 80 yards, 4:57.**
- NYG – Tiki Barber 52-yard run (Steve Christie kick), 9:13. Tied 7–7. **Drive: 2 plays, 61 yards, 0:50.**

**Fourth quarter**

- NYG – Jeremy Shockey 4-yard pass from Kurt Warner (Steve Christie kick), 12:07. Giants 14–7. **Drive: 9 plays, 73 yards, 4:21.**

**Top passers**

- NYG – Kurt Warner – 20/26, 187 yards, TD, INT
- GB – Brett Favre – 12/18, 110 yards, TD, INT

**Top rushers**

- NYG – Tiki Barber – 23 rushes, 182 yards, TD
- GB – Ahman Green – 15 rushes, 58 yards

**Top receivers**

- NYG – Jeremy Shockey – 5 receptions, 74 yards, TD
- GB – Ahman Green – 3 receptions, 48 yards

==== Week 5: at Dallas Cowboys ====
Week 5: New York Giants at Dallas Cowboys – game summary

Quarter	1	2	3	4	Total
**Giants**	3	3	7	13	**26**
Cowboys	0	10	0	0	**10**

at Texas Stadium, Irving, Texas

- Date: October 10
- Game time: 1:00 p.m. EDT/12:00 p.m. CDT
- Game weather: Cloudy, 65 °F (18 °C)
- Game attendance: 64,018
- Referee: Bill Leavy
- TV announcers (Fox): Dick Stockton, Daryl Johnston and Tony Siragusa

Game information

**First quarter**

- NYG – Steve Christie 31-yard field goal, 5:02. Giants 3–0. **Drive: 9 plays, 39 yards, 4:05.**

**Second quarter**

- DAL – Keyshawn Johnson 7-yard pass from Vinny Testaverde (Billy Cundiff kick), 9:24. Cowboys 7–3. **Drive: 11 plays, 55 yards, 5:36.**
- DAL – Billy Cundiff 41-yard field goal, 1:56. Cowboys 10–3. **Drive: 9 plays, 58 yards, 3:08.**
- NYG – Steve Christie 51-yard field goal, 0:02. Cowboys 10–6. **Drive: 5 plays, 20 yards, 0:43.**

**Third quarter**

- NYG – Jeremy Shockey 1-yard pass from Kurt Warner (Steve Christie kick), 4:58. Giants 13–10. **Drive: 10 plays, 86 yards, 5:39.**

**Fourth quarter**

- NYG – Steve Christie 47-yard field goal, 12:02. Giants 16–10. **Drive: 7 plays, 29 yards, 3:16.**
- NYG – Steve Christie 26-yard field goal, 6:16. Giants 19–10. **Drive: 8 plays, 34 yards, 3:58.**
- NYG – Tiki Barber 3-yard run (Steve Christie kick), 2:14. Giants 26–10. **Drive: 7 plays, 70 yards, 3:15.**

**Top passers**

- NYG – Kurt Warner – 18/33, 217 yards, TD
- DAL – Vinny Testaverde – 15/24, 126 yards, TD, INT

**Top rushers**

- NYG – Tiki Barber – 23 rushes, 122 yards, TD
- DAL – Eddie George – 15 rushes, 75 yards

**Top receivers**

- NYG – Tiki Barber – 5 receptions, 76 yards
- DAL – Keyshawn Johnson – 4 receptions, 43 yards, TD

==== Week 7: vs. Detroit Lions ====
Week 7: Detroit Lions at New York Giants – game summary

Quarter	1	2	3	4	Total
**Lions**	7	0	7	14	**28**
Giants	7	3	0	3	**13**

at Giants Stadium, East Rutherford, New Jersey

- Date: October 24
- Game time: 1:00 p.m. EDT
- Game weather: Cloudy, 52 °F (11 °C)
- Game attendance: 78,841
- Referee: Walt Coleman
- TV announcers (Fox): Dick Stockton, Daryl Johnston and Tony Siragusa

Game information

**First quarter**

- DET – Roy Williams 18-yard pass from Joey Harrington (Jason Hanson kick), 9:25. Lions 7–0. **Drive: 10 plays, 70 yards, 5:35.**
- NYG – Tiki Barber 62-yard pass from Kurt Warner (Steve Christie kick), 0:16. Tied 7–7. **Drive: 5 plays, 91 yards, 2:22.**

**Second quarter**

- NYG – Steve Christie 19-yard field goal, 7:07. Giants 10–7. **Drive: 12 plays, 64 yards, 6:22.**

**Third quarter**

- DET – Kevin Jones 2-yard run (Jason Hanson kick), 9:34. Lions 14–10. **Drive: 5 plays, 68 yards, 2:51.**

**Fourth quarter**

- NYG – Steve Christie 25-yard field goal, 8:18. Lions 14–13. **Drive: 14 plays, 76 yards, 7:50.**
- DET – Reggie Swinton 2-yard pass from Joey Harrington (Jason Hanson kick), 2:52. Lions 21–13. **Drive: 9 plays, 70 yards, 5:26.**
- DET – Artose Pinner 8-yard run (Jason Hanson kick), 1:46. Lions 28–13. **Drive: 4 plays, 21 yards, 0:25.**

**Top passers**

- DET – Joey Harrington – 18/22, 230 yards, 2 TD
- NYG – Kurt Warner – 23/34, 270 yards, TD, INT

**Top rushers**

- DET – Kevin Jones – 13 rushes, 65 yards, TD
- NYG – Tiki Barber – 22 rushes, 70 yards

**Top receivers**

- DET – Roy Williams – 4 receptions, 67 yards, TD
- NYG – Tiki Barber – 7 receptions, 102 yards, TD

==== Week 8: at Minnesota Vikings ====
Week 8: New York Giants at Minnesota Vikings – game summary

Quarter	1	2	3	4	Total
**Giants**	10	10	7	7	**34**
Vikings	0	0	0	13	**13**

at Hubert H. Humphrey Metrodome, Minneapolis, Minnesota

- Date: October 31
- Game time: 1:00 p.m. EST/12:00 p.m. CST
- Game weather: None (indoor stadium)
- Game attendance: 64,012
- Referee: Larry Nemmers
- TV announcers (Fox): Dick Stockton, Cris Collinsworth, Troy Aikman and Pam Oliver

Game information

**First quarter**

- NYG – Steve Christie 50-yard field goal, 11:16. Giants 3–0. **Drive: 4 plays, −10 yards, 1:46.**
- NYG – Tiki Barber 2-yard run (Steve Christie kick), 8:15. Giants 10–0. **Drive: 4 plays, 60 yards, 2:01.**

**Second quarter**

- NYG – Tiki Barber 5-yard run (Steve Christie kick), 13:20. Giants 17–0. **Drive: 5 plays, 36 yards, 1:55.**
- NYG – Steve Christie 30-yard field goal, 0:05. Giants 20–0. **Drive: 11 plays, 49 yards, 4:01.**

**Third quarter**

- NYG – Mike Cloud 1-yard run (Steve Christie kick), 5:39. Giants 27–0. **Drive: 8 plays, 55 yards, 4:09.**

**Fourth quarter**

- NYG – Mike Cloud 2-yard run (Steve Christie kick), 12:08. Giants 34–0. **Drive: 7 plays, 51 yards, 3:42.**
- MIN – Michael Bennett 10-yard run (Morten Andersen kick), 9:01. Giants 34–7. **Drive: 8 plays, 68 yards, 3:07.**
- MIN – Nate Burleson 1-yard pass from Daunte Culpepper (pass failed), 2:44. Giants 34–13. **Drive: 7 plays, 83 yards, 2:15.**

**Top passers**

- NYG – Kurt Warner – 13/21, 144 yards
- MIN – Daunte Culpepper – 24/41, 231 yards, TD, 2 INT

**Top rushers**

- NYG – Tiki Barber – 24 rushes, 101 yards, 2 TD
- MIN – Daunte Culpepper – 5 rushes, 32 yards

**Top receivers**

- NYG – Jeremy Shockey – 3 receptions, 60 yards
- MIN – Marcus Robinson – 4 receptions, 91 yards

With the win, the Giants improved to 5-2. This, however, would be their last win until Week 17.

==== Week 9: vs. Chicago Bears ====
Week 9: Chicago Bears at New York Giants – game summary

Quarter	1	2	3	4	Total
**Bears**	0	20	0	8	**28**
Giants	14	0	0	7	**21**

at Giants Stadium, East Rutherford, New Jersey

- Date: November 7
- Game time: 4:05 p.m. EST
- Game weather: Clear, 71 °F (22 °C)
- Game attendance: 78,786
- Referee: Tom White
- TV announcers (Fox): Dick Stockton, Daryl Johnston and Tony Siragusa

Game information

**First quarter**

- NYG – Tiki Barber 3-yard run (Steve Christie kick), 8:03. Giants 7–0. **Drive: 5 plays, 38 yards, 2:37.**
- NYG – Tiki Barber 1-yard run (Steve Christie kick), 3:54. Giants 14–0. **Drive: 2 plays, 21 yards, 0:49.**

**Second quarter**

- CHI – Bernard Berrian 35-yard pass from Craig Krenzel (Paul Edinger kick), 5:13. Giants 14–7. **Drive: 2 plays, 53 yards, 0:49.**
- CHI – Anthony Thomas 4-yard run (Paul Edinger kick), 2:35. Tied 14–14. **Drive: 2 plays, 29 yards, 1:01.**
- CHI – Paul Edinger 22-yard field goal, 1:09. Bears 17–14. **Drive: 4 plays, 0 yards, 1:08.**
- CHI – Paul Edinger 21-yard field goal, 0:00. Bears 20–14. **Drive: 6 plays, 38 yards, 0:46.**

**Third quarter**

- No scoring plays.

**Fourth quarter**

- CHI – Anthony Thomas 41-yard run (Krenzel run), 7:44. Bears 28–14. **Drive: 6 plays, 76 yards, 3:51.**
- NYG – Jeremy Shockey 1-yard pass from Kurt Warner (Steve Christie kick), 1:56. Bears 28–21. **Drive: 3 plays, 11 yards, 0:27.**

**Top passers**

- CHI – Craig Krenzel – 8/21, 144 yards, TD
- NYG – Kurt Warner – 18/36, 195 yards, TD, 2 INT

**Top rushers**

- CHI – Anthony Thomas – 28 rushes, 110 yards, 2 TD
- NYG – Tiki Barber – 21 rushes, 72 yards, 2 TD

**Top receivers**

- CHI – David Terrell – 4 receptions, 70 yards
- NYG – Jeremy Shockey – 6 receptions, 64 yards, TD

==== Week 10: at Arizona Cardinals ====
Week 10: New York Giants at Arizona Cardinals – game summary

Quarter	1	2	3	4	Total
Giants	7	7	0	0	**14**
**Cardinals**	0	10	7	0	**17**

at Sun Devil Stadium, Tempe, Arizona

- Date: November 14
- Game time: 4:15 p.m. EST/2:15 p.m. MST
- Game weather: Partly cloudy, 72 °F (22 °C)
- Game attendance: 42,297
- Referee: Pete Morelli
- TV announcers (Fox): Kenny Albert, Brian Baldinger and Kevin McCabe

Game information

**First quarter**

- NYG – Jeremy Shockey 2-yard pass from Kurt Warner (Steve Christie kick), 3:38. Giants 7–0. **Drive: 11 plays, 80 yards, 6:35.**

**Second quarter**

- ARI – Neil Rackers 41-yard field goal, 13:36. Giants 7–3. **Drive: 11 plays, 51 yards, 5:02.**
- NYG – Tiki Barber 2-yard run (Steve Christie kick), 9:03. Giants 14–3. **Drive: 10 plays, 80 yards, 4:33.**
- ARI – Emmitt Smith 2-yard run (Neil Rackers kick), 0:39. Giants 14–10. **Drive: 9 plays, 68 yards, 2:39.**

**Third quarter**

- ARI – Emmitt Smith 3-yard run (Neil Rackers kick), 1:09. Cardinals 17–14. **Drive: 7 plays, 37 yards, 4:11.**

**Fourth quarter**

- No scoring plays.

**Top passers**

- NYG – Kurt Warner – 19/30, 193 yards, TD
- ARI – Josh McCown – 12/24, 90 yards

**Top rushers**

- NYG – Tiki Barber – 21 rushes, 108 yards, TD
- ARI – Emmitt Smith – 19 rushes, 67 yards, 2 TD

**Top receivers**

- NYG – Amani Toomer – 8 receptions, 100 yards
- ARI – Bryant Johnson – 3 receptions, 33 yards

==== Week 11: vs. Atlanta Falcons ====
Week 11: Atlanta Falcons at New York Giants – game summary

Quarter	1	2	3	4	Total
**Falcons**	7	7	0	0	**14**
Giants	0	0	7	3	**10**

at Giants Stadium, East Rutherford, New Jersey

- Date: November 21
- Game time: 4:15 p.m. EST
- Game weather: Cloudy, 57 °F (14 °C)
- Game attendance: 78,793
- Referee: Jeff Triplette
- TV announcers (Fox): Joe Buck, Cris Collinsworth, Troy Aikman and Pam Oliver

Game information

**First quarter**

- ATL – Alge Crumpler 6-yard pass from Michael Vick (Jay Feely kick), 7:02. Falcons 7–0. **Drive: 11 plays, 84 yards, 5:57.**

**Second quarter**

- ATL – Alge Crumpler 2-yard pass from Michael Vick (Jay Feely kick), 9:09. Falcons 14–0. **Drive: 12 plays, 74 yards, 7:46.**

**Third quarter**

- NYG – Jeremy Shockey 6-yard pass from Eli Manning (Steve Christie kick), 4:37. Falcons 14–7. **Drive: 16 plays, 72 yards, 7:53.**

**Fourth quarter**

- NYG – Steve Christie 24-yard field goal, 6:28. Falcons 14–10. **Drive: 13 plays, 65 yards, 6:13.**

**Top passers**

- ATL – Michael Vick – 12/20, 115 yards, 2 TD
- NYG – Eli Manning – 17/37, 162 yards, TD, 2 INT

**Top rushers**

- ATL – Michael Vick – 15 rushes, 104 yards
- NYG – Tiki Barber – 21 rushes, 107 yards

**Top receivers**

- ATL – Alge Crumpler – 4 receptions, 47 yards, 2 TD
- NYG – Jeremy Shockey – 5 receptions, 45 yards, TD

==== Week 12: vs. Philadelphia Eagles ====
Week 12: Philadelphia Eagles at New York Giants – game summary

Quarter	1	2	3	4	Total
**Eagles**	0	7	13	7	**27**
Giants	3	3	0	0	**6**

at Giants Stadium, East Rutherford, New Jersey

- Date: November 28
- Game time: 1:00 p.m. EST
- Game weather: Partly sunny, 61 °F (16 °C)
- Game attendance: 78,830
- Referee: Terry McAulay
- TV announcers (Fox): Joe Buck, Cris Collinsworth, Troy Aikman and Pam Oliver

Game information

**First quarter**

- NYG – Steve Christie 22-yard field goal, 3:26. Giants 3–0. **Drive: 12 plays, 87 yards, 6:42.**

**Second quarter**

- PHI – Donovan McNabb 4-yard run (David Akers kick), 14:53. Eagles 7–3. **Drive: 7 plays, 53 yards, 3:33.**
- NYG – Steve Christie 31-yard field goal, 9:08. Eagles 7–6. **Drive: 5 plays, 32 yards, 2:18.**

**Third quarter**

- PHI – David Akers 47-yard field goal, 11:26. Eagles 10–6. **Drive: 10 plays, 53 yards, 3:34.**
- PHI – David Akers 42-yard field goal, 8:58. Eagles 13–6. **Drive: 5 plays, 23 yards, 1:40.**
- PHI – Brian Westbrook 1-yard run (David Akers kick), 1:41. Eagles 20–6. **Drive: 7 plays, 28 yards, 4:10.**

**Fourth quarter**

- PHI – Brian Westbrook 34-yard pass from Donovan McNabb (David Akers kick), 9:52. Eagles 27–6. **Drive: 9 plays, 82 yards, 5:43.**

**Top passers**

- PHI – Donovan McNabb – 18/27, 244 yards, TD
- NYG – Eli Manning – 6/21, 148 yards, 2 INT

**Top rushers**

- PHI – Brian Westbrook – 18 rushes, 74 yards, TD
- NYG – Tiki Barber – 19 rushes, 110 yards

**Top receivers**

- PHI – Todd Pinkston – 3 receptions, 75 yards
- NYG – Jamaar Taylor – 2 receptions, 102 yards

==== Week 13: at Washington Redskins ====
Week 13: New York Giants at Washington Redskins – game summary

Quarter	1	2	3	4	Total
Giants	0	0	7	0	**7**
**Redskins**	7	14	3	7	**31**

at FedEx Field, Landover, Maryland

- Date: December 5
- Game time: 4:15 p.m. EST
- Game weather: Clear, 61 °F (16 °C)
- Game attendance: 87,872
- Referee: Walt Coleman
- TV announcers (Fox): Sam Rosen, Bill Maas and Chris Myers

Game information

**First quarter**

- WAS – Clinton Portis 1-yard run (John Hall kick), 5:47. Redskins 7–0. **Drive: 13 plays, 93 yards, 7:15.**

**Second quarter**

- WAS – Clinton Portis 4-yard pass from Patrick Ramsey (John Hall kick), 4:44. Redskins 14–0. **Drive: 10 plays, 91 yards, 6:08.**
- WAS – Robert Royal 9-yard pass from Patrick Ramsey (John Hall kick), 0:41. Redskins 21–0. **Drive: 5 plays, 31 yards, 2:21.**

**Third quarter**

- WAS – John Hall 46-yard field goal, 5:38. Redskins 24–0. **Drive: 8 plays, 33 yards, 3:42.**
- NYG – Derrick Ward 92-yard kickoff return (Steve Christie kick), 5:25. Redskins 24–7.

**Fourth quarter**

- WAS – Chris Cooley 6-yard pass from Patrick Ramsey (John Hall kick), 11:42. Redskins 31–7. **Drive: 14 plays, 72 yards, 8:43.**

**Top passers**

- NYG – Eli Manning – 12/25, 113 yards
- WAS – Patrick Ramsey – 19/22, 174 yards, 3 TD

**Top rushers**

- NYG – Tiki Barber – 15 rushes, 38 yards
- WAS – Clinton Portis – 31 rushes, 148 yards, TD

**Top receivers**

- NYG – Amani Toomer – 2 receptions, 59 yards
- WAS – Laveranues Coles – 6 receptions, 60 yards

==== Week 14: at Baltimore Ravens ====
Week 14: New York Giants at Baltimore Ravens – game summary

Quarter	1	2	3	4	Total
Giants	0	7	0	7	**14**
**Ravens**	10	17	10	0	**37**

at M&T Bank Stadium, Baltimore, Maryland

- Date: December 12
- Game time: 1:00 p.m. EST
- Game weather: Partly cloudy, 48 °F (9 °C)
- Game attendance: 69,856
- Referee: Bill Carollo
- TV announcers (Fox): Kenny Albert, Brian Baldinger and Jay Glazer

Game information

**First quarter**

- BAL – Clarence Moore 12-yard pass from Kyle Boller (Matt Stover kick), 12:04. Ravens 7–0. **Drive: 6 plays, 27 yards, 2:50.**
- BAL – Matt Stover 46-yard field goal, 9:01. Ravens 10–0. **Drive: 4 plays, 0 yards, 1:50.**

**Second quarter**

- BAL – Todd Heap 6-yard pass from Kyle Boller (Matt Stover kick), 7:05. Ravens 17–0. **Drive: 9 plays, 87 yards, 5:10.**
- NYG – Osi Umenyiora 50-yard fumble return (Steve Christie kick), 2:43. Ravens 17–7.
- BAL – Clarence Moore 8-yard pass from Kyle Boller (Matt Stover kick), 0:21. Ravens 24–7. **Drive: 9 plays, 73 yards, 2:22.**
- BAL – Matt Stover 44-yard field goal, 0:00. Ravens 27–7. **Drive: 1 play, 0 yards, 0:03.**

**Third quarter**

- BAL – Matt Stover 47-yard field goal, 7:50. Ravens 30–7. **Drive: 7 plays, 27 yards, 2:44.**
- BAL – Todd Heap 1-yard pass from Kyle Boller (Matt Stover kick), 1:42. Ravens 37–7. **Drive: 4 plays, 14 yards, 2:07.**

**Fourth quarter**

- NYG – Tiki Barber 1-yard run (Steve Christie kick), 3:49. Ravens 37–14. **Drive: 6 plays, 78 yards, 2:18.**

**Top passers**

- NYG – Kurt Warner – 6/9, 127 yards
- BAL – Kyle Boller – 18/34, 219 yards, 4 TD

**Top rushers**

- NYG – Tiki Barber – 19 rushes, 55 yards, TD
- BAL – Chester Taylor – 25 rushes, 104 yards

**Top receivers**

- NYG – Jeremy Shockey – 5 receptions, 83 yards
- BAL – Todd Heap – 5 receptions, 76 yards, 2 TD

==== Week 15: vs. Pittsburgh Steelers ====
Week 15: Pittsburgh Steelers at New York Giants – game summary

Quarter	1	2	3	4	Total
**Steelers**	10	10	3	10	**33**
Giants	14	0	10	6	**30**

at Giants Stadium, East Rutherford, New Jersey

- Date: December 18
- Game time: 1:30 p.m. EST
- Game weather: Mostly sunny, 42 °F (6 °C)
- Game attendance: 78,836
- Referee: Gerry Austin
- TV announcers (CBS): Jim Nantz, Phil Simms and Bonnie Bernstein

Game information

**First quarter**

- NYG – Willie Ponder 91-yard kickoff return (Steve Christie kick), 14:45. Giants 7–0.
- PIT – Verron Haynes 10-yard pass from Antwaan Randle El (Jeff Reed kick), 7:26. Tied 7–7. **Drive: 6 plays, 55 yards, 2:54.**
- NYG – Jeremy Shockey 2-yard pass from Eli Manning (Steve Christie kick), 4:02. Giants 14–7. **Drive: 6 plays, 55 yards, 3:24.**
- PIT – Jeff Reed 33-yard field goal, 0:19. Giants 14–10. **Drive: 7 plays, 49 yards, 3:43.**

**Second quarter**

- PIT – Antwaan Randle El 35-yard pass from Ben Roethlisberger (Jeff Reed kick), 5:36. Steelers 17–14. **Drive: 12 plays, 88 yards, 6:09.**
- PIT – Jeff Reed 21-yard field goal, 0:14. Steelers 20–14. **Drive: 9 plays, 74 yards, 3:35.**

**Third quarter**

- NYG – Steve Christie 22-yard field goal, 8:35. Steelers 20–17. **Drive: 9 plays, 33 yards, 4:52.**
- PIT – Jeff Reed 36-yard field goal, 4:15. Steelers 23–17. **Drive: 10 plays, 51 yards, 4:20.**
- NYG – Marcellus Rivers 1-yard pass from Eli Manning (Steve Christie kick), 0:29. Giants 24–23. **Drive: 5 plays, 72 yards, 3:46.**

**Fourth quarter**

- PIT – Jeff Reed 28-yard field goal, 11:35. Steelers 26–24. **Drive: 8 plays, 60 yards, 3:54.**
- NYG – Tiki Barber 1-yard run (pass failed), 8:15. Giants 30–26. **Drive: 7 plays, 52 yards, 3:20.**
- PIT – Jerome Bettis 1-yard run (Jeff Reed kick), 4:57. Steelers 33–30. **Drive: 7 plays, 67 yards, 3:18.**

**Top passers**

- PIT – Ben Roethlisberger – 18/28, 316 yards, TD, 2 INT
- NYG – Eli Manning – 16/23, 182 yards, 2 TD, INT

**Top rushers**

- PIT – Jerome Bettis – 36 rushes, 140 yards, TD
- NYG – Tiki Barber – 18 rushes, 76 yards, TD

**Top receivers**

- PIT – Antwaan Randle El – 5 receptions, 149 yards, TD
- NYG – David Tyree – 1 reception, 49 yards

With their 7th consecutive loss, the Giants were eliminated from playoff contention at 5-9.

==== Week 16: at Cincinnati Bengals ====
Week 16: New York Giants at Cincinnati Bengals – game summary

Quarter	1	2	3	4	Total
Giants	0	13	3	6	**22**
**Bengals**	7	3	7	6	**23**

at Paul Brown Stadium, Cincinnati, Ohio

- Date: December 26
- Game time: 1:00 p.m. EST
- Game weather: Cloudy, 24 °F (−4 °C)
- Game attendance: 64,606
- Referee: Scott Green
- TV announcers (Fox): Sam Rosen, Bill Maas and Chris Myers

Game information

**First quarter**

- CIN – Chad Johnson 5-yard pass from Jon Kitna (Shayne Graham kick), 5:26. Bengals 7–0. **Drive: 7 plays, 46 yards, 3:28.**

**Second quarter**

- NYG – Tiki Barber 1-yard run (Steve Christie kick), 12:49. Tied 7–7. **Drive: 11 plays, 57 yards, 4:51.**
- CIN – Shayne Graham 42-yard field goal, 9:46. Bengals 10–7. **Drive: 7 plays, 31 yards, 3:03.**
- NYG – Steve Christie 31-yard field goal, 5:22. Tied 10–10. **Drive: 9 plays, 54 yards, 4:24.**
- NYG – Steve Christie 36-yard field goal, 0:00. Giants 13–10. **Drive: 11 plays, 49 yards, 3:13.**

**Third quarter**

- NYG – Steve Christie 44-yard field goal, 7:36. Giants 16–10. **Drive: 8 plays, 34 yards, 3:45.**
- CIN – Rudi Johnson 1-yard run (Shayne Graham kick), 1:21. Bengals 17–16. **Drive: 10 plays, 58 yards, 6:15.**

**Fourth quarter**

- NYG – Steve Christie 41-yard field goal, 12:38. Giants 19–17. **Drive: 8 plays, 39 yards, 3:43.**
- NYG – Steve Christie 28-yard field goal, 5:15. Giants 22–17. **Drive: 6 plays, 18 yards, 3:05.**
- CIN – Chad Johnson 4-yard pass from Jon Kitna (pass failed), 0:44. Bengals 23–22. **Drive: 6 plays, 24 yards, 1:21.**

**Top passers**

- NYG – Eli Manning – 19/37, 201 yards, INT
- CIN – Jon Kitna – 20/32, 186 yards, 2 TD, INT

**Top rushers**

- NYG – Tiki Barber – 22 rushes, 109 yards, TD
- CIN – Rudi Johnson – 19 rushes, 31 yards, TD

**Top receivers**

- NYG – Jeremy Shockey – 6 receptions, 64 yards
- CIN – T. J. Houshmandzadeh – 5 receptions, 64 yards

==== Week 17: vs. Dallas Cowboys ====
Week 17: Dallas Cowboys at New York Giants – game summary

Quarter	1	2	3	4	Total
Cowboys	3	6	7	8	**24**
**Giants**	0	7	0	21	**28**

at Giants Stadium, East Rutherford, New Jersey

- Date: January 2
- Game time: 8:30 p.m. EST
- Game weather: Cloudy, 47 °F (8 °C)
- Game attendance: 78,500
- Referee: Jeff Triplette
- TV announcers (ESPN): Mike Patrick, Paul Maguire, Joe Theismann and Suzy Kolber

Game information

**First quarter**

- DAL – Billy Cundiff 40-yard field goal, 4:15. Cowboys 3–0. **Drive: 6 plays, 19 yards, 2:08.**

**Second quarter**

- NYG – Visanthe Shiancoe 2-yard pass from Eli Manning (Steve Christie kick), 12:48. Giants 7–3. **Drive: 14 plays, 77 yards, 6:27.**
- DAL – Billy Cundiff 24-yard field goal, 1:54. Giants 7–6. **Drive: 10 plays, 57 yards, 5:31.**
- DAL – Billy Cundiff 45-yard field goal, 0:00. Cowboys 9–7. **Drive: 8 plays, 44 yards, 1:07.**

**Third quarter**

- DAL – Jason Witten 7-yard pass from Vinny Testaverde (Billy Cundiff kick), 0:45. Cowboys 16–7. **Drive: 15 plays, 71 yards, 9:39.**

**Fourth quarter**

- NYG – David Tyree 15-yard pass from Eli Manning (Steve Christie kick), 14:55. Cowboys 16–14. **Drive: 2 plays, 62 yards, 0:50.**
- NYG – Tiki Barber 3-yard pass from Eli Manning (Steve Christie kick), 11:51. Giants 21–16. **Drive: 6 plays, 20 yards, 2:50.**
- DAL – Julius Jones 1-yard run (Testaverde-Witten pass), 1:49. Cowboys 24–21. **Drive: 12 plays, 80 yards, 6:40.**
- NYG – Tiki Barber 3-yard run (Steve Christie kick), 0:11. Giants 7–7. **Drive: 6 plays, 66 yards, 1:38.**

**Top passers**

- DAL – Vinny Testaverde – 23/30, 231 yards, TD
- NYG – Eli Manning – 18/27, 144 yards, 3 TD, INT

**Top rushers**

- DAL – Julius Jones – 29 rushes, 149 yards, TD
- NYG – Tiki Barber – 24 rushes, 95 yards, TD

**Top receivers**

- DAL – Jason Witten – 8 receptions, 77 yards, TD
- NYG – David Tyree – 7 receptions, 71 yards, TD

With the win, the Giants snap their 8 game losing streak to finish the season at 6-10 and 3-3 against the NFC East.

== Standings ==
NFC East
	W	L	T	PCT	DIV	CONF	PF	PA	STK
^{(1)} Philadelphia Eagles	13	3	0	.813	6–0	11–1	386	260	L2
New York Giants	6	10	0	.375	3–3	5–7	303	347	W1
Dallas Cowboys	6	10	0	.375	2–4	5–7	293	405	L1
Washington Redskins	6	10	0	.375	1–5	6–6	240	265	W1

NFC
#	Team	Division	W	L	T	PCT	DIV	CONF	SOS	SOV	STK
Division leaders
1	Philadelphia Eagles	East	13	3	0	.813	6–0	11–1	.453	.409	L2
2	Atlanta Falcons	South	11	5	0	.688	4–2	8–4	.420	.432	L2
3	Green Bay Packers	North	10	6	0	.625	5–1	9–3	.457	.419	W2
4	Seattle Seahawks	West	9	7	0	.563	3–3	8–4	.445	.368	W2
Wild cards
5 (Note: St. Louis clinched the NFC #5 seed instead of Minnesota or New Orleans based on better conference record (7–5 to Minnesota’s 5–7 to New Orleans’ 6–6).)	St. Louis Rams	West	8	8	0	.500	5–1	7–5	.488	.438	W2
6 (Note: Minnesota clinched the NFC #6 seed instead of New Orleans based on head-to-head victory.)	Minnesota Vikings	North	8	8	0	.500	3–3	5–7	.480	.406	L2
Did not qualify for the postseason
7	New Orleans Saints	South	8	8	0	.500	3–3	6–6	.465	.427	W4
8	Carolina Panthers	South	7	9	0	.438	3–3	6–6	.496	.366	L1
9 (Note: Detroit finished ahead of Arizona and New York Giants based upon head-to-head record (2–0 versus Arizona’s 1–1 and New York Giants’ 0–2). Division tiebreak was initially used to eliminate Dallas and Washington.)	Detroit Lions	North	6	10	0	.375	2–4	5–7	.496	.417	L2
10	Arizona Cardinals	West	6	10	0	.375	2–4	5–7	.461	.417	W1
11 (Note: New York Giants finished ahead of Dallas and Washington in the NFC East based on better head-to-head record (3–1 to Dallas‘ 2–2 to Washington’s 1–3).)	New York Giants	East	6	10	0	.375	3–3	5–7	.516	.417	W1
12 (Note: Dallas finished ahead of Washington in the NFC East based on head-to-head sweep.)	Dallas Cowboys	East	6	10	0	.375	2–4	5–7	.516	.375	L1
13	Washington Redskins	East	6	10	0	.375	1–5	6–6	.477	.333	W1
14 (Note: Tampa Bay finished ahead of Chicago based upon head-to-head victory.)	Tampa Bay Buccaneers	South	5	11	0	.313	2–4	4–8	.477	.413	L4
15	Chicago Bears	North	5	11	0	.313	2–4	4–8	.465	.388	L4
16	San Francisco 49ers	West	2	14	0	.125	2–4	2–10	.488	.375	L3
Tiebreakers (Note: When breaking ties for three or more teams under the NFL's rules, they are first broken within divisions, then comparing only the highest-ranked remaining team from each division.)

== See also ==
- List of New York Giants seasons
