= Kevin Lewis (linebacker) =

American football player (born 1978)

No. 59
- Position: Linebacker

Personal information
- Born: October 6, 1978 (age 48); Orlando, Florida, U.S.
- Listed height: 6 ft 1 in (1.85 m)
- Listed weight: 235 lb (107 kg)

Career information
- High school: Jones (Orlando)
- College: Duke
- NFL draft: 2000: undrafted

Career history
- New York Giants (2000–2005)

Career NFL statistics
- Tackles: 161
- Sacks: 2
- Passes defended: 3
- Stats at Pro Football Reference

Kevin Lewis (born October 6, 1978) is an American former professional football player who was a linebacker in the National Football League (NFL) who played for the New York Giants. He played college football for the Duke Blue Devils.

== College career ==
At Duke University, Lewis burst on the college scene against the #1 team in the country at the time, Florida State University, logging 8 tackles, a sack and an interception at the age of 17.

== Professional career ==
Lewis originally signed with the Giants on April 24, 2000, as an undrafted free agent after the 2000 NFL draft. After being inactive for the first games of 2000, Lewis was waived to make room for placekicker Jaret Holmes. He was re-signed when Ralph Brown was placed on injured reserve. Overall, he played in seven games without recording a stat. He was released as a final cut on September 3, 2001. The Giants re-signed Lewis to the practice squad a day later. On November 4, he was signed to the active roster. Despite spending the first half of the year on the practice squad, Lewis played in nine games, recording 12 tackles.

After making the team out of training camp, Lewis recovered a fumbled snap against the Arizona Cardinals on September 30, 2002. Due to multiple injuries suffered by Giants players, Lewis got more playing time than was expected for him. Against the Washington Redskins on November 17, after Lewis tackled running back Ladell Betts he fumbled the ball, which was recovered by Giants player Marcellus Rivers. Lewis along with fellow linebacker, Nick Greisen got his first career start at linebacker against the Redskins on December 8. In the game, Lewis recorded six tackles and his first career sack. For the season, Lewis registered 12 tackles and a sack.

Lewis followed up his 2002 performance by playing in all 16 games in 2003 and recording 16 tackles. When Mike Barrow was injured in the first game of the 2004 season, Lewis was named the starter over Nick Greisen. On October 31 against the Minnesota Vikings, he recovered a fumble by Mewelde Moore for 16 yards. At the end of the year, Lewis ended up leading the Giants with 91 tackles. He was released as a final cut on September 3, 2005. Lewis sat out every game in 2005 without being signed, but after Antonio Pierce and Chase Blackburn became injured, Lewis re-signed before the first playoff game against the Carolina Panthers.

== NFL career statistics ==
Legend
**Bold**	Career high

=== Regular season ===
Year	Team	Games		Tackles					Interceptions					Fumbles			
Year	Team	GP	GS	Cmb	Solo	Ast	Sck	TFL	Int	Yds	TD	Lng	PD	FF	FR	Yds	TD
2000	NYG	7	0	4	3	1	0.0	0	0	0	0	0	0	0	0	0	0
2001	NYG	9	0	12	9	3	0.0	0	0	0	0	0	0	0	0	0	0
2002	NYG	15	2	30	24	6	**1.0**	2	0	0	0	0	0	**1**	**2**	-1	0
2003	NYG	**16**	0	20	13	7	0.0	0	0	0	0	0	0	0	0	0	0
2004	NYG	**16**	**16**	**91**	**65**	**26**	**1.0**	**4**	0	0	0	0	**3**	0	1	**16**	0
2005	NYG	1	1	4	4	0	0.0	0	0	0	0	0	0	0	0	0	0
		64	19	161	118	43	2.0	6	0	0	0	0	3	1	3	15	0

=== Playoffs ===
Year	Team	Games		Tackles					Interceptions					Fumbles			
Year	Team	GP	GS	Cmb	Solo	Ast	Sck	TFL	Int	Yds	TD	Lng	PD	FF	FR	Yds	TD
2002	NYG	**1**	0	2	2	0	0.0	0	0	0	0	0	0	0	0	0	0
2005	NYG	**1**	**1**	**10**	**6**	**4**	0.0	**2**	0	0	0	0	0	0	0	0	0
		2	1	12	8	4	0.0	2	0	0	0	0	0	0	0	0	0
