= 2001 Washington Redskins season =

NFL team season

- Owner: Daniel Snyder
- General manager: Marty Schottenheimer (de facto)
- Head coach: Marty Schottenheimer
- Offensive coordinator: Jimmy Raye II
- Defensive coordinator: Kurt Schottenheimer
- Home stadium: FedExField

Results
- Record: 8–8
- Division place: 2nd NFC East
- Playoffs: Did not qualify

The 2001 season was the Washington Redskins' 70th in the National Football League (NFL), their 65th representing Washington, D.C., and the only season under head coach Marty Schottenheimer. Despite an ugly start to the season at 0–5, the Redskins began a 5-game winning streak, and by week 14 were 6–6 and in the midst in the NFC playoff hunt. However, despite outplaying their next two opponents, the Redskins dropped two critical games to the Philadelphia Eagles and Chicago Bears, eliminating them from playoff contention, though they would finish the season on a high note at 8–8.

== Offseason ==
Additions	Subtractions
P Bryan Barker (Jaguars)	QB Brad Johnson (Buccaneers)
G Matt Campbell (Panthers)	WR Albert Connell (Saints)
G Ben Coleman (Chargers)	T Ed Ellis (Chargers)
FS Keith Lyle (Rams)	LB Greg Jones (Bears)
WR Kevin Lockett (Chiefs)	DE N. D. Kalu (Eagles)
G Dave Szott (Chiefs)	RB Adrian Murrell (Panthers)
FB Donnell Bennett (Chiefs)	FB Mike Sellers (Browns)
WR Eric Metcalf (Raiders)	LB Derek M. Smith (49ers)
	WR James Thrash (Eagles)

=== NFL draft ===
2001 Washington Redskins draft
Round	Pick	Player	Position	College	Notes
1	15	Rod Gardner	Wide receiver	Clemson	
2	45	Fred Smoot	Cornerback	Mississippi State	
4	109	Sage Rosenfels	Quarterback	Iowa State	
5	154	Darnerien McCants	Wide receiver	Delaware State	
6	186	Mario Monds	Defensive tackle	Cincinnati	
Made roster

=== Undrafted free agents ===
2001 undrafted free agents of note
Player	Position	College
Cornelius Anthony	Linebacker	Texas A&M
David Brandt	Center	Michigan
Terry Bryant	Defensive end	Clemson
Mike Cerimele	Fullback	Penn State
Jauron Dailey	Linebacker	Florida A&M
Jamaal Dinkins	Fullbacker	Mississippi State
Dan Frantz	Punter	Portland State
Latef Grim	Wide receiver	Pittsburgh
Brad Harms	Guard	Northern Iowa
Tam Hopkins	Guard	Ohio State
Rod Kelly	Defensive end	Northeastern State
Trey Langley	Tackle	LSU
Ivan Mercer	Tight end	Miami (FL)
Chaz Murphy	Linebacker	Kansas
Ifeanyi Ohalete	Safety	USC
Antonio Pierce	Linebacker	Arizona
Jason Schwab	Tackle	Nebraska
Anthony Sessions	Linebacker	Tennessee
John Sigmund	Tight end	Wisconsin
Justin Skaggs	Wide receiver	Evangel
Stanley Stephens	Running back	South Carolina State
Ross Tucker	Guard	Princeton
Greg Walls	Cornerback	TCU
Mike Watkins	Quarterback	Louisville
Kenny Watson	Running back	Penn State

== Personnel ==
=== Staff ===
2001 Washington Redskins staff
Front office: Owner – Daniel Snyder; Vice president of player personnel – John Schneider; Vice president of football operations – Pepper Rodgers; Assistant general manager – Bobby Mitchell; Head coaches: Head coach/director of football operations – Marty Schottenheimer; Offensive coaches: Offensive coordinator – Jimmy Raye II; Quarterbacks – Brian Schottenheimer; Running backs – Hue Jackson; Wide receivers – Richard Mann; Tight ends – Tony Sparano; Offensive line – Joe Pendry; Offensive assistant/quality control – Pete Carmichael Jr.	Defensive coaches: Defensive coordinator – Kurt Schottenheimer; Defensive line – Mike Trgovac; Linebackers – Greg Manusky; Defensive backs – Jerry Holmes; Defensive assistant – Bill Arnsparger; Defensive assistant/quality control – Kirk Olivadotti; Special teams coaches: Special teams – Mike Stock; Strength and conditioning: Strength and conditioning – Dave Redding; Assistant strength and conditioning – Matt Schiotz

=== Roster ===
2001 Washington Redskins roster
Quarterbacks (QB): 12 Tony Banks; 10 Kent Graham; 18 Sage Rosenfels; Running backs (RB): 20 Michael Bates; 32 Donnell Bennett; 23 Ki-Jana Carter; 48 Stephen Davis; 47 Bryan Johnson; Wide receivers (WR): 87 Rod Gardner; 83 Kevin Lockett; 85 Darnerien McCants; 34 Eric Metcalf; 16 Justin Skaggs; 88 Derrius Thompson; 82 Michael Westbrook; Tight ends (TE): 84 Marco Battaglia; 89 Zeron Flemister; 86 Walter Rasby	Offensive linemen (OL): 54 David Brandt G; 66 Matt Campbell G; 62 Ben Coleman G; 76 Jon Jansen T; 52 Cory Raymer C; 60 Chris Samuels T; 75 Alex Sulfsted T; 79 Dave Szott G; 68 Ross Tucker T; Defensive linemen (DL): 74 Donovan Arp DT; 99 Marco Coleman DE; 91 Delbert Cowsette DT; 92 Jerry DeLoach DT; 90 Kenard Lang DE/DT; 93 Otis Leverette DE; 73 Terrance Simmons DT; 78 Bruce Smith DE; 95 Dan Wilkinson DT	Linebackers (LB): 56 LaVar Arrington OLB; 57 Donté Curry MLB; 50 Robert Jones MLB; 98 Lemar Marshall OLB; 53 Eddie Mason OLB; 58 Antonio Pierce OLB; Defensive backs (DB): 24 Champ Bailey CB; 28 Darrell Green CB; 35 Keith Lyle FS; 26 Ifeanyi Ohalete SS; 22 Kato Serwanga CB; 29 Sam Shade SS; 21 Fred Smoot CB; 31 David Terrell FS; Special teams (ST): 77 Ethan Albright LS; 4 Bryan Barker P; 5 Brett Conway K	Practice squad: 27 Central McClellion CB; 97 Chaz Murphy LB; 96 Doug Sims DT; 39 Stanley Stephens RB; 45 Kenny Watson RB; Reserve: 80 Stephen Alexander TE (IR); 59 Shawn Barber LB (IR); -- Jauron Dailey LB (IR); 51 Mark Fischer C (IR); 25 Donovan Greer CB (IR); 55 Kevin Mitchell LB (IR); 53 active, 6 inactive, 5 practice squad Rookies in italics

== Regular season ==
=== Schedule ===
Week	Date	Opponent	Result	Record	Venue	Recap
1	September 9	at San Diego Chargers	L 3–30	0–1	Qualcomm Stadium	Recap
2 (Note: The Redskins were originally scheduled to host the Arizona Cardinals during Week 2 of the original NFL schedule (September 16) at FedExField. However, due to the September 11 attacks, the game was rescheduled to Week 17.)	September 24	at Green Bay Packers	L 0–37	0–2	Lambeau Field	Recap
3	September 30	Kansas City Chiefs	L 13–45	0–3	FedExField	Recap
4	October 7	at New York Giants	L 9–23	0–4	Giants Stadium	Recap
5	October 15	at Dallas Cowboys	L 7–9	0–5	Texas Stadium	Recap
6	October 21	Carolina Panthers	W 17–14	1–5	FedExField	Recap
7	October 28	New York Giants	W 35–21	2–5	FedExField	Recap
8	November 4	Seattle Seahawks	W 27–14	3–5	FedExField	Recap
9	Bye					
10	November 18	at Denver Broncos	W 17–10	4–5	Invesco Field at Mile High	Recap
11	November 25	at Philadelphia Eagles	W 13–3	5–5	Veterans Stadium	Recap
12	December 2	Dallas Cowboys	L 14–20	5–6	FedExField	Recap
13	December 9	at Arizona Cardinals	W 20–10	6–6	Sun Devil Stadium	Recap
14	December 16	Philadelphia Eagles	L 6–20	6–7	FedExField	Recap
15	December 23	Chicago Bears	L 15–20	6–8	FedExField	Recap
16	December 30	at New Orleans Saints	W 40–10	7–8	Louisiana Superdome	Recap
17	January 6	Arizona Cardinals	W 20–17	8–8	FedExField	Recap

=== Standings ===
NFC East
	W	L	T	PCT	PF	PA	STK
^{(3)} Philadelphia Eagles	11	5	0	.688	343	208	W2
Washington Redskins	8	8	0	.500	256	303	W2
New York Giants	7	9	0	.438	294	321	L2
Arizona Cardinals	7	9	0	.438	295	343	L1
Dallas Cowboys	5	11	0	.313	246	338	L1
