= Lance Legree =

American football player (born 1977)

No. 70, 99
- Positions: Defensive tackle, defensive end

Personal information
- Born: December 22, 1977 (age 48); St. Stephen, South Carolina, U.S.
- Listed height: 6 ft 1 in (1.85 m)
- Listed weight: 300 lb (136 kg)

Career information
- College: Notre Dame
- NFL draft: 2001: undrafted

Career history
- New York Giants (2001–2004); New York Jets (2005); San Francisco 49ers (2006)*; New York Giants (2006); San Francisco 49ers (2006); Tampa Bay Buccaneers (2007)*; New Orleans Saints (2007)*
- * Offseason or practice squad member only

Career NFL statistics
- Total tackles: 185
- Sacks: 7
- Forced fumbles: 1
- Fumble recoveries: 2
- Stats at Pro Football Reference

Lance Legree (born December 22, 1977) is an American former professional football player who was a defensive tackle in the National Football League (NFL). He played college football for the Notre Dame Fighting Irish and was signed by the New York Giants as an undrafted free agent in 2001.

== NFL career statistics ==
Legend
**Bold**	Career high

=== Regular season ===
Year	Team	Games		Tackles					Interceptions					Fumbles			
Year	Team	GP	GS	Cmb	Solo	Ast	Sck	TFL	Int	Yds	TD	Lng	PD	FF	FR	Yds	TD
2001	NYG	13	2	37	31	6	0.0	5	0	0	0	0	**1**	0	**1**	0	0
2002	NYG	15	**10**	40	25	15	0.0	**7**	0	0	0	0	0	0	0	0	0
2003	NYG	**16**	2	26	20	6	2.0	3	0	0	0	0	0	**1**	**1**	0	0
2004	NYG	15	7	**53**	**34**	**19**	2.0	3	0	0	0	0	0	0	0	0	0
2005	NYJ	**16**	4	29	21	8	**3.0**	5	0	0	0	0	0	0	0	0	0
2006	NYG	2	0	0	0	0	0.0	0	0	0	0	0	0	0	0	0	0
		77	25	185	131	54	7.0	23	0	0	0	0	1	1	2	0	0

=== Playoffs ===
Year	Team	Games		Tackles					Interceptions					Fumbles			
Year	Team	GP	GS	Cmb	Solo	Ast	Sck	TFL	Int	Yds	TD	Lng	PD	FF	FR	Yds	TD
2002	NYG	**1**	0	0	0	0	0.0	0	0	0	0	0	0	0	0	0	0
		1	0	0	0	0	0.0	0	0	0	0	0	0	0	0	0	0
