= Ifeanyi Ohalete =

American football player (born 1979)

No. 26, 25
- Position: Safety

Personal information
- Born: May 22, 1979 (age 47); Springfield, Illinois, U.S.
- Listed height: 6 ft 2 in (1.88 m)
- Listed weight: 221 lb (100 kg)

Career information
- High school: Los Alamitos (Los Alamitos, California)
- College: USC
- NFL draft: 2001: undrafted

Career history
- Washington Redskins (2001–2003); Arizona Cardinals (2004); Cincinnati Bengals (2005); New York Dragons (2007)

Career NFL statistics
- Games played: 78
- Games started: 50
- Interceptions: 8
- Touchdowns: 1
- Fumble recoveries: 5
- Stats at Pro Football Reference

Ifeanyi Ohalete (born May 22, 1979) is an American former professional football player who was a safety in the National Football League (NFL). He played college football for the USC Trojans.

== Early life ==
Ohalete born Springfield, Illinois. He attended and played football for Los Alamitos High School.

== College career ==
Ohalete played college football at the University of Southern California. He is remembered by many USC Trojans fans as the player who committed an unnecessary roughness penalty after a failed fourth down attempt giving the University of Notre Dame a crucial first down and allowing the Irish to complete a 21-point second half comeback in 1999.

== Professional career ==
Ohalete played for the Arizona Cardinals in 2004. He came to Arizona on waivers from the Washington Redskins, where he played 47 games with 24 starts from 2001 to 2003. He entered the NFL with Washington in 2001 as an undrafted free agent.

Ohalete played the 2005 season as the starting Strong Safety for the eventual 2005 AFC North Division Champion Cincinnati Bengals.

He played in 2007 for the New York Dragons of the Arena Football League, and was second on the team in tackles.

=== NFL statistics ===
Year	Team	GP	COMB	TOTAL	AST	SACK	FF	FR	FR YDS	INT	IR YDS	AVG IR	LNG	TD	PD
2001	WAS	16	9	7	2	0.0	0	0	0	1	12	12	12	0	1
2002	WAS	16	67	50	17	1.0	1	1	0	3	109	36	78	1	6
2003	WAS	15	103	80	23	0.0	0	1	0	3	60	20	30	0	8
2004	ARI	16	70	57	13	0.0	1	1	0	0	0	0	0	0	8
2005	CIN	15	56	41	15	0.0	0	0	0	1	15	15	15	0	2
Career		78	305	235	70	1.0	2	3	0	8	196	25	78	1	25

== Personal ==
Ohalete is of Nigerian descent. His father is a Nigerian immigrant from Mbano in Imo State.

Ohalete ran into some drama in 2004 with Clinton Portis of the Washington Redskins. Portis came to the Redskins in a blockbuster trade that involved Pro Bowl cornerback Champ Bailey. Portis had worn the number 26, and Ohalete had the number. Portis agreed to buy the rights to the number from Ohalete, but Ohalete later sued Portis to force payment. The case was settled before trial, but not before Portis challenged Ohalete to a boxing match to determine the rightful owner of the number. The match never happened.
