= Jonathan Carter (American football) =

American football player (born 1979)

No. 85, 84
- Position: Wide receiver

Personal information
- Born: March 20, 1979 (age 47); Anniston, Alabama, U.S.
- Listed height: 6 ft 0 in (1.83 m)
- Listed weight: 180 lb (82 kg)

Career information
- High school: Lineville (AL)
- College: Troy State
- NFL draft: 2001: 5th round, 162nd overall pick

Career history
- New York Giants (2001–2002); New York Jets (2002–2004); Tampa Bay Buccaneers (2006)*
- * Offseason or practice squad member only

Career NFL statistics
- Receptions: 14
- Receiving yards: 266
- Receiving TDs: 2
- Stats at Pro Football Reference

Jonathan Carter (born March 20, 1979) is an American former professional football player who was a wide receiver in the National Football League (NFL). He played college football for the Troy State Trojans

== Early life ==
Carter was named All-State, All-Area and team MVP as a junior and senior at Lineville (AL) High School. He was lettered four times in football and gained more than 1,900 yards receiving and 700 yards rushing for his high school career.

== College career ==
Carter played college football at Troy State University (now Troy University). He played only two seasons for the Trojans, totaling 46 catches for 869 yards and 11 touchdowns. Carter was an All-Southland Football League selection after starting every game as a senior in 2000, compiling 40 receptions for 632 yards and eight touchdowns, as well as ten kickoff returns for 286 yards and another score. He added seven carries for 88 yards, giving him an average of 91.5 All-purpose yards per game for the season. He also had a career game against Alabama State, gaining 111 yards on seven catches with two touchdowns. He played in 11 games in 1999, totaling six catches for 237 yards and three touchdowns. He recorded a career-long catch of 65 yards on a touchdown strike against Middle Tennessee State.

== Professional career ==
Carter was selected in the fifth round of the 2001 NFL draft by the New York Giants. As a rookie with the Giants, Carter appeared in two games and returned eight kickoffs for 155 yards and led the team with a 19.4-yard average per return. In 2002, he returned one kickoff for 14 yards in the Giants’ opener against San Francisco, but was waived by the Giants on October 8, 2002, and claimed by the New York Jets the next day. He was inactive for the Jets’ final 11 regular season games and both post season contests.

He scored a touchdown on his first career reception, the sixth Jets player to do so. He has played 22 games for the team, catching two touchdown passes and receiving a total of 266 yard passes. He has also played one post-season game for the team.

Carter was signed by the Tampa Bay Buccaneers in January, 2006, after four previous seasons split between the Giants and Jets in New York. Tampa Bay allocated him to the NFL Europe League for the 2006 season, but Carter never made it overseas, due to an injury suffered in the league's stateside joint training camp. He went instead to the NFLEL's facility in Birmingham to recover from his injury.

The Buccaneers were allowed to use Carter's roster exemption on another player from the NFL Europe League who was not already affiliated with an NFL team. Eventually, that exemption would have to be assumed by only one of the two players. Tampa Bay signed defensive end/long-snapper Jordan Hicks in June. When Carter returned to full health, the Buccaneers chose to leave the exemption with Hicks and released Carter.

== Personal ==
Carter majored in business at Troy State. He also served as a volunteer for the Jets’ JV Clinic, assisted in the Jets’ Blood Drive in May 2003, and participated in Santana Moss’ event with Operation SCORE (Seizing Control of Right Eating), where he manned one of six stations. The New York Jets players manned each station and taught children about stretching, aerobic exercise and conditioning. Carter also participated in the club's Football Fanfare/Kid Reporter of the Week Program with The Star Ledger by interviewing with a kid reporter after the club's 9/28 game vs. Dallas.

Carter also has a son named Jace and a daughter named Jaylee.

== Sources ==
- Jonathan Carter statistics
- "Tampa Bay Buccaneers". www.buccaneers.com.
