= Derrius Thompson =

American football player (born 1977)

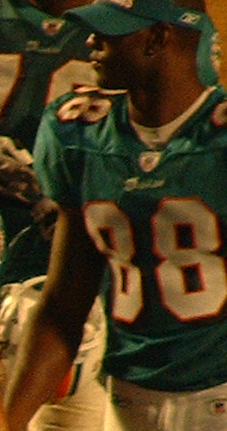
- Thompson with the Miami Dolphins in 2003

No. 84, 13, 88
- Position: Wide receiver

Personal information
- Born: July 5, 1977 (age 49); Dallas, Texas, U.S.
- Listed height: 6 ft 2 in (1.88 m)
- Listed weight: 220 lb (100 kg)

Career information
- High school: Cedar Hill (Cedar Hill, Texas)
- College: Baylor
- NFL draft: 1999: undrafted

Career history
- Washington Redskins (1999–2002); Miami Dolphins (2003–2004); New Orleans Saints (2006)*
- * Offseason or practice squad member only

Career NFL statistics
- Receptions: 105
- Receiving yards: 1,543
- Receiving touchdowns: 9
- Stats at Pro Football Reference

Derrius Damon Thompson (born July 5, 1977) is an American former professional football player who was a wide receiver in the National Football League (NFL) for the Washington Redskins and the Miami Dolphins. He played college football for the Baylor Bears.

== Biography ==
He graduated from Cedar Hill High School in Cedar Hill, Texas, in 1995. He majored sports management at Baylor University, playing college football for the Baylor Bears. He was signed by the Washington Redskins, as a undrafted free agent, in 1999. In 2003, he signed for the Miami Dolphins. Thompson famously caught the game winning touchdown against the eventual Super Bowl champions in the 2004 season.
