= Jason Whittle =

American football player (born 1975)

No. 62, 66, 65
- Position: Guard

Personal information
- Born: March 7, 1975 (age 51); Springfield, Missouri, U.S.
- Listed height: 6 ft 4 in (1.93 m)
- Listed weight: 305 lb (138 kg)

Career information
- High school: Camdenton (Camdenton, Missouri)
- College: Missouri State
- NFL draft: 1998: undrafted

Career history
- New York Giants (1998–2002); Tampa Bay Buccaneers (2003); New York Giants (2004–2005); Minnesota Vikings (2006); Buffalo Bills (2007–2008)

Awards and highlights
- Second-team All-GFC (1997)

Career NFL statistics
- Games played: 137
- Games started: 44
- Fumble recoveries: 1
- Stats at Pro Football Reference

Jason Whittle (born March 7, 1975) is an American former professional football player who was a guard in the National Football League (NFL). He played college football for the Southwest Missouri State Bears (now Missouri State).

== Early life and education ==
Whittle went to high school in Camdenton, Missouri, and played for the Camdenton Lakers. He majored in kinesiology at Southwest Missouri State University.

== Football career ==
Whittle spent four years at Southwest Missouri State University (now Missouri State University) playing college football for the Bears where, in 1995, he won the Arthur Briggs Award for being an outstanding scholar athlete.

Whittle was signed by the New York Giants as an undrafted free agent in 1998. He was part of New York Giants teams that won two NFC East titles in 2000 and 2005, and the NFC Championship in 2000. He played 11 years in the NFL as a guard and center. He played seven years for the New York Giants, one for the Tampa Bay Bucs, one for the Minnesota Vikings, and his last two for the Buffalo Bills.

== Personal life ==
Whittle is currently co-owner/broker of RE/MAX Lake of the Ozarks one of the top RE/MAX brokerages in the midstates region. He lives at Lake of the Ozarks in Missouri, with his wife Natalie and six children.

== See also ==
- History of the New York Giants (1994-present)
