= Marcellus Rivers =

American football player (born 1978)

No. 83, 84, 82
- Position: Tight end

Personal information
- Born: October 26, 1978 (age 48); Oklahoma City, Oklahoma, U.S.
- Listed height: 6 ft 4 in (1.93 m)
- Listed weight: 250 lb (113 kg)

Career information
- College: Oklahoma State
- NFL draft: 2001: undrafted

Career history
- New York Giants (2001–2004); Houston Texans (2005); Oakland Raiders (2006)*; New Orleans Saints (2006); New England Patriots (2007)
- * Offseason or practice squad member only

Career NFL statistics
- Receptions: 51
- Receiving yards: 395
- Receiving TDs: 4
- Stats at Pro Football Reference

Marcellus Rivers (born October 26, 1978) is an American former professional football player who was a tight end in the National Football League (NFL). He was signed by the New York Giants as an undrafted free agent in 2001. He played college football for the Oklahoma State Cowboys.

Rivers played on the Houston Texans, New England Patriots, and the New York Giants. After retiring, he took up coaching in Dallas, Texas. He is currently an assistant football coach of the varsity football team at Prestonwood Christian Academy. He is also the coach of the 7th grade gold basketball ball team there and high school and middle school track team.
