= 2002 New York Giants season =

NFL team season

- Owner: Wellington Mara; Robert Tisch
- General manager: Ernie Accorsi
- Head coach: Jim Fassel
- Home stadium: Giants Stadium

Results
- Record: 10–6
- Division place: 2nd NFC East
- Playoffs: Lost Wild Card Playoffs (at 49ers) 38–39
- Pro Bowlers: 2: TE Jeremy Shockey; DE Michael Strahan

Uniform
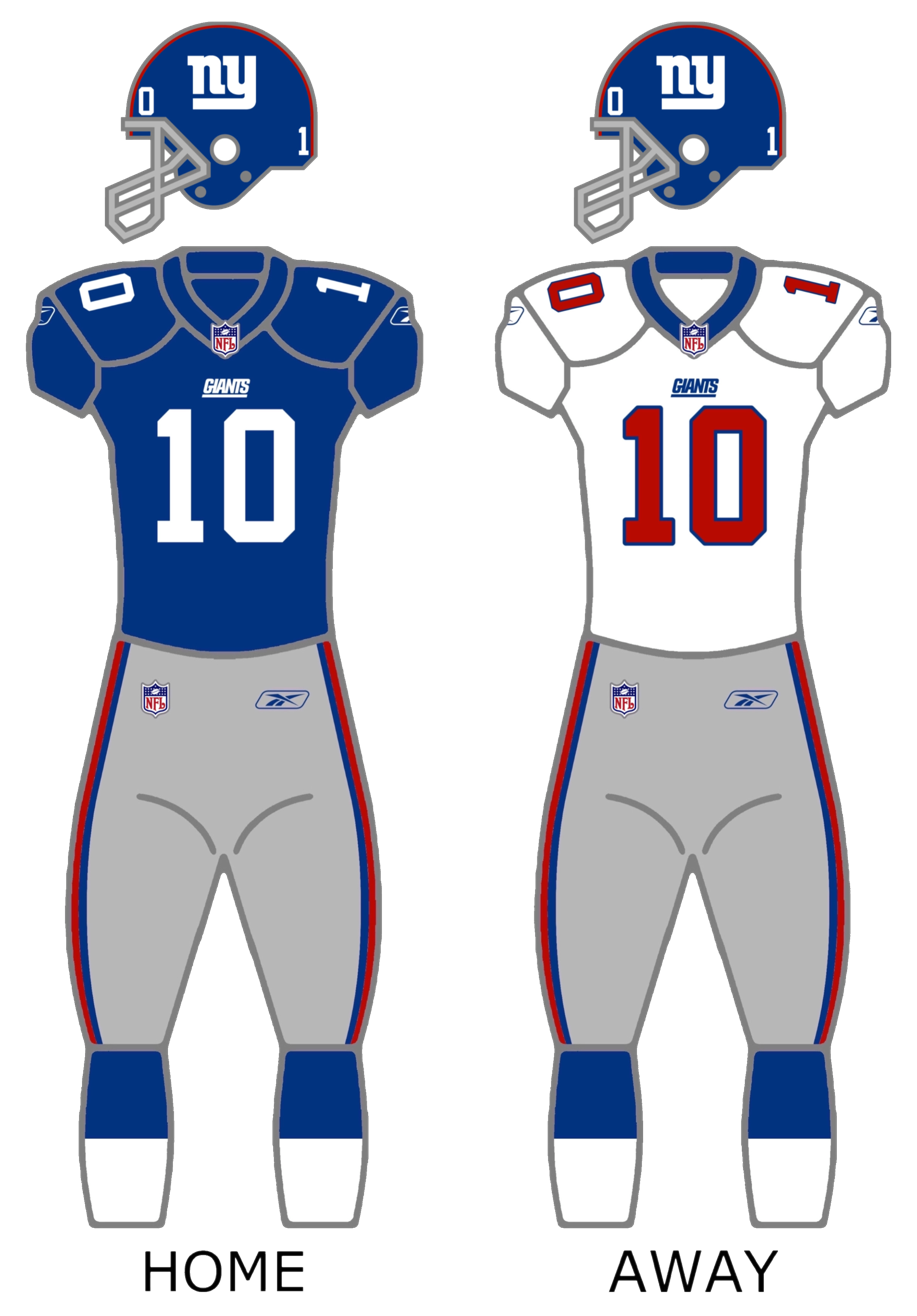

The 2002 season was the New York Giants' 78th in the National Football League (NFL) and their sixth under head coach Jim Fassel. The team improved upon their 7–9 record from the previous season by three games and returned to the playoffs for the second time in three years, ending the season on a four-game winning streak. After a midseason slump, head coach Jim Fassel stripped offensive coordinator Sean Payton of playcalling duties, and the Giants went on to a winning streak that would carry them to the playoffs.

Leading 35–14 in the third quarter of the NFC wild-card came at San Francisco, rookie tight end Jeremy Shockey dropped a touchdown pass forcing a field goal to make the score 38–14. The 49ers gained momentum after that, scoring 25 straight points, and the Giants did not score again, losing the game 39–38. Following the season, Payton was not retained; he won the Super Bowl seven years later as the head coach of the New Orleans Saints.

== Offseason ==
Additions	Subtractions
DE Byron Frisch (Cowboys)	K Morten Andersen (Chiefs)
	LB Jessie Armstead (Redskins)
	T Lomas Brown (Buccaneers)
	G Ron Stone (49ers)
	FS Sam Garnes (Jets)
	WR Joe Jurevicius (Buccaneers)

=== NFL draft ===
2002 New York Giants draft
Round	Pick	Player	Position	College	Notes
1	14	Jeremy Shockey *	Tight end	Miami (FL)	from Tennessee
2	46	Tim Carter	Wide receiver	Auburn	
3	78	Jeff Hatch	Offensive tackle	Penn	
5	152	Nick Greisen	Linebacker	Wisconsin	
6	188	Wesly Mallard	Linebacker	Oregon	
7	226	Daryl Jones	Wide receiver	Miami (FL)	
7	245	Quincy Monk	Linebacker	North Carolina	
Made roster * Made at least one Pro Bowl during career

=== Undrafted free agents ===
2002 undrafted free agents of note
Player	Position	College
Matt Bryant	K	Baylor
Ryan Clark	S	LSU
Calvin Coleman	CB	Montana
Pat Crummey	OG	Youngstown State
Ryan Deterding	OT	Chadron State
Sean Guthrie	DE	Boston College
Karon Key	FB	Tennessee State
Gade Lindstrom	P	Toledo
Matt Mitrione	DT	Purdue
Delvin Joyce	RB	James Madison
Charles Stackhouse	FB	Ole Miss
David Thompson	WR	Holy Cross

== Staff ==
2002 New York Giants staff
Front office: President and co-chief executive officer – Wellington Mara; Chairman and co-chief executive officer – Preston Robert Tisch; Executive vice president and general counsel – John Mara; Vice president and general manager – Ernie Accorsi; Assistant general manager – Kevin Abrams; Director of player personnel – Jerry Reese; Director of pro personnel – David Gettleman; Director of college scouting – Jerry Shay; Assistant director of pro personnel – Ken Sternfeld; Head coaches: Head coach – Jim Fassel; Offensive coaches: Offensive coordinator/quarterbacks – Sean Payton; Running backs – Eric Studesville; Wide receivers – Jimmy Robinson; Tight ends – Mike Pope; Offensive line – Jim McNally; Offensive quality control – Jay Robertson	Defensive coaches: Defensive coordinator – Johnnie Lynn; Defensive line – Denny Marcin; Linebackers – Tom Olivadotti; Defensive backs – DeWayne Walker; Senior defensive analyst – Dave Brazil; Defensive quality control – Rod Rust; Special teams coaches: Special teams – Bruce Read; Strength and conditioning: Strength and conditioning – John Dunn; Assistant strength and conditioning – Craig Stoddard

== Roster ==
2002 New York Giants roster
Quarterbacks (QB): 5 Kerry Collins; 17 Jason Garrett; 3 Jesse Palmer; Running backs (RB): 21 Tiki Barber; 27 Ron Dayne; 33 Delvin Joyce; 45 Charles Stackhouse FB; Wide receivers (WR): 86 Ron Dixon; 85 Derek Dorris; 87 Daryl Jones; 15 Tony Simmons; 81 Amani Toomer; Tight ends (TE): 89 Dan Campbell; 83 Marcellus Rivers; 80 Jeremy Shockey	Offensive linemen (OL): 74 Ian Allen T; 67 Chris Bober C; 72 Barrett Brooks T; 65 Tam Hopkins G; 77 Luke Petitgout T; 78 Mike Rosenthal T; 69 Rich Seubert G; 68 Omar Smith C; 66 Jason Whittle G; Defensive linemen (DL): 95 Frank Ferrara DE; 99 Byron Frisch DE; 97 Cornelius Griffin DT; 90 Kenny Holmes DE; 94 Dwight Johnson DT; 96 Ross Kolodziej DT; 70 Lance Legree DT; 98 Matt Mitrione DT; 92 Michael Strahan DE	Linebackers (LB): 58 Micheal Barrow MLB; 54 Nick Greisen OLB; 55 Dhani Jones OLB; 59 Kevin Lewis MLB; 51 Wesly Mallard OLB; 93 Quincy Monk OLB; 53 Brandon Short OLB; Defensive backs (DB): 25 Will Allen CB; 22 Ralph Brown CB; 37 Johnnie Harris SS; 28 DeWayne Patmon FS; 24 Will Peterson CB; 31 Jason Sehorn CB; 26 Kato Serwanga CB; 34 Reggie Stephens CB; 23 Omar Stoutmire FS; 36 Shaun Williams SS; Special teams (ST): 12 Matt Allen P; 8 Matt Bryant K; 44 Dan O'Leary LS	Practice squad: 49 Taman Bryant TE; 39 Ryan Clark S; 60 Pat Crummey G; 64 Sean O'Connor G; 18 Chris Taylor WR; Reserve: 84 Tim Carter WR (IR); 41 Darnell Dinkins S (IR); 71 Sean Guthrie DE (IR); 75 Keith Hamilton DT (IR); 76 Jeff Hatch T (IR); 88 Ike Hilliard WR (IR); 35 Clarence LeBlanc S (IR); 9 Owen Pochman K (IR); 29 Damon Washington RB (IR); 57 Clayton White LB (PUP); 52 Dusty Zeigler G (IR); 38 Adam Wright RB (IR); Rookies in italics 53 active, 12 reserve, 5 practice squad

== Preseason ==
Week	Date	Opponent	Result	Record	Venue	Recap
HOF	August 5	Houston Texans	W 34–17	1–0	Fawcett Stadium (Canton)	Recap
1	August 10	New England Patriots	W 22–19	2–0	Giants Stadium	Recap
2	August 17	at Atlanta Falcons	L 24–36	2–1	Georgia Dome	Recap
3	August 24	at New York Jets	L 7–28	2–2	Giants Stadium	Recap
4	August 29	Baltimore Ravens	W 13–0	3–2	Giants Stadium	Recap

== Regular season ==
=== Schedule ===
Week	Date	Opponent	Result	Record	Venue	Recap
1	September 5	San Francisco 49ers	**L** 13–16	0–1	Giants Stadium	Recap
2	September 15	at St. Louis Rams	**W** 26–21	1–1	Edward Jones Dome	Recap
3	September 22	Seattle Seahawks	**W** 9–6	2–1	Giants Stadium	Recap
4	September 29	at Arizona Cardinals	**L** 7–21	2–2	Sun Devil Stadium	Recap
5	October 6	at **Dallas Cowboys**	**W** 21–17	3–2	Texas Stadium	Recap
6	October 13	Atlanta Falcons	**L** 10–17	3–3	Giants Stadium	Recap
7	Bye					
8	October 28	at **Philadelphia Eagles**	**L** 3–17	3–4	Veterans Stadium	Recap
9	November 3	Jacksonville Jaguars	**W** 24–17	4–4	Giants Stadium	Recap
10	November 10	at Minnesota Vikings	**W** 27–20	5–4	Hubert H. Humphrey Metrodome	Recap
11	November 17	**Washington Redskins**	**W** 19–17	6–4	Giants Stadium	Recap
12	November 24	at Houston Texans	**L** 14–16	6–5	Reliant Stadium	Recap
13	December 1	Tennessee Titans	**L** 29–32 (OT)	6–6	Giants Stadium	Recap
14	December 8	at **Washington Redskins**	**W** 27–21	7–6	FedExField	Recap
15	December 15	**Dallas Cowboys**	**W** 37–7	8–6	Giants Stadium	Recap
16	December 22	at Indianapolis Colts	**W** 44–27	9–6	RCA Dome	Recap
17	December 28	**Philadelphia Eagles**	**W** 10–7 (OT)	10–6	Giants Stadium	Recap
Note: Intra-division opponents are in **bold** text.

=== Game summaries ===
==== Week 1: vs. San Francisco 49ers ====
Week 1: San Francisco 49ers at New York Giants – game summary

Quarter	1	2	3	4	Total
**49ers**	3	0	7	6	**16**
Giants	3	3	0	7	**13**

at Giants Stadium, East Rutherford, New Jersey

- Date: September 5
- Game time: 8:30 p.m. EDT
- Game weather: Clear, 72 °F (22 °C)
- Game attendance: 78,748
- Referee: Gerry Austin
- TV announcers (ESPN): Mike Patrick, Joe Theismann, Paul Maguire and Suzy Kolber

Game information

**First quarter**

- NYG – Matt Bryant 29-yard field goal, 5:52. Giants 3–0. **Drive: 11 plays, 69 yards, 5:59.**
- SF – José Cortez 23-yard field goal, 1:00. Tied 3–3. **Drive: 9 plays, 63 yards, 4:52.**

**Second quarter**

- NYG – Matt Bryant 33-yard field goal, 0:00. Giants 6–3. **Drive: 8 plays, 47 yards, 1:03.**

**Third quarter**

- SF – Garrison Hearst 9-yard pass from Jeff Garcia (José Cortez kick), 1:51. 49ers 10–6. **Drive: 8 plays, 52 yards, 4:26.**

**Fourth quarter**

- SF – José Cortez 33-yard field goal, 8:08. 49ers 13–6. **Drive: 9 plays, 49 yards, 4:54.**
- NYG – Tiki Barber 1-yard run (Matt Bryant kick), 1:55. Tied 13–13. **Drive: 14 plays, 77 yards, 6:13.**
- SF – José Cortez 36-yard field goal, 0:06. 49ers 16–13. **Drive: 6 plays, 52 yards, 1:49.**

**Top passers**

- SF – Jeff Garcia – 16/26, 166 yards, TD, INT
- NYG – Kerry Collins – 28/45, 342 yards, 3 INT

**Top rushers**

- SF – Garrison Hearst – 12 rushes, 40 yards
- NYG – Tiki Barber – 15 rushes, 29 yards, TD

**Top receivers**

- SF – Eric Johnson – 3 receptions, 44 yards
- NYG – Amani Toomer – 9 receptions, 134 yards

The Giants opened their 2002 season at home against the 49ers, in a preview of their infamous Wild Card game later that season. This was the first-ever Thursday night NFL season opener.

The Giants led 6–3 at halftime, with new kicker Matt Bryant kicking field goals of 29 and 33 yards. In the third quarter, 49ers quarterback Jeff Garcia found running back Garrison Hearst for a 9-yard touchdown pass to make it 10–6. After a Jose Cortez field goal made it 13-6 49ers with 8 minutes to go, Tiki Barber ran in for a 1-yard touchdown to tie the game at 13–13 with 1:55 to go. However, the Giants defense failed to hold at the end of the game. A 33-yard pass from Garcia to Terrell Owens set up a 36-yard field goal by Cortez with 6 seconds left to win the game for the 49ers.

For the Giants, Amani Toomer caught nine passes for 134 yards.

==== Week 2: at St. Louis Rams ====
Week 2: New York Giants at St. Louis Rams – game summary

Quarter	1	2	3	4	Total
**Giants**	3	14	3	6	**26**
Rams	0	7	7	7	**21**

at Edward Jones Dome, St. Louis, Missouri

- Date: September 15
- Game time: 4:05 p.m. EDT/3:05 p.m. CDT
- Game weather: None (indoor stadium)
- Game attendance: 65,932
- Referee: Dick Hantak
- TV announcers (Fox): Joe Buck, Cris Collinsworth, Troy Aikman and Pam Oliver

Game information

**First quarter**

- NYG – Matt Bryant 20-yard field goal, 9:54. Giants 3–0. **Drive: 9 plays, 68 yards, 5:06.**

**Second quarter**

- NYG – Jeremy Shockey 28-yard pass from Kerry Collins (Matt Bryant kick), 10:29. Giants 10–0. **Drive: 8 plays, 75 yards, 3:43.**
- NYG – Jason Sehorn 31-yard interception return (Matt Bryant kick), 9:44. Giants 17–0.
- STL – Ricky Proehl 6-yard pass from Kurt Warner (Jeff Wilkins kick), 4:38. Giants 17–7. **Drive: 12 plays, 80 yards, 5:06.**

**Third quarter**

- STL – Marshall Faulk 1-yard run (Jeff Wilkins kick), 11:44. Giants 17–14. **Drive: 6 plays, 66 yards, 3:16.**
- NYG – Matt Bryant 32-yard field goal, 6:08. Giants 20–14. **Drive: 11 plays, 61 yards, 5:36.**

**Fourth quarter**

- NYG – Matt Bryant 34-yard field goal, 11:47. Giants 23–14. **Drive: 12 plays, 66 yards, 5:34.**
- STL – Marshall Faulk 8-yard run (Jeff Wilkins kick), 8:24. Giants 23–21. **Drive: 6 plays, 69 yards, 3:23.**
- NYG – Matt Bryant 25-yard field goal, 4:19. Giants 26–21. **Drive: 8 plays, 72 yards, 4:05.**

**Top passers**

- NYG – Kerry Collins – 22/26, 307 yards, TD, INT
- STL – Kurt Warner – 26/39, 266 yards, TD, 2 INT

**Top rushers**

- NYG – Tiki Barber – 19 rushes, 80 yards
- STL – Marshall Faulk – 14 rushes, 87 yards, 2 TD

**Top receivers**

- NYG – Ike Hilliard – 4 receptions, 97 yards
- STL – Torry Holt – 6 receptions, 88 yards

The Giants next traveled to St. Louis to take on the defending NFC champion Rams, who were favored by 12 to defeat the Giants. However, the Giants jumped out to a 17–0 lead in the first half. In the second quarter, Kerry Collins found rookie tight end Jeremy Shockey for his first career touchdown on a 28-yard pass. Later in the quarter, Jason Sehorn picked off Kurt Warner and returned his errant pass 31 yards for a touchdown. The Rams finally got on the board with Warner finding receiver Ricky Proehl for a 6-yard touchdown to make the score 17–7 Giants at the half.

In the third quarter, Marshall Faulk scored a touchdown to narrow the score to 17–14. After two Matt Bryant field goals, Faulk scored another touchdown from 8 yards out to make the score 23–21 with 8:24 to go. The Giants finally clinched the game when cornerback Will Allen intercepted a Kurt Warner pass with 1:43 remaining.

Kerry Collins was 22 of 26 for 307 yards and a touchdown with an interception. Ike Hilliard was the leading receiver with 4 receptions for 97 yards, while Amani Toomer added 4 catches for 92 yards. The defense forced 4 Rams turnovers against just one by the Giants.

==== Week 3: vs. Seattle Seahawks ====
Week 3: Seattle Seahawks (0–2) at New York Giants (1–1) – game summary

Quarter	1	2	3	4	Total
Seahawks	3	3	0	0	**6**
**Giants**	0	0	3	6	**9**

at Giants Stadium, East Rutherford, New Jersey

- Date: September 22
- Game time: 4:15 p.m. EDT
- Game weather: Clear, 82 °F (28 °C)
- Game attendance: 78,551
- Referee: Jeff Triplette
- TV announcers (Fox): Sam Rosen, Bill Maas, and Brent Ringenbach

Game information

**First quarter**

- SEA – Rian Lindell 42-yard field goal, 6:24. Seahawks 3–0. **Drive: 9 plays, 34 yards, 4:55.**

**Second quarter**

- SEA – Rian Lindell 27-yard field goal, 4:05. Seahawks 6–0. **Drive: 9 plays, 39 yards, 3:21.**

**Third quarter**

- NYG – Matt Bryant 33-yard field goal, 8:06. Seahawks 6–3. **Drive: 16 plays, 69 yards, 6:54.**

**Fourth quarter**

- NYG – Matt Bryant 21-yard field goal, 12:05. Tied 6–6. **Drive: 7 plays, 50 yards, 3:55.**
- NYG – Matt Bryant 47-yard field goal, 2:04. Giants 9–6. **Drive: 11 plays, 65 yards, 6:00.**

**Top passers**

- SEA – Trent Dilfer – 16/25, 118 yards, INT
- NYG – Kerry Collins – 23/38, 282 yards

**Top rushers**

- SEA – Shaun Alexander – 14 rushes, 37 yards
- NYG – Tiki Barber – 21 rushes, 50 yards

**Top receivers**

- SEA – Darrell Jackson – 7 receptions, 54 yards
- NYG – Amani Toomer – 4 receptions, 100 yards

Next came a contest against the Seahawks that did not feature a touchdown. The Giants trailed 6–0 at halftime after two Rian Lindell field goals, but Matt Bryant kicked three field goals in the second half, the last one a 47 yarder coming with 2:04 remaining. As he had the previous week, Will Allen clinched the game by intercepting a Trent Dilfer pass with 1:35 remaining.

The Giants held the Seahawks to just 145 yards of total offense. Amani Toomer caught four passes for 100 yards.

==== Week 4: at Arizona Cardinals ====
Week 4: New York Giants (2–1) at Arizona Cardinals (1–2) – game summary

Quarter	1	2	3	4	Total
Giants	7	0	0	0	**7**
**Cardinals**	0	7	0	14	**21**

at Sun Devil Stadium, Tempe, Arizona

- Date: September 29
- Game time: 4:05 p.m. EDT/2:05 p.m. MDT
- Game weather: Scattered clouds, 90 °F (32 °C)
- Game attendance: 30,014
- Referee: Mike Carey
- TV announcers (Fox): Dick Stockton, Daryl Johnston and Ron Pitts

Game information

**First quarter**

- NYG – Tiki Barber 6-yard run (Matt Bryant kick), 8:38. Giants 7–0. **Drive: 8 plays, 46 yards, 4:21.**

**Second quarter**

- ARI – Justin Lucas 38-yard interception return (Bill Gramatica kick), 0:04. Tied 7–7.

**Third quarter**

- No scoring plays.

**Fourth quarter**

- ARI – Marcel Shipp 7-yard pass from Jake Plummer (Bill Gramatica kick), 10:36. Cardinals 14–7. **Drive: 8 plays, 67 yards, 3:28.**
- ARI – Marcel Shipp 10-yard run (Bill Gramatica kick), 2:13. Cardinals 21–7. **Drive: 12 plays, 78 yards, 6:18.**

**Top passers**

- NYG – Kerry Collins – 19/36, 199 yards, 2 INT
- ARI – Jake Plummer – 23/32, 168 yards, TD

**Top rushers**

- NYG – Tiki Barber – 13 rushes, 55 yards, TD
- ARI – Marcel Shipp – 17 rushes, 92 yards, TD

**Top receivers**

- NYG – Jeremy Shockey – 4 receptions, 56 yards
- ARI – Marcel Shipp – 5 receptions, 39 yards, TD

**Team** – pass – rush – total – to

- NYG – 199 – 67 – 263 – 3
- ARI – 168 – 102 – 263 – 1

The Giants completed their NFC West cycle with a poor performance against the Cardinals. The Giants struck first with Tiki Barber running in for a 6-yard touchdown in the first quarter. However, in the second quarter, Kerry Collins was intercepted by Justin Lucas, who returned the pick 38 yards for a touchdown to tie the score at 7–7 at the half. In the fourth quarter, Cardinals running back Marcel Shipp scored two touchdowns. The first one was on a 7-yard pass from quarterback Jake Plummer to give the Cardinals a 14–7 lead with 10:36 to go, and the second touchdown was a 10-yard run to clinch the game with 2:13 left.

Both teams gained 263 yards in this contest. However, the Cardinals won the turnover battle 3–1 and time of possession 36:05 to 23:55.

==== Week 5: at Dallas Cowboys ====
Week 5: New York Giants at Dallas Cowboys – game summary

Quarter	1	2	3	4	Total
**Giants**	0	14	0	7	**21**
Cowboys	0	10	0	7	**17**

at Texas Stadium, Irving, Texas

- Date: October 6
- Game time: 1:00 p.m. EDT/12:00 p.m. CDT
- Game weather: Mostly cloudy, 86 °F (30 °C)
- Game attendance: 63,447
- Referee: Bill Leavy
- TV announcers (Fox): Pat Summerall, Brian Baldinger, and Mike Doocy

Game information

**First quarter**

- No scoring plays.

**Second quarter**

- NYG – Ike Hilliard 12-yard pass from Kerry Collins (Matt Bryant kick), 14:55. Giants 7–0. **Drive: 12 plays, 73 yards, 6:41.**
- DAL – Emmitt Smith 30-yard run (Billy Cundiff kick), 5:40. Tied 7–7. **Drive: 3 plays, 52 yards, 1:22.**
- NYG – Amani Toomer 56-yard pass from Kerry Collins (Matt Bryant kick), 4:11. Giants 14–7. **Drive: 3 plays, 78 yards, 1:29.**
- DAL – Billy Cundiff 32-yard field goal, 0:24. Giants 14–10. **Drive: 9 plays, 45 yards, 3:47.**

**Third quarter**

- No scoring plays.

**Fourth quarter**

- DAL – Antonio Bryant 5-yard pass from Quincy Carter (Billy Cundiff kick), 10:52. Cowboys 17–14. **Drive: 13 plays, 57 yards, 5:56.**
- NYG – Marcellus Rivers 17-yard pass from Kerry Collins (Matt Bryant kick), 6:51. Giants 21–17. **Drive: 8 plays, 80 yards, 4:01.**

**Top passers**

- NYG – Kerry Collins – 18/27, 228 yards, 3 TD, INT
- DAL – Quincy Carter – 23/42, 262 yards, TD

**Top rushers**

- NYG – Tiki Barber – 17 rushes, 94 yards
- DAL – Emmitt Smith – 13 rushes, 70 yards, TD

**Top receivers**

- NYG – Amani Toomer – 5 receptions, 98 yards, TD
- DAL – Joey Galloway – 8 receptions, 109 yards

==== Week 6: vs. Atlanta Falcons ====
Week 6: Atlanta Falcons at New York Giants – game summary

Quarter	1	2	3	4	Total
**Falcons**	0	10	0	7	**17**
Giants	0	3	7	0	**10**

at Giants Stadium, East Rutherford, New Jersey

- Date: October 13
- Game time: 1:00 p.m. EDT
- Game weather: Drizzle, 61 °F (16 °C)
- Game attendance: 78,728
- Referee: Bob McElwee
- TV announcers (Fox): Kenny Albert, Daryl Johnston and Ron Pitts

Game information

**First quarter**

- No scoring plays.

**Second quarter**

- ATL – Doug Johnson 15-yard run (Jay Feely kick), 14:49. Falcons 7–0. **Drive: 17 plays, 88 yards, 9:34.**
- NYG – Matt Bryant 38-yard field goal, 4:31. Falcons 7–3. **Drive: 13 plays, 78 yards, 5:41.**
- ATL – Jay Feely 31-yard field goal, 0:30. Falcons 10–3. **Drive: 7 plays, 53 yards, 4:01.**

**Third quarter**

- NYG – Ike Hilliard 18-yard pass from Kerry Collins (Matt Bryant kick), 8:10. Tied 10–10. **Drive: 12 plays, 70 yards, 6:50.**

**Fourth quarter**

- ATL – Brian Finneran 14-yard pass from Doug Johnson (Jay Feely kick), 8:06. Falcons 17–10. **Drive: 6 plays, 94 yards, 3:33.**

**Top passers**

- ATL – Doug Johnson – 19/25, 257 yards, TD
- NYG – Kerry Collins – 20/31, 204 yards, TD, INT

**Top rushers**

- ATL – T. J. Duckett – 16 rushes, 36 yards
- NYG – Tiki Barber – 14 rushes, 57 yards

**Top receivers**

- ATL – Shawn Jefferson – 3 receptions, 84 yards
- NYG – Ike Hilliard – 7 receptions, 76 yards, TD

==== Week 8: at Philadelphia Eagles ====
Week 8: New York Giants at Philadelphia Eagles – game summary

Quarter	1	2	3	4	Total
Giants	0	3	0	0	**3**
**Eagles**	3	6	0	8	**17**

at Veterans Stadium, Philadelphia, Pennsylvania

- Date: October 28
- Game time: 9:00 p.m. EST
- Game weather: Scattered clouds, 47 °F (8 °C)
- Game attendance: 65,791
- Referee: Bill Carollo
- TV announcers (ABC): Al Michaels, John Madden and Melissa Stark

Game information

**First quarter**

- PHI – David Akers 27-yard field goal, 2:08. Eagles 3–0. **Drive: 11 plays, 53 yards, 5:15.**

**Second quarter**

- NYG – Matt Bryant 26-yard field goal, 12:55. Tied 3–3. **Drive: 10 plays, 60 yards, 4:13.**
- PHI – David Akers 36-yard field goal, 5:23. Eagles 6–3. **Drive: 16 plays, 70 yards, 7:32.**
- PHI – David Akers 35-yard field goal, 0:43. Eagles 9–3. **Drive: 9 plays, 48 yards, 2:26.**

**Third quarter**

- No scoring plays.

**Fourth quarter**

- PHI – Donovan McNabb 40-yard run (Donovan McNabb–Chad Lewis pass), 10:30. Eagles 17–3. **Drive: 9 plays, 99 yards, 3:33.**

**Top passers**

- NYG – Kerry Collins – 20/34, 251 yards
- PHI – Donovan McNabb – 14/30, 157 yards

**Top rushers**

- NYG – Tiki Barber – 15 rushes, 79 yards
- PHI – Duce Staley – 24 rushes, 126 yards

**Top receivers**

- NYG – Tiki Barber – 5 receptions, 92 yards
- PHI – James Thrash – 7 receptions, 69 yards

==== Week 9: vs. Jacksonville Jaguars ====
Week 9: Jacksonville Jaguars at New York Giants – game summary

Quarter	1	2	3	4	Total
Jaguars	0	0	3	14	**17**
**Giants**	7	7	10	0	**24**

at Giants Stadium, East Rutherford, New Jersey

- Date: November 3
- Game time: 8:30 p.m. EST
- Game weather: Overcast, 43 °F (6 °C)
- Game attendance: 78,337
- Referee: Johnny Grier
- TV announcers (ESPN): Mike Patrick, Joe Theismann, Paul Maguire and Suzy Kolber

Game information

**First quarter**

- NYG – Tiki Barber 2-yard run (Matt Bryant kick), 10:54. Giants 7–0. **Drive: 7 plays, 56 yards, 2:39.**

**Second quarter**

- NYG – Ron Dixon 8-yard pass from Kerry Collins (Matt Bryant kick), 0:09. Giants 14–0. **Drive: 11 plays, 68 yards, 4:12.**

**Third quarter**

- NYG – Matt Bryant 27-yard field goal, 11:54. Giants 17–0. **Drive: 8 plays, 58 yards, 3:06.**
- NYG – Tiki Barber 44-yard run (Matt Bryant kick), 7:18. Giants 24–0. **Drive: 2 plays, 53 yards, 0:46.**
- JAC – Tim Seder 24-yard field goal, 3:16. Giants 24–3. **Drive: 8 plays, 61 yards, 4:02.**

**Fourth quarter**

- JAC – Bobby Shaw 14-yard pass from Mark Brunell (Tim Seder kick), 5:20. Giants 24–10. **Drive: 15 plays, 67 yards, 7:41.**
- JAC – Jimmy Smith 9-yard pass from Mark Brunell (Tim Seder kick), 1:47. Giants 24–17. **Drive: 8 plays, 80 yards, 2:24.**

**Top passers**

- JAC – Mark Brunell – 23/38, 230 yards, 2 TD
- NYG – Kerry Collins – 20/28, 228 yards, TD

**Top rushers**

- JAC – Mark Brunell – 5 rushes, 63 yards, TD
- NYG – Tiki Barber – 19 rushes, 101 yards, 2 TD

**Top receivers**

- JAC – Jimmy Smith – 10 receptions, 123 yards, TD
- NYG – Tiki Barber – 4 receptions, 62 yards

==== Week 10: at Minnesota Vikings ====
Week 10: New York Giants (4–4) at Minnesota Vikings (2–6) – Game summary

Quarter	1	2	3	4	Total
**Giants**	7	6	6	8	**27**
Vikings	0	3	3	14	**20**

at Hubert H. Humphrey Metrodome, Minneapolis, Minnesota

- Date: November 10
- Game time: 1:00 p.m. EST/12:00 p.m. CST
- Game weather: None (indoor stadium)
- Game attendance: 64,005
- Referee: Tony Corrente
- TV announcers (FOX): Dick Stockton, Daryl Johnston and Ron Pitts

Game information

**First quarter**

- NYG – Charles Stackhouse 1-yard pass from Kerry Collins (Matt Bryant kick), 6:10. Giants 7–0. **Drive: 3 plays, 23 yards, 1:35.**

**Second quarter**

- MIN – Gary Anderson 20-yard field goal, 12:36. Giants 7–3. **Drive: 10 plays, 51 yards, 5:07.**
- NYG – Ron Dayne 30-yard run (run failed), 8:48. Giants 13–3. **Drive: 7 plays, 72 yards, 3:48.**

**Third quarter**

- MIN – Gary Anderson 27-yard field goal, 9:11. Giants 13–6. **Drive: 7 plays, 48 yards, 3:02.**
- NYG – Amani Toomer 11-yard pass from Kerry Collins (kick failed), 0:22. Giants 19–6. **Drive: 6 plays, 91 yards, 3:04.**

**Fourth quarter**

- MIN – Moe Williams 1-yard run (Gary Anderson kick), 12:06. Giants 19–13. **Drive: 3 plays, 81 yards, 1:11.**
- MIN – Michael Bennett 78-yard run (Gary Anderson kick), 8:36. Vikings 20–19. **Drive: 2 plays, 78 yards, 0:16.**
- NYG – Tiki Barber 8-yard run (Kerry Collins–Marcellus Rivers pass), 2:43. Giants 27–20. **Drive: 10 plays, 80 yards, 5:53.**

**Top passers**

- NYG – Kerry Collins – 25/35, 300 yards, 2 TD, INT
- MIN – Daunte Culpepper – 9/20, 91 yards

**Top rushers**

- NYG – Tiki Barber – 24 rushes, 127 yards, TD
- MIN – Michael Bennett – 15 rushes, 167 yards, TD

**Top receivers**

- NYG – Ron Dixon – 4 receptions, 107 yards
- MIN – Randy Moss – 3 receptions, 85 yards

The Giants took on the Vikings in a midseason contest at the Metrodome. The Giants took charge early, with Kerry Collins finding Charles Stackhouse for a 1-yard touchdown to make the score 7–0. In the second quarter Ron Dayne ran in for a 30-yard touchdown, with a failed two-point conversion making the score 13–3 at the half. Late in the third quarter, Collins found Amani Toomer for an 11-yard touchdown, and the Giants led 19–6 at the start of the fourth quarter. While the Giants flourished offensively, Vikings quarterback Daunte Culpepper struggled mightily. He completed just 9 of 20 passes, with many of his passes not even close to reaching his receivers. Due to his inability to perform and lack of confidence in this contest, Vikings head coach Mike Tice decided to have him take the rest of the day off.

To replace Culpepper, Tice put in Todd Bouman, a local product from St. Cloud State University. Immediately after he went in, the Vikings' fortunes changed. Early in the fourth quarter, Bouman threw a 48-yard bomb to Randy Moss, which set up a 1-yard touchdown by running back Moe Williams. The lead was now 19–13 Giants. On the next Vikings possession, the Vikings ran a draw play where the fastest man in the NFL, Michael Bennett, took off for a 78-yard touchdown. With 8:36 to go, the Vikings were now leading 20–19 in a contest the Giants had dominated. The Giants recovered, however, and Tiki Barber ran in for an 8-yard touchdown with 2:43 to go. On the two-point conversion, the Giants were thrown a life preserver when a Vikings player dropped an interception, with rookie tight end Marcellus Rivers catching the loose ball to make the score 27–20 Giants. The Giants forced a punt on the next Vikings possession when Kenny Holmes sacked Bouman on a third down play to essentially clinch the game.

Kerry Collins was 25 of 35 for 300 yards and two touchdowns with an interception. Tiki Barber added 127 yards on 24 carries with a touchdown, and Ron Dixon caught four passes for 107 yards.

==== Week 11: vs. Washington Redskins ====
Week 11: Washington Redskins at New York Giants – game summary

Quarter	1	2	3	4	Total
Redskins	0	10	7	0	**17**
**Giants**	3	7	6	3	**19**

at Giants Stadium, East Rutherford, New Jersey

- Date: November 17
- Game time: 1:00 p.m. EST
- Game weather: Overcast, 43 °F (6 °C)
- Game attendance: 78,727
- Referee: Tom White
- TV announcers (Fox): Kenny Albert, Tim Green, and John DiScepolo

Game information

**First quarter**

- NYG – Matt Bryant 43-yard field goal, 6:39. Giants 3–0. **Drive: 16 plays, 54 yards, 6:17.**

**Second quarter**

- WAS – Willie Jackson 6-yard pass from Shane Matthews (James Tuthill kick), 14:10. Redskins 7–3. **Drive: 10 plays, 71 yards, 4:14.**
- WAS – James Tuthill 31-yard field goal, 5:01. Redskins 10–3. **Drive: 4 plays, −1 yards, 0:50.**
- NYG – Amani Toomer 35-yard pass from Kerry Collins (Matt Bryant kick), 1:47. Tied 10–10. **Drive: 9 plays, 72 yards, 3:14.**

**Third quarter**

- WAS – Rod Gardner 11-yard pass from Shane Matthews (James Tuthill kick), 11:53. Redskins 17–10. **Drive: 1 play, 11 yards, 0:08.**
- NYG – Matt Bryant 34-yard field goal, 2:56. Redskins 17–13. **Drive: 8 plays, 15 yards, 2:16.**
- NYG – Matt Bryant 33-yard field goal, 1:32. Redskins 17–16. **Drive: 5 plays, 22 yards, 1:17.**

**Fourth quarter**

- NYG – Matt Bryant 19-yard field goal, 11:56. Giants 19–17. **Drive: 9 plays, 39 yards, 4:11.**

**Top passers**

- WAS – Shane Matthews – 15/35, 113 yards, 2 TD, INT
- NYG – Kerry Collins – 22/46, 211 yards, TD, 2 INT

**Top rushers**

- WAS – Stephen Davis – 19 rushes, 59 yards
- NYG – Tiki Barber – 24 rushes, 64 yards

**Top receivers**

- WAS – Rod Gardner – 5 receptions, 47 yards
- NYG – Jeremy Shockey – 11 receptions, 111 yards

==== Week 12: at Houston Texans ====
Week 12: New York Giants at Houston Texans – game summary

Quarter	1	2	3	4	Total
Giants	0	7	0	7	**14**
**Texans**	0	5	8	3	**16**

at Reliant Stadium, Houston, Texas

- Date: November 24
- Game time: 4:15 p.m. EST/3:15 p.m. CST
- Game weather: Mostly cloudy, 74 °F (23 °C)
- Game attendance: 70,054
- Referee: Terry McAulay
- TV announcers (Fox): Sam Rosen, Bill Maas and Matt Sampsell

Game information

**First quarter**

- No scoring plays.

**Second quarter**

- HOU – Kris Brown 40-yard field goal, 12:29. Texans 3–0. **Drive: 9 plays, 53 yards, 5:49.**
- NYG – Tiki Barber 2-yard run (Matt Bryant kick), 3:40. Giants 7–3. **Drive: 5 plays, 86 yards, 2:27.**
- HOU – Bob Jones fumble out of bounds in end zone for a safety, 0:19. Giants 7–5.

**Third quarter**

- HOU – Jonathan Wells 1-yard run (David Carr–James Allen pass), 6:41. Texans 13–7. **Drive: 7 plays, 34 yards, 3:51.**

**Fourth quarter**

- NYG – Amani Toomer 31-yard pass from Kerry Collins (Matt Bryant kick), 13:10. Giants 14–13. **Drive: 6 plays, 61 yards, 2:15.**
- HOU – Kris Brown 50-yard field goal, 6:57. Texans 16–14. **Drive: 11 plays, 41 yards, 6:13.**

**Top passers**

- NYG – Kerry Collins – 18/41, 214 yards, TD, 2 INT
- HOU – David Carr – 10/23, 103 yards

**Top rushers**

- NYG – Tiki Barber – 20 rushes, 147 yards, TD
- HOU – Jonathan Wells – 24 rushes, 68 yards, TD

**Top receivers**

- NYG – Amani Toomer – 8 receptions, 113 yards, TD
- HOU – Billy Miller – 4 receptions, 70 yards

==== Week 13: vs. Tennessee Titans ====
Week 13: Tennessee Titans at New York Giants – game summary

Quarter	1	2	3	4	OT	Total
**Titans**	0	14	0	15	3	**32**
Giants	3	7	10	9	0	**29**

at Giants Stadium, East Rutherford, New Jersey

- Date: December 1
- Game time: 1:00 p.m. EST
- Game weather: Mostly cloudy, 36 °F (2 °C)
- Game attendance: 78,640
- Referee: Jeff Triplette
- TV announcers (CBS): Kevin Harlan, Randy Cross and Beasley Reece

Game information

**First quarter**

- NYG – Matt Bryant 38-yard field goal, 11:07. Giants 3–0. **Drive: 7 plays, 17 yards, 2:20.**

**Second quarter**

- TEN – Derrick Mason 6-yard pass from Steve McNair (Joe Nedney kick), 12:02. Titans 7–3. **Drive: 18 plays, 86 yards, 9:29.**
- NYG – Dan Campbell 1-yard pass from Kerry Collins (Matt Bryant kick), 1:14. Giants 10–7. **Drive: 10 plays, 55 yards, 4:52.**
- TEN – Drew Bennett 26-yard pass from Steve McNair (Joe Nedney kick), 0:23. Titans 14–10. **Drive: 4 plays, 63 yards, 0:51.**

**Third quarter**

- NYG – Ron Dixon 24-yard pass from Kerry Collins (Matt Bryant kick), 14:03. Giants 17–14. **Drive: 3 plays, 62 yards, 0:57.**
- NYG – Matt Bryant 36-yard field goal, 8:44. Giants 20–14. **Drive: 7 plays, 40 yards, 3:00.**

**Fourth quarter**

- NYG – Tiki Barber 1-yard run (pass failed), 14:15. Giants 26–14. **Drive: 9 plays, 88 yards, 4:47.**
- TEN – Eddie George 1-yard run (Joe Nedney kick), 7:34. Giants 26–21. **Drive: 14 plays, 72 yards, 6:41.**
- NYG – Matt Bryant 19-yard field goal, 2:21. Giants 29–21. **Drive: 12 plays, 78 yards, 5:13.**
- TEN – Frank Wycheck 9-yard pass from Steve McNair (McNair run), 0:09. Tied 29–29. **Drive: 12 plays, 81 yards, 2:12.**

**Overtime**

- TEN – Joe Nedney 38-yard field goal, 10:00. Titans 32–29. **Drive: 7 plays, 60 yards, 2:48.**

**Top passers**

- TEN – Steve McNair – 30/43, 334 yards, 3 TD
- NYG – Kerry Collins – 22/36, 283 yards, 2 TD

**Top rushers**

- TEN – Eddie George – 20 rushes, 64 yards, TD
- NYG – Tiki Barber – 22 rushes, 64 yards, TD

**Top receivers**

- TEN – Derrick Mason – 12 receptions, 116 yards, TD
- NYG – Amani Toomer – 5 receptions, 104 yards

==== Week 14: at Washington Redskins ====
Week 14: New York Giants at Washington Redskins – game summary

Quarter	1	2	3	4	Total
**Giants**	3	14	7	3	**27**
Redskins	0	3	11	7	**21**

at FedEx Field, Landover, Maryland

- Date: December 8
- Game time: 1:00 p.m. EST
- Game weather: Mostly cloudy, 45 °F (7 °C)
- Game attendance: 78,635
- Referee: Ed Hochuli
- TV announcers (Fox): Dick Stockton, Daryl Johnston and Dave Feldman

Game information

**First quarter**

- NYG – Matt Bryant 42-yard field goal, 2:10. Giants 3–0. **Drive: 10 plays, 43 yards, 3:53.**

**Second quarter**

- NYG – Charles Stackhouse 2-yard pass from Kerry Collins (Matt Bryant kick), 8:47. Giants 10–0. **Drive: 9 plays, 56 yards, 5:10.**
- NYG – Amani Toomer 29-yard pass from Kerry Collins (Matt Bryant kick), 1:53. Giants 17–0. **Drive: 2 plays, 34 yards, 0:34.**
- WAS – José Cortez 24-yard field goal, 0:00. Giants 17–3. **Drive: 7 plays, 59 yards, 1:53.**

**Third quarter**

- WAS – José Cortez 44-yard field goal, 5:52. Giants 17–6. **Drive: 7 plays, 18 yards, 3:29.**
- WAS – Rod Gardner 13-yard pass from Patrick Ramsey (Patrick Ramsey–Chris Doering pass), 3:17. Giants 17–14. **Drive: 5 plays, 55 yards, 1:13.**
- NYG – Tiki Barber 1-yard run (Matt Bryant kick), 1:25. Giants 24–14. **Drive: 2 plays, 21 yards, 0:44.**

**Fourth quarter**

- NYG – Matt Bryant 35-yard field goal, 10:57. Giants 27–14. **Drive: 9 plays, 74 yards, 4:07.**
- WAS – Stephen Davis 1-yard run (José Cortez kick), 8:42. Giants 27–21. **Drive: 7 plays, 62 yards, 2:15.**

**Top passers**

- NYG – Kerry Collins – 17/31, 212 yards, 2 TD
- WAS – Patrick Ramsey – 12/27, 204 yards, TD

**Top rushers**

- NYG – Tiki Barber – 20 rushes, 96 yards, TD
- WAS – Stephen Davis – 12 rushes, 70 yards, TD

**Top receivers**

- NYG – Jeremy Shockey – 5 receptions, 89 yards
- WAS – Derrius Thompson – 6 receptions, 122 yards

Coming off two straight devastating losses, the 6–6 Giants were now two games behind the Saints for the NFC's second wild card playoff spot. To make matters worse, on the road against the 5–7 Redskins, they would be without five injured defensive players that opened the season as starters; however, many of their backups ended up playing pivotal roles.

Washington was first to threaten on their second drive behind the arm of Danny Wuerffel, but José Cortez missed a 36-yard field goal. A 20-yard pass from Kerry Collins to Jeremy Shockey led to Matt Bryant converting a 42-yard kick for a 3–0 Giants lead.

The Redskins reached New York's 22-yard line early in the second quarter; but following a 9-yard catch, Derrius Thompson had the ball stripped by Omar Stoutmire and recovered and returned 31 yards by Ralph Brown, a cornerback making his second career start. A 43-yard run by Tiki Barber and a third-down pass interference penalty on Antonio Pierce led to a touchdown reception by Charles Stackhouse.

On the ensuing drive, Wuerffel fumbled on a sack, with rookie Nick Greisen—making his first career start—coming up with the force and recovery. A missed 37-yard kick by Bryant spoiled the opportunity, but Wuerffel was intercepted by Brown three plays later. Shortly after, Collins found Amani Toomer for a 29-yard touchdown and a 17–0 Giants lead with two minutes left in the first half. However, Wuerffel scrambled 26 yards to put Washington in field goal range, and Cortez's 24-yard field goal was good as time expired.

In the third quarter, a 28-yard catch by Thompson put the Redskins in the red zone, but a taunting penalty on Darnerien McCants pushed them back 15 yards, and sacks by Brandon Short and Kevin Lewis—the latter also making his first start—forced them to punt. Soon after, Wuerffel fumbled on a sack by Cornelius Griffin; Stephen Davis recovered for Washington, but Wuerffel was out the rest of the game with a sprained right shoulder in favor of rookie Patrick Ramsey, who led Washington to a 44-yard Cortez field goal.

After New York went three-and-out, a 33-yard run by Davis led to Ramsey finding Rod Gardner for a 13-yard touchdown, and the two-point conversion by Chris Doering cut the Giants' lead to 17–14 late in the period. Washington's defense then forced another punt; but the fair catch was muffed by Champ Bailey and recovered by Kato Serwanga. Two plays later, Barber scored from the 1; then on their next drive, Collins completed a 30-yard pass to Shockey and a 32-yard strike to rookie Daryl Jones, which led to a 35-yard Bryant field goal to extend New York's lead to 27–14.

Ramsey quickly led the Redskins 62 yards in seven plays, converting on a fourth-down pass to Gardner before Davis scored a touchdown to make the score 27–21; they regained possession on their 30-yard line with seven minutes remaining. A 17-yard pass to Thompson and a 24-yard catch-and-run by rookie Ladell Betts took Washington across midfield; but on 2nd-and-8, Thompson fumbled on a strip by Serwanga, who had been cut by the Redskins six days earlier and was now spelling injured nickelback Reggie Stephens, and Shaun Williams recovered. A last-ditch heave by Ramsey was knocked away in the end zone as time ran out, securing a much-needed Giants win.

Leading the effort by a much-maligned and battered defense, Griffin had a career-high three sacks, the team totaling six against the Washington quarterbacks. But thanks to the plays made by a group of reserves and castoffs, it was their five takeaways that proved the biggest factor in the harrowing victory.

==== Week 15: vs. Dallas Cowboys ====
Week 15: Dallas Cowboys at New York Giants – game summary

Quarter	1	2	3	4	Total
Cowboys	0	0	0	7	**7**
**Giants**	21	3	3	10	**37**

at Giants Stadium, East Rutherford, New Jersey

- Date: December 15
- Game time: 4:15 p.m. EST
- Game weather: Mostly cloudy, 45 °F (7 °C)
- Game attendance: 78,698
- Referee: Walt Coleman
- TV announcers (Fox): Pat Summerall, Brian Baldinger and John DiScepolo

Game information

**First quarter**

- NYG – Tiki Barber 1-yard run (Matt Bryant kick), 8:36. Giants 7–0. **Drive: 11 plays, 63 yards, 4:48.**
- NYG – Kenny Holmes 50-yard fumble return (Matt Bryant kick), 5:36. Giants 14–0.
- NYG – Ron Dayne 4-yard run (Matt Bryant kick), 1:34. Giants 21–0. **Drive: 5 plays, 80 yards, 2:32.**

**Second quarter**

- NYG – Matt Bryant 38-yard field goal, 12:37. Giants 24–0. **Drive: 5 plays, 40 yards, 2:12.**

**Third quarter**

- NYG – Matt Bryant 35-yard field goal, 12:44. Giants 27–0. **Drive: 6 plays, 50 yards, 2:16.**

**Fourth quarter**

- NYG – Matt Bryant 31-yard field goal, 14:46. Giants 30–0. **Drive: 4 plays, 3 yards, 0:49.**
- NYG – Ron Dayne 3-yard run (Matt Bryant kick), 5:58. Giants 37–0. **Drive: 11 plays, 54 yards, 7:04.**
- DAL – Antonio Bryant 9-yard pass from Chad Hutchinson (Billy Cundiff kick), 1:56. Giants 37–7. **Drive: 8 plays, 56 yards, 4:02.**

**Top passers**

- DAL – Chad Hutchinson – 16/40, 161 yards, TD, 2 INT
- NYG – Kerry Collins – 13/27, 190 yards

**Top rushers**

- DAL – Troy Hambrick – 10 rushes, 42 yards
- NYG – Tiki Barber – 11 rushes, 81 yards, TD

**Top receivers**

- DAL – Michael Wiley – 4 receptions, 31 yards
- NYG – Amani Toomer – 6 receptions, 99 yards

==== Week 16: at Indianapolis Colts ====
Week 16: New York Giants at Indianapolis Colts – game summary

Quarter	1	2	3	4	Total
**Giants**	3	7	20	14	**44**
Colts	0	3	3	21	**27**

at RCA Dome, Indianapolis, Indiana

- Date: December 22
- Game time: 1:00 p.m. EST
- Game weather: None (indoor stadium)
- Game attendance: 56,579
- Referee: Dick Hantak
- TV announcers (Fox): Joe Buck, Troy Aikman, Cris Collinsworth and Pam Oliver

Game information

**First quarter**

- NYG – Matt Bryant 20-yard field goal, 9:24. Giants 3–0. **Drive: 5 plays, 23 yards, 2:45.**

**Second quarter**

- NYG – Tiki Barber 4-yard run (Morten Andersen kick), 12:42. Giants 10–0. **Drive: 9 plays, 63 yards, 4:23.**
- IND – Mike Vanderjagt 20-yard field goal, 0:05. Giants 10–3. **Drive: 4 plays, 4 yards, 1:13.**

**Third quarter**

- NYG – Amani Toomer 82-yard pass from Kerry Collins (Matt Bryant kick), 14:41. Giants 17–3. **Drive: 1 play, 82 yards, 0:19.**
- NYG – Charles Stackhouse 18-yard pass from Kerry Collins (kick failed), 10:23. Giants 23–3. **Drive: 5 plays, 47 yards, 1:54.**
- IND – Mike Vanderjagt 27-yard field goal, 5:18. Giants 23–6. **Drive: 14 plays, 49 yards, 5:05.**
- NYG – Tiki Barber 1-yard run (Morten Andersen kick), 0:11. Giants 30–6. **Drive: 10 plays, 69 yards, 5:07.**

**Fourth quarter**

- IND – Reggie Wayne 21-yard pass from Peyton Manning (run failed), 13:34. Giants 30–12. **Drive: 5 plays, 62 yards, 1:37.**
- NYG – Amani Toomer 21-yard pass from Kerry Collins (Matt Bryant kick), 6:45. Giants 37–12. **Drive: 10 plays, 58 yards, 6:49.**
- IND – Marvin Harrison 25-yard pass from Peyton Manning (Peyton Manning–Marcus Pollard pass), 4:51. Giants 37–20. **Drive: 6 plays, 77 yards, 1:54.**
- IND – Reggie Wayne 40-yard pass from Peyton Manning (Mike Vanderjagt kick), 4:44. Giants 37–27. **Drive: 1 play, 40 yards, 0:07.**
- NYG – Amani Toomer 27-yard pass from Kerry Collins (Matt Bryant kick), 4:00. Giants 44–27. **Drive: 4 plays, 42 yards, 0:44.**

**Top passers**

- NYG – Kerry Collins – 23/29, 366 yards, 4 TD
- IND – Peyton Manning – 30/46, 365 yards, 3 TD, 2 INT

**Top rushers**

- NYG – Tiki Barber – 18 rushes, 60 yards, 2 TD
- IND – James Mungro – 8 rushes, 21 yards

**Top receivers**

- NYG – Amani Toomer – 10 receptions, 204 yards, 3 TD
- IND – Marvin Harrison – 10 receptions, 128 yards, TD

After two games against teams with losing records, the Giants' schedule got tougher with a road game at Indianapolis. However, the Giants would be up to the challenge in a shootout.

The Giants took a 3–0 lead in the first quarter with a 20-yard Matt Bryant field goal. The first play of the second quarter was when this game took off. Kerry Collins threw a screen pass to Jeremy Shockey, who ran over and flattened Colts safety David Gibson before finally being brought down at the Colts' 14-yard line after a 24-yard gain. Shockey's takedown of Gibson was all the more embarrassing for the Colt as he declared before the game that Shockey was "just another player." Three plays later, Tiki Barber ran in for a 4-yard touchdown. The score was 10–3 Giants at the half, but some noted that the Giants should have been up by more as two lost fumbles hindered their offense.

On the first play of the second half came the play of the game. The Giants ran a flea flicker where Tiki Barber took a handoff before throwing the ball back to Kerry Collins, who then launched a rocket (starting from his own 5-yard line, Collins' pass landed inside the Colts' 40) to Amani Toomer, who outran the already embarrassed David Gibson for an 82-yard touchdown. On the next Giants drive, they extended their lead with Collins finding Charles Stackhouse for an 18-yard touchdown to make the score 24–3. With 11 seconds to go in the third quarter, Tiki Barber ran in for a 1-yard touchdown. The score was 30–6 Giants heading into the fourth quarter.

With 13:34 to go in the fourth quarter, the Colts finally got into the end zone with Peyton Manning finding Reggie Wayne for a 21-yard touchdown to make it 31–12 Giants. The Giants answered with Kerry Collins finding Amani Toomer for a 21-yard touchdown to make the score 37–12. However, after this touchdown the Giants defense and special teams began to blow their seemingly insurmountable lead. The Colts needed just six plays to drive 77 yards for a touchdown, with Manning finding Marvin Harrison for a 25-yard touchdown. The ensuing two-point conversion made the score 37–20 with 4:51 to go. The Colts needed an onside kick, and Colts kicker Mike Vanderjagt lofted a kick up and over the Giants frontlines with the Colts recovering the ball. On the very next play, Manning found Reggie Wayne for another Colts touchdown. Suddenly with 4:44 to go, the Giants led by just 10, 37–27. However the Giants recovered the ensuing onside kick before facing a 3rd and 11. Rather than play it safe and run the ball to kill the clock, Jim Fassel called for another pass play. The gamble paid off with Collins hitting Toomer for his third touchdown of the day, a 27-yard touchdown that finally put the game away with 4:00 to go.

Kerry Collins achieved a perfect passer rating of 158.3, going 23 of 29 for 366 yards and four touchdowns with no interceptions. Amani Toomer caught 10 passes for 204 yards and a career-high three touchdowns, with Jeremy Shockey adding 7 receptions for 116 yards. Kenny Holmes registered two sacks for the Giants defense.

Not only did the Giants remain in playoff contention with their win over the Colts, but they gained help from an unlikely source. While this game was taking place, the lowly 1–13 Cincinnati Bengals came from behind and stunned the New Orleans Saints. As a result of this game, the Giants were now ahead of the Saints in playoff standings.

==== Week 17: vs. Philadelphia Eagles ====
Week 17: Philadelphia Eagles at New York Giants – game summary

Quarter	1	2	3	4	OT	Total
Eagles	7	0	0	0	0	**7**
**Giants**	0	0	0	7	3	**10**

at Giants Stadium, East Rutherford, New Jersey

- Date: December 28
- Game time: 1:30 p.m. EST
- Game weather: Partly sunny, 36 °F (2 °C)
- Game attendance: 78,782
- Referee: Ron Blum
- TV announcers (Fox): Joe Buck, Troy Aikman, Cris Collinsworth and Pam Oliver

Game information

**First quarter**

- PHI – James Thrash 20-yard run (David Akers kick), 12:36. Eagles 7–0. **Drive: 4 plays, 67 yards, 2:24.**

**Second quarter**

- No scoring plays.

**Third quarter**

- No scoring plays.

**Fourth quarter**

- NYG – Jeremy Shockey 7-yard pass from Kerry Collins (Matt Bryant kick), 8:08. Tied 7–7. **Drive: 13 plays, 80 yards, 6:59.**

**Overtime**

- NYG – Matt Bryant 39-yard field goal, 9:50. Giants 10–7. **Drive: 7 plays, 41 yards, 3:46.**

**Top passers**

- PHI – A. J. Feeley – 13/25, 150 yards, INT
- NYG – Kerry Collins – 25/35, 256 yards, TD, INT

**Top rushers**

- PHI – Duce Staley – 17 rushes, 28 yards
- NYG – Tiki Barber – 32 rushes, 203 yards

**Top receivers**

- PHI – Duce Staley – 3 receptions, 39 yards
- NYG – Jeremy Shockey – 10 receptions, 98 yards, TD

Three straight wins had put the Giants in control of their playoff destiny; a Saturday afternoon win over the Eagles would clinch a playoff spot, otherwise they'd need the Saints to lose to the Panthers the next day. Philadelphia, meanwhile, had won six straight games despite the absence of injured Pro Bowl quarterback Donovan McNabb and backup Koy Detmer. Third-stringer A. J. Feeley had been solid in their absences, and a win would give the Eagles home-field advantage throughout the playoffs.

Philadelphia received the opening kickoff and immediately drove 67 yards in four plays; a 20-yard completion to Jeff Thomason, a 35-yard catch-and-run by Duce Staley, and a 20-yard run for a touchdown on a double reverse by James Thrash gave them a 7–0 lead, the only first-quarter touchdown the Giants had allowed all season. New York responded with a quick march into the red zone with a mixture of Jeremy Shockey and Tiki Barber, but on 2nd-and-Goal from the 6-yard line, Kerry Collins forced a pass into double coverage and was intercepted by Michael Lewis to kill the possession.

Neither team threatened to score in a sloppy first half of muffed snaps and grass field slips until the Giants took over at their own 29; Collins completed passes for first downs to Barber and Amani Toomer before a 24-yard strike to Shockey put the ball back on the Eagles' 6. Two plays later, Collins found Charles Stackhouse for a touchdown, but a questionable holding penalty on Mike Rosenthal nullified the score, and shortly after, Barber slipped and had the ball poked out after taking a handoff, and the Eagles recovered, maintaining their shutout at halftime.

Barber lost his second fumble on the opening possession of the second half; but the Eagles missed their chance to capitalize when an offensive pass interference on Antonio Freeman wiped out a third-down conversion by Thrash that would've put them in the red zone, and Barber was quickly racking up the rushing yards for the Giants, scampering for a 39-yard run down the left sideline in the late minutes of the third quarter. But after rookie Daryl Jones mistimed his jump on what would've been a touchdown catch, the drive stalled, and Matt Bryant's 36-yard field goal drifted wide right to keep New York scoreless despite mostly controlling the pace of the game.

Early in the fourth quarter, still trailing 7–0, Jim Fassel got tricky by calling a reverse pass from Shockey to Toomer; the pass was incomplete, and Rosenthal was flagged for clipping on Brandon Whiting, putting the Giants at 1st-and-25. Collins threw over the middle to an airborne Shockey, who was decked by Lewis as he somehow held on for the catch and 20-yard gain before standing and firing up the Giants Stadium crowd. Three plays later, they were at Philadelphia's 43-yard line, where Collins launched a deep bomb to Toomer for a touchdown; once again, however, the score was erased by a questionable penalty, this time Rich Seubert being called for holding.

Undaunted, Collins passed and handed the ball to Barber on three straight plays, and he picked up 36 yards to put the ball inside the 10. On 2nd-and-Goal from the 7, Collins then threw a jump ball to Shockey, who outfought Brian Dawkins in the end zone for a touchdown. In their two games against the Eagles, the Giants had six drives reach the red zone and only had a field goal to show for it, before finally breaking through; Bryant's extra point hit the right upright but deflected in to tie the game at 7 to cap a 13-play, 80-yard drive.

On the ensuing series, Feeley picked up 17 yards on a pass to Thomason to put the Eagles in New York territory; but the Giants' defense held up again, giving the ball back to the offense with 5:17 remaining. However, on the second play of the drive, Barber lost his third fumble when he had it knocked loose by Dawkins, giving Philadelphia the ball on the 26-yard line.

With only one time-out left, the Giants used it as Feeley handed off to Staley six straight times before Pro Bowler David Akers came on for a 35-yard field goal attempt; he had been 30-of-33 on the season, but his kick missed wide right, igniting the crowd and giving the Giants new life with 1:12 to go. New York picked up a first down in the final minute of regulation but eventually took a knee, sending the game to overtime.

Bryant's kickoff was returned 32 yards by Brian Mitchell to set the Eagles up at the 45-yard line. A one-handed sack of Feeley by Kenny Holmes and an 11-yard catch by Freddie Mitchell set up 3rd-and-5; Feeley's pass for Chad Lewis was tipped and intercepted by Shaun Williams, with Brandon Short getting away with a possible uncalled hold.

Despite the fumbles, the Giants kept feeding Barber, and they were granted an additional 15 yards when Troy Vincent was called for unsportsmanlike conduct with a late shove against Jones. Three more carries by Barber—covering the ball up with both hands—picked up 21 yards and put New York at Philadelphia's 20. A heart-stopping moment took place when he muffed a handoff from Collins, but fell on the ball to save the possession; two plays later, Bryant came on and, despite a poor snap, converted the 39-yard field goal to put the Giants in the playoffs with a 10–7 win.

New York dominated in the battle of first downs (23–9) and total yards (461–209) but were often self sabotaged by untimely penalties and turnovers squandering scoring opportunities. However, Barber rushed for a career-best 203 yards and gained 281 total yards from scrimmage, while Shockey had 10 catches in a rookie season in which he broke Mark Bavaro's franchise record for most receptions in a season by a tight end with 74.

=== Standings ===
==== Division ====
NFC East
	W	L	T	PCT	DIV	CONF	PF	PA	STK
^{(1)} Philadelphia Eagles	12	4	0	.750	5–1	11–1	415	241	L1
^{(5)} New York Giants	10	6	0	.625	5–1	8–4	320	279	W4
Washington Redskins	7	9	0	.438	1–5	4–8	307	365	W2
Dallas Cowboys	5	11	0	.313	1–5	3–9	217	329	L4

==== Conference ====
NFC
#	Team	Division	W	L	T	PCT	DIV	CONF	SOS	SOV
**Division leaders**
1 (Note: Philadelphia finished ahead of Tampa Bay and Green Bay based on conference record (11–1 vs 9–3/9–3).)	Philadelphia Eagles	East	12	4	0	.750	5–1	11–1	.469	.432
2 (Note: Tampa Bay finished ahead of Green Bay based on head-to-head victory.)	Tampa Bay Buccaneers	South	12	4	0	.750	4–2	9–3	.482	.432
3	Green Bay Packers	North	12	4	0	.750	5–1	9–3	.451	.414
4	San Francisco 49ers	West	10	6	0	.625	5–1	8–4	.504	.450
**Wild Cards**
5	New York Giants	East	10	6	0	.625	5–1	8–4	.482	.450
6	Atlanta Falcons	South	9	6	1	.594	4–2	7–5	.494	.429
**Did not qualify for the postseason**
7	New Orleans Saints	South	9	7	0	.563	3–3	7–5	.498	.566
8 (Note: St. Louis finished ahead of Seattle based on division record (4–2 to 2–4).)	St. Louis Rams	West	7	9	0	.438	4–2	5–7	.508	.446
9	Seattle Seahawks	West	7	9	0	.438	2–4	5–7	.506	.433
10 (Note: Washington finished ahead of Carolina based on common games (2–3 to 1–4))	Washington Redskins	East	7	9	0	.438	1–5	4–8	.527	.438
11	Carolina Panthers	South	7	9	0	.438	1–5	4–8	.486	.357
12	Minnesota Vikings	North	6	10	0	.375	4–2	5–7	.498	.417
13 (Note: Arizona finished ahead of Dallas based on head-to-head victory.)	Arizona Cardinals	West	5	11	0	.313	1–5	5–7	.500	.400
14	Dallas Cowboys	East	5	11	0	.313	1–5	3–9	.500	.475
15	Chicago Bears	North	4	12	0	.250	2–4	3–9	.521	.430
16	Detroit Lions	North	3	13	0	.188	1–5	3–9	.494	.375
**Tiebreakers** (Note: When breaking ties for three or more teams under the NFL's rules, they are first broken within divisions, then comparing only the highest-ranked remaining team from each division.)

== Postseason ==
=== Prelude: Giants sign Trey Junkin ===
While the Giants made the postseason in 2002 after a one-year absence, throughout the season they had struggled on special teams, particularly with stability at the long snapper position. The Giants began the season with Bob Jones as their long snapper, but after he struggled in games against the Vikings and Texans, the Giants signed Dan O'Leary, who split time as the long snapper with center Chris Bober for the final five games of the regular season until he was put on Injured Reserve with torn thumb ligaments. With guard Jason Whittle also long snapping for a game, the Giants had used four separate long snappers on the season, along with three separate kick holders in punters Matt Allen and Tom Rouen, and backup quarterback Jesse Palmer. Before the Giants' Wild Card playoff game with the 49ers, Jim Fassel made the decision to sign Trey Junkin, who had played 19 seasons with Buffalo, Washington, the Raiders, Seattle, and Arizona, where Fassel had coached in 1996 before his tenure with the Giants. Junkin had been cut before the beginning of the season by the Cowboys and had retired before the Giants signed him. Of particular note was an NFL Films video featuring a segment on him and his job as a long snapper late in his career; he stated in the interview that he had made only "two bad snaps" in his career.

=== Schedule ===
Round	Date	Opponent	Result	Record	Venue	Recap
Wild Card	January 5	at San Francisco 49ers (4)	L 38–39	0–1	3Com Park	Recap

=== Game summary ===
==== NFC Wild Card Playoffs: at (4) San Francisco 49ers ====
NFC Wild Card Playoffs: (5) New York Giants at (4) Minnesota Vikings – Game summary

Quarter	1	2	3	4	Total
Giants	7	21	10	0	38
49ers	7	7	8	17	39

at 3Com Park, San Francisco, California

- Date: January 5
- Game time: 4:45 p.m. EST/1:45 p.m. PST
- Game weather: Scattered clouds, 54 °F (12 °C)
- Game attendance: 66,318
- Referee: Ron Winter
- TV announcers (Fox): Joe Buck, Cris Collinsworth, Troy Aikman and Pam Oliver

Game information

First quarter

- SF – Terrell Owens 76-yard pass from Jeff Garcia (Jeff Chandler kick), 9:59. 49ers 7–0. Drive: 1 plays, 76 yards, 0:11.
- NYG – Amani Toomer 12-yard pass from Kerry Collins (Matt Bryant kick), 0:18. Tied 7–7. Drive: 11 plays, 65 yards, 4:15.

Second quarter

- NYG – Jeremy Shockey 2-yard pass from Kerry Collins (Matt Bryant kick), 12:19. Giants 14–7. Drive: 5 plays, 61 yards, 2:24.
- SF – Kevan Barlow 1-yard run (Jeff Chandler kick), 6:05. Tied 14–14. Drive: 10 plays, 69 yards, 6:14.
- NYG – Amani Toomer 8-yard pass from Kerry Collins (Matt Bryant kick), 2:40. Giants 21–14. Drive: 1 play, 8 yards, 0:05.
- NYG – Amani Toomer 24-yard pass from Kerry Collins (Matt Bryant kick), 0:10. Giants 28–14. Drive: 5 plays, 56 yards, 1:43.

Third quarter

- NYG – Tiki Barber 6-yard run (Matt Bryant kick), 9:53. Giants 35–14. Drive: 6 plays, 54 yards, 2:16.
- NYG – Matt Bryant 21-yard field goal, 4:27. Giants 38–14. Drive: 9 plays, 63 yards, 4:20.
- SF – Terrell Owens 26-yard pass from Jeff Garcia (Garcia-Owens pass), 2:03. Giants 38–22. Drive: 7 plays, 70 yards, 2:24.

Fourth quarter

- SF – Jeff Garcia 14-yard run (Garcia-Owens pass), 14:55. Giants 38–30. Drive: 3 plays, 27 yards, 0:41.
- SF – Jeff Chandler 25-yard field goal, 7:49. Giants 38–33. Drive: 15 plays, 74 yards, 5:26.
- SF – Tai Streets 13-yard pass from Jeff Garcia (pass failed), 1:00. 49ers 39–38. Drive: 9 plays, 68 yards, 2:01.

Top passers

- NYG – Kerry Collins – 29/43, 342 yards, 4 TD, INT
- SF – Jeff Garcia – 27/44, 331 yards, 3 TD, INT

Top rushers

- NYG – Tiki Barber – 26 rushes, 115 yards, TD
- SF – Jeff Garcia – 7 rushes, 60 yards, TD

Top receivers

- NYG – Amani Toomer – 8 receptions, 136 yards, 3 TD
- SF – Terrell Owens – 9 receptions, 177 yards, 2 TD

The 2002 Giants season ended in one of the most humiliating losses in franchise history, featuring a blown 24-point lead and a catastrophic finish featuring both an epic special teams blunder and a controversial officiating call.

The game essentially unfolded in three phases: an evenly matched beginning, the Giants turning the game into a rout, and the 49ers' comeback.

The Giants won the toss and drove on their opening possession to the 49ers' 33-yard line, but Kerry Collins threw a pass that deflected off running back Ron Dayne's hands and was intercepted by 49ers linebacker Julian Peterson to end the drive. On the 49ers' first play from scrimmage, Jeff Garcia found Terrell Owens, who broke away from the Giants' secondary and took off for a 76-yard touchdown. The Giants got on the board with 18 seconds left in the quarter, with Collins finding Amani Toomer for a 12-yard touchdown to tie the score 7–7. The Giants scored another touchdown early in the second quarter with a 2-yard touchdown pass from Collins to Jeremy Shockey for their first lead of the game, 14–7. After a 25-yard pass from Owens to wide receiver Tai Streets on a gadget play, the 49ers tied the game up with 6:05 left to go in the first half, with running back Kevan Barlow scoring a rushing touchdown.

It was during the final minutes of the first half when the Giants began to build their big lead. A muffed punt by Cedrick Wilson led to Collins finding Toomer for an 8-yard touchdown with 2:49 to go in the first half. After a Garcia interception to Jason Sehorn, Collins found running back Tiki Barber for a 30-yard pass, and threw yet another touchdown to Toomer for his third touchdown reception of the game, and the Giants led 28–14 at the half. On the opening possession of the second half, the 49ers faced a 4th-and-1 when linebacker Dhani Jones stopped 49ers fullback Fred Beasley for no gain. The Giants scored again, with Barber running in for a 6-yard touchdown. On their next possession, the Giants advanced to the 49ers' 3-yard line for a goal-to-go situation. On 2nd-and-goal, Collins threw a pass directly to Shockey, but Shockey dropped the pass and the Giants were forced to settle for a 21-yard Matt Bryant field goal. The Giants were up 38–14 with 4:27 to go in the third quarter, but their momentum had been stopped with Shockey's dropped pass. This play is widely considered to be the turning point in the game.

Switching to a no-huddle tempo, the 49ers began their comeback with 2:10 to go in the third quarter, when Garcia found Owens for a 26-yard touchdown pass. A two-point conversion from Garcia to Owens made it 38–22 heading into the final quarter. After a terrible punt by Matt Allen and an unnecessary roughness penalty on Jones, the 49ers had great field position at the Giants' 27 to start their next drive, and they cashed in with Garcia running in for a 14-yard touchdown, followed by another two-point conversion from Garcia to Owens. Suddenly, with 14:55 to go in the game, the Giants were only leading 38–30. After another three-and-out by the Giants, the 49ers drove into the Giants' red zone again with a chance to tie the game, when the Giants finally held and the 49ers settled for Jeff Chandler's 25-yard field goal with 7:52 to go. The Giants finally got a drive going again, getting into field goal range with 3:06 to go when their special teams began to unravel. Long snapper Trey Junkin, signed only a few days before the game, sent a low snap into the dirt, resulting in Matt Bryant shanking the 42-yard field goal attempt wide left. The 49ers then drove 68 yards, with Garcia finding Streets for a 13-yard touchdown with 1:00 to go. The Giants were now losing a game they had been winning by 24 points, 39–38. As if blowing a seemingly insurmountable lead was not enough, the Giants were losing composure on the field as well, with safety Shaun Williams getting into a confrontation with Owens, resulting in offsetting unsportsmanlike conduct penalties following both the touchdown and the failed two-point conversion.

Although the Giants had blown their huge lead, they had one more chance to save their season. Kick returner Delvin Joyce returned the ensuing kickoff 32 yards to give the Giants good field position at their own 48-yard line. Collins found Ron Dixon for 10 yards, then after his next pass was nearly intercepted by cornerback Ahmed Plummer, he found Dixon for 19 yards. With 9 seconds left, the Giants ran a quick out to Toomer for 5 more yards, setting up a 41-yard field goal attempt on the last play of the game. What instead ensued was one of the worst plays in Giants history. Junkin launched a poor snap into the dirt, to the point that holder Allen could not get the ball down. Realizing that Bryant could not kick the field goal, Allen rolled out and threw a Hail Mary towards Rich Seubert, an offensive lineman who checked in as an eligible receiver for the play. As the ball neared, 49ers defensive end Chike Okeafor dragged down Seubert, which should have resulted in a pass interference against the 49ers and one more attempt for Bryant, since the game cannot end on a defensive penalty. However, the refs not only did not call pass interference on Okeafor, but instead called ineligible receiver downfield on Seubert, even though he in fact was an eligible receiver. As a result, the game was over.

The blown lead and ending ruined several outstanding individual performances by the Giants. Collins went 29 of 43 for 342 yards and 4 touchdowns with an interception, while Toomer caught 8 passes for 136 yards and 3 touchdowns and Barber added 177 yards from scrimmage with a touchdown. The most notable stat from the game, however, related to total yards: Both the Giants and the 49ers were dead even with 446 yards of total offense.

The day after the game, the NFL admitted that the penalty on the final play was incorrectly called. Their statement declared that although the Giants had ineligible receivers downfield, Seubert was eligible, and Okeafor should have been called for pass interference, meaning that offsetting penalties should have given the Giants one more chance to win the game. However, when a reporter revealed this to 49ers coach Steve Mariucci after the game, he simply replied, "Bummer," as there was no way the final outcome could be changed.

Junkin, the long snapper who botched the snap on the final play, promptly retired for good immediately after the game. He was deeply distraught about his role in the team's loss and solely blamed himself for the outcome, though many did note that he was hardly the only factor.

The 2002 Wild Card against the 49ers is among the most devastating losses in Giants history not only for its comeback and ending, but also because of the impact on the team. The following season, the Giants fell to 4–12 and tied for the worst record in the NFL. After the season, head coach Jim Fassel was fired and replaced with Tom Coughlin. Following their trade for rookie Eli Manning in the 2004 NFL draft, Collins was released, than signed with the Oakland Raiders, while many key defensive starters left. As a result, the Wild Card against the 49ers would retrospectively be seen by Giants fans as the beginning of the end of the Fassel era.
