= Ian Allen (gridiron football) =

American football player (born 1978)

No. 74, 76, 79
- Position: Offensive tackle

Personal information
- Born: July 22, 1978 (age 48); Newark, New Jersey, US
- Listed height: 6 ft 4 in (1.93 m)
- Listed weight: 310 lb (141 kg)

Career information
- High school: Westlake (Atlanta, Georgia)
- College: Purdue
- NFL draft: 2001: undrafted

Career history
- Kansas City Chiefs (2001)*; Atlanta Falcons (2001)*; Scottish Claymores (2002); Kansas City Chiefs (2002)*; New York Giants (2002–2003); Philadelphia Eagles (2004); Arizona Cardinals (2005); Kansas City Chiefs (2006)*; Montreal Alouettes (2006)
- * Offseason or practice squad member only

Career NFL statistics
- Games played: 25
- Games started: 11
- Stats at Pro Football Reference

Career CFL statistics
- Games played: 6

Ian Ramon Allen (born July 22, 1978) is an American former professional football player. An offensive tackle, he played in the National Football League (NFL) for the New York Giants, the Philadelphia Eagles, the Arizona Cardinals, the Atlanta Falcons, and the Kansas City Chiefs. He also played in NFL Europe with the Scottish Claymores and in the Canadian Football League (CFL) with the Montreal Alouettes. He attended college at Purdue University, where he earned a communications degree and played for the Purdue Boilermakers.

After his professional football career ended, Allen started careers in music, broadcasting, and business. He started Nova 53 Records, a recording company, under which he released the album "Nova's Lounge". He appeared as a game-day football analyst on several television stations. After earning a Master of Business Administration (MBA) degree, Allen worked for a variety of companies in business roles.

== Early career ==
Allen played high school football at Westlake High School in Atlanta, Georgia, as both an offensive and defensive tackles. As a junior in 1994, Allen was selected to the All-South Fulton team for his role as the "best blocker" on the offensive line of Westlake. He earned an honorable mention for the All-State team as a defensive lineman the following year. Allen was recruited by Georgia and Georgia Tech, but he declined both offers in favor of "play[ing] for an underdog". After offering a verbal commitment to play for the Vanderbilt Commodores as a defensive tackle, Allen instead signed with Purdue, where he played as a right guard. Playing under head coach Joe Tiller and blocking for quarterback Drew Brees, Allen was a member of the 2000 team that won a Big Ten Conference championship and competed in the Rose Bowl against the Washington Huskies. He played in 47 games for the Boilermakers, including four starts.

== Professional career ==
=== Kansas City Chiefs ===
Allen was eligible for the 2001 NFL draft but went undrafted. He was later signed as a free agent to the Kansas City Chiefs, who released him prior to the start of the 2001 regular season. After being waived by the Chiefs, Allen intended to leave football behind, but he accepted a spot on the practice squad of the Atlanta Falcons in January 2002. Later that month, the Chiefs signed Allen to a three-year contract. During the offseason, Allen was sent to play for the Scottish Claymores of NFL Europe to gain experience. After his father had a stroke, Allen was forced to leave the Claymores and return to the United States. He participated in training camp and the preseason with the Chiefs but was waived shortly before the start of the regular season.

=== New York Giants ===
Shortly after Allen was released by the Chiefs, the New York Giants signed Allen to their practice squad. The Giants signed Allen to the active roster in early October 2002 following a series of injuries to their offensive linemen. Allen was active as a backup offensive lineman for the remainder of the regular season, but he never played a down on the offensive line. In a mid-October game against the Atlanta Falcons, Allen was forced into action as a defensive lineman on goal-line plays when multiple starting linemen were injured. Speaking about the situation, defensive line coach Denny Marcin stated "I told Ian, 'You line up on the right side and go straight ahead.' I just needed a body." Allen was active for the Giants' loss to the San Francisco 49ers in the wild card playoff round.

Before the 2003 season, both Jason Whittle and Mike Rosenthal left the Giants via free agency, leaving two starting positions open on the offensive line. By the start of the Giants' pre-season minicamp, Allen was considered the favorite to start at right tackle, but he remained in competition with four other players for the two starting roles. The newly constructed right side of the offensive line played poorly in the first preseason game against the New England Patriots, but Allen showed enough improvement the following week against the Carolina Panthers to be named the starter going into the regular season.

Both head coach Jim Fassel and offensive line coach Jim McNally were critical of Allen's play in the season opener, where a missed block led to a forced fumble from quarterback Kerry Collins. Center Chris Bober started in place of Allen at right tackle the following week. Following a season-ending injury to left guard Rich Seubert, Bober was moved back to center and Allen returned as the starting right tackle. In his second stint as a starter, Allen's performance was praised by coaches and the media, including after a game against the New York Jets which saw NFL sack leader Shaun Ellis held to half a sack. The Giants ended their season with a 4–12 record and did not make the playoffs. Allen started in 11 games at right tackle in 2003.

Allen played as the starter at right tackle in each of the Giants' three minicamps prior to the 2004 preseason, but incoming head coach Tom Coughlin moved right guard David Diehl to the right tackle position before the first preseason game. Allen was originally designated the primary backup at left and right tackle going into the 2004 season, but he was released after the Giants signed Marques Sullivan off waivers.

=== Late career ===
In the week after being released by the New York Giants, Allen was signed by the Philadelphia Eagles for the 2004 season. He acted as a backup throughout the season, playing in only four games. The Eagles lost to the New England Patriots 21–24 in Super Bowl XXXIX, where Allen was among the inactive players.

In April 2005, Allen was signed by the Arizona Cardinals. He participated in training camp and remained on the team through the preseason. Allen was released in early September before the beginning of the regular season but later returned to the team. The Cardinals placed Allen on injured reserve in mid-October.

Allen signed with the Kansas City Chiefs for the third time in 2006, but he again didn't make their final roster. Allen was signed to the developmental roster of the Montreal Alouettes of the Canadian Football League in July 2006, and he played six games with them that season. Following his debut game, Allen was fined $300 due to an incident that involved BC Lions linebacker Carl Kidd punching Allen twice in the face. In May 2007, Allen announced his retirement to pursue his music career.

== Music career ==
As a freshman in high school, Allen played the tenor saxophone in the marching band before joining the football team. He also plays the drums and keyboard. He continued to pursue music on the side throughout his football career, maintaining a "mini-studio" in his home even while starting at right tackle for the New York Giants. After being cut by the Kansas City Chiefs for the final time, Allen contacted Alouettes head coach and general manager Jim Popp about playing for the Alouettes due to the presence of a large music scene in Montreal. During his year with the Alouettes, Allen worked on a jazz album titled "Nova's Lounge" with his company Nova 53 Records. The album was released on November 24, 2006, in Canada, with Allen credited as producer and composer. Allen retired before the 2007 CFL season to pursue his music career.

== Post-retirement ==
=== Broadcasting ===
Allen worked for the NFL Network, Sky Sports NFL, and the Big Ten Network as a game-day analyst in the years following his retirement from football. He also co-hosted the radio broadcast Inside the Trenches with former NFL defensive linemen R-Kal Truluck and Lance Legree. Inside the Trenches aimed to provide the perspective of offensive and defensive linemen while discussing professional football.

=== Ipswich Cardinals ===
In March 2008, Allen completed a deal to co-own the Ipswich Cardinals of the BAFA National Leagues in the United Kingdom. Allen did not invest money in the club to receive an ownership stake, but he became involved in promotion and advertising.

=== Business career ===
Allen attended an entrepreneurship program at Northwestern University which prompted him to continue his schooling at the Krannert School of Management at Purdue. He enrolled in an MBA program and graduated in 2012. He later worked for General Motors and Xerox. As of February 2017, Allen works for Target in Minneapolis.
