= Brandon Short =

American football player (born 1977)

No. 53, 54
- Position: Linebacker

Personal information
- Born: July 11, 1977 (age 49); McKeesport, Pennsylvania, U.S.
- Listed height: 6 ft 3 in (1.91 m)
- Listed weight: 245 lb (111 kg)

Career information
- High school: McKeesport Area
- College: Penn State
- NFL draft: 2000: 4th round, 105th overall pick

Career history
- New York Giants (2000–2003); Carolina Panthers (2004–2005); New York Giants (2006)

Awards and highlights
- Consensus All-American (1999); 2× First-team All-Big Ten (1998, 1999); Citrus Bowl Most Valuable Player (1998)

Career NFL statistics
- Total tackles: 384
- Sacks: 9.5
- Forced fumbles: 5
- Fumble recoveries: 4
- Interceptions: 2
- Stats at Pro Football Reference

Brandon Darrell Short (born July 11, 1977) is an American former professional football player who was a linebacker for seven seasons in the National Football League (NFL). He played college football for the Penn State Nittany Lions, earning consensus All-American honors in 1999. He played professionally for the New York Giants and Carolina Panthers of the NFL, and was a member the Giants' team that played in Super Bowl XXXV. He is currently Director of Mergers and Acquisitions at Round Hill Capital in London and a member of the Pennsylvania State University's board of trustees.

== Early life ==
Short was born in McKeesport, Pennsylvania. He attended McKeesport Area High School, where he played high school football for the McKeesport Tigers. He was named Associated Press Pennsylvania Big School Player-of-the-Year as a senior after compiling 171 tackles, eight sacks, two interceptions, five forced fumbles, six fumble recoveries and one blocked punt and leading the Tigers to the Class AAAA state championship and a 15–0 record. He lettered four times in both football and basketball. He was named to the USA Today list of Top 25 high school players in the country, a high school All-American and was the 1995 Big 33 Most Valuable Player. A superb basketball player as well, Short was a member of a McKeesport team that attained the No. 1 state ranking his senior year.

== College career ==
Short attended Penn State University, where he was a four-year starter and two-time captain for coach Joe Paterno's Penn State Nittany Lions football team. He was named defensive MVP of the 1998 Citrus Bowl, and All-Big Ten as a senior and junior.

Short earned All-American honors as a senior in 1999. He and teammate LaVar Arrington were the first teammates to be chosen as finalists for the Butkus Award as the nation's top linebacker. Together they made up one of the most fearsome linebacker duos ever to play at "Linebacker U", capping their senior season with a 24-0 shutout of Texas A&M in the 1999 Alamo Bowl. Short led the team with 103 tackles and four sacks that season.

=== Freshman season ===
Short played on five snaps as a true freshman in Penn State's first game with Texas Tech. The following week, he broke a bone in his foot and spent most of the rest of the season in rehabilitation, practicing but not playing in the final month of the season to earn a medical red shirt. The next season Short started every game at rush end/linebacker and led the Nittany Lions with 12 tackles for -50 yards, while his 3.5 sacks for -20 yards was among the team's best. His tackle total was 48 (20 solo) and he caused and recovered a fumble, blocked a field goal and broke up two passes. He was in for 812 plays. Everything began to click for Short as he got used to his new position and he totaled a season-high 10 tackles, and caused and recovered a fumble in the season finale with Michigan State. His play in the Fiesta Bowl included six stops, among them two tackles for loss (-11 yards) and a sack.

=== Sophomore season ===
On the original list of Butkus Award candidates, Short made stops (42 solo), fourth on the team, despite missing the better part of three games with an ankle injury. He started eight regular season games and was in for 563 snaps. Short anchored a defense that while bending and giving up some yardage, managed to hold six teams to 17 points or less. He recorded 12 tackles for losses, tied for second on the team, with 2.5 sacks, an interception and three pass breakups. Short earned team Defensive MVP honors in the Citrus Bowl.

=== Junior season ===
Short led the Lions resurgence and topped the squad in tackles en route to first-team All-Big Ten honors. He recorded 67 tackles (49 solo) with 15 tackles for -42 yards. and 5.5 sacks. A semi-finalist for the Butkus Award. Short tied his career high with 10 stops (8 solo) at Minnesota, including a career best 3 sacks to earn Big Ten Defensive Player of the Week, and ABC Player of the Game honors.

Short earned his Bachelor of Science degree in marketing from Penn State in 1999.

== Professional career ==
A fourth-round pick of the New York Giants (#105 overall) in the 2000 NFL draft played five seasons for the New York Giants and two for the Carolina Panthers.

In his rookie year saw action in 11 regular season games and was inactive for five games because of an ankle injury. Appeared in all three of the Giants postseason contest, including Super Bowl XXXV.

Short was involved in an infamous 2002 training camp cafeteria fistfight with teammate Jeremy Shockey. The two players brawled after Shockey, a rookie, refused to sing his college fight song—a training camp hazing ritual.

Short was in the news again after he broke New York Jets quarterback Chad Pennington's wrist during a tackle in the 2003 Giants-Jets preseason game. Pennington would miss the first six games of the 2003 season.

Short signed as a free agent with the Carolina Panthers in 2004, and appeared in all 32 games at strongside linebacker with Carolina in 2004 and 2005. He tallied 70 tackles and helped the Panther's defense collect 38 take-aways, which tied a team record. He returned to the New York Giants in April 2006, signing as a free agent.

== NFL career statistics ==
Year	Team	GP	Tackles				Fumbles			Interceptions					
Year	Team	GP	Cmb	Solo	Ast	Sck	FF	FR	Yds	Int	Yds	Avg	Lng	TD	PD
2000	NYG	11	3	3	0	0.0	0	0	0	0	0	0.0	0	0	0
2001	NYG	16	61	45	16	1.0	0	1	0	1	21	21.0	21	0	4
2002	NYG	16	88	63	25	3.0	0	1	0	1	32	32.0	32	0	2
2003	NYG	16	74	48	26	3.0	2	1	0	0	0	0.0	0	0	2
2004	CAR	16	53	40	13	0.0	1	0	0	0	0	0.0	0	0	0
2005	CAR	16	60	42	18	0.5	0	0	0	0	0	0.0	0	0	1
2006	NYG	9	45	38	7	2.0	2	0	0	0	0	0.0	0	0	2
Career		100	384	279	105	9.5	5	3	0	2	53	26.5	32	0	11

== Post-NFL career ==
Short was an NFL analyst for Daily News Live, a current T.V. show with NY media panels who analyze NY sports on the SNY Network in NYC. He earned an MBA from Columbia Business School in 2010, and began working for Goldman Sachs that year. He moved to the firm's Dubai unit in 2012.

Short left Goldman Sachs in April 2013 to co-found World Business Partners UAE, a Middle East lender specializing in loans for small- and medium-sized companies which comply with Islam's ban on interest, along with the religion's bans on investments in alcohol, firearms, and other products. In 2015, Short moved to London where he joined Cerberus Capital Management. In 2017, he moved to Round Hill Capital, a fully integrated real estate investment and management firm, where he is Director of Mergers and Acquisitions. In 2018 Short was elected to the Pennsylvania State University's board of trustees.
