= Will Allen (cornerback) =

American football player (born 1978)

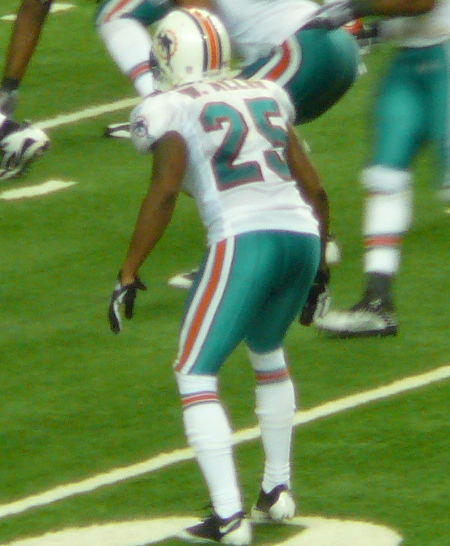
- Allen with the Miami Dolphins in 2009

No. 25, 38, 26
- Position: Cornerback

Personal information
- Born: August 5, 1978 (age 48); Syracuse, New York, U.S.
- Listed height: 5 ft 10 in (1.78 m)
- Listed weight: 195 lb (88 kg)

Career information
- High school: Corcoran (Syracuse)
- College: Syracuse (1996–2000)
- NFL draft: 2001: 1st round, 22nd overall pick

Career history
- New York Giants (2001–2005); Miami Dolphins (2006–2011); New England Patriots (2012)

Awards and highlights
- First-team All-Big East (2000)

Career NFL statistics
- Total tackles: 532
- Sacks: 5
- Forced fumbles: 7
- Fumble recoveries: 6
- Interceptions: 15
- Defensive touchdowns: 1
- Stats at Pro Football Reference

Will D. Allen (born August 5, 1978) is an American former professional football player who was a cornerback in the National Football League (NFL). Allen played college football for the Syracuse Orange. He was selected in the first round of the 2001 NFL draft by the New York Giants.

Allen has also played for the Miami Dolphins and New England Patriots.

== Early life ==
Allen attended Corcoran High School in his hometown of Syracuse, New York, where he excelled in football and track. He only played two years of varsity football, both at cornerback, but he managed to collect a career total of 17 interceptions, including a school-record 11 as a senior. In addition, he also played wide receiver as a senior, catching 23 passes for 460 yards, a 20-yard average per-reception. He helped lead his team to consecutive 10–1 seasons. He was awarded first-team All-New York State and All-Central New York honors as a senior in 1995, and was a first-team all-conference cornerback in both seasons. His high school selected him as Athlete of the Year for 1995–96. Allen placed third in New York State with a 10.5 second time in the 100-meter dash in his senior year.

== College career ==
Opting to remain in his hometown, Allen accepted an athletic scholarship to play football for the Syracuse University Orangemen. After redshirting as a freshman in the 1996 season, Allen proved to be an outstanding cornerback and kickoff returner, playing in 43 games with 28 starts, including 28 starts in 31 games played over his final three seasons. He is regarded as one of the fastest players to ever play for Syracuse, and recorded a 4.29 second time in the 40-yard dash.

== Professional career ==
Pre-draft measurables
Height	Weight	Arm length	Hand span	40-yard dash	10-yard split	20-yard split	20-yard shuttle	Three-cone drill	Vertical jump	Broad jump	Bench press
5 ft 10 1/2 in (1.79 m)	192 lb (87 kg)	30 in (0.76 m)	7 1/2 in (0.19 m)	4.41 s	1.54 s	2.55 s	3.90 s	6.78 s	39.5 in (1.00 m)	10 ft 1 in (3.07 m)	14 reps
All values from NFL Combine

=== New York Giants ===
Allen was selected in the first round of the 2001 NFL draft by the New York Giants, where he played for his first five seasons from 2001 to 2005. After the 2005 season, the Giants opted to sign free agent Sam Madison rather than re-sign Allen to a new contract. Though Allen was capable of maintaining good position, he struggled to make interceptions (four interceptions after his rookie season).

=== Miami Dolphins ===
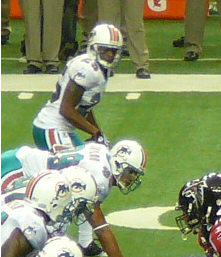
Will Allen and Jason Taylor line up against the Atlanta Falcons.

On March 19, 2006, Will signed a four-year, $12 million contract with the Miami Dolphins.

Though he struggled to consistently produce interceptions he gained a reputation for being one of the best cover corners in the secondary. As of Week 17 of the 2008 NFL season, Allen recorded three interceptions, the second of which he returned for what would be his first career defensive touchdown in a win by the Dolphins over the Denver Broncos. His final interception of the season came against the Buffalo Bills in Week 14 in a win by the Dolphins.

On May 26, 2009, Dolphins signed Will Allen to a $16.2 million extension through 2011. The deal included $10 million guaranteed.

In Week 6 in a game versus the New Orleans Saints, Allen injured his knee during the game. After the game, it was announced that Allen tore his ACL and was put on injured reserve.

Allen was arrested February 20, 2010 and charged with driving under the influence when he was stopped in a late-model Ferrari at 3:30 a.m. at the corner of Fifth Street and Alton Road, said Miami Beach police spokesman Detective Juan Sanchez.

According to the arrest report, Allen approached a police road-block and instead of following the detour, he kept driving toward a police car, stopping only two feet from it.

Allen was placed on injured reserve September 5, 2010 because of a knee, just one week before season opener ending his 2010 season.

Allen would go on to restructure his contract with the team. He was set to make $5.5 million in 2011, and took a pay cut to come back. The 11-year veteran has battled injury problems of late, and should be the team's nickel back behind Vontae Davis and Sean Smith.

On September 3, 2011, the Dolphins terminated Allen's contract.

The Dolphins re-signed Will Allen on September 14, 2011, after releasing Benny Sapp.

=== New England Patriots ===
Allen signed with the New England Patriots on March 21, 2012, to a one-year contract for the NFL minimum. He was placed on injured reserve on August 27, 2012.

== NFL career statistics ==
Legend
**Bold**	Career high

=== Regular season ===
Year	Team	Games		Tackles					Interceptions					Fumbles			
Year	Team	GP	GS	Cmb	Solo	Ast	Sck	TFL	Int	Yds	TD	Lng	PD	FF	FR	Yds	TD
2001	NYG	13	12	45	41	4	0.0	2	**4**	27	0	17	14	0	1	0	0
2002	NYG	15	15	58	53	5	0.0	2	1	0	0	0	11	0	0	0	0
2003	NYG	12	12	42	35	7	0.0	0	2	23	0	22	14	0	1	0	0
2004	NYG	**16**	**16**	**81**	**75**	6	1.0	3	1	11	0	11	**19**	1	0	0	0
2005	NYG	**16**	**16**	73	65	8	0.0	1	1	17	0	17	11	1	1	0	0
2006	MIA	15	15	57	43	**14**	1.0	3	1	11	0	11	11	1	**3**	**1**	0
2007	MIA	**16**	**16**	62	48	**14**	**2.0**	4	1	14	0	14	14	**3**	0	0	0
2008	MIA	**16**	**16**	50	42	8	1.0	3	3	**62**	**1**	**32**	15	1	0	0	0
2009	MIA	6	6	21	19	2	0.0	0	2	27	0	21	6	0	0	0	0
2011	MIA	15	6	43	39	4	0.0	**5**	0	0	0	0	3	0	0	0	0
		140	130	532	460	72	5.0	23	15	192	1	32	118	7	6	1	0

=== Playoffs ===
Year	Team	Games		Tackles					Interceptions					Fumbles			
Year	Team	GP	GS	Cmb	Solo	Ast	Sck	TFL	Int	Yds	TD	Lng	PD	FF	FR	Yds	TD
2002	NYG	**1**	**1**	**5**	**5**	0	0.0	0	0	0	0	0	0	0	0	0	0
2005	NYG	**1**	**1**	4	3	**1**	0.0	**1**	0	0	0	0	0	0	0	0	0
2008	MIA	**1**	**1**	**5**	**5**	0	0.0	0	0	0	0	0	0	0	0	0	0
		3	3	14	13	1	0.0	1	0	0	0	0	0	0	0	0	0

== Arrest and conviction ==
In 2015, Allen was arrested and charged with running a $35 million Ponzi scheme. The scheme allegedly involved giving loans to professional athletes. He and his partner Susan Daub pleaded guilty to federal fraud, conspiracy, and money laundering charges.

In March 2017, Allen was sentenced to 6 years in prison and ordered to pay $16.8 million in restitution.
