= Trey Junkin =

American football player (born 1961)

No. 50, 56, 87, 83, 89, 86
- Position: Long snapper

Personal information
- Born: January 23, 1961 (age 65); Conway, Arkansas, U.S.
- Listed height: 6 ft 2 in (1.88 m)
- Listed weight: 240 lb (109 kg)

Career information
- High school: North Little Rock (North Little Rock, Arkansas)
- College: Louisiana Tech
- NFL draft: 1983: 4th round, 93rd overall pick

Career history
- Buffalo Bills (1983–1984); Washington Redskins (1984); Los Angeles Raiders (1985–1989); Seattle Seahawks (1990–1995); Oakland Raiders (1996); Arizona Cardinals (1996–2001); Dallas Cowboys (2002)*; New York Giants (2002)
- * Offseason or practice squad member only

Career NFL statistics
- Games played: 281
- Games started: 4
- Receptions: 17
- Receiving yards: 144
- Receiving touchdowns: 7
- Stats at Pro Football Reference

Abner Kirk "Trey" Junkin III (born January 23, 1961) is an American former professional football player who was a long snapper in the National Football League (NFL). Junkin played college football for the Louisiana Tech Bulldogs. While he played mostly as a long snapper, he also played at the tight end and linebacker positions. His 281 games played at the position is currently an NFL record.

== Early life ==
Junkin attended Northeast High School in North Little Rock, Arkansas, and was a football star.

== Professional career ==
Junkin played 19 seasons in the NFL for six different teams: Buffalo Bills (1983–1984), Washington Redskins (1984), Los Angeles/Oakland Raiders (1985–1989, 1996), Seattle Seahawks (1990–1995), Arizona Cardinals (1996–2001), plus a single game with the New York Giants in 2002. Primarily a long snapper and special teams player throughout his career, Junkin started out as a linebacker and later moved to tight end.

It is his one game with the Giants for which Junkin is most remembered. The Giants coaxed the retired veteran back to replace an injured Dan O'Leary. In a 2002 Wild Card playoff game against the San Francisco 49ers, Junkin botched a snap on a field goal attempt that could have won the game for the Giants, who had squandered a 38–14 lead. Holder Matt Allen attempted to pass the ball to Rich Seubert, but it fell incomplete. There was an uncalled pass interference penalty on the play, which could have led to another field goal attempt as a result of off-setting penalties, as the Giants were penalized for having an ineligible man downfield (which the referees wrongly called on Seubert, who had in fact checked in as eligible; the actual ineligible man downfield was Tam Hopkins). Junkin took full responsibility and said that the Giants lost this game because of him. This play ultimately became #10 on NFL Top 10's Top Ten Meltdowns and Top Ten Controversial Calls at #7.

After the 2002 NFL season, Junkin went on to coach in the Canadian Football League for the Calgary Stampeders. After a short stint with the Stampeders, he rejoined his family in Winnfield, Louisiana. Junkin is now the defensive coordinator for his son Connor's high school football team, the Winnfield Senior High Tigers.

Junkin is the older brother of former NFL linebacker Mike Junkin.
