= Chris Bober =

American football player (born 1976)

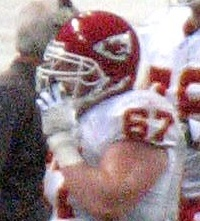
- Bober with the Kansas City Chiefs in 2006

No. 67
- Positions: Guard, center

Personal information
- Born: December 24, 1976 (age 49); Omaha, Nebraska, U.S.
- Listed height: 6 ft 5 in (1.96 m)
- Listed weight: 310 lb (141 kg)

Career information
- High school: Omaha South
- College: Nebraska–Omaha
- NFL draft: 2000: undrafted

Career history
- New York Giants (2000–2003); Kansas City Chiefs (2004–2007)

Career NFL statistics
- Games played: 91
- Games started: 37
- Stats at Pro Football Reference

Chris Scott Bober (/ˈboʊbər/ BOH-bər; born December 24, 1976) is an American former professional football player who was a guard and center in the National Football League (NFL). He was signed by the New York Giants as an undrafted free agent in 2000. He played college football for the hometown Nebraska–Omaha Mavericks. He had also played football at Omaha South High School.

Bober has also played for the Kansas City Chiefs in his career.

== College career ==
Bober played college football and started 45 consecutive games as an offensive lineman at the University of Nebraska at Omaha. There he earned first-team American Football Coaches Association, first-team All-America by Daktronics/CoSIDA, Football News All-America honors along with first-team All America and Division II Offensive Lineman of the Year by Gazette Magazine when his club led Division II with 335.2 rushing yards per game in 1999. He was also a first-team All-America selection by Daktronics/CoSIDA his junior year, along with first-team-All North Central Conference and Most Valuable Offensive Lineman in 1998 and 1999. He was a team captain his senior year at UNO and offensive captain of his Snow Bowl team, a division II All Star game. Bober returned to college in the off seasons, graduating from Nebraska–Omaha with a degree in General Studies in May 2006, earning the NFL's Continuing Education Award.

== Professional career ==
=== New York Giants ===
Bober spent the first ten weeks of the 2000 season on the practice squad before being promoted to the 53-man roster on November 6, 2000. He was also inactive for three games and was active for three contests, but did not see any game action, staying inactive for three postseason games, including Super Bowl XXXV vs. the Baltimore Ravens (1/28/01).

In 2001 he played in all 16 games on special teams and two games as a reserve offensive lineman. He saw action at both right and left tackle because of injuries at Minnesota.

Next season Bober opened 15 games at center. He opened training camp battling for a starting position at right tackle, but moved to center due to injuries along the club's offensive front. Bober started his first NFL game at center vs. the San Francisco 49ers and also handled the long-snapping duties for placements vs. the Washington Redskins. He was inactive at Houston (11/24) due to a left biceps injury. Bober started at center in the club's NFC Wild Card contest at San Francisco.

2003 was his final year with New York. He started all 16 games for the first time in his career; opened 11 games at center and five games at right tackle. He shifted to the starting center position for the season's final ten contests after starting guard Rich Seubert suffered a season-ending injury.

=== Kansas City Chiefs ===
With Kansas City, Bober played in 12 games on offense and special teams, getting two starts at right tackle. He was inactive for four games. He played in the club's jumbo package and on special teams at Denver and vs. Carolina. Saw action as a reserve right tackle and on special teams vs. Houston. Played in the team's jumbo package and on special teams at Baltimore. Started his first game for the Chiefs at right tackle in place of an injured John Welbourn vs. San Diego. Started at right tackle at Oakland (12/5), but left the game in the second quarter with a right toe sprain.

After that he played in 16 games on special teams and eight contests on offense with two starts at right tackle. Saw reserve action at right tackle vs. the New York Jets. Started at right tackle in place of Jordan Black who opened at left tackle in place of an injured Willie Roaf at Oakland and at Denver. Opened as a reserve right tackle and on the placement protection team at Miami also played in the club's jumbo package and on the placement protection team at San Diego and vs. Oakland. Recovered a fumble by Wide receiver Dante Hall on a kickoff return in the third quarter at Houston.

On February 29, 2008, the Chiefs released Bober.
