= Kenny Holmes =

American football player and coach (born 1973)

FIU Panthers
- Position: Defensive lineman

Personal information
- Born: October 24, 1973 (age 53); Gifford, Florida, U.S.
- Listed height: 6 ft 4 in (1.93 m)
- Listed weight: 265 lb (120 kg)

Career information
- High school: Vero Beach (FL)
- College: Miami (FL)
- NFL draft: 1997: 1st round, 18th overall pick

Career history
- Tennessee Oilers / Titans (1997–2000); New York Giants (2001–2003); Green Bay Packers (2004)*
- * Offseason or practice squad member only

Career NFL statistics
- Tackles: 273
- Sacks: 38.5
- Forced fumbles: 9
- Fumble recoveries: 9
- Interceptions: 2
- Defensive touchdowns: 2
- Stats at Pro Football Reference

Kenneth Jerome Holmes (born October 24, 1973) is an American former professional football player who was a defensive end in the National Football League (NFL). He was selected by the Tennessee Oilers 18th overall in the 1997 NFL draft. He played college football for the Miami Hurricanes.

Holmes also played for the New York Giants.

== College career ==
In 1992, Holmes was awarded an athletic scholarship by the University of Miami where he completed a bachelor's degree in liberal arts. While at the University of Miami, Holmes was a two-time first-team All-Big East selection, gracing the cover of Sports Illustrated. During his four years as a Hurricane, he also served two consecutive terms as the captain for the football program and totaled 29 sacks and 207 tackles for his career. In 1996–97 Holmes had a career high of 11.5 sacks, ranking second in all-time sacks for Miami at the time.

== Professional career ==
Holmes was drafted in the first round of the 1997 NFL draft by the Tennessee Oilers and help lead the Titans to their first and only Super Bowl XXXIV. In 2001, he signed as a free agent with the New York Giants.

After an outstanding collegiate career at the University of Miami, Kenny became the Tennessee Oilers first round (18th overall selection) pick in the 1997 NFL Draft. Holmes, a quick, agile, player with powerful hands, became known for his ability to pressure the quarterback and punish blockers while firing into the back field rushing the quarterback. As the franchise's first draft choice in its inaugural season, Kenny lived up to expectations by tying for team leads in sacks and ultimately demonstrated why he was considered one of the most promising Defensive Ends in the National Football League (NFL). As a result of his performance, he was selected for the All Rookie team. He also recorded a forced fumble in 4 consecutive games in 2000. In 1999, the Titans made it to Super Bowl XXXIV in which Holmes started on the number one ranked defense in the NFL. During the 2001 season, Holmes and Jevon Kearse made up the bookends that led the NFL in total sacks and defense. Among his many accomplishments and awards as a Titan, Holmes received the ED Block Courage Award in 2000 and the Titans Man of the Year Award in 2001. After completing his contract with the Tennessee Titans, Holmes signed as a Free Agent with the New York Giants and partnered with Michael Strahan to lead the team to the playoffs in 2003. He recorded 38.5 sacks in seven NFL seasons.

== NFL career statistics ==
Legend
	Led the league
**Bold**	Career high

=== Regular season ===
Year	Team	Games		Tackles				Interceptions				Fumbles			
Year	Team	GP	GS	Comb	Solo	Ast	Sck	Int	Yds	TD	Lng	FF	FR	Yds	TD
1997	TEN	16	5	33	28	5	7.0	0	0	0	0	1	1	0	0
1998	TEN	14	11	33	22	11	2.5	0	0	0	0	0	0	0	0
1999	TEN	14	7	19	12	7	4.0	**2**	**17**	0	**19**	1	0	0	0
2000	TEN	14	13	37	32	5	**8.0**	0	0	0	0	**5**	0	0	0
2001	NYG	16	16	59	41	**18**	3.5	0	0	0	0	1	**4**	12	0
2002	NYG	15	15	**62**	**45**	17	**8.0**	0	0	0	0	0	2	**50**	**1**
2003	NYG	9	9	30	23	7	5.5	0	0	0	0	1	2	0	**1**
Career		98	76	273	203	70	38.5	2	17	0	19	9	9	62	2

=== Playoffs ===
Year	Team	Games		Tackles				Interceptions				Fumbles			
Year	Team	GP	GS	Comb	Solo	Ast	Sck	Int	Yds	TD	Lng	FF	FR	Yds	TD
1999	TEN	4	4	**6**	**6**	0	**2.0**	0	0	0	0	**2**	0	0	0
2000	TEN	1	1	1	0	**1**	0.0	0	0	0	0	0	0	0	0
2002	NYG	1	1	1	1	0	0.0	0	0	0	0	0	0	0	0
Career		6	6	8	7	1	2.0	0	0	0	0	2	0	0	0

== Coaching career ==
Holmes was the defensive line coach at the University of Idaho from 2015 to 2016.
