= Jeff Hatch =

American football player (born 1979)

No. 76
- Position: Tackle

Personal information
- Born: September 28, 1979 (age 47); Annapolis, Maryland, U.S.

Career information
- High school: Severn School (Severna Park, Maryland)
- College: University of Pennsylvania
- NFL draft: 2002: 3rd round, 78th overall pick

Career history
- New York Giants (2002–2003); Tampa Bay Buccaneers (2005)

Career NFL statistics
- Games played: 4
- Games started: 4
- Stats at Pro Football Reference

Jeffrey P. Hatch (born September 28, 1979) is an American former professional football player who was an offensive tackle in the National Football League (NFL) for three seasons between 2002 and 2005. He was on the rosters of the New York Giants and Tampa Bay Buccaneers, starting in four games for the Giants in 2003. He played his college football at the University of Pennsylvania, and was named a Division I-AA All-American in 2001. The Giants selected Hatch during the third round of the 2002 NFL draft with the 78th overall pick.

Hatch starred in two documentaries; ESPN's Hey Rookie, Welcome to the NFL, and CNN/SI's, Goal To Go. Hatch is also a noted artist, having shown and sold his paintings and photographs around the country. He has also spent time acting and doing stunt work in Hollywood, with notable roles in the Jeff Bridges and Ryan Reynolds led R.I.P.D., as well as the lead role in a mid-level independent film, Brutal.

According to Politico in a July 22, 2019, article, Hatch pleaded guilty to a drug charge on July 19, 2019. He was sentenced to three years probation but has maintained his sobriety since his arrest. He now works as a recovery advocate and keynote speaker.
