= Bob Jones (long snapper) =

American football player (born 1978)

No. 79
- Position: Long snapper

Personal information
- Born: September 3, 1978 (age 48); Barberton, Ohio, U.S.
- Listed height: 6 ft 3 in (1.91 m)
- Listed weight: 270 lb (122 kg)

Career information
- High school: Wadsworth (Wadsworth, Ohio)
- College: Penn State (1997–2001)
- NFL draft: 2002: undrafted

Career history
- Pittsburgh Steelers (2002)*; New York Giants (2002)
- * Offseason or practice squad member only

Career NFL statistics
- Games played: 11
- Tackles: 1
- Stats at Pro Football Reference

Robert Thomas Jones (born September 3, 1978) is an American former football long snapper who played in the National Football League (NFL) with the Pittsburgh Steelers and New York Giants. He played college football for the Penn State Nittany Lions.

== Football career ==
Jones played football at Penn State from 1998–2001 as a defensive lineman, being named a starter in each of those years. He went undrafted in the 2002 NFL draft.

He eventually signed with the New York Giants, and was named the starting long snapper for the 2002 season. He performed the Giants' long snapping duties for the first 11 games of the 2002 NFL season before a botched snap leading to a safety and eventual loss to the Houston Texans resulted in his release.
