= Jeremy Shockey =

American football player (born 1980)

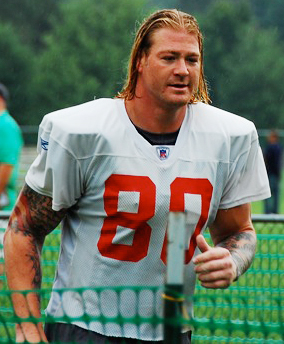
- Shockey with the New York Giants in 2007

No. 80, 88
- Position: Tight end

Personal information
- Born: August 18, 1980 (age 46); Ada, Oklahoma, U.S.
- Listed height: 6 ft 5 in (1.96 m)
- Listed weight: 251 lb (114 kg)

Career information
- High school: Ada
- College: Northeastern Oklahoma A&M (1999); Miami (FL) (2000–2001)
- NFL draft: 2002: 1st round, 14th overall pick

Career history
- New York Giants (2002–2007); New Orleans Saints (2008–2010); Carolina Panthers (2011)

Awards and highlights
- 2× Super Bowl champion (XLII, XLIV); Pepsi NFL Rookie of the Year (2002); First-team All-Pro (2002); 4× Pro Bowl (2002, 2003, 2005, 2006); PFWA All-Rookie Team (2002); 48th greatest New York Giant of all-time; NFL Alumni Tight End of the Year (2005); BCS national champion (2001); First-team All-American (2001); Grantland Rice Trophy (2001)

Career NFL statistics
- Receptions: 547
- Receiving yards: 6,143
- Receiving touchdowns: 37
- Stats at Pro Football Reference

Jeremy Charles Shockey (born August 18, 1980) is an American former professional football player who was a tight end in the National Football League (NFL). He played college football for the Miami Hurricanes, earning first-team All-American honors in 2002. He was selected by the New York Giants in the first round of the 2002 NFL draft as the 14th pick.

The winner of the first-ever Diet Pepsi NFL Rookie of the Year Award in 2002, Shockey earned four Pro Bowl selections in his career and won the Super Bowl with the Giants in Super Bowl XLII and the Saints in Super Bowl XLIV.

== Early life ==
Shockey was born August 18, 1980, in Ada, Oklahoma. A 1999 graduate of Ada High School, Shockey lettered all four seasons, playing mostly at wide receiver and outside linebacker. As a senior he caught 50 passes for 1,108 yards and five touchdowns. He also returned four punts for touchdowns and was named to Oklahoma's All-District, All-County, and All-State teams. Playing in the State Semi-final game of his senior year, he caught eight passes for 206 yards, but his team lost in an upset to Chickasha High School. He also played basketball and was an honor roll student.

== College career ==
After high school, Shockey briefly attended Northeastern Oklahoma A&M in the hopes of being recruited by the University of Oklahoma. However, Oklahoma wasn't interested and Shockey eventually earned a scholarship to and attended the University of Miami, where he was part of the school's long tradition of star tight ends. As a Hurricane, Shockey first rose to national attention as a sophomore in Miami's 2000 game versus rival Florida State, catching what proved to be the game-winning touchdown pass with :46 remaining in the fourth quarter as #7 Miami defeated the then-top ranked Seminoles, 27–24. The Hurricanes went 11–1 and Shockey received first-team All-Big East honors from the league's coaches, The Sporting News, and College Football News.

In 2001, Shockey was an integral member of the national championship Miami team. Shockey led the team with 45 receptions and had 604 yards receiving and eight touchdowns (including bowl statistics). He was one of three finalists for the Mackey Award, and was named a first-team All-American by CNNSI, and a second-team All-American by the Associated Press, CBS Sportsline, and ABC Sports. Having reached the status of national champion and All-American, Shockey declared himself eligible for the NFL draft following the 2001 season.

Shockey was interviewed about his time at the University of Miami for the documentary The U, which premiered December 12, 2009, on ESPN. He also appeared in the documentary's sequel, The U Part 2.

== Professional career ==
Pre-draft measurables
Height	Weight
6 ft 4 3/4 in (1.95 m)	255 lb (116 kg)
Values from NFL Combine

=== New York Giants ===
Shockey was selected 14th in the first round of the 2002 NFL draft by the New York Giants. He quickly thrived in the NFL, receiving the inaugural Diet Pepsi NFL Rookie of the Year award, and being named to the Pro Bowl in four of his first five seasons (2002, 2003, 2005, and 2006). He was one of the focal points in the Giants offensive passing attack.

Shockey signed a five-year contract extension with the Giants on October 12, 2005, making him the highest paid tight end in professional football. The contract had Shockey earning $26.38 million through 2011. Shockey turned in another strong performance during the 2006 season, catching 66 passes for 623 yards and tying a career-high with seven touchdown receptions. For his efforts, Shockey was named to the Pro Bowl.

Possessing great athletic abilities to run routes and make crucial blocks, Shockey is equally known for his sometimes brash comments on other players and the media and for his antics off the field. During week 3 of the 2006 NFL season, he commented on a loss against Seattle by saying "We got outplayed, and we got outcoached. Write that down." Shockey apologized for the comment after speaking with head coach Tom Coughlin.

On December 16, 2007, in week 15 of the season, while playing against the Washington Redskins, Shockey suffered a fractured fibula and damage to his ankle. He underwent surgery, and would be out for the rest of the 2007 season. Kevin Boss then took over Shockey's spot as the starting tight end.

After Shockey's season-ending injury, the Giants went on to win the NFC title and beat the previously undefeated New England Patriots in Super Bowl XLII. The Giants' success even without Shockey sparked immediate speculation that the team would be better without the often vocal and increasingly injured tight end. Shockey declined to participate in several Giants team celebrations, including a White House tribute for the new Super Bowl champions and the team's blue carpet ring ceremony. Rumors surfaced before the 2008 NFL draft that the Giants were looking to trade Shockey.

After the draft came and went without such a trade, the team stated it planned to keep Shockey a Giant. But it was obvious that Shockey was upset during the team's minicamp in June. While teammates practiced, Shockey stayed in the locker room, much to the dismay of head coach Tom Coughlin. There also was a report that Shockey and general manager Jerry Reese got into a shouting argument during the camp.

=== New Orleans Saints ===
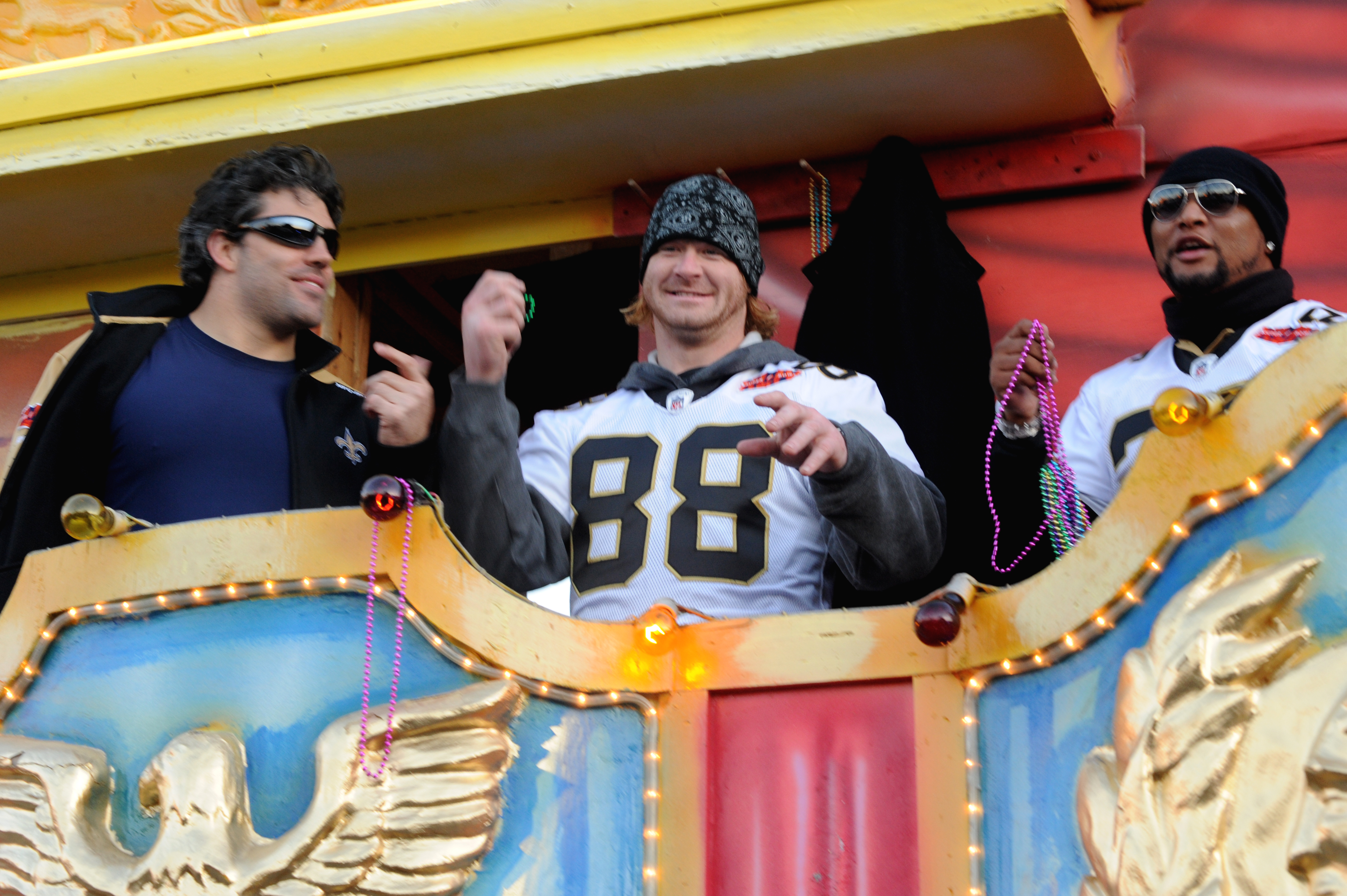
Shockey (center) at the Saints' Super Bowl XLIV victory parade, February 2010

On July 21, 2008, the Giants agreed to trade Shockey to the New Orleans Saints in exchange for second and fifth-round picks in the 2009 NFL draft. He attempted to start the relationship with his new team on a good note, telling the Associated Press shortly after that trade, "The Saints have a lot of weapons, starting with Drew Brees, and I look forward to joining my teammates at training camp. This will be a fun year." In his first game against the Tampa Bay Buccaneers, he had 6 receptions for 54 yards. After three games with the Saints, Shockey had a sports hernia and sat for 3 weeks. In the 2008 NFL season, he caught 50 passes for a career low 483 yards and a career low 0 touchdowns. In 2009, Shockey became an important offensive weapon for the Saints, catching 48 passes for 569 yards and averaging close to 12 yards per reception. Throughout the season, Shockey was again plagued with injuries. Despite an injured knee, Shockey caught a pass for a touchdown in the Saints' playoff victory over the Arizona Cardinals. In Super Bowl XLIV, Shockey caught the go-ahead touchdown pass from Drew Brees. Shockey got his second championship title as the Saints won their first Super Bowl in franchise history by defeating the Indianapolis Colts 31–17.

On February 22, 2011, Shockey was released by the Saints.

=== Carolina Panthers ===
On March 3, 2011, Shockey signed with the Panthers for a one-year $4 million deal, with $1 million guaranteed. Shockey played 15 games, catching 37 passes for 455 yards, averaging 12.3 yards per reception and 4 touchdowns.

== Career statistics ==
Legend
	Won the Super Bowl
**Bold**	Career high

=== NFL ===
Year	Team	Games		Receiving					Fumbles	
Year	Team	GP	GS	Rec	Yds	Avg	Lng	TD	Fum	Lost
2002	NYG	15	14	**74**	**894**	12.1	30	2	**3**	**2**
2003	NYG	9	9	48	535	11.1	46	2	1	1
2004	NYG	15	15	61	666	10.9	38	6	1	0
2005	NYG	15	15	65	891	**13.7**	59	**7**	0	0
2006	NYG	15	15	66	623	9.4	25	**7**	0	0
2007	NYG	14	14	57	619	10.9	29	3	0	0
2008	NO	12	11	50	483	9.7	26	0	2	**2**
2009	NO	13	12	48	569	11.9	**66**	3	0	0
2010	NO	13	11	41	408	10.0	31	3	0	0
2011	CAR	15	13	37	455	12.3	29	4	2	1
Total		136	129	547	6,143	11.2	66	37	9	6

=== College ===
			Receiving		
Year	Team	GP	Rec	Yards	TDs
2000	Miami	10	21	296	3
2001	Miami	11	**40**	**519**	**7**
**College Totals**		**21**	**61**	**815**	**10**

== Personal life ==
Shockey has a large tattoo on his right biceps that incorporates American symbols such as the stars and stripes of the United States flag and a bald eagle. Describing the tattoo, Shockey stated: "It speaks for itself. I'm proud to live in this country, to have the right to express anything you want.... I'm very American." The tattoo took 21 hours over three days to complete with the help of tequila and cocaine. Shockey admitted it took the pain off his mind. The tattoo artist is Billy Hughes (Hell on Wheels tattoos) of Cleveland, Ohio.

While playing for the Giants, Shockey lived in West New York, New Jersey, across the Hudson River from Midtown Manhattan. While playing for the New Orleans Saints, Shockey spent his off-seasons living in Miami Beach, Florida.

In January 2013, Shockey filed for divorce after being married eight months to Daniela Cortazar-Shockey in Miami claiming the marriage was "irretrievably broken."

In 2002, Shockey said in a radio interview that he hoped there were no gay players in the NFL. "If I knew there was a gay guy on my college football team, I probably wouldn't, you know, stand for it," he told Howard Stern, adding, "I think, you know, they're going to be in the shower with us and stuff, so I don't think that's gonna work. That's not gonna work, you know?" He later told the New York Daily News, "I guess I do regret saying it. I didn't think anyone was going to make a big deal out of it. I'm not prejudiced against anybody's beliefs or what they do in their off time. I do regret saying something like that. Whatever I did to offend people, I apologize. I'm not prejudiced in any way."

A year later, New York magazine reported that he had mocked then–Dallas Cowboys coach Bill Parcells as a "homo", a comment he later denied making. A Giants team spokesman later claimed Shockey had been quoting a friend.

In 2026, Shockey revealed he underwent a vasectomy at age 21.
