= Charles Stackhouse =

American football player (born 1980)

No. 45
- Position: Fullback

Personal information
- Born: April 11, 1980 (age 46); West Memphis, Arkansas, U.S.
- Listed height: 6 ft 2 in (1.88 m)
- Listed weight: 250 lb (113 kg)

Career information
- High school: West Memphis
- College: Ole Miss
- NFL draft: 2002: undrafted

Career history
- New York Giants (2002); Minnesota Vikings (2003); Houston Texans (2004)*; New York Giants (2004)*
- * Offseason or practice squad member only

Career NFL statistics
- Rushing att-yards: 1–0
- Receptions-yards: 19–118
- Touchdowns: 3
- Stats at Pro Football Reference

Charles Stackhouse (born April 4, 1980) is an American former professional football player who was a fullback for two seasons with the New York Giants and the Minnesota Vikings of the National Football League (NFL). He played college football for the Ole Miss Rebels.
