= Matt Allen =

American football player and executive (born 1977)

No. 12
- Position: Punter

Personal information
- Born: October 23, 1977 (age 49); Montgomery, Alabama, U.S.
- Listed height: 6 ft 3 in (1.91 m)
- Listed weight: 230 lb (104 kg)

Career information
- High school: Calvary Christian (Montgomery)
- College: Troy
- NFL draft: 2001: undrafted

Career history
- Atlanta Falcons (2001)*; Seattle Seahawks (2002)*; Atlanta Falcons (2002)*; New York Giants (2002)
- * Offseason or practice squad member only

Career NFL statistics
- Punts: 63
- Punt yards: 2,045
- Punt average: 36.9
- Inside 20: 20
- Longest punt: 65
- Stats at Pro Football Reference

Matt Allen (born October 23, 1977) is an American former professional football player who was a punter in the National Football League (NFL).

Allen played college football for the Troy Trojans and signed as an undrafted free agent with the Atlanta Falcons in 2001. He played for one season with Falcons and New York Giants.

== Early life ==
Allen played football, basketball, and baseball for Calvary Christian Academy.

== College career ==
Allen played for Troy State University.

== NFL career ==
Before joining the Giants, Allen played for the Atlanta Falcons in the preseason. In his lone NFL season, Allen had 63 punts for 2,326 yards with 2,045 net yards and an average 36.9 yards per punt. He is infamously known for attempting a pass to Rich Seubert after a botched snap from Trey Junkin on a field goal attempt to win the game on the last play of the Giants-49ers NFC Wildcard game on January 5, 2003. The pass fell incomplete, ending the Giants' season, although an obvious pass interference penalty wasn't called by officials. Had that penalty been called, the Giants would have had another chance to kick the winning field goal, as it would have offset their own ineligible man downfield penalty and resulted in an extra, untimed down. However, as it was not 4th down and the team had a timeout left, Allen also could have earned another field goal attempt if he had taken a knee and then used the time out.

This play ended up being #10 on NFL Top 10's Top Ten Meltdowns and Top Ten Controversial Calls at #7.
