= Denny Marcin =

American football coach (1942–2017)

Personal information
- Born: April 24, 1942; Cleveland, Ohio
- Died: September 20, 2017 (aged 75); Southport, North Carolina

Career history
- Miami (1974–1977) Defensive coordinator/assistant head coach; North Carolina (1978–1986) Defensive coordinator; North Carolina (1987–1988) Assistant head coach; Illinois (1988–1996) Assistant head coach/defensive coordinator; New York Giants (1997–2003) Defensive line coach; New York Jets (2004–2006) Defensive line coach

Denny Marcin (April 24, 1942 – September 20, 2017) was an American football coach. He was the defensive line coach of the New York Giants from 1997 to 2003 and the New York Jets from 2004 to 2006.

He died on September 20, 2017, in Southport, North Carolina at age 75.
