= Mike Rosenthal =

American football player (born 1977)

No. 78, 75
- Position: Offensive tackle

Personal information
- Born: June 10, 1977 (age 49); Pittsburgh, Pennsylvania, U.S.
- Listed height: 6 ft 7 in (2.01 m)
- Listed weight: 318 lb (144 kg)

Career information
- High school: Penn (Mishawaka, Indiana)
- College: Notre Dame
- NFL draft: 1999: 5th round, 149th overall pick

Career history
- New York Giants (1999–2002); Minnesota Vikings (2003–2006); Miami Dolphins (2007)

Awards and highlights
- First-team All-American (1998); Jewish Sports Hall of Fame (2002)

Career NFL statistics
- Games played: 89
- Games started: 58
- Stats at Pro Football Reference

Mike Rosenthal (born June 10, 1977) is an American former professional football player who was an offensive tackle in the National Football League (NFL). He played college football for the Notre Dame Fighting Irish, earning first-team All-American honors in 1998. He was selected by the New York Giants in the fifth round of the 1999 NFL draft, and played nine seasons in the National Football League (NFL).

== Early life ==
Rosenthal was born in Pittsburgh, Pennsylvania, and is Jewish.

In high school at Penn High School, he was named USA Today All-America as a senior in Mishawaka, Indiana. He also garnered All-America honors from Parade, SuperPrep, and Blue Chip Illustrated, earning top OL honors nationally by SuperPrep and ranking # 2 by Blue Chip. He was tabbed as Indiana's Gatorade Circle of Champions Player of the Year as a senior. He lettered three times in football, and twice in basketball.

== College career ==
At Notre Dame he started every game his junior and senior years (*Actually he started all four years), playing G as a junior and T as a senior. As a senior, he was tabbed an All-American by Walter Camp Foundation and a second-team All-America by Football News. He was also honorable mention All-America by Football News as a junior, and All-Independent 1st-team choice.

He later attended St. Edward's University, graduating in 2013.

=== Awards and honors ===
- First-team All-Independent (1997)
- Honorable mention Football News All-American (1997)
- First-team Walter Camp Foundation All-American (1998)
- Second-team Football News All-American (1998)

== Professional career ==
He was selected out of Notre Dame in the fifth round of the 1999 NFL draft by the New York Giants, and played nine seasons in the NFL. In 1999, he played in 9 games with 7 starts as rookie with Giants. In 2000, he played in 8 games and started 2 for the Giants, and in 2001 he played in 7 games. In 2002, he started all 16 games and the Wildcard Playoff game at RT for the Giants.

In March 2003 he became an unrestricted free agent, and signed with the Minnesota Vikings for $1.8 million. 2003 was his first season with the Vikings, and he started all 16 games at RT for the 2nd consecutive season. He helped pave the way for the Vikings' offense to rank #1 in the NFL for the first time in team history. In 2004, he suffered a broken right foot in the second game of the season. He was placed on injured reserve on September 22. In 2005, he played in all 16 games, making 12 starts at right tackle. He lost his starting job to Marcus Johnson in late November, but came back to start the final two games of the season.

== Hall of Fame ==
Rosenthal was inducted into the Jewish Sports Hall of Fame in 2002. He was inducted into the Indiana Football Hall of Fame in 2014.

== Beyond the game ==
Rosenthal and his wife, Lindsay, own and operate “1379 Sports” (1379Sports.com), a clothing store in Austin, Texas. In 2010, Mike began teaching and coaching football at Stephen F. Austin High School in Austin, Texas and became head football coach there in December 2011. He became the head athletic director in 2012.

In 2022, Rosenthal became the athletic director of Mira Costa High School in Manhattan Beach, California.

== See also ==
- List of select Jewish football players
