= Dan O'Leary (American football) =

American football player (born 1977)

No. 87, 44, 81
- Positions: Long snapper, Tight end

Personal information
- Born: September 1, 1977 (age 49); Cleveland, Ohio, U.S.
- Listed height: 6 ft 3 in (1.91 m)
- Listed weight: 248 lb (112 kg)

Career information
- High school: St. Ignatius (Cleveland)
- College: Notre Dame (1997–2000)
- NFL draft: 2001: 6th round, 195th overall pick

Career history
- Buffalo Bills (2001); Tennessee Titans (2002)*; Pittsburgh Steelers (2002); New York Giants (2002)
- * Offseason or practice squad member only

Career NFL statistics
- Games played: 17
- Games started: 1
- Tackles: 3
- Solo: 2
- Stats at Pro Football Reference

Daniel Edward O'Leary (born September 1, 1977) is an American former professional football player who was a long snapper and tight end. He played for the Buffalo Bills, New York Giants and Pittsburgh Steelers of the National Football League (NFL). He played college football for the Notre Dame Fighting Irish and was selected in the sixth round of the 2001 NFL draft with the 195th overall pick.
