= Rich Seubert =

American football player (born 1979)

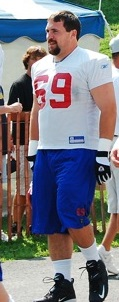
- Seubert on July 28, 2007 the first day of New York Giants training camp at the University of Albany

No. 69
- Position: Guard

Personal information
- Born: March 30, 1979 (age 47); Stratford, Wisconsin, U.S.
- Listed height: 6 ft 3 in (1.91 m)
- Listed weight: 310 lb (141 kg)

Career information
- High school: Columbus Catholic (Marshfield, Wisconsin)
- College: Western Illinois
- NFL draft: 2001: undrafted

Career history
- New York Giants (2001–2010)

Awards and highlights
- Super Bowl champion (XLII); 100th greatest New York Giant of all-time; First-team All-Gateway Conference (2000)

Career NFL statistics
- Games played: 104
- Games started: 88
- Fumble recoveries: 5
- Stats at Pro Football Reference

Richard Thomas Seubert (/ˈsɔɪbərt/; born March 30, 1979) is an American former professional football player who spent his entire career as a guard with the New York Giants of the National Football League (NFL). He played college football for the Western Illinois Leathernecks.

== Early life ==
Born in Stratford, Wisconsin, Seubert attended Columbus Catholic High School in Marshfield, Wisconsin, and was a standout in football, basketball, and baseball. He helped lead his football and basketball teams to two state championships each.

== College career ==
Seubert attended Western Illinois University and played tight end as a freshman. In his sophomore year he moved to tackle and was a first team All-Gateway honoree as a senior.

== Professional career ==
Seubert joined the New York Giants as an undrafted Free Agent in 2001. He made an impression on the Giants, and in his second season, he started at left guard for every game.

Seubert was at the center of an officiating controversy in the 2002 NFC playoffs, where the Giants faced the San Francisco 49ers. The Giants, who had led by a score of 38–14, were trailing 39-38 when Matt Bryant had a chance to kick a game-winning field goal. When Trey Junkin botched the snap, Seubert, an eligible receiver on the play, went out to try to catch holder Matt Allen's pass. Allen underthrew Seubert, who was grabbed and pulled down by Chike Okeafor, apparently drawing a pass interference penalty. Instead, an illegal man downfield penalty was called on Seubert, ending the game. The next day the NFL revealed that Seubert had checked in prior to the play, but one of his downfield teammates, Tam Hopkins, had not. Okeafor's interference call and the Hopkins call would have offset the penalties and forced a replaying of the down. The NFL drew a fair amount of criticism for the non-call on Seubert's play. The NFL later issued an official apology to the Giants in the offseason. The play ended up on NFL Top 10's Top Ten Meltdowns at #10 and #7 on Top Ten Controversial Calls.

During a game against Philadelphia in October 2003, Seubert was blocking when his opponent N. D. Kalu stepped on the back of his right leg, breaking Seubert's tibia, fibula, and ankle. After 5 surgeries, he returned to play in 2005, mainly on special teams, or filling in for injured players, as Chris Snee had taken over as the starter. In December, he made his first start since the injury, helping Tiki Barber rush for a team-record 220 yards. He regained a starting job in the 2007 season.

The Giants began to use Seubert as a tight end in 2006, but due to his jersey number (69), he must be announced over the public address system by the referees as an eligible receiver when he plays in that position. He was announced in this way roughly 20 times per game.

On March 24, 2008, he signed a 3-year extension through 2012.

Seubert started 16 games for the Giants in 2010, playing both guard and center. Seubert received praise for his solid performance from GM Jerry Reese, who remarked he was the MVP of the team.

On July 28, 2011, the Giants announced they released Seubert.

== Personal life ==
Seubert is married and has three children; Hailey (youngest), Isaac (middle), and Hunter (oldest). A resident of Warren Township, New Jersey, Seubert was named in 2016 as the head coach for the Watchung Hills Regional High School football team, where he coached both of his sons, Hunter and Isaac. Seubert has been a deer hunter since childhood.
