= 2000 Army Black Knights football team =

American college football season

2000 Army Black Knights football
- Conference: Conference USA
- Record: 1–10 (1–6 C-USA)
- Head coach: Todd Berry (1st season)
- Offensive coordinator: John Bond (1st season)
- Offensive scheme: Spread/option
- Defensive coordinator: Dennis Therrell (1st season)
- Base defense: 4–4
- Captains: Bryan Bowdish; Clint Dodson; Derrick Goodwin; Zac Hurst
- Home stadium: Michie Stadium

2000 Conference USA football standings
	Conf.			Overall
Team	W		L	W		L
Louisville $	6	–	1	9	–	3
East Carolina	5	–	2	8	–	4
Cincinnati	5	–	2	7	–	5
Southern Miss	4	–	3	8	–	4
UAB	3	–	3	7	–	4
Tulane	3	–	4	6	–	5
Memphis	2	–	5	4	–	7
Houston	2	–	5	3	–	8
Army	1	–	6	1	–	10
$ – Conference champion; Rankings from AP Poll

The 2000 Army Black Knights football team was an American football team that represented the United States Military Academy as a member of Conference USA (C-USA) in the 2000 NCAA Division I-A football season. In their first season under head coach Todd Berry, the Black Knights compiled a 1–10 record and were outscored by their opponents by a combined total of 372 to 224. In the annual Army–Navy Game, the Black Knights lost to Navy, 30–28.

Berry and offensive coordinator John Bond introduced a new offensive scheme that moved away from Army's traditional triple option offense. While the new offense still included elements of an option offense, the new scheme was more focused on passing. The Black Knights struggled under this new offense and used three different quarterbacks throughout the season who had a combined TD–INT ratio of 8 to 18. One bright spot of the season was senior running back Michael Wallace, who finished the season with 1,157 rushing yards and 11 touchdowns.

The defensive scheme was also overhauled, with defensive coordinator Dennis Therrell moving away from the 4–3 defense (four down linemen and three linebackers) used by Denny Doornbos to an aggressive 4–4 defense (four down linemen and four linebackers) intended to disrupt the opposing offense.

== Schedule ==
Date	Time	Opponent	Site	TV	Result	Attendance	Source
September 4	4:30 p.m.	at Cincinnati	Nippert Stadium; Cincinnati, OH	FSN	L 17–23	23,311	
September 9	12:00 p.m.	Boston College*	Michie Stadium; West Point, NY	FSN	L 17–55	37,544	
September 16	8:00 p.m.	at Houston	Robertson Stadium; Houston, TX		L 30–31	25,112	
September 23	1:00 p.m.	Memphis	Michie Stadium; West Point, NY		L 16–26	38,375	
October 7	8:00 p.m.	at New Mexico State*	Aggie Memorial Stadium; Las Cruces, NM		L 23–42	18,685	
October 14	7:00 p.m.	at East Carolina	Dowdy–Ficklen Stadium; Greenville, NC	FSN	L 21–42	39,200	
October 21	12:00 p.m.	Tulane	Michie Stadium; West Point, NY	FSN	W 21–17	40,107	
November 4	1:00 p.m.	Air Force*	Michie Stadium; West Point, NY (Commander-in-Chief's Trophy)		L 27–41	41,287	
November 11	2:00 p.m.	at Louisville	Papa John's Cardinal Stadium; Louisville, KY		L 17–38	40,328	
November 18	12:00 p.m.	UAB	Michie Stadium; West Point, NY		L 7–27	35,267	
December 2	12:00 p.m.	vs. Navy*	PSINet Stadium; Baltimore, MD (Army–Navy Game)	CBS	L 28–30	70,685	
*Non-conference game; All times are in Eastern time

== Game summaries ==
=== At Cincinnati ===
Army Black Knights at Cincinnati Bearcats – Game summary

Quarter	1	2	3	4	Total
Black Knights	3	0	7	7	17
Bearcats	0	6	7	10	23

at Nippert Stadium, Cincinnati, Ohio

- Date: September 4
- Game time: 4:30 p.m. EDT
- Game weather: Partly cloudy, 82 °F (28 °C)
- Game attendance: 23,311
- Referee: Rom Gilbert
- TV: FSN
- Box score

Game information
First quarter
- ARMY – Brendan Mullen 26-yard field goal, 2:52. Black Knights 3–0. Drive: 4 plays, -2 yards, 1:41.

Second quarter

- CIN – Jonathon Ruffin 30-yard field goal, 11:51. Tied 3–3. Drive: 14 plays, 67 yards, 6:01.
- CIN – Jonathon Ruffin 20-yard field goal, 0:24. Bearcats 6–3. Drive: 15 plays, 69 yards, 5:16.

Third quarter

- ARMY – Alton McCallum 1-yard run (Brendan Mullen kick), 7:58. Black Knights 10–6. Drive: 15 plays, 80 yards, 7:02.
- CIN – Ray Jackson 37-yard run (Jonathon Ruffin kick), 5:33. Bearcats 13–10. Drive: 6 plays, 76 yards, 2:25.
- ARMY – Michael Wallace 6-yard pass from Chad Jenkins (Brendan Mullen kick), 10:11. Black Knights 17–13. Drive: 14 plays, 95 yards, 4:33.
- CIN – Jason Collins-Baker 12-yard pass from Deontey Kenner (Jonathon Ruffin kick), 6:11. Bearcats 20–17. Drive: 9 plays, 78 yards, 4:00.
- CIN – Jonathon Ruffin 26-yard field goal, 0:31. Bearcats 23–17. Drive: 11 plays, 50 yards, 4:50.

Statistics	ARMY	CIN
First downs	15	25
Total yards	243	437
Rushing yards	120	198
Passing yards	123	239
Turnovers	2	2
Time of possession	25:34	34:26

Team	Category	Player	Statistics
Army	Passing	Chad Jenkins	14/29, 123 yards, TD, INT
Army	Rushing	Michael Wallace	14 rushes, 56 yards
Army	Receiving	Clint Dodson	6 receptions, 44 yards
Cincinnati	Passing	Deontey Kenner	18/29, 239 yards, TD, 2 INT
Cincinnati	Rushing	Ray Jackson	26 rushes, 108 yards, TD
Cincinnati	Receiving	Jason Collins-Baker	6 receptions, 86 yards, TD

=== Boston College ===
Boston College Eagles at Army Black Knights – Game summary

Quarter	1	2	3	4	Total
Eagles	14	6	28	7	55
Black Knights	7	3	0	7	17

at Michie Stadium, West Point, New York

- Date: September 9
- Game time: 12:00 p.m. EDT
- Game weather: Sunny and humid, 77 °F (25 °C)
- Game attendance: 37,544
- Referee: Alberto Riveron
- TV: FSN
- Box score

Game information
First quarter
- ARMY – Josh Holden 16-yard run (Brendan Mullen kick), 6:33. Black Knights 7–0. Drive: 9 plays, 80 yards, 2:39.
- BC – Cedric Washington 8-yard run (Mike Stuphin kick), 6:00. Tied 7–7. Drive: 1 play, 8 yards, 0:33.
- BC – William Green 3-yard run (Mike Stuphin kick), 3:43. Eagles 14–7. Drive: 6 plays, 32 yards, 2:04.

Second quarter

- ARMY – Brendan Mullen 27-yard field goal, 14:13. Eagles 14–10. Drive: 11 plays, 71 yards, 4:30.
- BC – Mike Stuphin 22-yard field goal, 9:23. Eagles 17–10. Drive; 12 plays, 60 yards, 4:50.
- BC – Mike Stuphin 24-yard field goal, 0:00. Eagles 20–10. Drive: 12 plays, 77 yards, 1:24.

Third quarter

- BC – Dedrick Dewalt 75-yard pass from Tim Hasselbeck (Mike Stuphin kick), 14:43. Eagles 27–10. Drive: 1 play, 75 yards, 0:17.
- BC – Curtis Bolden 22-yard interception return (Mike Stuphin kick), 14:23. Eagles 34–10.
- BC – Keith Hemmings 5-yard pass from Tim Hasselbeck (Mike Stuphin kick), 7:39. Eagles 41–10. Drive: 12 plays, 62 yards, 4:19.
- BC – Dedrick Dewalt 38-yard pass from Tim Hasselbeck (Mike Stuphin kick), 1:51. Eagles 48–10. Drive: 5 plays, 71 yards, 2:20.

Fourth quarter

- BC – Derrick Knight 13-yard run (Mike Stuphin kick), 6:32. Eagles 55–10. Drive: 11 plays, 71 yards, 5:32.
- ARMY – Clinton Woody 12-yard pass from Curtis Zervic (Brendan Mullen kick), 0:02. Eagles 55–17. Drive: 7 plays, 63 yards, 2:05.

Statistics	BC	ARMY
First downs	30	24
Total yards	587	354
Rushing yards	252	161
Passing yards	335	193
Turnovers	0	3
Time of possession	31:24	28:36

Team	Category	Player	Statistics
Boston College	Passing	Tim Hasselbeck	14/21, 256 yards, 3 TD
Boston College	Rushing	Cedric Washington	15 rushes, 100 yards, TD
Boston College	Receiving	Mike Guazzo	4 receptions, 51 yards
Army	Passing	Chad Jenkins	9/16, 77 yards, 2 INT
Army	Rushing	Michael Wallace	15 rushes, 110 yards
Army	Receiving	Clint Dodson	3 receptions, 41 yards

=== At Houston ===
Army Black Knights at Houston Cougars – Game summary

Quarter	1	2	3	4	Total
Black Knights	10	7	0	13	30
Cougars	3	3	6	19	31

at Robertson Stadium, Houston, Texas

- Date: September 16
- Game time: 8:00 p.m. EDT/7:00 p.m. CDT
- Game weather: Clear, 87 °F (31 °C)
- Game attendance: 25,112
- Referee: Gil Gelbke
- Box score

Game information
First quarter
- ARMY – Brendan Mullen 37-yard field goal, 12:46. Black Knights 3–0. Drive: 7 plays, 57 yards, 2:14.
- ARMY – Brent Dial 44-yard fumble return (Brendan Mullen kick), 12:17. Black Knights 10–0.
- HOU – Mike Clark 22-yard field goal, 2:14. Black Knights 10–3. Drive: 5 plays, 36 yards, 1:27.

Second quarter

- ARMY – Calvin Smith 8-yard pass from Joe Gerena (Brendan Mullen kick), 4:45. Black Knights 17–3. Drive: 7 plays, 34 yards, 2:39.
- HOU – Mike Clark 28-yard field goal, 0:02. Black Knights 17–6. Drive: 4 plays, 11 yards, 0:18.

Third quarter

- HOU – Joffrey Reynolds 1-yard run (pass failed), 3:55. Black Knights 17–12. Drive: 14 plays, 74 yards, 6:01.

Fourth quarter

- HOU – Joffrey Reynolds 25-yard run (pass failed), 12:55. Cougars 18–17. Drive: 8 plays, 67 yards, 3:36.
- ARMY – Michael Wallace 33-yard run (pass failed), 11:17. Black Knights 23–18. Drive: 5 plays, 79 yards, 1:38.
- ARMY – Lyle Weaver 54-yard interception return (Brendan Mullen kick), 9:21. Black Knights 30–18.
- HOU – Joffrey Reynolds 7-yard run (Mike Clark kick), 7:03. Black Knights 30–25. Drive: 7 plays, 67 yards, 2:18.
- HOU – Brian Robinson 9-yard pass from Jason McKinley (run failed), 1:17. Cougars 31–30. Drive: 9 plays, 69 yards, 4:10.

Statistics	ARMY	HOU
First downs	17	29
Total yards	357	524
Rushing yards	52	188
Passing yards	305	336
Turnovers	0	4
Time of possession	23:08	36:52

Team	Category	Player	Statistics
Army	Passing	Joe Gerena	21/41, 305 yards, TD
Army	Rushing	Michael Wallace	19 rushes, 60 yards, TD
Army	Receiving	Michael Wallace	7 receptions, 57 yards
Houston	Passing	Jason McKinley	29/46, 336 yards, TD, 2 INT
Houston	Rushing	Joffrey Reynolds	34 rushes, 201 yards, 3 TD
Houston	Receiving	Brian Robinson	13 receptions, 151 yards, TD

=== Memphis ===
Memphis Tigers at Army Black Knights – Game summary

Quarter	1	2	3	4	Total
Tigers	7	7	0	12	26
Black Knights	0	7	7	2	16

at Michie Stadium, West Point, New York

- Date: September 23
- Game time: 1:00 p.m. EDT
- Game weather: Overcast, 65 °F (18 °C)
- Game attendance: 38,375
- Referee: R. Simms
- Box score

Game information
First quarter
- MEM – Sugar Sanders 62-yard run (Ryan White kick), 11:17. Tigers 7–0. Drive: 6 plays, 90 yards, 1:51.

Second quarter

- ARMY – Omari Thompson 72-yard punt return (Brendan Mullen kick), 9:53. Tied 7–7.
- MEM – Darche Epting 1-yard run (Ryan White kick), 3:03. Tigers 14–7. Drive: 15 plays, 78 yards, 6:50.

Third quarter

- ARMY – Anthony Miller 23-yard fumble return (Brendan Mullen kick), 14:48. Tied 14–14.

Fourth quarter

- MEM – Jeremiah Bonds 31-yard pass from Neil Suber (kick failed), 8:56. Tigers 20–14. Drive: 10 plays, 69 yards, 4:09.
- MEM – Idrees Bashir 100-yard interception return (pass failed), 3:49. Tigers 26–14.
- ARMY – Neil Suber sacked in own end zone, 2:08. Tigers 26–16.

Statistics	MEM	ARMY
First downs	20	18
Total yards	338	307
Rushing yards	130	38
Passing yards	208	269
Turnovers	2	4
Time of possession	29:19	30:41

Team	Category	Player	Statistics
Memphis	Passing	Neil Suber	20/31, 187 yards, TD, INT
Memphis	Rushing	Jeff Sanders	7 rushes, 73 yards, TD
Memphis	Receiving	Al Sermon	4 receptions, 44 yards
Army	Passing	Curtis Zervic	28/38, 246 yards, 3 INT
Army	Rushing	Michael Wallace	17 rushes, 44 yards
Army	Receiving	Brian Bruenton	4 receptions, 57 yards

=== At New Mexico State ===
Army Black Knights at New Mexico State Aggies – Game summary

Quarter	1	2	3	4	Total
Black Knights	0	10	7	6	23
Aggies	7	21	7	7	42

at Aggie Memorial Stadium, Las Cruces, New Mexico

- Date: October 7
- Game time: 8:00 p.m. EDT/6:00 p.m. MDT
- Game weather: Cloudy, 52 °F (11 °C)
- Game attendance: 18,685
- Referee: Pete Gautreau
- Box score

Game information
First quarter
- NMSU – Chris Barnes 6-yard run (Dario Aguiniga kick), 7:16. Aggies 7–0. Drive: 13 plays, 60 yards, 6:34.

Second quarter

- NMSU – Ronshay Jenkins 85-yard punt return (Dario Aguiniga kick), 13:30. Aggies 14–0.
- NMSU – Oliver Soukup 46-yard interception return (Dario Aguiniga kick), 10:14. Aggies 21–0.
- ARMY – Michael Wallace 2-yard run (Brendan Mullen kick), 3:28. Aggies 21–7. Drive: 16 plays, 64 yards, 6:46.
- NMSU – Andre Banks 6-yard pass from K. C. Enzminger (Dario Aguiniga kick), 0:24. Aggies 28–7. Drive: 5 plays, 37 yards, 0:52.
- ARMY – Brendan Mullen 35-yard field goal, 0:00. Aggies 28–10. Drive: 5 plays, 50 yards, 0:24.

Third quarter

- ARMY – Alton McCallum 3-yard run (Brendan Mullen kick), 8:46. Aggies 28–17. Drive: 6 plays, 68 yards, 2:11.
- NMSU – Kenton Keith 40-yard run (Dario Aguiniga kick), 2:20. Aggies 35–17. Drive: 2 plays, 46 yards, 0:16.

Fourth quarter

- ARMY – Michael Wallace 17-yard run (kick failed), 14:16. Aggies 35–23. Drive: 2 plays, 25 yards, 0:44.
- NMSU – Jamar Lawrence 41-yard interception return (Dario Aguiniga kick), 2:04. Aggies 42–23.

Statistics	ARMY	NMSU
First downs	20	17
Total yards	379	303
Rushing yards	235	202
Passing yards	144	101
Turnovers	4	0
Time of possession	32:36	27:24

Team	Category	Player	Statistics
Army	Passing	Curtis Zervic	6/15, 84 yards, INT
Army	Rushing	Michael Wallace	18 rushes, 111 yards, 2 TD
Army	Receiving	Omari Thompson	5 receptions, 73 yards
New Mexico State	Passing	K. C. Enzminger	8/13, 65 yards, TD
New Mexico State	Rushing	Chris Barnes	23 rushes, 71 yards, TD
New Mexico State	Receiving	Manwell Talbert	5 receptions, 65 yards

=== At East Carolina ===
Army Black Knights at East Carolina Pirates – Game summary

Quarter	1	2	3	4	Total
Black Knights	0	14	7	0	21
Pirates	7	7	7	21	42

at Dowdy–Ficklen Stadium, Greenville, North Carolina

- Date: October 14
- Game time: 7:00 p.m. EDT
- Game weather: Clear, 71 °F (22 °C)
- Game attendance: 39,200
- Referee: R. G. Detillier
- TV: FSN
- Box score

Game information
First quarter
- ECU – David Garrard 1-yard run (Kevin Miller kick), 10:11. Pirates 7–0. Drive: 9 plays, 58 yards, 3:42.

Second quarter

- ARMY – Michael Wallace 4-yard run (Brendan Mullen kick), 14:21. Tied 7–7. Drive: 9 plays, 56 yards, 4:03.
- ARMY – Michael Wallace 2-yard run (Brendan Mullen kick), 2:46. Black Knights 14–7. Drive: 11 plays, 53 yards, 5:10.
- ECU – Marcellus Harris 46-yard pass from David Garrard (Kevin Miller kick), 2:03. Tied 14–14. Drive: 2 plays, 69 yards, 0:43.

Third quarter

- ARMY – Bryan Bowdish 7-yard pass from Curtis Zervic (Brendan Mullen kick), 9:46. Black Knights 21–14. Drive: 3 plays, 10 yards, 1:19.
- ECU – Leonard Henry 15-yard pass from David Garrard (Kevin Miller kick), 6:23. Tied 21–21. Drive: 9 plays, 75 yards, 3:23.

Fourth quarter

- ECU – Leonard Henry 12-yard run (Kevin Miller kick), 11:53. Pirates 28–21. Drive: 7 plays, 80 yards, 1:37.
- ECU – Jamie Wilson 5-yard run (Kevin Miller kick), 7:27. Pirates 35–21. Drive: 7 plays, 42 yards, 2:21.
- ECU – Leonard Henry 77-yard run (Kevin Miller kick), 3:21. Pirates 42–21. Drive: 1 play, 77 yards, 0:13.

Statistics	ARMY	ECU
First downs	16	23
Total yards	303	527
Rushing yards	178	332
Passing yards	125	195
Turnovers	1	2
Time of possession	32:07	27:53

Team	Category	Player	Statistics
Army	Passing	Curtis Zervic	16/29, 125 yards, TD, INT
Army	Rushing	Michael Wallace	28 rushes, 151 yards, 2 TD
Army	Receiving	Clint Dodson	2 receptions, 30 yards
East Carolina	Passing	David Garrard	14/22, 195 yards, 2 TD, 2 INT
East Carolina	Rushing	Leonard Henry	10 rushes, 134 yards, 2 TD
East Carolina	Receiving	Marcellus Harris	3 receptions, 63 yards, TD

=== Tulane ===
Tulane Green Wave at Army Black Knights – Game summary

Quarter	1	2	3	4	Total
Green Wave	0	10	0	7	17
Black Knights	0	7	7	7	21

at Michie Stadium, West Point, New York

- Date: October 21
- Game time: 12:00 p.m. EDT
- Game weather: Sunny, 68 °F (20 °C)
- Game attendance: 40,107
- Referee: R. Smith
- TV: FSN
- Box score

Game information
First quarter
- No scoring plays

Second quarter

- ARMY – Michael Wallace 95-yard run (Brendan Mullen kick), 9:11. Black Knights 7–0. Drive: 2 plays, 93 yards, 0:51.
- TUL – Seth Marler 46-yard field goal, 3:01. Black Knights 7–3. Drive: 9 plays, 40 yards, 3:42.
- TUL – Mewelde Moore 74-yard pass from Patrick Ramsey (Seth Marler kick), 0:52. Green Wave 10–7. Drive: 3 plays, 78 yards, 0:38.

Third quarter

- ARMY – Michael Wallace 8-yard run (Brendan Mullen kick), 8:45. Black Knights 14–10. Drive: 6 plays, 49 yards, 1:54.

Fourth quarter

- TUL – Kerwin Cook 15-yard pass from J. P. Losman (Seth Marler kick), 11:10. Green Wave 17–14. Drive: 10 plays, 80 yards, 3:03.
- ARMY – Clint Dodson 18-yard pass from Joe Gerena (Brendan Mullen kick), 0:40. Black Knights 21–17. Drive: 15 plays, 80 yards, 3:30.

Statistics	TUL	ARMY
First downs	21	20
Total yards	432	392
Rushing yards	164	221
Passing yards	268	171
Turnovers	2	1
Time of possession	28:41	31:19

Team	Category	Player	Statistics
Tulane	Passing	Patrick Ramsey	14/26, 170 yards, TD, 2 INT
Tulane	Rushing	J. P. Losman	13 rushes, 82 yards
Tulane	Receiving	Adria Burnette	7 receptions, 82 yards
Army	Passing	Joe Gerena	21/34, 171 yards, TD, INT
Army	Rushing	Michael Wallace	18 rushes, 183 yards, TD
Army	Receiving	Clint Dodson	8 receptions, 83 yards, TD

=== Air Force ===
Air Force Falcons at Army Black Knights – Game summary

Quarter	1	2	3	4	Total
Falcons	10	3	13	15	41
Black Knights	0	13	7	7	27

at Michie Stadium, West Point, New York

- Date: November 4
- Game time: 1:00 p.m. EST
- Game weather: Partly cloudy, 62 °F (17 °C)
- Game attendance: 41,287
- Referee: R. Simms
- Box score

Game information
First quarter
- AF – Scotty McKay 8-yard run (Dave Adams kick), 6:21. Falcons 7–0. Drive: 13 plays, 80 yards, 5:45.
- AF – Dave Adams 32-yard field goal, 2:36. Falcons 10–0. Drive: 8 plays, 13 yards, 2:50.

Second quarter

- ARMY – Michael Wallace 7-yard run (kick blocked), 13:23. Falcons 10–6. Drive: 10 plays, 74 yards, 4:13.
- ARMY – Michael Wallace 11-yard run (Brendan Mullen kick), 6:22. Black Knights 13–10. Drive: 12 plays, 80 yards, 4:46.
- AF – Dave Adams 53-yard field goal, 0:00. Tied 13–13. Drive: 9 plays, 44 yards, 1:49.

Third quarter

- AF – Nate Beard 1-yard run (Dave Adams kick), 11:35. Falcons 20–13. Drive: 9 plays, 65 yards, 3:25.
- AF – Dave Adams 54-yard field goal, 8:36. Falcons 23–13. Drive: 6 plays, 13 yards, 1:06.
- ARMY – Michael Wallace 76-yard run (Brendan Mullen kick), 8:11. Falcons 23–20. Drive: 1 play, 76 yards, 0:25.
- AF – Dave Adams 43-yard field goal, 3:57. Falcons 26–20. Drive: 13 plays, 49 yards, 4:14.

Fourth quarter

- AF – Corey Nelson 68-yard interception return (Scotty McKay run), 14:40. Falcons 34–20.
- AF – Mike Thiessen 1-yard run (Dave Adams kick), 5:51. Falcons 41–20. Drive: 7 plays, 24 yards, 2:59.
- ARMY – Omari Thompson 86-yard punt return (Brendan Mullen kick), 4:16. Falcons 41–27.

Statistics	AF	ARMY
First downs	24	20
Total yards	441	367
Rushing yards	278	233
Passing yards	163	134
Turnovers	0	2
Time of possession	32:43	27:17

Team	Category	Player	Statistics
Air Force	Passing	Mike Thiessen	14/22, 163 yards
Air Force	Rushing	Scotty McKay	14 rushes, 100 yards, TD
Air Force	Receiving	Ryan Fleming	8 receptions, 96 yards
Army	Passing	Joe Gerena	15/32, 134 yards, 2 INT
Army	Rushing	Michael Wallace	23 rushes, 201 yards, 3 TD
Army	Receiving	Bryan Bowdish	3 receptions, 37 yards

=== At Louisville ===
Army Black Knights at Louisville Cardinals – Game summary

Quarter	1	2	3	4	Total
Black Knights	0	10	0	7	17
Cardinals	7	7	14	10	38

at Papa John's Cardinal Stadium, Louisville, Kentucky

- Date: November 11
- Game time: 2:00 p.m. EST
- Game weather: Partly sunny, 53 °F (12 °C)
- Game attendance: 40,328
- Referee: R. Gilbert
- Box score

Statistics	ARMY	LOU
First downs	16	20
Total yards	248	433
Rushing yards	137	126
Passing yards	111	307
Turnovers	0	2
Time of possession	37:38	22:22

Team	Category	Player	Statistics
Army	Passing	Chad Jenkins	10/25, 111 yards
Army	Rushing	Michael Wallace	21 rushes, 82 yards
Army	Receiving	Omari Thompson	6 receptions, 73 yards
Louisville	Passing	Dave Ragone	22/33, 290 yards, 3 TD, INT
Louisville	Rushing	Tony Stallings	11 rushes, 53 yards, 2 TD
Louisville	Receiving	Deion Branch	3 receptions, 71 yards, TD

=== UAB ===
UAB Blazers at Army Black Knights – Game summary

Quarter	1	2	3	4	Total
Blazers	7	3	7	10	27
Black Knights	0	7	0	0	7

at Michie Stadium, West Point, New York

- Date: November 18
- Game time: 12:00 p.m. EST
- Game weather: Cloudy, 41 °F (5 °C)
- Game attendance: 35,267
- Referee: R. Smith
- Box score

Statistics	UAB	ARMY
First downs	16	19
Total yards	427	263
Rushing yards	209	47
Passing yards	218	216
Turnovers	2	2
Time of possession	31:35	28:25

Team	Category	Player	Statistics
UAB	Passing	Jeff Aaron	14/28, 218 yards, TD, INT
UAB	Rushing	Percy Coleman	6 rushes, 83 yards
UAB	Receiving	Leron Little	2 receptions, 75 yards, TD
Army	Passing	Chad Jenkins	19/42, 169 yards, TD, INT
Army	Rushing	Josh Holden	13 rushes, 56 yards
Army	Receiving	Brian Bruenton	3 receptions, 58 yards

=== Vs. Navy ===
Army Black Knights vs. Navy Midshipmen – Game summary

Quarter	1	2	3	4	Total
Black Knights	7	0	7	14	28
Midshipmen	10	10	7	3	30

at PSINet Stadium

- Date: December 2
- Game time: 12:00 p.m. EST
- Game weather: Sunny, 35 °F (2 °C)
- Game attendance: 70,685
- Referee: Courtney Mauzy
- TV announcers (CBS): Verne Lundquist, Todd Blackledge, and Jill Arrington
- Box score

Game information
First quarter
- ARMY – Michael Wallace 65-yard run (Brendan Mullen kick), 12:44. Black Knights 7–0. Drive: 1 play, 65 yards, 0:10.
- NAVY – David Hills 23-yard field goal, 7:12. Black Knights 7–3. Drive: 12 plays, 72 yards, 5:32.
- NAVY – Brian Broadwater 45-yard run (David Hills kick), 2:53. Midshipmen 10–7. Drive: 6 plays, 71 yards, 4:14.

Second quarter

- NAVY – Brian Williams 32-yard pass from Brian Broadwater (David Hills kick), 11:24. Midshipmen 17–7. Drive: 10 plays, 66 yards, 4:21.
- NAVY – David Hills 32-yard field goal, 7:12. Midshipmen 20–7. Drive: 8 plays, 31 yards, 3:35.

Third quarter

- NAVY – Brad Wimsatt 3-yard fumble return (David Hills kick), 3:22. Midshipmen 27–7.
- ARMY – Ben Woodruff 6-yard blocked punt return (Brendan Mullen kick), 1:27. Midshipmen 27–14.

Fourth quarter

- ARMY – Brian Bruenton 23-yard pass from Curtis Zervic (Brendan Mullen kick), 8:57. Midshipmen 27–21. Drive: 5 plays, 32 yards, 1:33.
- NAVY – David Hills 27-yard field goal, 5:32. Midshipmen 30–21. Drive: 4 plays, 9 yards, 1:29.
- ARMY – Anthony Miller 21-yard pass from Curtis Zervic (Brendan Mullen kick), 2:44. Midshipmen 30–28. Drive: 10 plays, 56 yards, 2:48.

Statistics	ARMY	NAVY
First downs	15	20
Total yards	298	388
Rushing yards	153	300
Passing yards	145	88
Turnovers	5	2
Time of possession	19:53	40:07

Team	Category	Player	Statistics
Army	Passing	Curtis Zervic	9/15, 99 yards, 2 TD, INT
Army	Rushing	Michael Wallace	19 rushes, 159 yards, TD
Army	Receiving	Brian Bruenton	3 receptions, 40 yards, TD
Navy	Passing	Brian Broadwater	7/13, 88 yards, TD
Navy	Rushing	Brian Broadwater	24 rushes, 121 yards, TD
Navy	Receiving	Brian Williams	2 receptions, 38 yards, TD

== Roster ==
2000 Army Black Knights football team roster
Players
Coaches
Offense

Pos.	#	Name	Class
G	78	Mauricio Arguello	So
RB	39	Demetrius Ball	So
RB	28	Gary Bartels	So
RB	36	Omar Bilal	So
WR	13	Bryan Bowdish	Jr
WR	93	Brian Bruenton	So
C	64	Brandon Calhoun	Jr
WR	83	Charles Cannon	Jr
RB	29	Matt Capobianco	Sr
RB	20	Vaughn Carpenter	Sr
TE	84	Shaun Castillo	Sr
OT	74	Jared Churchill	So
RB	38	Adam Clements	So
WR	4	Bo Clift	Jr
FB	47	James Creason	So
C	58	Ira Crofford	So
G	53	Brian Demcher	Sr
TE	95	Mohamed Desoky	Jr
RB	22	Brandon Dickens	So
TE	80	Clint Dodson	So
FB	30	Joe Emigh	So

Defense

Pos.	#	Name	Class
DB	36	Alex Alston	So
DE	7	Graham Anderson	Fr
DT	77	Travis Ault	So
LB	65	Cody Beck	So
DE	99	Paul Benitez	So
NG	87	Dwayne Bernal	Jr
LB	50	John Bowman	So
DE	67	Jeff Bradley	Sr
DE	85	Josh Bundt	Sr
DB	22	Andrew Burke	Jr
DT	96	Craig Casey	So
LB	68	David Cibik	So
DB	17	Tony Coaxum	Sr
DE	62	Matt Cole	Jr
DB	5	Vince Colette	So
DB	14	Dan Colontrelle	So
DT	91	Melvin Crittle	Jr
NG	83	Chris Curran	So
DB	23	Clay Daniels	Sr
DB	21	Brent Dial	So
LB	64	Tom Duggan	Sr
DB	33	Imani Dupree	Jr
DB	9	Ben Edgar	Sr

Special teams

Pos.	#	Name	Class
P, K	10	James Bean	Sr
LS	64	Brandon Calhoun	Jr
LS	80	Clint Dodson	So
LS	82	Reid Finn	So
P	3	Dan MacElroy	So
K	1	Brendan Mullen	Jr
K	8	Matt Parker	Sr
P	13	Graham White	Sr

Head coach

- Todd Berry

Coordinators/assistant coaches

- John Bond
  Offensive coordinator/Quarterbacks
- Dennis Therrell
  Defensive coordinator
- John Mumford
  Defensive line

Legend

- (C) Team captain
- (S) Suspended
- (I) Ineligible
- Injured
- Redshirt

Roster
Last update: June 27, 2000
