= 2000 Galleryfurniture.com Bowl =

East Carolina Pirates	Texas Tech Red Raiders
(7–4)	(7–5)
Conference USA	Big 12
40	27
Head coach: Steve Logan	Head coach: Mike Leach
	1	2	3	4	Total
East Carolina	20	14	6	0	40
Texas Tech	0	7	7	13	27
- Date: December 27, 2000
- Season: 2000
- Stadium: Astrodome
- Location: Houston, Texas
- Referee: Bill LeMonnier (Big Ten)
- Attendance: 33,899
- Payout: US$750,000 per team

United States TV coverage
- Network: ESPN2
- Announcers: Dave Barnett, Mike Golic, Bill Curry, Michele Tafoya

The 2000 Galleryfurniture.com Bowl was a post-season college football bowl game between the Texas Tech Red Raiders from the Big 12 Conference and the East Carolina Pirates from Conference USA (C-USA) at the Astrodome in Houston, Texas on December 27, 2000. It was the inaugural game in the bowl's history. The game was the final competition of the 2000 football season for each team and resulted in 40–27 East Carolina victory.

== Teams ==
The bowl featured the East Carolina Pirates from Conference USA (C-USA) and the Texas Tech Red Raiders from the Big 12 Conference. This was the first meeting between the two teams.

=== East Carolina ===
The Pirates, led by ninth-year head coach Steve Logan, entered the game with a record of 7–4 (5–2 in C-USA play), finishing tied for second in the conference. This was the Pirates' second-straight bowl appearance, having played in the Mobile Alabama Bowl the previous season.

=== Texas Tech ===
The Red Raiders, led by first-year head coach Mike Leach, entered the game with a record of 7–5 (3–5 in Big 12 play), finishing fourth in the Big 12's South Division. Leach introduced a new, up-tempo, pass-heavy offense known as the air raid that saw starting quarterback Kliff Kingsbury attempt an average of 48.7 passes per game.

== Game summary ==
2000 Galleryfurniture.com Bowl

Quarter	1	2	3	4	Total
Pirates	20	14	6	0	40
Red Raiders	0	7	7	13	27

at Astrodome, Houston, Texas

- Date: Wednesday, December 27, 2000
- Game time: 7:00 p.m. CST
- Game weather: None (indoor stadium)
- Game attendance: 33,899
- Referee: Bill LeMonnier
- TV: ESPN
- Box score, Recap

Game information
First quarter
- ECU – David Garrard 6-yard run (kick blocked), 11:31. Pirates 6–0.
- ECU – Keith Stokes 71-yard punt return (Kevin Miller kick), 7:51. Pirates 13–0.
- ECU – Leonard Henry 1-yard run (Kevin Miller kick), 4:26. Pirates 20–0.

Second quarter

- ECU – Derrick Collier 44-yard pass from David Garrard (Kevin Miller kick), 14:16. Pirates 27–0.
- ECU – Leonard Henry 1-yard run (Kevin Miller kick), 4:27. Pirates 34–0.
- TTU – Derek Dorris 7-yard pass from Kliff Kingsbury (Chris Birkholz kick), 1:39. Pirates 34–7.

Third quarter

- TTU – Darrell Jones 65-yard pass from Kliff Kingsbury (Chris Birkholz kick), 13:11. Pirates 34–14.
- ECU – Kevin Miller 36-yard field goal, 8:44. Pirates 37–14.
- ECU – Kevin Miller 35-yard field goal, 3:52. Pirates 40–14.

Fourth quarter

- TTU – Cole Roberts 17-yard pass from Kliff Kingsbury (Chris Birkholz kick), 14:41. Pirates 40–21.
- TTU – Derek Dorris 3-yard pass from Kliff Kingsbury (pass failed), 6:44. Pirates 40–27.

Statistics	ECU	TTU
First downs	25	18
Total yards	481	369
Rushing yards	252	62
Passing yards	229	307
Turnovers	5	2
Time of possession	33:08	26:52

Team	Category	Player	Statistics
East Carolina	Passing	David Garrard	17/27, 229 yards, TD, 2 INT
East Carolina	Rushing	Leonard Henry	20 rushes, 92 yards, 2 TD
East Carolina	Receiving	Marcellus Harris	3 receptions, 76 yards
Texas Tech	Passing	Kliff Kingsbury	31/49, 307 yards, 4 TD, 2 INT
Texas Tech	Rushing	Ricky Williams	9 rushes, 55 yards
Texas Tech	Receiving	Darrell Jones	6 receptions, 147 yards, TD
