= 2000 Louisville Cardinals football team =

American college football season

2000 Louisville Cardinals football

C-USA champion

Liberty Bowl, L 17–22 vs. Colorado State
- Conference: Conference USA
- Record: 9–3 (6–1 C–USA)
- Head coach: John L. Smith (3rd season)
- Offensive coordinator: Scott Linehan (2nd season)
- Offensive scheme: Pro-style
- Defensive coordinator: Chris Smeland (3rd season)
- Base defense: 4–3
- Home stadium: Papa John's Cardinal Stadium

2000 Conference USA football standings
	Conf.			Overall
Team	W		L	W		L
Louisville $	6	–	1	9	–	3
East Carolina	5	–	2	8	–	4
Cincinnati	5	–	2	7	–	5
Southern Miss	4	–	3	8	–	4
UAB	3	–	3	7	–	4
Tulane	3	–	4	6	–	5
Memphis	2	–	5	4	–	7
Houston	2	–	5	3	–	8
Army	1	–	6	1	–	10
$ – Conference champion; Rankings from AP Poll

The 2000 Louisville Cardinals football team represented the University of Louisville as a member of Conference USA (C-USA) during the 2000 NCAA Division I-A football season. Led by third-year head coach John L. Smith, the Cardinals compiled an overall record of 9–3 with a mark of 6–1 in conference play, winning the C-USA title. Louisville was invited to the Liberty Bowl, where the Cardinals lost to Colorado State. The team played home game at Papa John's Cardinal Stadium in Louisville, Kentucky.

== Schedule ==
Date	Time	Opponent	Rank	Site	TV	Result	Attendance	Source
September 2	7:00 pm	Kentucky*		Papa John's Cardinal Stadium; Louisville, KY (Governor's Cup)	WDRB	W 40–34 ^{OT}	42,510	
September 9	7:00 pm	Grambling State*		Papa John's Cardinal Stadium; Louisville, KY	ESPN Plus	W 52–0	41,227	
September 23	6:00 pm	at No. 2 Florida State*		Doak Campbell Stadium; Tallahassee, FL	ESPN2	L 0–31	80,741	
September 30	7:00 pm	Connecticut		Papa John's Cardinal Stadium; Louisville, KY		W 41–22	38,121	
October 7	3:30 pm	at UAB		Legion Field; Birmingham, AL		W 38–17	18,000	
October 14	3:30 pm	Cincinnati		Papa John's Cardinal Stadium; Louisville, KY (The Keg of Nails)	FSN	W 38–24	39,233	
October 19	7:00 pm	East Carolina		Papa John's Cardinal Stadium; Louisville, KY	FSN	L 25–28	38,024	
October 28	2:00 pm	Tulane		Papa John's Cardinal Stadium; Louisville, KY		W 35–32	30,387	
November 4	3:30 pm	at No. 13 Southern Miss		M. M. Roberts Stadium; Hattiesburg, MS	FSN	W 49–28	31,667	
November 11	2:00 pm	Army		Papa John's Cardinal Stadium; Louisville, KY		W 38–17	40,328	
November 18	3:30 pm	at Houston		Robertson Stadium; Houston, TX		W 32–13	3,006	
December 29	1:30 pm	vs. No. 23 Colorado State*	No. 22	Liberty Bowl Memorial Stadium; Memphis, TN (Liberty Bowl)	ESPN	L 17–22	58,302	
*Non-conference game; Rankings from AP Poll released prior to the game; All times are in Eastern time

== Rankings ==
Ranking movements Legend: ██ Increase in ranking ██ Decrease in ranking — = Not ranked
	Week																
Poll	Pre	1	2	3	4	5	6	7	8	9	10	11	12	13	14	15	Final
AP	—	—	—	—	—	—	—	—	—	—	—	—	—	—	22	22	—
Coaches Poll	—	—	—	—	—	—	—	—	—	—	—	—	—	—	23	23	—
BCS	Not released									—	—	—	—	—	—	—	Not released

== Roster ==
2000 Louisville Cardinals football team roster
Players
Coaches
Offense

Pos.	#	Name	Class
WR	9	Deion Branch	Jr
WR	10	Arnold Jackson	Sr
QB	15	Dave Ragone	So
G	61	Aaron Dardzinski	Jr
OL	68	Dan Koons	Fr
OL	69	Jason Hilliard	Fr
OT	72	Ariel Rodriguez	So
C	73	Jason Padget	Sr
OL	74	Jason Weathers	Fr
OT	75	Scott Graham	Sr
OT	76	Rob Eble	Jr
G	77	Joe O'Shaughnessy	Sr
OL	78	Brian Devine	Fr
WR	80	Zek Parker	Sr
WR	84	Allen Carroll	Sr
WR	85	Tiger Jones	Fr

Defense

Pos.	#	Name	Class
CB	2	Rashad Holman	Sr
CB	3	Antonio Roundtree	Sr
S	12	Curry Burns	So
CB	24	Anthony Floyd	So
DT	79	Donovan Arp	Sr
DB	42	Laroni Gallishaw	Fr
DT	90	Scott Lopez	Fr
DE	92	Michael Josiah	So
DT	93	Tyrone Saterfield	Fr
DE	95	Devon Thomas	So
DT	96	Derrick Kennedy	Sr
DE	97	Toby Dawson	Sr
DE	98	Chad Lee	So
DE	99	Dewayne White	So

Special teams

Pos.	#	Name	Class
PK	13	Frank Zebich	Sr

Head coach

- John L. Smith

Coordinators/assistant coaches

- Mike Cox (LB)

Legend

- (C) Team captain
- (S) Suspended
- (I) Ineligible
- Injured
- Redshirt

Roster
Last update: 2000-12-16
