= 4–4 defense =

American football defensive formation

Base 4–4 defense

In American football, the 4–4 defense is a defensive alignment consisting of four down linemen and four linebackers.

Originally seen as a passing defense against the spread, modern versions of the 4-4 are attacking defenses stocked with multiple blitz packages that can easily be concealed and altered. The modern defense is based on speed, athleticism and intelligence rather than on size and strength. Versatility is key because players may have to change roles from one play to the next. A top priority of the 4–4 defense is stopping the run by keeping eight men close to the line of scrimmage. This also makes it difficult for the offense to identify where the pressure comes from when the defense blitzes.

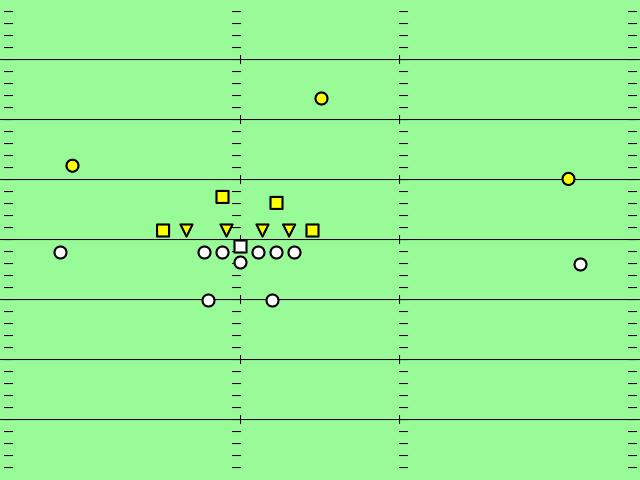
4-4 front, Virginia Tech defense, G front.

== History ==
Four man fronts are seen in the 1940s as ad hoc ways to deal with the "Bears" T, as the result of two linemen dropping off from the 6-2 of the time into short zones, and later as a prepared defense for use against the spread offenses of the time. In the 1950s, the six man line was no longer seen in the pros as a base defense, and the wide tackle six evolved to handle the interior attack of the Power T, and the outside threats of the Split T. To deal with flankers and split ends, contain theories such as the "five spoke" contain were developed, where the defensive ends became much like outside linebackers and had pass defense responsibilities. Homer Smith, in his history of 8 man lines, shows formations starting with the 1940s style 6-2, changing into the wide tackle six, and eventually, six man lines becoming 4 man lines as the defensive ends were relabeled outside linebackers. This change is similar to the defensive ends of the 5-2 being relabeled the outside linebackers of the 3-4.

== Defensive tackles ==
Requirements for defensive tackles are highly dependent on the version of the defense being played. For example, the 4-4 of Joe Roman requires quickness, size, and a player no taller than 6' 4". In the 4-4 Split of Roman, the defensive tackles line up heads up on the offensive guard, or perhaps on their outside shoulder. In the 'G front' of Frank Beamer's teams, the weak side tackle lines up on the inside shoulder of the offensive guard, and the strong side tackle lines up on the outside shoulder of the offensive guard.

== Defensive ends ==
Requirements for defensive ends are highly dependent on the version of the defense being played. Speed and height are often valued, and defensive ends in these systems are often converted linebackers. Though alignment is highly dependent on the front, weak side ends are often outside the offensive tackle, and strong side ends outside the shoulder of the tight end. In the 'G front' of Virginia Tech, the Sam linebacker and the end switch positions, with the end assuming a position just inside the shoulder of the tight end, and the Sam linebacker staying wide of the end, along the line.

== Inside linebackers ==
There are two inside linebackers in the 4–4 scheme sometimes known as the Mike and Buck linebackers. Where and how they play, and personnel types preferred, are highly scheme dependent. At least one of these linebackers assumes substantial pass coverage responsibilities.

== Outside linebackers ==
As there are two inside linebackers, there are also two outside linebackers. These outside backers can be described generically as the Sam and Will positions. The Sam linebacker typically sticks to the strong side, often outside the strong side defensive end, and has substantial pass coverage responsibilities. The Will position will generally play on the weak side. However, the Will can be moved to just about anywhere to better suit the defensive call or adjustment. Depending on the call and the personnel in place, Will’s job could be purely to get after the quarterback, play at linebacker depth, or to drop into coverage.

The nature of the defense requires a great deal of athleticism from these positions. Roman describes the Sam as the most difficult linebacking position to fill in his defense, and describes the Will as a strong safety type. In the defenses of Virginia Tech, Sam is compared to a cornerback, and Will to a free safety, in terms of the personnel types preferred for this role.

== Secondary ==
The cornerbacks are often on islands in man coverage or in a deep zone, and they need to possess speed and change of direction skills. They also need to be smart when diagnosing the play and when in zone coverage, must be able to play the ball. The corners will generally line up several yards off the ball. The safety in the 4–4 defense should be one of the team’s best athletes. The safety needs to be fast enough to play in coverage, diagnose plays well, and hit like a linebacker. The safety will usually be assigned to the deep middle of the field, but can also be blitzed in various packages.

== Usage ==
=== 4–4 base alignment ===
There are teams that line up in a 4–4 as a base. An example are the Virginia Tech teams of Frank Beamer and Justin Fuente, with Bud Foster serving as defensive coordinator under both. Another eight man front with four down linemen (most of the time) were "Erk" Russell's Junkyard Dog defense at Georgia under Vince Dooley. Russell later took this defense to Georgia Southern when he was the Eagles' head coach. Dennis Therrell used a base 4–4 while serving as the defensive coordinator for the Army Black Knights in the early 2000s.

=== 4–3 monster alignments and other hybrids ===
The other form of a 4-4 is seen in teams that use a 4-3 base set along with an overshifted secondary. Instead of two cornerbacks and two safeties, these teams use two cornerbacks, one free safety, and one monster or rover back. This monster is a hybrid, who can play linebacker techniques when needed or pass protection when needed. An example of this approach is seen in the Eagle defense of Ron Vanderlinden, who was a defensive coordinator at Penn State.

While serving as the defensive coordinator for Texas Tech and Kentucky, John Goodner ran a 4–2–5/4–4 hybrid defense.

== Bibliography ==
Arnsparger, Bill, Armsparger's Coaching Defensive Football, St Lucie Press, 1999.

Beamer, Frank and Clark, Michael, Pressuring Without Risk in Defensive Football Strategies, American Football Coaches Association, 2000

Bible, Dana X. Championship Football, Prentice-Hall, 1947.

Foster, Bud, Cavanaugh, Jim, West, Lou and Wiles, Charlie Virginia Tech's Attack Defense in Proceedings, 76th AFCA Convention, American Football College Association, 1999.

Johnston, James W., The Wow Boys, University of Nebraska Press, 2006.

Jones, Gomer, and Wilkinson, Bud, Modern Defensive Football, Prentice-Hall, 1957.

Roman, Joe, The Complete Guide to Installing the 44 Split Defense, Coaches Choice, 1999.

Russell, Erskine, Eliminating Options With the Junkyard Eight in Defensive Football Strategies, American Football Coaches Association, 2000.

Smith, Homer, Football Coach's Complete Offensive Playbook, Parker Publishing, 1987, Chapter 1.

Vanderlinden, Ron, Football's Eagle and Stack Defenses, Human Kinetics, 2008.
