= 2000 Houston Cougars football team =

American college football season

2000 Houston Cougars football
- Conference: Conference USA
- Record: 3–8 (2–5 C-USA)
- Head coach: Dana Dimel (1st season)
- Offensive coordinator: Phil Davis (1st season)
- Offensive scheme: Spread
- Co-defensive coordinators: Dick Bumpas (2nd season); Mark Stoops (1st season)
- Base defense: 4–3
- Captains: Jason McKinley; Mike Clark; Wayne Rogers; Josh Lovelady
- Home stadium: Robertson Stadium

2000 Conference USA football standings
	Conf.			Overall
Team	W		L	W		L
Louisville $	6	–	1	9	–	3
East Carolina	5	–	2	8	–	4
Cincinnati	5	–	2	7	–	5
Southern Miss	4	–	3	8	–	4
UAB	3	–	3	7	–	4
Tulane	3	–	4	6	–	5
Memphis	2	–	5	4	–	7
Houston	2	–	5	3	–	8
Army	1	–	6	1	–	10
$ – Conference champion; Rankings from AP Poll

The 2000 Houston Cougars football team represented the University of Houston as a member of Conference USA (C-USA) during the 2000 NCAA Division I-A football season. Led by first-year head coach Dana Dimel, the Cougars compiled an overall record of 3–8 with a mark of 2–5 in conference play, tying for seventh place in C-USA. The team played home games on campus, at Robertson Stadium in Houston.

== Schedule ==
Date	Time	Opponent	Site	TV	Result	Attendance	Source
September 2	7:00 pm	at Rice*	Rice Stadium; Houston, TX (rivalry)		L 27–30 ^{OT}	40,714	
September 9	7:00 pm	at LSU*	Tiger Stadium; Baton Rouge, LA		L 13–28	82,469	
September 16	7:00 pm	Army	Robertson Stadium; Houston, TX		W 31–30	25,112	
September 23	6:00 pm	at No. 15 Texas*	Darrell K Royal–Texas Memorial Stadium; Austin, TX	FSN	L 0–48	81,592	
September 30	7:00 pm	SMU*	Robertson Stadium; Houston, TX (rivalry)		W 17–15	17,496	
October 7	11:00 am	at Cincinnati	Nippert Stadium; Cincinnati, OH	ESPN Plus	L 31–48	17,647	
October 21	7:00 pm	at Memphis	Liberty Bowl Memorial Stadium; Memphis, TN		W 33–30 ^{3OT}	26,662	
October 28	2:30 pm	No. 14 Southern Miss^{†}	Robertson Stadium; Houston, TX		L 3–6	17,565	
November 4	5:00 pm	at Tulane	Louisiana Superdome; New Orleans, LA		L 23–41	16,785	
November 11	11:00 am	at East Carolina	Dowdy–Ficklen Stadium; Greenville, NC	FSN	L 20–62	33,339	
November 18	2:30 pm	Louisville	Robertson Stadium; Houston, TX		L 13–32	3,006	
*Non-conference game; ^{†}Homecoming; Rankings from AP Poll released prior to the game; All times are in Central time

== Roster ==
2000 Houston Cougars football team roster
Players
Coaches
Offense

Pos.	#	Name	Class
RB	1	Joffrey Reynolds	So
WR	12	Jerrian James	Sr
QB	13	John Nicholson	Fr
WR	14	Damien Montgomery	Sr
QB	15	Bubba Teague	Fr
QB	16	Jason McKinley	Sr
WR	46	Harrison Arceneaux	Fr
OT	71	Josh Lovelady	Sr
OL	76	Rex Hadnot	Fr
OL	77	Patrick Boatner	Jr
OL	79	Jabari Beauford	Jr
WR	80	Ethan Ross	Jr
TE	80	Jarvis Cooper	Fr
TE	81	Travis Griffith	Fr
WR	82	Brian Robinson	So
WR	83	KeyKowa Bell	Jr
WR	84	Choni Francis	Fr
TE	85	Stephen Cucci	So
WR	86	Mark Hopkins	Fr
TE	87	Jonathan Pritchett	Jr

Defense

Pos.	#	Name	Class
S	5	Hanik Milligan	So
DB	22	Emile White	Sr
DB	24	Jason Parker	Jr
DB	25	Jesse Grove	Fr
DB	26	Reggie Medlock	So
DB	27	Frederick Conley	Sr
DB	28	Marcus Smith	Sr
DL	91	Nikia Adderston	Sr
DL	92	Adrian Lee	Jr
DL	93	Josh Tubbs	Fr
DL	94	Kevin Payne	Jr
DL	95	Bryan Hill	Jr
DL	96	Robin Tremblay	Jr
DL	97	Ryan Alvey	Jr
DL	98	Rufus Williams	Jr
DL	99	Adrian Guerra	Fr

Special teams

Pos.	#	Name	Class
P	48	Jeff Patterson	Sr

Head coach

- Dana Dimel

Coordinators/assistant coaches

- D. J. Eliot – Graduate assistant

Legend

- (C) Team captain
- (S) Suspended
- (I) Ineligible
- Injured
- Redshirt

Roster
Last update: 2000-08-17
