= David Garrard =

American football player (born 1978)

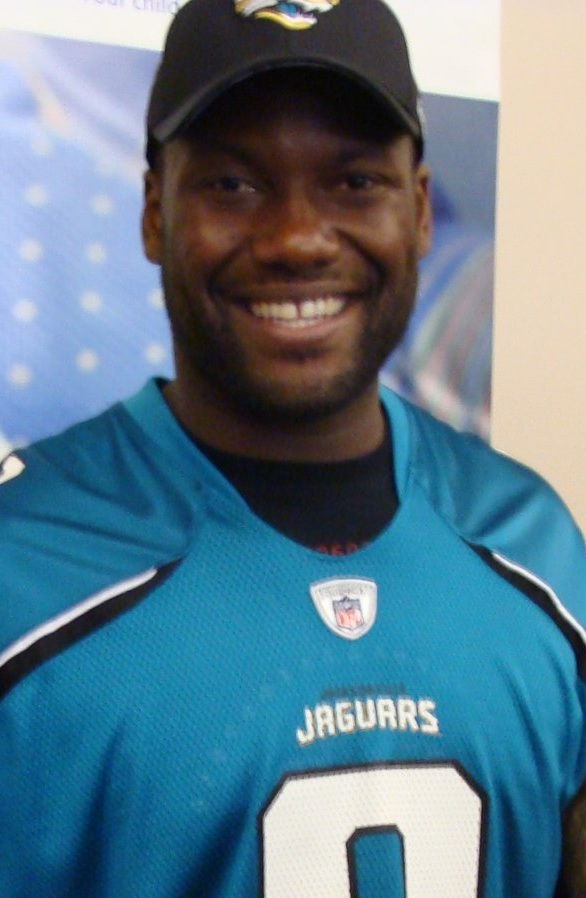
- Garrard with the Jacksonville Jaguars

No. 9, 4
- Position: Quarterback

Personal information
- Born: February 14, 1978 (age 48); East Orange, New Jersey, U.S.
- Listed height: 6 ft 2 in (1.88 m)
- Listed weight: 236 lb (107 kg)

Career information
- High school: Southern Durham (Durham, North Carolina)
- College: East Carolina (1997–2001)
- NFL draft: 2002: 4th round, 108th overall pick

Career history
- Jacksonville Jaguars (2002–2010); Miami Dolphins (2012)*; New York Jets (2013)
- * Offseason or practice squad member only

Awards and highlights
- Pro Bowl (2009); 3× Second-team All-C-USA (1999–2001)

Career NFL statistics
- Passing attempts: 2,281
- Passing completions: 1,406
- Completion percentage: 61.6%
- TD–INT: 89–54
- Passing yards: 16,003
- Passer rating: 85.8
- Rushing yards: 1,746
- Rushing touchdowns: 17
- Stats at Pro Football Reference

David Douglas Garrard (born February 14, 1978) is an American former professional football player who was a quarterback in the National Football League (NFL) for nine seasons with the Jacksonville Jaguars. He played college football for the East Carolina Pirates and was selected by the Jaguars in the fourth round of the 2002 NFL draft. Garrard became the team's starter in 2007 and led them to their first playoff win since 1999. He also earned Pro Bowl honors in 2009. Following his release from Jacksonville, Garrard spent one season as a backup with the New York Jets.

== Early life ==
Garrard was born in East Orange, New Jersey, and grew up in Durham, North Carolina. When he was fourteen his mother died of breast cancer. When he began his professional career he created The David Garrard Foundation to promote breast cancer awareness and research.

Garrard attended Southern High School in Durham, where he was named an All-America choice by Prep Stars and rated the best high school quarterback in North Carolina. Veteran high school coaches in North Carolina said Garrard possessed one of the strongest arms they had ever seen and compared Garrard to former NFL quarterback and North Carolina native Roman Gabriel.

== College career ==
Garrard attended East Carolina University, where he played for the Pirates. Although physically larger than most quarterbacks at more than 240 pounds, Garrard displayed exceptional mobility. Former East Carolina head football coach Steve Logan compared the experience of tackling Garrard to "getting hit by a beer truck." Garrard also proved durable, starting every game for the Pirates in the 1999, 2000, and 2001 seasons.

In Garrard's sophomore season, he led the Pirates to a 9–3 record with victories over the West Virginia Mountaineers, South Carolina Gamecocks, Miami Hurricanes, and North Carolina State Wolfpack. In the fourth game of the season against Miami, East Carolina came back from a 20–3 deficit to defeat the 13th-ranked Miami Hurricanes, 27–23. Garrard threw a 27-yard touchdown pass to Keith Stokes for the go-ahead score in the final minutes of the game. ECU was unable to play the scheduled home game at Dowdy–Ficklen Stadium on its campus in Greenville, NC, because Hurricane Floyd had ravaged the eastern part of the state the prior week. The hurricane also prevented the Pirates from returning to Greenville following a road victory against South Carolina, leaving ECU's football team stranded in Columbia, SC. East Carolina moved the game against Miami to Carter–Finley Stadium in Raleigh. The victory propelled ECU into the Associated Press college football poll's top 25. The Pirates spent eleven weeks ranked in the AP poll, climbed to as high as 16th in the poll, and finished the regular season ranked 20th. East Carolina dropped out of the top 25 to 27th in the voting after losing 28–14 in the 1999 Mobile Alabama Bowl to Texas Christian University and the Horned Frogs' star running back, LaDainian Tomlinson.

ECU finished 8–4 in Garrard's junior season. Garrard capped the season by throwing an unbelievable touchdown and rushing for another acrobatic touchdown in a 40–27 victory against Texas Tech in the Galleryfurniture.com Bowl. Garrard's senior season began with high expectations but ended in disappointment. Although East Carolina averaged more than 35 points per game in 2001, the Pirates finished the season with a 6–6 record.

Ironically, the final game of Garrard's college career pitted him against Marshall University and its starting quarterback, Byron Leftwich, in the 2001 GMAC Bowl. Garrard and Leftwich would eventually be teammates with the Jacksonville Jaguars and compete for the team's starting quarterback position. In the highest-scoring bowl game in college football history to that point, Leftwich brought Marshall back from a thirty-point deficit to defeat Garrard's East Carolina Pirates 64–61 in double-overtime.

Garrard broke 28 school passing and offensive records at East Carolina and joined a select few quarterbacks who achieved more than 9000 passing yards and 1000 rushing yards in their collegiate careers.

Garrard went on to graduate from East Carolina University in 2001 with a degree in Construction Management.

== Professional career ==
Pre-draft measurables
| Height | Weight | Arm length | Hand span | 40-yard dash | 10-yard split | 20-yard split | 20-yard shuttle | Three-cone drill | Vertical jump | Broad jump | Wonderlic |
|---|---|---|---|---|---|---|---|---|---|---|---|
| 6 ft 1 7/8 in (1.88 m) | 235 lb (107 kg) | 31 in (0.79 m) | 10 1/2 in (0.27 m) | 4.82 s | 1.69 s | 2.76 s | 3.87 s | 6.75 s | 33.5 in (0.85 m) | 9 ft 3 in (2.82 m) | 14 |
All values were taken from the NFL Scouting Combine and published in the NFL's scouting report.

=== Jacksonville Jaguars ===
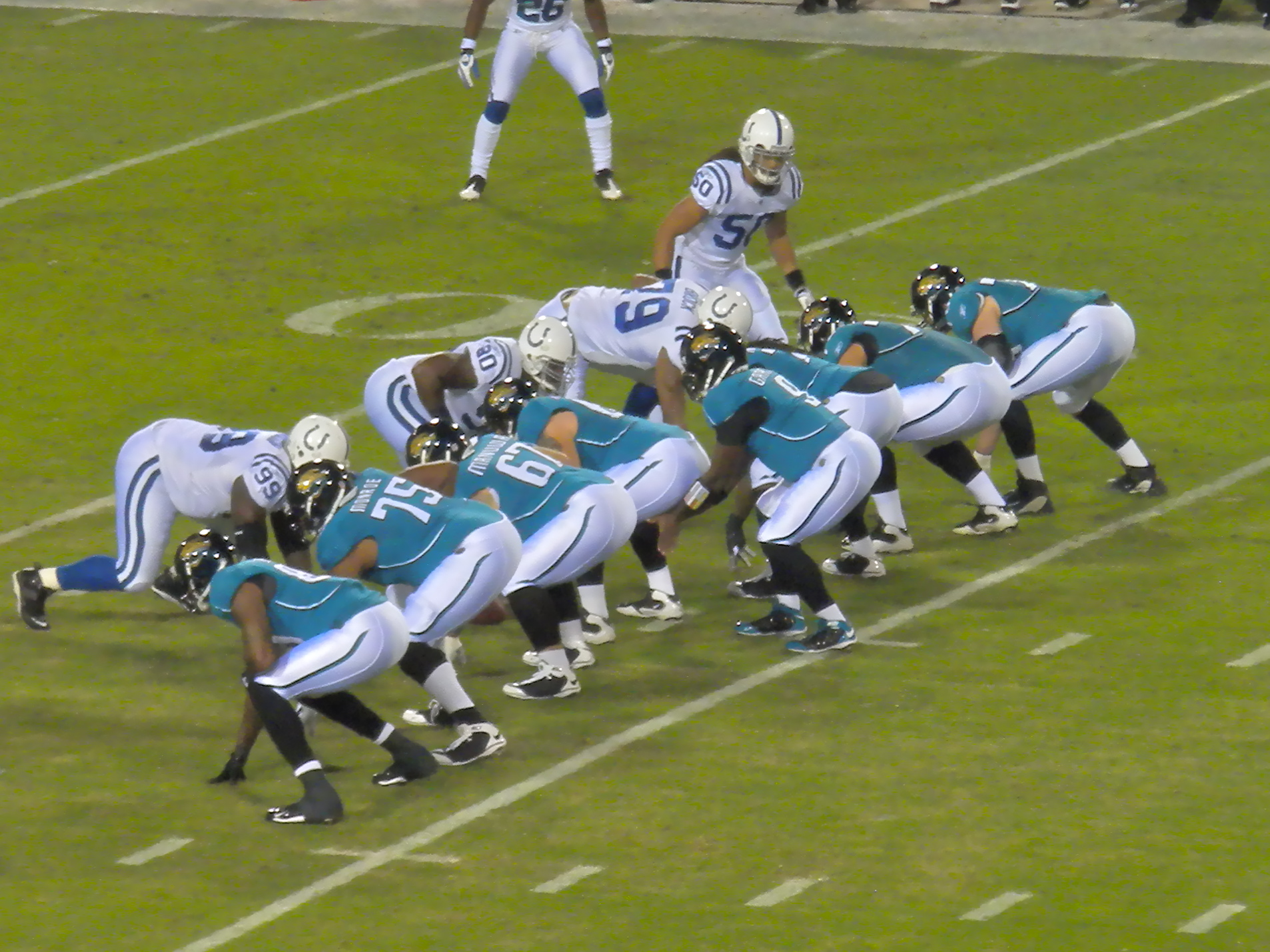
Garrard under center against the Indianapolis Colts in 2009.

Garrard was selected by the Jacksonville Jaguars in the fourth round, with the 108th overall pick, of the 2002 draft. Head coach Tom Coughlin saw him as the eventual successor to starting quarterback Mark Brunell. Coughlin however was fired following the 2002 season, and the team drafted quarterback Byron Leftwich with the seventh overall pick in the 2003 NFL draft. Leftwich replaced an injured Brunell midway through the 2003 season, and Garrard continued to serve as the team's backup.

Garrard was diagnosed with Crohn's disease in January 2004, and underwent treatment. Despite having surgery to remove a nearly 12-inch portion of his intestines in June, Garrard was healthy to start the 2004 season. His only start of the season came in Week 9 against Detroit when Leftwich was injured; he threw two touchdowns to zero interceptions, with his second touchdown coming in overtime to win the game.

In week 12 of the 2005 season, Leftwich was injured on the first play of the game and ruled out the rest of the regular season. Garrard led the Jaguars on a 5–1 run through their final six games to secure a playoff berth. He threw for 1,117 yards, 4 touchdowns, 1 interception for an 83.9 quarterback rating, and his lone loss came against the then–undefeated Indianapolis Colts. Leftwich then returned as the starter for the AFC Wild Card game, in which the Jaguars suffered a 28–3 loss to the New England Patriots.

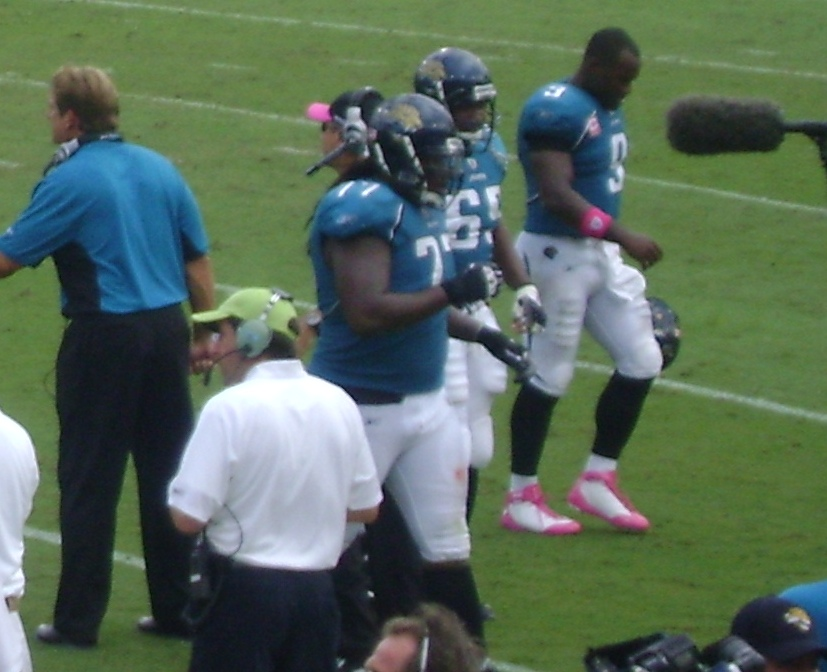
Garrard (far right, #9) with the Jaguars).

In 2006, Garrard was named the starter in Week 8 and replaced Leftwich for the remainder of the season. Through his first seven games as starter, Garrard led Jacksonville to a 5–2 record, leading to speculation that the Jaguars might seek to replace Leftwich permanently with Garrard. He lost his final three starts however, and the Jaguars missed the playoffs.

Entering the 2007 season, Jack Del Rio attempted to avoid a quarterback controversy by naming Leftwich the team's unconditional starting quarterback. However, Garrard outplayed Leftwich in the preseason, and Del Rio named him the starting quarterback on August 31, 2007. The Jaguars released Leftwich the next day.

In his first season as the team's starting quarterback, Garrard led the Jaguars to a 10–2 record and threw for 18 touchdowns and 2,509 yards in 12 games (he missed 3 games with a sprained ankle and sat out the season finale with the rest of their starters). He threw just three interceptions on the year, which gave him a quarterback rating of 102.2.

On January 5, 2008, In the AFC Wild Card, Garrard led his team to a 31–29 victory over the Pittsburgh Steelers. Down 29–28 with 1:56 to go, he led his team in a field goal-scoring drive highlighted by a 32-yard run on 4th and 2 that eventually set up the game-winning field goal for the Jaguars.

On January 12, 2008, In the AFC Divisional Round, Garrard set franchise records with 22 completions and 278 yards, along with 2 touchdowns and 1 interception against the unbeaten New England Patriots. However, the Patriots won the game, 31–20.

On April 7, 2008, it was announced that the Jaguars and Garrard had agreed to a contract extension, worth $60 million for 6 years.

Garrard played in all 16 games in both the 2008 and 2009 seasons, but the Jaguars only managed 5–11 and 7–9 records respectively. The team slumped behind multiple injuries to their offensive line, and new GM Gene Smith ushering in a "rebuilding era."

Garrard was named to the 2009 Pro Bowl, and finished the game with 183 yards and a touchdown in the AFC's win. He followed up his Pro Bowl appearance throwing for 23 touchdowns, 2,734 yards, a quarterback rating of 91 and an 8–6 record in 14 games in the 2010 season. In week 8, he completed 17 of 21 passes for 260 yards (a franchise record 12.4 average), four touchdowns, zero interceptions, a franchise record 157.8 rating, and rushed for a fifth score in a 35–17 win over the Cowboys.

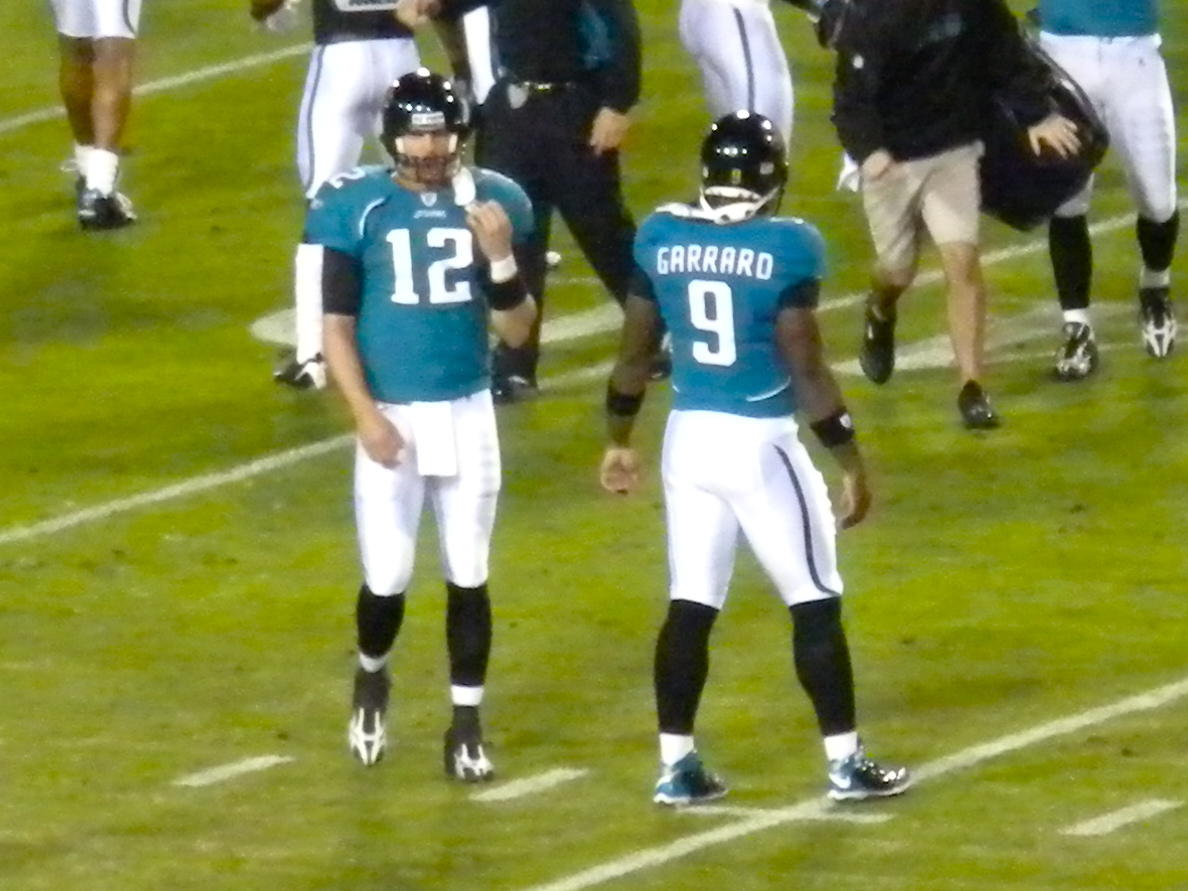
Garrard (right) and Luke McCown in 2009

Despite his Pro Bowl selection and a comeback year, Jacksonville drafted Missouri quarterback Blaine Gabbert with their first round draft pick. Though Del Rio insisted Garrard would remain the team's starting quarterback, he was released by Jacksonville on September 6, 2011, less than a week before the start of the regular season.

After his release from Jacksonville, Garrard received interest from the Colts, Dolphins and Raiders. He instead decided to use his time off to have surgery on his herniated disk and prepare himself for the 2012 season.

=== Miami Dolphins ===
On March 19, 2012, Garrard agreed to terms with the Miami Dolphins on a one-year contract, and was assumed to be the team's starting quarterback for the year. On August 11, Garrard had arthroscopic knee surgery and was ruled out of all four preseason games. The Dolphins released Garrard on September 4, 2012.

=== New York Jets ===
The New York Jets announced that they had signed a contract with Garrard on March 11, 2013. Garrard announced his intention to retire on May 15, 2013, as consistent knee swelling impaired his ability to play. The Jets placed Garrard on the reserve/retired list on May 30, 2013.

After resting his knee, Garrard decided to make a comeback and the Jets agreed to allow Garrard to come back on October 10, 2013. He was placed on the exempt list for two weeks. He was activated on October 21, 2013.

=== Retirement ===
On May 8, 2015, Garrard signed a contract with the Jaguars to officially retire as a member of the team.

== Career statistics ==
=== NFL ===
Legend
| | Led the league |
| **Bold** | Career high |

==== Regular season ====
| Year | Team | Games | | | Passing | | | | | | | | | Rushing | | | | | Sacks | | Fumbles | |
| Year | Team | GP | GS | Record | Cmp | Att | Pct | Yds | Avg | Lng | TD | Int | Rtg | Att | Yds | Avg | Lng | TD | Sck | SckY | Fum | Lost |
|---|---|---|---|---|---|---|---|---|---|---|---|---|---|---|---|---|---|---|---|---|---|---|
| 2002 | JAX | 4 | 1 | 0–1 | 23 | 46 | 50.0 | 231 | 5.0 | 22 | 1 | 2 | 53.8 | 25 | 139 | 5.6 | **41** | 2 | 7 | 40 | 1 | 1 |
| 2003 | JAX | 2 | 0 | – | 9 | 12 | **75.0** | 86 | 7.2 | 28 | 1 | 0 | **122.2** | 0 | 0 | 0.0 | 0 | 0 | 0 | 0 | 0 | 0 |
| 2004 | JAX | 4 | 2 | 1–1 | 38 | 72 | 52.8 | 374 | 5.2 | 36 | 2 | 1 | 71.2 | 12 | 76 | **6.3** | 12 | 1 | 6 | 35 | 0 | 0 |
| 2005 | JAX | 7 | 5 | **4–1** | 98 | 168 | 58.3 | 1,117 | 6.6 | 37 | 4 | 1 | 83.9 | 31 | 172 | 5.5 | 28 | 3 | 8 | 45 | 4 | 1 |
| 2006 | JAX | 11 | 10 | 5–5 | 145 | 241 | 60.2 | 1,735 | 7.2 | 49 | 10 | 9 | 80.5 | 47 | 250 | 5.3 | 20 | 0 | 20 | 119 | 4 | 2 |
| 2007 | JAX | 12 | 12 | 9–3 | 208 | 325 | 64.0 | 2,509 | **7.7** | 59 | 18 | 3 | 102.2 | 49 | 185 | 3.8 | 19 | 1 | 21 | 99 | 3 | 2 |
| 2008 | JAX | **16** | **16** | 5–11 | **335** | **535** | 62.6 | **3,620** | 6.8 | 41 | 15 | 13 | 81.7 | 73 | 322 | 4.4 | 24 | 2 | **42** | **288** | 7 | 3 |
| 2009 | JAX | **16** | **16** | 7–9 | 314 | 516 | 60.9 | 3,597 | 7.0 | 63 | 15 | 10 | 83.5 | **77** | **323** | 4.2 | 30 | 3 | **42** | 236 | **14** | **8** |
| 2010 | JAX | 14 | 14 | 8–6 | 236 | 366 | 64.5 | 2,734 | 7.5 | **75** | **23** | **15** | 90.8 | 66 | 279 | 4.2 | 25 | **5** | 33 | 253 | 11 | 4 |
| Career | | 86 | 76 | 39–37 | 1,406 | 2,281 | 61.6 | 16,003 | 7.0 | 75 | 89 | 54 | 85.8 | 380 | 1,746 | 4.6 | 41 | 17 | 179 | 1,115 | 44 | 21 |

==== Postseason ====
| Year | Team | Games | | | Passing | | | | | | | | | Rushing | | | | | Sacks | | Fumbles | |
| Year | Team | GP | GS | Record | Cmp | Att | Pct | Yds | Avg | Lng | TD | Int | Rtg | Att | Yds | Avg | Lng | TD | Sck | SckY | Fum | Lost |
|---|---|---|---|---|---|---|---|---|---|---|---|---|---|---|---|---|---|---|---|---|---|---|
| 2005 | JAX | 1 | 0 | – | 3 | 8 | 37.5 | 68 | **8.5** | 41 | 0 | 0 | 68.7 | 2 | 14 | 7.0 | 9 | 0 | 2 | 12 | 0 | 0 |
| 2007 | JAX | **2** | **2** | **1–1** | **31** | **54** | **57.4** | **418** | 7.7 | **43** | **3** | **3** | **77.5** | **8** | **72** | **9.0** | **32** | 0 | **5** | **44** | **1** | **1** |
| Career | | 3 | 2 | 1–1 | 34 | 62 | 54.8 | 486 | 7.8 | 43 | 3 | 3 | 76.4 | 10 | 86 | 8.6 | 32 | 0 | 7 | 56 | 1 | 1 |

=== College ===
| Season | Team | Games | | | Passing | | | | | | | | Rushing | | | |
| Season | Team | GP | GS | Record | Cmp | Att | Pct | Yds | Avg | TD | Int | Rtg | Att | Yds | Avg | TD |
|---|---|---|---|---|---|---|---|---|---|---|---|---|---|---|---|---|
| 1997 | East Carolina | Redshirt (redshirt) | | | | | | | | | | | | | | |
| 1998 | East Carolina | 11 | 6 | 3−3 | 157 | 255 | **61.6** | 2,091 | **8.2** | 14 | 7 | **143.1** | 127 | 164 | 1.3 | 2 |
| 1999 | East Carolina | **12** | **12** | **9−3** | **181** | **312** | 58.0 | **2,359** | 7.6 | 14 | **12** | 128.6 | **138** | **493** | **3.6** | **8** |
| 2000 | East Carolina | **12** | **12** | 8−4 | 164 | **312** | 52.6 | 2,332 | 7.5 | **19** | 11 | 128.4 | 135 | 358 | 2.7 | 5 |
| 2001 | East Carolina | **12** | **12** | 6−6 | 164 | 290 | 56.6 | 2,247 | 7.7 | 13 | 9 | 130.2 | 116 | 194 | 1.7 | 6 |
| Career | | 47 | 42 | 26−16 | 666 | 1,169 | 57.0 | 9,029 | 7.7 | 60 | 39 | 132.1 | 516 | 1,209 | 2.3 | 21 |

== Career highlights ==
- Pro Bowl (2009)
- 3× Second-team All-C-USA (1999–2001)

Franchise records

As of July 2020, Garrard held multiple Jaguars franchise records, including:

- Passer rating: career (85.8), season (102.2 in 2007), game (157.8 on October 31, 2010 @DAL)
- Sacked: playoff season (5 in 2007; with Mark Brunell (1999) and Blake Bortles (2017)), playoff game (4 on January 5, 2008 @PIT)
- Yards per attempt: playoffs (7.84), playoff season (7.74 in 2007)

== Personal life ==
Garrard proposed to his girlfriend Mary Knox before a 2002 Jaguars preseason game; the proposal was broadcast on the stadium's JumboTron. The couple were married in February 2003 and have three children.

Garrard suffers from Crohn's disease and has appeared in television commercials regarding treating the illness. He has spoken to children about living with Crohn's disease at the Painted Turtle Camp, a camp for children with disorders.

Garrard has also appeared in a Zaxby's commercial. Garrard has also been the spokesman for 121 Financial Credit Union (formerly Florida Telco Credit Union) since 2007.

Garrard is a Christian. He spoke about his faith saying "Having Jesus Christ as my Lord and Savior gives me so much peace. It’s still tough. It’s still hard sometimes, but you always can count on the Lord to be there for you, to never leave you, to never forsake you."
