= 2000 Cincinnati Bearcats football team =

American college football season

2000 Cincinnati Bearcats football

Motor City Bowl, L 14–25 vs. Marshall
- Conference: Conference USA
- Record: 7–5 (5–2 C-USA)
- Head coach: Rick Minter (7th season)
- Offensive coordinator: Joe Daniels (1st season)
- Offensive scheme: Multiple
- Defensive coordinator: Rick Smith (2nd season)
- Base defense: 4–3
- Home stadium: Nippert Stadium

2000 Conference USA football standings
	Conf.			Overall
Team	W		L	W		L
Louisville $	6	–	1	9	–	3
East Carolina	5	–	2	8	–	4
Cincinnati	5	–	2	7	–	5
Southern Miss	4	–	3	8	–	4
UAB	3	–	3	7	–	4
Tulane	3	–	4	6	–	5
Memphis	2	–	5	4	–	7
Houston	2	–	5	3	–	8
Army	1	–	6	1	–	10
$ – Conference champion; Rankings from AP Poll

The 2000 Cincinnati Bearcats football team represented the University of Cincinnati in the 2000 NCAA Division I-A football season. The team, coached by Rick Minter, played its home games in Nippert Stadium, as it has since 1924.

== Schedule ==
Date	Time	Opponent	Site	TV	Result	Attendance	Source
September 4	4:30 p.m.	Army	Nippert Stadium; Cincinnati, OH	FSN	W 23–17	23,311	
September 9	3:30 p.m.	Syracuse*	Nippert Stadium; Cincinnati, OH	FSN	W 12–10	17,717	
September 16	2:00 p.m.	at No. 4 Wisconsin*	Camp Randall Stadium; Madison, WI		L 25–28 ^{OT}	78,749	
September 23	2:00 p.m.	at Indiana*	Memorial Stadium; Bloomington, IN		L 6–42	30,075	
September 30	6:00 p.m.	at Tulane	Louisiana Superdome; New Orleans, LA		L 19–24	22,446	
October 7	12:00 p.m.	Houston	Nippert Stadium; Cincinnati, OH	ESPN Plus	W 48–31	17,647	
October 14	3:30 p.m.	at Louisville	Papa John's Cardinal Stadium; Louisville, KY (The Keg of Nails)	FSN	L 24–38	39,233	
October 28	2:00 p.m.	Miami (OH)*	Nippert Stadium; Cincinnati, OH (Victory Bell)	ESPN Plus	W 45–15	32,924	
November 4	1:00 p.m.	UAB	Nippert Stadium; Cincinnati, OH		W 33–21	19,851	
November 11	2:00 p.m.	at Memphis	Liberty Bowl Memorial Stadium; Memphis, TN (rivalry)		W 13–10	21,862	
November 18	1:00 p.m.	No. 24 Southern Miss	Nippert Stadium; Cincinnati, OH		W 27–24	21,958	
December 27	4:00 p.m.	vs. Marshall*	Pontiac Silverdome; Pontiac, MI (Motor City Bowl)	ESPN	L 14–25	52,911	
*Non-conference game; Rankings from AP Poll released prior to the game; All times are in Eastern time

== Roster ==
2000 Cincinnati Bearcats football team roster
Players
Coaches
Offense

Pos.	#	Name	Class
WR	1	Antonio Chatman	Sr
WR	2	Jason Collins-Baker	Sr
WR	3	Tye Keith	So
QB	7	Deontey Kenner	Sr
RB	33	Ray Jackson	Jr
OT	77	Mike Love	Sr
WR	80	Reuben Dunbar	So
WR	81	Tim Walker	Jr
TE	82	Nate Hice	Sr
TE	83	J. R. Deatherage	Jr
WR	84	Jon Olinger	So

Defense

Pos.	#	Name	Class
CB	4	LaVar Glover	Jr
FS	20	Aaron Butler	Jr
FS	21	Frank Lang	So
FS	22	DeJuan Gossett	Sr
LB	48	Troy Evans	Sr
DE	56	Antwan Peek	So
DT	90	Mario Monds	Sr
DT	94	Kirk Thompson	Jr

Special teams

Pos.	#	Name	Class
K	16	Jonathan Ruffin	So

Head coach

- Rick Minter

Coordinators/assistant coaches

Legend

- (C) Team captain
- (S) Suspended
- (I) Ineligible
- Injured
- Redshirt

Roster

== Awards and milestones ==
=== All-Americans ===
Jonathan Ruffin, K

== Players in the 2001 NFL draft ==
Player	Position	Round	Pick	NFL club
Mario Monds	DT	6	186	Washington Redskins
