= 2000 Southern Miss Golden Eagles football team =

American college football season

2000 Southern Miss Golden Eagles football

Mobile Alabama Bowl champion

Mobile Alabama Bowl, W 28–21 vs. TCU
- Conference: Conference USA
- Record: 8–4 (4–3 C-USA)
- Head coach: Jeff Bower (11th season)
- Offensive coordinator: Chris Klenakis (1st season)
- Offensive scheme: Multiple
- Defensive coordinator: Dave Wommack (2nd season)
- Base defense: 4–3
- Home stadium: M. M. Roberts Stadium

2000 Conference USA football standings
	Conf.			Overall
Team	W		L	W		L
Louisville $	6	–	1	9	–	3
East Carolina	5	–	2	8	–	4
Cincinnati	5	–	2	7	–	5
Southern Miss	4	–	3	8	–	4
UAB	3	–	3	7	–	4
Tulane	3	–	4	6	–	5
Memphis	2	–	5	4	–	7
Houston	2	–	5	3	–	8
Army	1	–	6	1	–	10
$ – Conference champion; Rankings from AP Poll

The 2000 Southern Miss Golden Eagles football team represented the University of Southern Mississippi in the 2000 NCAA Division I-A football season. The Golden Eagles were led by head coach Jeff Bower and played their home games at M. M. Roberts Stadium. They were a member of Conference USA.

For the second time in three years, the Golden Eagles earned a preseason top 25 ranking, coming in at No. 23. Despite a season-opening loss to 13th-ranked Tennessee, the Golden Eagles recovered, winning the next 6 games, with 5 of those wins coming by 21 or more points, including a 21–0 shutout over 15th-ranked Alabama. Following a near-upset on the road against Houston, Southern Miss was ranked 13th in that week's AP poll, the school's highest ranking in nearly 20 years, when they were ranked 9th during the 1981 season. The Golden Eagles win streak ended that week against eventual conference champions Louisville, and they would go onto lose two more games to finish the regular season with a 7–4 record, 4–3 in Conference USA play. Despite the late season struggles, the Golden Eagles earned a trip to the Mobile Alabama Bowl, where they defeated 13th-ranked TCU, 28–21.

== Schedule ==
Date	Time	Opponent	Rank	Site	TV	Result	Attendance	Source
September 2	6:45 pm	at No. 13 Tennessee*	No. 22	Neyland Stadium; Knoxville, TN	ESPN	L 16–19	108,064	
September 16	8:00 pm	at No. 15 Alabama*	No. 25	Legion Field; Birmingham, AL	ESPN2	W 21–0	83,091	
September 23	7:00 pm	at Oklahoma State*	No. 22	Lewis Field; Stillwater, OK		W 28–6	41,205	
September 30	2:30 pm	Memphis	No. 21	M. M. Roberts Stadium; Hattiesburg, MS (Black and Blue Bowl)	FSN	W 24–3	30,658	
October 7	6:00 pm	South Florida*	No. 17	M. M. Roberts Stadium; Hattiesburg, MS		W 41–7	26,559	
October 14	11:00 am	at Tulane	No. 16	Louisiana Superdome; New Orleans, LA (Battle for the Bell)	FSN	W 56–24	27,645	
October 28	2:30 pm	at Houston	No. 14	Robertson Stadium; Houston, TX		W 6–3	17,565	
November 4	2:30 pm	Louisville^{†}	No. 13	M. M. Roberts Stadium; Hattiesburg, MS	FSN	L 28–49	31,667	
November 11	2:30 pm	at UAB	No. 25	Legion Field; Birmingham, AL		W 33–30 ^{2OT}	25,000	
November 18	12:00 pm	at Cincinnati	No. 24	Nippert Stadium; Cincinnati, OH		L 24–27	21,958	
November 24	12:30 pm	East Carolina		M. M. Roberts Stadium; Hattiesburg, MS	FSN	L 9–14	25,152	
December 20	7:00 pm	vs. No. 13 TCU*		Ladd–Peebles Stadium; Mobile, AL (Mobile Alabama Bowl)	ESPN2	W 28–21	40,300	
*Non-conference game; ^{†}Homecoming; Rankings from AP Poll released prior to the game; All times are in Central time

== Rankings ==
Ranking movements Legend: ██ Increase in ranking ██ Decrease in ranking — = Not ranked
	Week																
Poll	Pre	1	2	3	4	5	6	7	8	9	10	11	12	13	14	15	Final
AP	23	22	25	25	22	21	17	16	15	14	13	25	24	—	—	—	—
Coaches Poll	25	24	24	—	23	21	18	16	15	14	11	22	20	—	—	—	—
BCS	Not released									14	—	—	—	—	—	—	Not released

== Roster ==
2000 Southern Miss Golden Eagles football team roster
Players
Coaches
Offense

Pos.	#	Name	Class
G	73	Jeremy Bridges	So
QB	17	Jeff Kelly	Jr
RB	43	Derrick Nix	Jr
G	76	Torrin Tucker	Fr

Defense

Pos.	#	Name	Class
DB	5	Greg Brooks	Fr
LB	24	Rod Davis	Fr
DT	98	John Nix	Sr
CB	28	Etric Pruitt	Fr
DE	96	Cedric Scott	Sr
DT	78	DeQuincy Scott	Jr
DT	90	Daleroy Stewart	Sr
CB	19	Raymond Walls	Sr
S	9	Chad Williams	Jr

Special teams

Pos.	#	Name	Class

Head coach

- Jeff Bower

Coordinators/assistant coaches

- Dave Wommack – Assistant head coach / defensive coordinator

Legend

- (C) Team captain
- (S) Suspended
- (I) Ineligible
- Injured
- Redshirt
