= 2000 UAB Blazers football team =

American college football season

2000 UAB Blazers football
- Conference: Conference USA
- Record: 7–4 (3–3 C-USA)
- Head coach: Watson Brown (6th season)
- Offensive coordinator: Pat Sullivan (2nd season)
- Offensive scheme: Multiple
- Defensive coordinator: Bill Clay (4th season)
- Base defense: 4–3
- Home stadium: Legion Field

2000 Conference USA football standings
	Conf.			Overall
Team	W		L	W		L
Louisville $	6	–	1	9	–	3
East Carolina	5	–	2	8	–	4
Cincinnati	5	–	2	7	–	5
Southern Miss	4	–	3	8	–	4
UAB	3	–	3	7	–	4
Tulane	3	–	4	6	–	5
Memphis	2	–	5	4	–	7
Houston	2	–	5	3	–	8
Army	1	–	6	1	–	10
$ – Conference champion; Rankings from AP Poll

The 2000 UAB Blazers football team represented the University of Alabama at Birmingham (UAB) as a member of the Conference USA (C-USA) during the 2000 NCAA Division I-A football season. Led by sixth-year head coach Watson Brown, the Blazers compiled an overall record of 7–4 with a mark of 3–3 in conference play, placing fifth in C-USA. UAB played home games at Legion Field in Birmingham, Alabama.

== Schedule ==
Date	Time	Opponent	Site	TV	Result	Attendance	Source
September 7	7:00 p.m.	Chattanooga*	Legion Field; Birmingham, AL	CSS	W 20–15	18,000	
September 16	7:00 p.m.	at Kansas*	Memorial Stadium; Lawrence, KS		L 20–23	28,500	
September 23	7:00 p.m.	at LSU*	Tiger Stadium; Baton Rouge, LA	WABM	W 13–10	85,339	
September 30	2:30 p.m.	Louisiana–Lafayette*	Legion Field; Birmingham, AL		W 47–2	22,000	
October 7	2:30 p.m.	Louisville	Legion Field; Birmingham, AL		L 17–38	18,000	
October 14	2:30 p.m.	Memphis	Legion Field; Birmingham, AL (Battle for the Bones)		W 13–9	15,000	
October 21	3:00 p.m.	Middle Tennessee*^{†}	Legion Field; Birmingham, AL	CSS	W 14–9	13,000	
October 28	2:30 p.m.	at East Carolina	Dowdy–Ficklen Stadium; Greenville, NC	WABM	W 16–13	28,537	
November 4	12:00 p.m.	at Cincinnati	Nippert Stadium; Cincinnati, OH		L 21–33	19,581	
November 11	2:30 p.m.	No. 25 Southern Miss	Legion Field; Birmingham, AL		L 30–33 ^{OT}	25,000	
November 18	12:00 p.m.	at Army	Michie Stadium; West Point, NY		W 27–7	35,267	
*Non-conference game; ^{†}Homecoming; Rankings from AP Poll released prior to the game; All times are in Central time
