= Derek Dorris =

American football player (born 1978)

Profile
- Position: Wide receiver

Personal information
- Born: December 1, 1978 (age 47); Arlington, Texas, U.S.
- Listed height: 6 ft 2 in (1.88 m)
- Listed weight: 206 lb (93 kg)

Career information
- High school: Azle (TX)
- College: Texas Tech (1997-2000)
- NFL draft: 2001: undrafted

Career history
- New Orleans Saints (2001)*; Washington Redskins (2001)*; New York Giants (2002)*; New York Jets (2002)*; New York Giants (2002–2003)
- * Offseason or practice squad member only
- Stats at Pro Football Reference

Derek Russell Dorris (born December 1, 1978) is an American former football wide receiver who played in the National Football League for the New York Giants for six games in 2002. He played college football at Texas Tech.

== Early life ==
Dorris attended Azle High School in Azle, Texas, where he and his brother Devon were the starting safeties on the football team in 1994. After his older brother's graduation, Derek grew into a top college recruit. As a senior, he played five positions: running back, wide receiver, kicker, kick returner and defensive back. On offense, he rushed for 1,030 yards and 11 touchdowns, caught 38 passes for 640 yards and five touchdowns, and scored 129 points. On defense, Dorris recorded 85 tackles, 14 tackles for loss, seven interceptions, six forced fumbles, and three blocked kicks. He led the Hornets to a 9–4 record and an appearance in the Class 4A Division I Region I championship game, earning Fort Worth Star-Telegram MVP honors.

Dorris also participated in basketball and track and field in high school, competing in the 100 m, 110 m hurdles, high jump, and triple jump events. He committed to play college football at Texas Tech over offers from schools such as Kansas, Texas, and UCLA.

== College career ==
Dorris was originally recruited to Texas Tech as a defensive back, but was moved to wide receiver a week ahead of his collegiate debut. He made 28 catches as a sophomore. As a junior in 1999, he missed several games with a hamstring injury. On October 28, 2000, Dorris caught a career-high four touchdown passes from Kliff Kingsbury in a 45–39 win over Kansas. He caught a seven-yard touchdown in his final collegiate game, the 2000 Galleryfurniture.com Bowl, though the Red Raiders lost to East Carolina. Dorris was later invited to play in the Gridiron Classic.

== Professional career ==
After going undrafted in the 2001 NFL draft, Dorris signed a free agent contract with the New Orleans Saints. He left camp in late August and was quickly signed off waivers by the Washington Redskins. Dorris was cut from the team a few days later.

On April 20, 2002, Dorris signed with the New York Giants. He made six catches for 82 yards in the preseason before he was waived in August. Dorris was claimed off waivers by the New York Jets in September, though he was waived a few days later. He was signed to the Giants' practice squad in November and promoted to the active roster a few days later ahead of their game against Washington. Dorris played six games for the injury-riddled Giants that season. He was released in August 2003.
