= 2000 Tulane Green Wave football team =

American college football season

2000 Tulane Green Wave football
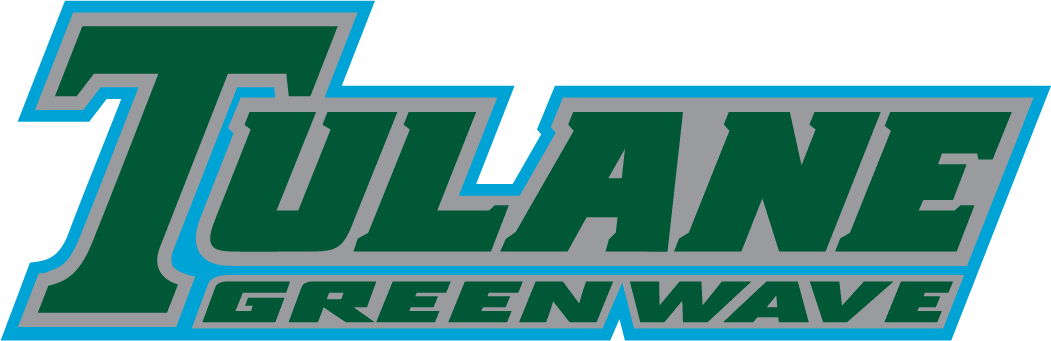
- Conference: Conference USA
- Record: 6–5 (3–4 C-USA)
- Head coach: Chris Scelfo (2nd season)
- Offensive scheme: Multiple
- Defensive coordinator: Pete McGinnis (2nd season)
- Base defense: 4–3
- Home stadium: Louisiana Superdome

2000 Conference USA football standings
	Conf.			Overall
Team	W		L	W		L
Louisville $	6	–	1	9	–	3
East Carolina	5	–	2	8	–	4
Cincinnati	5	–	2	7	–	5
Southern Miss	4	–	3	8	–	4
UAB	3	–	3	7	–	4
Tulane	3	–	4	6	–	5
Memphis	2	–	5	4	–	7
Houston	2	–	5	3	–	8
Army	1	–	6	1	–	10
$ – Conference champion; Rankings from AP Poll

The 2000 Tulane Green Wave football team represented Tulane University in the 2000 NCAA Division I-A football season. The Green Wave played their home games at the Louisiana Superdome. They competed in Conference USA. The team was coached by head coach Chris Scelfo.

== Schedule ==
Date	Time	Opponent	Site	TV	Result	Attendance	Source
September 2	11:30 am	at Ole Miss*	Vaught–Hemingway Stadium; Oxford, MS	JPS	L 20–49	46,847	
September 16	2:30 pm	at East Carolina	Dowdy–Ficklen Stadium; Greenville, NC	FSN	L 17–37	38,517	
September 23	6:00 pm	at SMU*	Gerald J. Ford Stadium; University Park, TX		W 29–17	26,375	
September 30	5:00 pm	Cincinnati	Louisiana Superdome; New Orleans, LA		W 24–19	22,446	
October 7	4:00 pm	at Louisiana–Lafayette*	Cajun Field; Lafayette, LA		W 38–37	20,113	
October 14	11:00 am	No. 16 Southern Miss^{†}	Louisiana Superdome; New Orleans, LA (Battle for the Bell)	FSN	L 24–56	27,645	
October 21	11:00 am	at Army	Michie Stadium; West Point, New York	FSN	L 17–21	40,107	
October 28	1:00 pm	at Louisville	Papa John's Cardinal Stadium; Louisville, KY		L 32–35	30,387	
November 4	5:00 pm	Houston	Louisiana Superdome; New Orleans, LA		W 41–23	16,785	
November 11	5:00 pm	Navy*	Louisiana Superdome; New Orleans, LA		W 50–38	20,081	
November 18	5:00 pm	Memphis	Louisiana Superdome; New Orleans, LA		W 37–14	17,269	
*Non-conference game; ^{†}Homecoming; Rankings from AP Poll released prior to the game; All times are in Central time

== Roster ==
2000 Tulane Green Wave football team roster
Players
Coaches
Offense

Pos.	#	Name	Class
QB	7	Patrick Ramsey	Jr
OL	60	Seth Zaunbrecher	So
OT	74	Bernard Robertson	Sr

Defense

Pos.	#	Name	Class
DB	1	John Wilson	Sr
DB	3	Jeff Sanchez	So
CB	15	Tim Carter	Sr
LB	46	Blake Baker	Fr

Special teams

Pos.	#	Name	Class
K	47	Seth Marler	So
P	36	Casey Roussel	Jr

Head coach

- Chris Scelfo

Coordinators/assistant coaches

Legend

- (C) Team captain
- (S) Suspended
- (I) Ineligible
- Injured
- Redshirt

Roster
Last update: 2000-12-06

== NFL draft ==
The 2001 NFL draft was held on April 21–22, 2001. The following Green Wave player was selected.

Round	Pick	Player	Position	NFL club
5	138	Bernard Robertson	Offensive tackle	Chicago Bears
