= 2000 Memphis Tigers football team =

American college football season

2000 Memphis Tigers football
- Conference: Conference USA
- Record: 4–7 (2–5 C-USA)
- Head coach: Rip Scherer (6th season)
- Offensive coordinator: Rip Scherer (1st as OC, 6th overall season)
- Defensive coordinator: Tommy West (1st season)
- Home stadium: Liberty Bowl Memorial Stadium

2000 Conference USA football standings
| | Conf. | | | Overall |
| Team | W | | L | W | | L |
|---|---|---|---|---|---|---|
| Louisville $ | 6 | – | 1 | 9 | – | 3 |
| East Carolina | 5 | – | 2 | 8 | – | 4 |
| Cincinnati | 5 | – | 2 | 7 | – | 5 |
| Southern Miss | 4 | – | 3 | 8 | – | 4 |
| UAB | 3 | – | 3 | 7 | – | 4 |
| Tulane | 3 | – | 4 | 6 | – | 5 |
| Memphis | 2 | – | 5 | 4 | – | 7 |
| Houston | 2 | – | 5 | 3 | – | 8 |
| Army | 1 | – | 6 | 1 | – | 10 |
$ – Conference champion; Rankings from AP Poll

The 2000 Memphis Tigers football team represented the University of Memphis in the 2000 NCAA Division I-A football season. Memphis competed as a member of the Conference USA. The team was led by head coach Rip Scherer, who was fired at the conclusion of the season. The Tigers played their home games at the Liberty Bowl Memorial Stadium.

== Schedule ==
↓↓↓

| Date | Time | Opponent | Site | TV | Result | Attendance | Source |
|---|---|---|---|---|---|---|---|
| September 2 | 2:30 pm | Mississippi State* | Liberty Bowl Memorial Stadium; Memphis, TN | FSN | L 3–17 | 34,113 | |
| September 9 | 7:00 pm | Louisiana–Monroe* | Liberty Bowl Memorial Stadium; Memphis, TN | | W 28–0 | 20,801 | |
| September 16 | 6:00 pm | at Arkansas State* | Indian Stadium; Jonesboro, AR (Paint Bucket Bowl) | | W 19–17 | 19,022 | |
| September 23 | 12:00 pm | at Army | Michie Stadium; West Point, NY | | W 26–16 | 38,375 | |
| September 30 | 2:30 pm | at No. 21 Southern Miss | M. M. Roberts Stadium; Hattiesburg, MS (Black and Blue Bowl) | FSN | L 3–24 | 30,658 | |
| October 7 | 2:00 pm | East Carolina | Liberty Bowl Memorial Stadium; Memphis, TN | FSN | W 17–10 | 23,496 | |
| October 14 | 2:30 pm | at UAB | Legion Field; Birminghaml AL (Battle for the Bones) | | L 9–13 | 15,000 | |
| October 21 | 7:00 pm | Houston | Liberty Bowl Memorial Stadium; Memphis, TN | | L 30–33 ^{3OT} | 26,662 | |
| November 4 | 11:00 am | Tennessee* | Liberty Bowl Memorial Stadium; Memphis, TN | FSN | L 17–19 | 63,121 | |
| November 11 | 1:00 pm | Cincinnati^{†} | Liberty Bowl Memorial Stadium; Memphis, TN | | L 10–13 | 21,862 | |
| November 18 | 5:00 pm | at Tulane | Louisiana Superdome; New Orleans, LA | | L 14–37 | 17,269 | |
*Non-conference game; ^{†}Homecoming; Rankings from AP Poll released prior to the game; All times are in Central time
