= Steve Logan (American football) =

American football coach (born 1953)

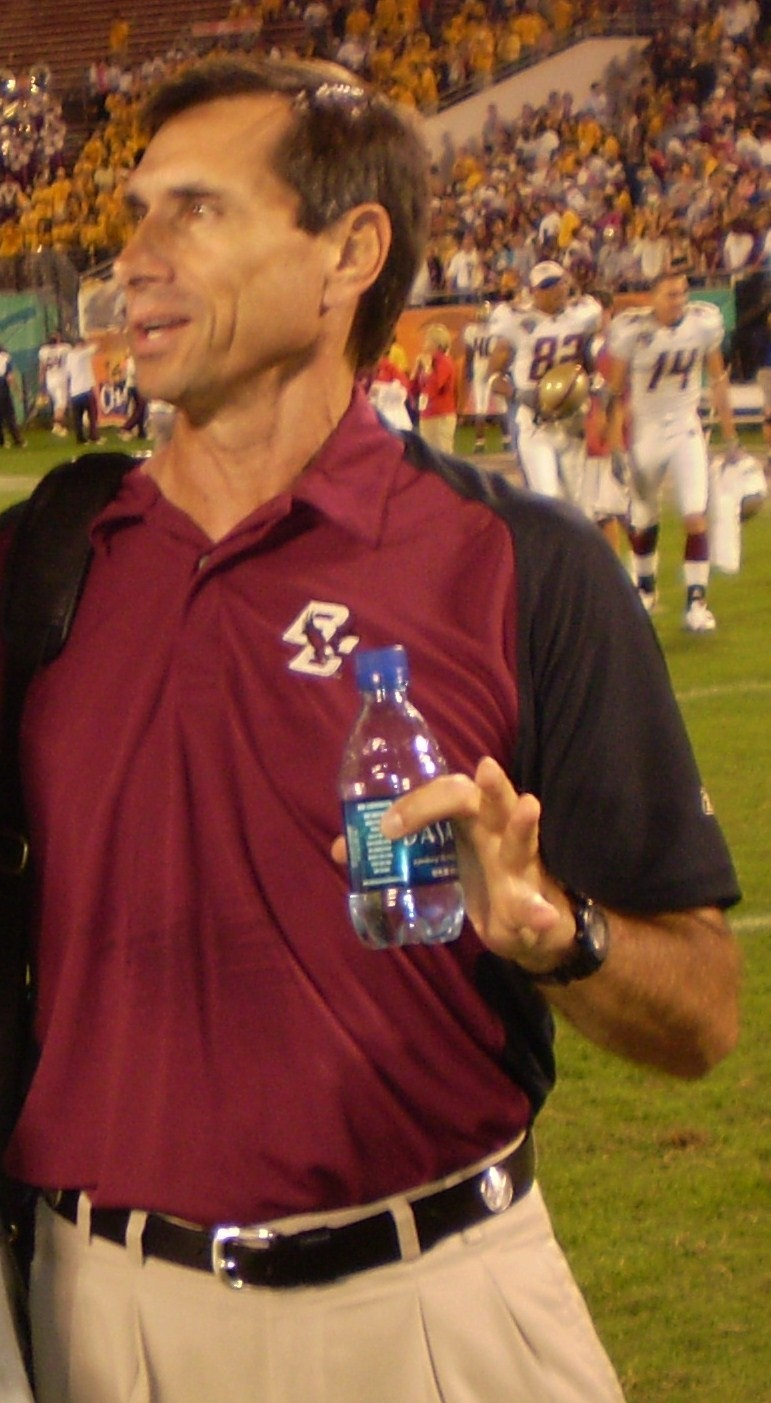
- Logan in 2009

Louisville Kings
- Title: Offensive coordinator

Personal information
- Born: February 3, 1953 (age 73); Lawton, Oklahoma, U.S.

Career information
- College: University of Tulsa; Emporia State

Career history
- Union High School (OK) (1975–1979) Assistant coach; Oklahoma State (1980) Tight ends coach; Hutchinson (1981–1982) Head coach; Tulsa (1983) Quarterbacks coach/wide receivers coach; Tulsa (1984) Offensive coordinator/wide receivers coach; Colorado (1985–1986) Running backs coach; Mississippi State (1987–1988) Quarterbacks coach; East Carolina (1989) Running backs coach; East Carolina (1990–1991) Co-offensive coordinator/quarterbacks coach; East Carolina (1992–2002) Head coach; Berlin Thunder (2004–2005) Quarterbacks coach/wide receivers coach; Rhein Fire (2006) Offensive coordinator/quarterbacks coach; Boston College (2007–2008) Offensive coordinator; Tampa Bay Buccaneers (2009–2011) Running backs coach; San Francisco 49ers (2015) Quarterbacks coach; Birmingham Iron (2019) Offensive coordinator/quarterbacks coach; Louisville Kings (2026–present) Offensive coordinator

Awards and highlights
- UFL champion (2026); KJCCC Coach of the Year (1982)

Head coaching record
- Postseason: 2–3 (.400) (bowls)
- Career: 69–58 (.543) (college); 8–11 (.421) (junior college)

Steve Logan (born February 3, 1953) is an American football coach who is the offensive coordinator for the Louisville Kings of the United Football League (UFL). Logan was the head football coach at East Carolina University from 1992 to 2002, compiling a record of 69–58.

== Early life ==
Logan was born in Lawton, Oklahoma and grew up in Broken Arrow, Oklahoma. He attended Broken Arrow High School where he lettered in football, basketball and track. Logan was recruited by coach Bud Elliott to play football at Emporia State University, a Division II school in Emporia, Kansas. He played one season as a defensive back for the Hornets before deciding to end his playing career. Logan then transferred to the University of Tulsa, planning to pursue a career in college teaching. After graduating in 1975, he was hired as a physical education teacher and assistant football coach at Union High School in Tulsa, Oklahoma.

== Coaching career ==
=== Early positions ===
His first collegiate coaching position was a one-year stint as tight ends coach at Oklahoma State University under head coach Jimmy Johnson. He then spent the next two years as head football coach at Hutchinson Community College, a junior college in Hutchinson, Kansas. In his second year there, Logan was named the Kansas Jayhawk Conference Coach of the Year after guiding the team to a 6–4 record. In 1983, he returned to his alma mater as an assistant coach for head coach John Cooper. While at Tulsa, he tutored the quarterbacks and wide receivers during his first season before taking the reins as offensive coordinator in 1984. The following year, Logan headed to the University of Colorado where he coached the Buffaloes' running backs and helped to install the wishbone offense. After two seasons on Bill McCartney's staff, he was hired as the quarterbacks coach at Mississippi State University in 1987.

=== East Carolina University ===
In 1989, Logan became an assistant coach at East Carolina University. He was the team's offensive coordinator under Bill Lewis from 1990 to 1991, working alongside future Boston College Head Coach Jeff Jagodzinski. When Logan succeeded Lewis, Jagodzinski remained on staff for four years before accepting the offensive coordinator position at Boston College. The 1991 Pirate team finished 11–1, reached a top-10 national ranking and defeated NC State in the Peach Bowl.

Logan served as the head coach of East Carolina from 1992 to 2002. He became the school's all-time winning coach (69–58), and led the Pirates to five bowl games, including the 1994 Liberty Bowl, the 1995 Liberty Bowl, the 1999 Mobile Alabama Bowl, the 2000 Galleryfurniture.com Bowl, and the 2001 GMAC Bowl. Logan's 1995 team finished with a 9–3 record and a No. 23 ranking in the final Associated Press poll. In 1996, ECU gave the Miami Hurricanes their worst defeat (31–6) in the Orange Bowl in 12 seasons. In 1999, ECU upset #9 Miami at Carter–Finley Stadium in Raleigh, North Carolina, after Hurricane Floyd devastated Greenville. For this 9–3 season, which also included victories over West Virginia, South Carolina, and NC State en route to another bowl game. the team won the ESPN Spirit Award. He resigned on December 7, 2002, after a "substandard" 4–8 season. Three of Logan's quarterbacks; Jeff Blake, Marcus Crandell, and David Garrard went on to pro careers.

=== NFL Europe ===
After a one-year hiatus from coaching, Logan entered the professional ranks in 2004 with the Berlin Thunder of NFL Europe, spending two seasons as the team's quarterbacks and wide receivers coach. During his first season, he helped head coach Rick Lantz lead the Thunder to a 9–1 regular season mark, tying the league record for wins in a season, and a 30–24 victory over the Frankfurt Galaxy in World Bowl XII. The following year, Berlin again finished the regular season in first place with a record of 7–3, but fell to the Amsterdam Admirals in World Bowl XIII, 27–21. In 2006, he served as the offensive coordinator and quarterbacks coach for the Rhein Fire. Logan helped Dave Ragone (2004) and Rohan Davey (2005) earn Offensive Player of the Year and All-NFL Europe honors.

=== Boston College ===
Logan rejoined former assistant Jeff Jagodzinski as offensive coordinator at Boston College in 2007. He helped develop quarterback Matt Ryan, who would win the ACC Player of the Year, the Johnny Unitas Golden Arm Award, the Manning Award and was named the AP NFL Rookie of the Year.

In January 2009, Jagodzinski got fired after interviewing for the New York Jets head coaching vacancy. Logan was considered a candidate to replace him, and interviewed for the job with Boston College athletic director Gene DeFilippo. After the school had promoted defensive coordinator Frank Spaziani to the head coaching position, Logan decided to leave the program.

=== Tampa Bay Buccaneers ===
Logan was hired as the running backs coach for the NFL's Tampa Bay Buccaneers on February 11, 2009, reuniting him with Jagodzinski, the team's offensive coordinator. After Jagodzinski's firing in September 2009, Logan remained on the Buccaneers staff. After the Buccaneers 4–12 record in the 2011 season, Raheem Morris and his entire coaching were fired.

=== WRAL analyst ===
During 2013–2014 Logan worked as a special guest football analyst in a "cross divisional programming lineup" with multiple TV and Radio channels associated with WRAL-TV out of Raleigh, North Carolina. Logan would provide predictions and analysis focused specifically on college teams in the WRAL market (UNC-Chapel Hill, NC State, Duke and East Carolina) and the Carolina Panthers of the NFL. WRAL-TV Sports Anchor, Jeff Gravely served as host of the TV segments. Logan would also be featured in front of a telestrator in a segment called "Coaching 101". In these segments he would explain the strategy behind common football plays, formations, and other elements of the game.

=== San Francisco 49ers ===
On January 28, 2015, it was reported Logan agreed to be the quarterbacks coach of the San Francisco 49ers. However, after just one season, he was relieved of his duties due to the firing of Jim Tomsula and hiring of Chip Kelly.

=== Birmingham Iron ===
In 2018, Logan became the offensive coordinator and quarterbacks coach for the Birmingham Iron of the Alliance of American Football.

== Personal life ==
Logan and his wife, Laura, have two sons, Vince and Nate.

== Head coaching record ==
=== College ===
Year	Team	Overall	Conference	Standing	Bowl/playoffs	Coaches^{#}	AP^{°}
East Carolina Pirates (Independent) (1992–1996)
1992	East Carolina	5–6					
1993	East Carolina	2–9					
1994	East Carolina	7–5			L Liberty		
1995	East Carolina	9–3			W Liberty	23	
1996	East Carolina	8–3					
East Carolina Pirates (Conference USA) (1997–2002)
1997	East Carolina	5–6	4–2	3rd			
1998	East Carolina	6–5	3–3	4th			
1999	East Carolina	9–3	4–2	T–2nd	L Mobile Alabama		
2000	East Carolina	8–4	5–2	T–2nd	W Gallery Furniture.com		
2001	East Carolina	6–6	5–2	T–2nd	L GMAC		
2002	East Carolina	4–8	4–4	T–5th			
East Carolina:		69–58	25–15				
Total:		69–58					
^{#}Rankings from final Coaches Poll.; ^{°}Rankings from final AP Poll.

=== Junior college ===
Year	Team	Overall	Conference	Standing	Bowl/playoffs
Hutchinson Blue Dragons (Kansas Jayhawk Community College Conference) (1981–1982)
1981	Hutchinson	2–7	2–6	7th	
1982	Hutchinson	6–4	5–3	3rd	
Hutchinson:		8–11	7–9		
Total:		8–11			
