= Laroni Gallishaw =

American football player (born 1981)

No. 28
- Position: Defensive back

Personal information
- Born: April 4, 1981 (age 45); Lakeland, Florida, U.S.
- Listed height: 6 ft 0 in (1.83 m)
- Listed weight: 190 lb (86 kg)

Career information
- High school: Lakeland
- College: Louisville (2000–2002); Murray State (2003–2004)
- NFL draft: 2005: undrafted

Career history
- Minnesota Vikings (2005)

Career NFL statistics
- Games played: 6
- Stats at Pro Football Reference

Laroni Gallishaw (born April 4, 1981) is an American former professional football player who was a defensive back for the Minnesota Vikings of the National Football League (NFL) in 2005. He played college football for the Louisville Cardinals and Murray State Racers.
