= John Bond (American football coach) =

American college football player and coach (born 1962)

Biographical details
- Born: c. 1962 (age 63–64); Rogers, Arkansas, U.S.

Playing career
- 1981: Arkansas

Coaching career (HC unless noted)
- 1985: Arkansas (GA)
- 1986–1990: Southwest Missouri State (RB)
- 1991–1993: UTEP (QB)
- 1994–1995: Delta State (QB/PGC)
- 1996–1999: Illinois State (OC/QB)
- 2000–2003: Army (OC/QB)
- 2004–2006: Northern Illinois (OC)
- 2007: Georgia Tech (OC)
- 2008–2012: Georgia State (OC)
- 2013: UMass (OC)
- 2014–2015: UT Martin (OC)
- 2017: Northern Iowa (QB)
- 2018: Northern Iowa (OC)

John Bond (born 1962) is an American college football coach. He served as the offensive coordinator for Illinois State, Army, Northern Illinois, Georgia Tech, Georgia State, UMass, UT Martin, and Northern Iowa.

== Playing career ==
In college, Bond played for the Arkansas Razorbacks for one season before a career-ending injury. He earned a bachelor's degree in physical education from the University of Arkansas in 1985.

== Coaching career ==
Bond began his career as a graduate assistant at his alma mater, Arkansas, in 1985 under head coach Ken Hatfield. He then moved on to serve as the running backs coach and recruiting coordinator at Southwest Missouri State University—now known as Missouri State University—from 1986 to 1990. Then moved on to become the quarterbacks coach for UTEP from 1991 to 1993, and the quarterbacks coach and passing game coordinator at Delta State University from 1994 to 1995,

In 1996 Bond became the wide receivers coach at Illinois State and was named the team's offensive coordinator in 1997 a position that he held until 1999. He then served as the offensive coordinator for Army from 2000 to 2003 before becoming the offensive coordinator and quarterbacks coach for Northern Illinois from 2004 to 2006. In 2007 Bond served as the offensive coordinator for Georgia Tech but was not retained at the end of the season when head coach Chan Gailey was fired. From 2008 to 2012 Bond served as the offensive coordinator for Georgia State as part of the Panthers inaugural coaching staff as they began their eventual transition to playing FBS football. It was announced that Bond would serve as the offensive coordinator for UMass for the 2013 season. Bond's tenure at UMass would only be one season as he was relieved of his duties one day after the final game of the season.
