= 1999 Mobile Alabama Bowl =

TCU Horned Frogs	East Carolina Pirates
(7–4)	(9–2)
WAC	C-USA
28	14
Head coach: Dennis Franchione	Head coach: Steve Logan
	AP / Coaches / BCS; 20 / 19 / NR
	1	2	3	4	Total
TCU	7	14	0	7	28
East Carolina	7	0	7	0	14
- Date: December 22, 1999
- Season: 1999
- Stadium: Ladd–Peebles Stadium
- Location: Mobile, Alabama
- MVP: TCU QB Casey Printers
- Referee: John Laurie (Big 12)
- Attendance: 34,200

United States TV coverage
- Network: ESPN
- Announcers: Rich Waltz (Play by Play); Rod Gilmore (Analyst); Don McPherson (Sideline)

The 1999 Mobile Alabama Bowl was an American college football bowl game. It was part of the 1999 NCAA Division I-A football season, and was the inaugural edition of the Mobile Alabama Bowl (which has subsequently gone though several name changes). It was played on December 22, 1999, and featured the 8–3 East Carolina Pirates (Coaches/ESPN No. 20) of Conference USA, and the 7–4 TCU Horned Frogs of the Western Athletic Conference (WAC). The game was played at Ladd–Peebles Stadium in Mobile, Alabama.

== Game recap ==
East Carolina opened the scoring with a 58-yard touchdown pass from quarterback David Garrard to wide receiver Arnie Powell. TCU running back LaDainian Tomlinson scored on a 2-yard touchdown run to tie the game at 7 after one quarter. Casey Printers threw a 21-yard touchdown pass in the second quarter, and the Horned Frogs took a 14–7 lead. Tomlinson, who had 124 yards rushing in the game, scored on a 3-yard touchdown run before halftime, to give TCU a 21-7 halftime lead.

In the third quarter, Jamie Wilson scored on a 13-yard touchdown run to bring East Carolina within a touchdown. Russell Gary scored on an interception return to give TCU a 28–14 lead. TCU, which alternated between the quarterbacks Casey and Patrick Batteaux, made it impossible for the Pirates to adjust to the variance of play styles between the drop back passer Printers and the option running Batteaux. The Frogs defense shut down the Pirates' running game, holding them to minus-16 yards. TCU held on to that lead to win the game by that margin.
