= 2000 East Carolina Pirates football team =

American college football season

2000 East Carolina Pirates football

Galleryfurniture.com Bowl champion

Galleryfurniture.com Bowl, W 40–27 vs. Texas Tech
- Conference: Conference USA
- Record: 8–4 (5–2 C-USA)
- Head coach: Steve Logan (9th season)
- Offensive coordinator: Doug Martin (5th season)
- Offensive scheme: Spread
- Defensive coordinator: Tim Rose (2nd season)
- Base defense: 4–3
- Home stadium: Dowdy–Ficklen Stadium

2000 Conference USA football standings
	Conf.			Overall
Team	W		L	W		L
Louisville $	6	–	1	9	–	3
East Carolina	5	–	2	8	–	4
Cincinnati	5	–	2	7	–	5
Southern Miss	4	–	3	8	–	4
UAB	3	–	3	7	–	4
Tulane	3	–	4	6	–	5
Memphis	2	–	5	4	–	7
Houston	2	–	5	3	–	8
Army	1	–	6	1	–	10
$ – Conference champion; Rankings from AP Poll

The 2000 East Carolina Pirates football team was an American football team that represented East Carolina University as a member of Conference USA during the 2000 NCAA Division I-A football season. In their ninth season under head coach Steve Logan, the team compiled a 8–4 record. The Pirates offense scored 370 points while the defense allowed 256 points.

== Schedule ==
Date	Time	Opponent	Site	TV	Result	Attendance	Source
September 2	6:00 pm	at Duke*	Wallace Wade Stadium; Durham, NC		W 38–0	30,224	
September 7	8:00 pm	No. 10 Virginia Tech*	Dowdy–Ficklen Stadium; Greenville, NC	ESPN	L 28–45	45,123	
September 16	3:30 pm	Tulane	Dowdy–Ficklen Stadium; Greenville, NC	FSN	W 37–17	38,517	
September 23	12:00 pm	Syracuse*	Dowdy–Ficklen Stadium; Greenville, NC	ESPN2	W 34–17	33,026	
October 7	3:00 pm	at Memphis	Liberty Bowl; Memphis, TN	FSN	L 10–17	23,496	
October 14	7:00 pm	Army	Dowdy–Ficklen Stadium; Greenville, NC	FSN	W 42–21	39,200	
October 19	7:00 pm	at Louisville	Papa John's Cardinal Stadium; Louisville, KY	FSN	W 28–25	38,024	
October 28	3:30 pm	UAB^{†}	Dowdy–Ficklen Stadium; Greenville, NC		L 13–16	28,537	
November 11	12:00 pm	Houston	Dowdy–Ficklen Stadium; Greenville, NC	FSN	W 62–20	33,339	
November 18	12:00 pm	at West Virginia*	Mountaineer Field; Morgantown, WV	ESPN	L 24–42	40,389	
November 24	1:30 pm	at Southern Miss	M. M. Roberts Stadium; Hattiesburg, MS	FSN	W 14–9	25,152	
December 27	8:00 pm	vs. Texas Tech*	Houston Astrodome; Houston, TX (Galleryfurniture.com Bowl)	ESPN	W 40–27	33,899	
*Non-conference game; ^{†}Homecoming; Rankings from AP Poll released prior to the game; All times are in Eastern time
