= Dennis Therrell =

American football player and coach (born 1956)

Biographical details
- Born: August 30, 1956 (age 70); Pikeville, Tennessee, U.S.
- Education: Tennessee Tech (1978); Tennessee (1985)

Playing career
- 1974–1976: Tennessee Tech
- Position: Linebacker

Coaching career (HC unless noted)
- 1983–1984: Tennessee (GA)
- 1985–1986: Middle Tennessee (DE)
- 1987–1989: Lock Haven (DC)
- 1990–1995: Lock Haven
- 1996–1999: Illinois State (DC)
- 2000–2003: Army (DC)
- 2004–2005: Murray State (DC)
- 2006: Auburn (VA)
- 2007: UNLV (LB)
- 2008: UNLV (DC/LB)
- 2009: UNLV (DC/S)
- 2010–2011: Las Vegas Locomotives (LB)
- 2012: Las Vegas Locomotives (DB)
- 2013–2014: Murray State (DC)
- 2017: Bledsoe County HS (TN)

Head coaching record
- Overall: 14–51–1 (college); 4–7 (high school)

Accomplishments and honors

Championships
- 1 UFL (2010)

Dennis Therrell (born August 30, 1956) is an American football coach and former player. He served as the head football coach at Lock Haven University of Pennsylvania from 1990 to 1995, compiling a record of 14–51–1. Therrell played collegiately as a linebacker at Tennessee Tech during the mid-1970s.

== Coaching career ==
Therrell began his coaching career at the high school level, serving for one year at Campbell County High School (1979) and three seasons at Rhea County High School (1980–1982) in Tennessee. He made his first entry into major college football as a graduate assistant coach at the University of Tennessee. In 1985, he became an assistant football coach for Middle Tennessee State University, coaching the Blue Raiders defensive ends until 1987. He then served as the defensive coordinator for Division-II member Lock Haven University for three years (1987–1989), before becoming the school's head coach in 1990.

In 1996, Therrell joined Todd Berry's coaching staff at Illinois State University as the defensive coordinator. He helped to lead the Redbirds to the 1999 NCAA Division I-AA semifinals. Following the 1999 campaign, Therrell followed Berry to the United States Military Academy, where he served as the defensive coordinator for four seasons (2000–2003).

He then was the defensive coordinator for Murray State University from 2004 to 2005. The Murray State Racers football team defense was ranked fourth. Subsequently, Therrell had a three-year stint at UNLV from 2007 to 2009, serving as the Rebels defensive coordinator for the last two seasons. He also coached the safeties in 2009, after spending his first two seasons mentoring the linebackers.

After coaching three seasons in the professional ranks with the Las Vegas Locomotives of the United Football League (UFL), Therrell returned to Murray State as defensive coordinator in 2013.

Therrell served as head coach at his alma mater, Bledsoe County High School, during the fall of 2017, leading the Warriors to a 4–7 record. He resigned in July 2018.

== Head coaching record ==
=== College ===
Year	Team	Overall	Conference	Standing	Bowl/playoffs
Lock Haven Bald Eagles (Pennsylvania State Athletic Conference) (1990–1995)
1990	Lock Haven	1–10	0–6	7th (West)	
1991	Lock Haven	4–7	2–4	T–5th (West)	
1992	Lock Haven	3–7–1	1–4–1	6th (West)	
1993	Lock Haven	2–9	0–6	7th (West)	
1994	Lock Haven	2–9	1–5	7th (West)	
1995	Lock Haven	2–9	0–6	7th (West)	
Lock Haven:		14–51–1	4–31–1		
Total:		14–51–1			

=== High school ===
Year	Team	Overall	Conference	Standing	Bowl/playoffs
Bledsoe County Warriors () (2017)
2017	Bledsoe County	4–7	1–3	4th	
Bledsoe County:		4–7	1–3		
Total:		4–7			
