= Leonard Henry (American football) =

American football player (born 1978)

No. 26, 33, 45
- Position: Running back

Personal information
- Born: January 5, 1978 (age 48); Clinton, North Carolina, U.S.
- Listed height: 6 ft 1 in (1.85 m)
- Listed weight: 210 lb (95 kg)

Career information
- High school: Clinton
- College: East Carolina (1998–2001)
- NFL draft: 2002: 7th round, 241st overall pick

Career history
- Miami Dolphins (2002–2004); Frankfurt Galaxy (2004); New York Jets (2005)*; Oakland Raiders (2005)*
- * Offseason or practice squad member only

Awards and highlights
- Third-team All-American (2001)

Career NFL statistics
- Rushing yards: 141
- Average: 3.1
- Touchdowns: 0
- Stats at Pro Football Reference

Leonard Henry (born January 5, 1978) is an American former professional football player who was a running back in the National Football League (NFL). He was selected 241st overall by the Miami Dolphins in the seventh round of the 2002 NFL draft. He played college football for the East Carolina Pirates. Henry was also a member of the Frankfurt Galaxy, New York Jets and Oakland Raiders.
