= 2003 New York Giants season =

NFL team season

- Owner: Wellington Mara
- General manager: Ernie Accorsi
- Head coach: Jim Fassel
- Home stadium: Giants Stadium

Results
- Record: 4–12
- Division place: 4th NFC East
- Playoffs: Did not qualify
- Pro Bowlers: 2: TE Jeremy Shockey; DE Michael Strahan

Uniform
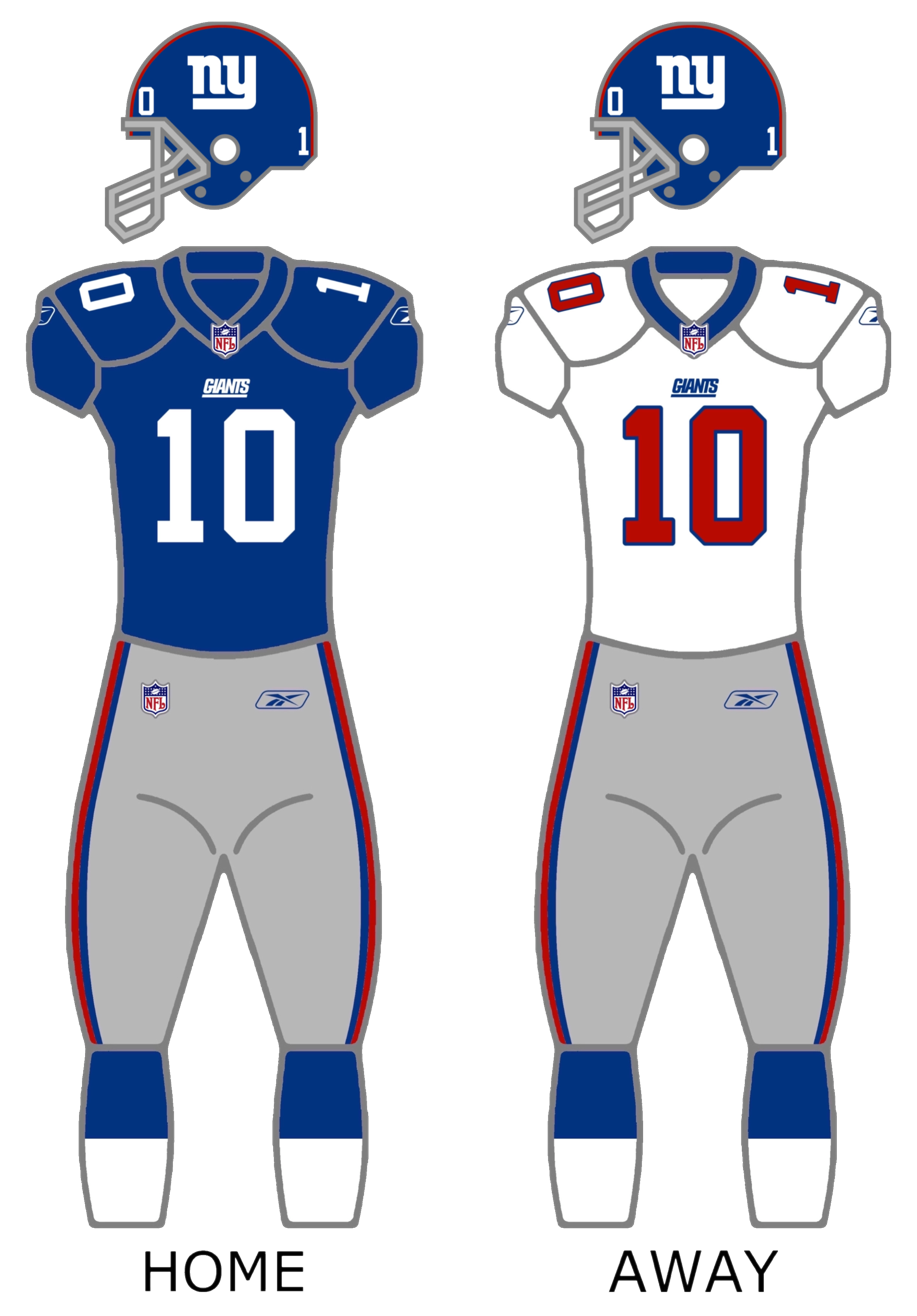

The 2003 season was the New York Giants' 79th season in the National Football League (NFL) and their seventh and final under head coach Jim Fassel. The team failed to duplicate their 2002 season's playoff appearance, instead only winning four games and missing the playoffs for the first time since 2001, finishing the season on an eight-game losing streak. Jim Fassel was fired after the 2003 season and was replaced by Tom Coughlin in 2004.

== Offseason ==
Additions	Subtractions
FB Jim Finn (Colts)	FB Charles Stackhouse (Vikings)
P Jeff Feagles (Seahawks)	TE Dan Campbell (Cowboys)
RB Dorsey Levens (Eagles)	CB Jason Sehorn (Rams)
RB Brian Mitchell (Eagles)	G Jason Whittle (Buccaneers)
DE Keith Washington (Broncos)	T Mike Rosenthal (Vikings)

=== NFL draft ===
2003 New York Giants draft
Round	Pick	Player	Position	College	Notes
1	25	William Joseph	DT	Miami (Fla.)	
2	56	Osi Umenyiora *	DE	Troy	
3	91	Visanthe Shiancoe	TE	Morgan State	
4	123	Rod Babers	CB	Texas	
5	160	David Diehl *	T	Illinois	
6	199	Willie Ponder	WR	Southeast Missouri State	
6	207	Frank Walker	CB	Tuskegee	
6	211	David Tyree *	WR	Syracuse	
7	240	Charles Drake	S	Michigan	
7	249	Wayne Lucier	C	Colorado	
7	255	Kevin Walter	WR	Eastern Michigan	
Made roster † Pro Football Hall of Fame * Made at least one Pro Bowl during career

=== Undrafted free agents ===
2003 undrafted free agents of note
Player	Position	College
Jeff Roehl	Tackle	Northwestern

== Roster ==
2003 New York Giants roster
Quarterbacks (QB): 5 Kerry Collins; 17 Jason Garrett; 3 Jesse Palmer; Running backs (RB): 21 Tiki Barber; 27 Ron Dayne; 20 Jim Finn FB; 33 Delvin Joyce KR; 28 Dorsey Levens; 30 Brian Mitchell KR/PR; Wide receivers (WR): 13 Ataveus Cash; 88 Ike Hilliard; 87 Willie Ponder; 81 Amani Toomer; 85 David Tyree; Tight ends (TE): 89 Darnell Dinkins; 44 Tony McGee; 83 Marcellus Rivers; 82 Visanthe Shiancoe; 80 Jeremy Shockey	Offensive linemen (OL): 74 Ian Allen T; 67 Chris Bober C/T; 66 David Diehl G; 76 Jeff Hatch T; 63 Scott Peters G; 73 Jeff Roehl T; 65 Mike Saffer T; 68 Omar Smith C; Defensive linemen (DL): 95 Frank Ferrara DE; 97 Cornelius Griffin DT; 75 Keith Hamilton DT; 94 William Joseph DT; 70 Lance Legree DT; 92 Michael Strahan DE; 72 Osi Umenyiora DE; 99 Keith Washington DE	Linebackers (LB): 58 Micheal Barrow MLB; 54 Nick Greisen OLB; 55 Dhani Jones OLB; 59 Kevin Lewis MLB; 93 Quincy Monk OLB; 53 Brandon Short OLB; Defensive backs (DB): 31 Ike Charlton CB; 39 Ryan Clark FS; 29 Ray Green CB/S; 37 Johnnie Harris SS; 35 Clarence LeBlanc SS; 26 Kato Serwanga CB; 34 Reggie Stephens CB; 23 Omar Stoutmire FS; 41 Frank Walker CB; Special teams (ST): 8 Matt Bryant K; 57 Carson Dach LS; 10 Jeff Feagles P	Practice squad: 18 Ryan Hoag WR; 71 Radell Lockhart DE; 60 Dion Meredith T; 64 Sean O'Connor G; 43 Kalvin Pearson S; Reserve: 25 Will Allen CB (IR); 22 Ralph Brown CB (IR); 84 Tim Carter WR (IR); 86 Ron Dixon WR (PUP); 2 Mike Hollis K (IR); 90 Kenny Holmes DE (IR); 91 Ryan Kuehl LS (IR); 62 Wayne Lucier C/G (IR); 51 Wesly Mallard LB (IR); 24 Will Peterson CB (IR); 77 Luke Petitgout T (IR); 69 Rich Seubert G (IR); 36 Shaun Williams S (IR); Rookies in italics 53 active, 13 reserve, 5 practice squad

== Preseason ==
Week	Date	Opponent	Result	Record	Venue	Recap
1	August 7	at New England Patriots	L 6–26	0–1	Gillette Stadium	Recap
2	August 15	Carolina Panthers	L 10–20	0–2	Giants Stadium	Recap
3	August 23	New York Jets	L 14–15	0–3	Giants Stadium	Recap
4	August 28	at Baltimore Ravens	W 30–24	1–3	M&T Bank Stadium	Recap

== Regular season ==
=== Schedule ===
Week	Date	Opponent	Result	Record	Venue	Recap
1	September 7	St. Louis Rams	**W** 23–13	1–0	Giants Stadium	Recap
2	September 15	**Dallas Cowboys**	**L** 32–35 (OT)	1–1	Giants Stadium	Recap
3	September 21	at **Washington Redskins**	**W** 24–21 (OT)	2–1	FedExField	Recap
4	Bye					
5	October 5	Miami Dolphins	**L** 10–23	2–2	Giants Stadium	Recap
6	October 12	at New England Patriots	**L** 6–17	2–3	Gillette Stadium	Recap
7	October 19	**Philadelphia Eagles**	**L** 10–14	2–4	Giants Stadium	Recap
8	October 26	at Minnesota Vikings	**W** 29–17	3–4	Hubert H. Humphrey Metrodome	Recap
9	November 2	at New York Jets	**W** 31–28 (OT)	4–4	Giants Stadium	Recap
10	November 9	Atlanta Falcons	**L** 7–27	4–5	Giants Stadium	Recap
11	November 16	at **Philadelphia Eagles**	**L** 10–28	4–6	Lincoln Financial Field	Recap
12	November 24	at Tampa Bay Buccaneers	**L** 13–19	4–7	Raymond James Stadium	Recap
13	November 30	Buffalo Bills	**L** 7–24	4–8	Giants Stadium	Recap
14	December 7	**Washington Redskins**	**L** 7–20	4–9	Giants Stadium	Recap
15	December 14	at New Orleans Saints	**L** 7–45	4–10	Louisiana Superdome	Recap
16	December 21	at **Dallas Cowboys**	**L** 3–19	4–11	Texas Stadium	Recap
17	December 28	Carolina Panthers	**L** 24–37	4–12	Giants Stadium	Recap
Note: Intra-division opponents are in **bold** text.

=== Game summaries ===
==== Week 1: vs. St. Louis Rams ====
Week 1: St. Louis Rams at New York Giants – game summary

Quarter	1	2	3	4	Total
Rams	3	3	0	7	**13**
**Giants**	7	3	13	0	**23**

at Giants Stadium, East Rutherford, New Jersey

- Date: September 7
- Game time: 1:00 p.m. EDT
- Game weather: Sunny, 79 °F (26 °C)
- Game attendance: 78,666
- Referee: Tom White
- TV announcers (Fox): Dick Stockton, Daryl Johnston and Tony Siragusa

Game information

**First quarter**

- STL – Jeff Wilkins 39-yard field goal, 5:02. Rams 3–0. **Drive: 4 plays, 2 yards, 1:28.**
- NYG – Kenny Holmes fumble recovery in the end zone (Matt Bryant kick), 2:10. Giants 7–3.

**Second quarter**

- NYG – Matt Bryant 24-yard field goal, 9:57. Giants 10–3. **Drive: 5 plays, 83 yards, 1:29.**
- STL – Jeff Wilkins 28-yard field goal, 3:18. Giants 10–6. **Drive: 6 plays, 28 yards, 2:52.**

**Third quarter**

- NYG – Matt Bryant 47-yard field goal, 8:45. Giants 13–6. **Drive: 8 plays, 25 yards, 4:32.**
- NYG – Brian Mitchell 1-yard run (Matt Bryant kick), 5:03. Giants 20–6. **Drive: 6 plays, 53 yards, 3:11.**
- NYG – Matt Bryant 44-yard field goal, 2:43. Giants 23–6. **Drive: 4 plays, 6 yards, 1:23.**

**Fourth quarter**

- STL – Torry Holt 37-yard pass from Kurt Warner (Jeff Wilkins kick), 14:03. Giants 23–13. **Drive: 8 plays, 74 yards, 3:40.**

**Top passers**

- STL – Kurt Warner – 34/54, 342 yards, TD, INT
- NYG – Kerry Collins – 14/26, 202 yards

**Top rushers**

- STL – Marshall Faulk – 9 rushes, 28 yards
- NYG – Tiki Barber – 24 rushes, 146 yards

**Top receivers**

- STL – Isaac Bruce – 8 receptions, 120 yards
- NYG – Amani Toomer – 2 receptions, 98 yards

After a 2002 season that saw the Giants defy expectations, they entered 2003 as bona fide playoff contenders, with a revamped special teams unit and a much healthier defense. The latter played a big role in their Week 1 win over the Rams, sacking two-time NFL MVP Kurt Warner six times and forcing four turnovers.

It wasn't an auspicious start, as they had consecutive first-quarter drives halted on fumbles by Tiki Barber and Ike Hilliard, which led to St. Louis taking an early lead on a 39-yard Jeff Wilkins field goal. But after a 53-yard punt by Jeff Feagles pinned the Rams at their own 6-yard line, Warner had the ball stripped as he was sacked by rookie William Joseph in the end zone, and it was recovered by Kenny Holmes for a touchdown to give New York a 7–3 lead.

Warner responded by completing 5-of-6 passes on the ensuing drive, while the Rams also converted on a fake field goal pass from Dane Looker to Brandon Manumaleuna, as they drove down to New York's 5. But on second down, Warner mishandled the snap from center and fumbled it away again to Holmes. Kerry Collins then unleashed a deep pass to Amani Toomer for a 77-yard gain, which led to a short Matt Bryant field goal. Trailing 10–3, Warner's day got worse, as another drive across midfield ended with a sack and forced fumble; Collins, however, gave the ball back to the Rams with a fumble of his own, and a pair of completions to Isaac Bruce led to another Wilkins field goal, making the score 10–6 at halftime.

Midway through the third quarter, New York led 13–6 when Barber ripped off runs of 15 and 22 yards, with Brian Mitchell cashing in from the 1. Two plays later, Warner's pass was intercepted and returned 34 yards by Omar Stoutmire, which led to Bryant's third field goal that put the Giants up 23–6.

Even as Barber rushed for 110 yards in the second half, Warner tried to rally St. Louis with a 37-yard pass to Torry Holt early in the fourth quarter, and then completed seven straight passes on the Rams' next drive. But on 4th-and-12 from New York's 30-yard line, Warner's pass to Marshall Faulk was stopped short of a first down by Will Allen, and his last fourth-down attempt was batted away at the line of scrimmage by Keith Hamilton, making a triumphant return after missing the last 10 games of the previous season with a torn right Achilles tendon, as well as an offseason arrest for drug possession.

Barber paced the Giants with 146 rushing yards, while the defense averted a fourth-quarter collapse that plagued them in the 2002 playoffs by harassing the woozy Warner into fumbling six times. He would be diagnosed with a "mild to moderate" concussion that apparently happened on a hard first-quarter sack by Michael Strahan.

==== Week 2: vs. Dallas Cowboys ====
Week 2: Dallas Cowboys at New York Giants – game summary

Quarter	1	2	3	4	OT	Total
**Cowboys**	7	13	6	6	3	**35**
Giants	7	0	7	18	0	**32**

at Giants Stadium, East Rutherford, New Jersey

- Date: September 15
- Game time: 9:00 p.m. EDT
- Game weather: Overcast, 72 °F (22 °C)
- Game attendance: 78,907
- Referee: Gerry Austin
- TV announcers (ABC): Al Michaels, John Madden and Lisa Guerrero

Game information

**First quarter**

- NYG – Ralph Brown 29-yard interception return (Matt Bryant kick), 7:21. Giants 7–0.
- DAL – Quincy Carter 8-yard run (Billy Cundiff kick), 3:06. Tied 7–7. **Drive: 7 plays, 53 yards, 4:15.**

**Second quarter**

- DAL – Billy Cundiff 37-yard field goal, 14:12. Cowboys 10–7. **Drive: 6 plays, 16 yards, 2:17.**
- DAL – Billy Cundiff 49-yard field goal, 7:41. Cowboys 13–7. **Drive: 6 plays, 30 yards, 3:26.**
- DAL – Alshermond Singleton 41-yard interception return (Billy Cundiff kick), 3:05. Cowboys 20–7.

**Third quarter**

- DAL – Billy Cundiff 42-yard field goal, 11:00. Cowboys 23–7. **Drive: 8 plays, 36 yards, 4:00.**
- NYG – Ike Hilliard 5-yard pass from Kerry Collins (Matt Bryant kick), 8:11. Cowboys 23–14. **Drive: 7 plays, 69 yards, 2:49.**
- DAL – Billy Cundiff 21-yard field goal, 4:53. Cowboys 26–14. **Drive: 6 plays, 69 yards, 3:18.**

**Fourth quarter**

- DAL – Billy Cundiff 36-yard field goal, 12:43. Cowboys 29–14. **Drive: 11 plays, 62 yards, 5:54.**
- NYG – Jeremy Shockey 1-yard pass from Kerry Collins (Matt Bryant kick), 9:54. Cowboys 29–21. **Drive: 6 plays, 69 yards, 2:49.**
- NYG – Amani Toomer 20-yard pass from Kerry Collins (Tiki Barber run), 6:20. Tied 29–29. **Drive: 3 plays, 64 yards, 1:12.**
- NYG – Matt Bryant 30-yard field goal, 0:11. Giants 32–29. **Drive: 9 plays, 40 yards, 2:48.**
- DAL – Billy Cundiff 52-yard field goal, 0:00. Tied 32–32. **Drive: 2 plays, 26 yards, 0:11.**

**Overtime**

- DAL – Billy Cundiff 25-yard field goal, 5:56. Cowboys 35–32. **Drive: 8 plays, 51 yards, 4:13.**

**Top passers**

- DAL – Quincy Carter – 25/40, 321 yards, INT
- NYG – Kerry Collins – 21/51, 265 yards, 3 TD, 2 INT

**Top rushers**

- DAL – Troy Hambrick – 23 rushes, 60 yards
- NYG – Tiki Barber – 15 rushes, 41 yards

**Top receivers**

- DAL – Terry Glenn – 8 receptions, 113 yards
- NYG – Amani Toomer – 7 receptions, 126 yards, TD

Off to a 1–0 start, the Giants—7.5-point favorites—hosted the Cowboys on Monday Night Football, which was also a homecoming for head coach Bill Parcells, who led them to championships in Super Bowl XXI and Super Bowl XXV during his eight-year tenure but was now coaching a hated division rival.

Both teams exchanged punts to begin the game before Quincy Carter began Dallas's second drive by throwing an interception to Ralph Brown, who dashed 29 yards for a touchdown and an early 7–0 lead.

However, it was all Cowboys for the rest of the first half, as a 20-yard pass to Terry Glenn and the running of Troy Hambrick led to Carter scrambling for an 8-yard touchdown; four plays later, Tiki Barber lost a fumble, which led to a 37-yard field goal by Billy Cundiff. With three rookies starting on the offensive line, Kerry Collins was frequently under duress, as the Giants failed to cross midfield on their first six possessions. Trailing 13–7, Collins was pressured and intercepted by Alshermond Singleton, who returned it 41 yards for his own pick-six.

Late in the second quarter, New York finally crossed midfield with a 40-yard pass to a diving Amani Toomer; but on 3rd-and-20 from Dallas's 42-yard line, Collins threw into double coverage and was picked off again, this time by rookie Terence Newman. In a two-minute drill, Carter hit Glenn for a 27-yard gain to put Dallas in field goal range; but after Larry Allen lost 10 yards on a holding penalty, Cundiff's 52-yard kick drifted wide left, keeping their halftime lead at 20–7.

However, Matt Bryant's opening kickoff of the second half went out of bounds, and Carter hit downfield passes to Antonio Bryant and rookie Jason Witten to put the Cowboys in the red zone. In wet conditions, Carter had the ball slip out of his hand on his next dropback, but he got on top of it to save the possession, leading to another Cundiff field goal.

Then the Giants offense finally struck paydirt when a deep pass from Collins to Toomer on a gadget play drew a pass interference on Roy Williams in the end zone; Barber lost four yards on the next play, but Collins then found Ike Hilliard for a touchdown. On the next two drives, however, Will Allen and Shaun Williams gave up their own long pass interference plays, which led to two more Cundiff field goals as the game slid into the fourth quarter.

Now down 29–14, New York was aided by Dallas penalties on consecutive plays that extended their drive, before Collins completed passes to Toomer and Tim Carter, then hit Jeremy Shockey for a 1-yard touchdown. The defense forced a punt, and a 38-yard pass to Hilliard led to a 20-yard touchdown toss from Collins to Toomer. The Giants then had a pair of two-point conversion fails nullified by pass interferences before Barber carried it in, tying the game at 29 with just over six minutes left.

After a punt exchange, the Giants took over at their own 48-yard line with three minutes remaining. Barber and Toomer picked up first downs to put them in field goal range; then on second down with 14 seconds to go, Jim Fassel sent out Matt Bryant for a 30-yard field goal. Eight months earlier, New York's season ended in part because of a bad snap on a potential game-winning field goal; this time, the snap, hold and kick were all good, putting the Giants up 32–29.

However, for the second time on the night, Bryant's bouncing squib kick rolled out of bounds just before the goal line, giving the Cowboys the ball on their own 40 with still 11 seconds left; Carter then found Antonio Bryant in between Williams and William Peterson for a 26-yard gain and out of bounds. Cundiff then blasted a 52-yard field goal good, tying the game at 32 and leaving the Giants Stadium crowd in stunned silence.

In overtime, Dallas neared field goal range before tackles for loss by Cornelius Griffin and Kenny Holmes forced them to punt; but the Giants went three-and-out, and after Allen dropped a potential interception, a 23-yard completion from Carter to former Giant Dan Campbell led to Cundiff converting his seventh kick of the night, resulting in a devastating 35–32 New York loss.

Cundiff earned NFC Special Teams Player of the Week honors, while the Giants saw a stirring 15-point fourth-quarter comeback collapse due to late defensive and special teams blunders, problems that had plagued them in 2002 and would persist in the coming weeks.

==== Week 3: at Washington Redskins ====
Week 3: New York Giants at Washington Redskins – game summary

Quarter	1	2	3	4	OT	Total
**Giants**	7	14	0	0	3	**24**
Redskins	3	0	7	11	0	**21**

at FedEx Field, Landover, Maryland

- Date: September 21
- Game time: 4:05 p.m. EDT
- Game weather: Partly cloudy, 77 °F (25 °C)
- Game attendance: 84,856
- Referee: Johnny Grier
- TV announcers (Fox): Dick Stockton and Daryl Johnston

Game information

**First quarter**

- WAS – John Hall 42-yard field goal, 8:37. Redskins 3–0. **Drive: 4 plays, 1 yards, 2:07.**
- NYG – Ike Hilliard 5-yard pass from Kerry Collins (Matt Bryant kick), 2:45. Giants 7–3. **Drive: 11 plays, 74 yards, 5:52.**

**Second quarter**

- NYG – Amani Toomer 54-yard pass from Kerry Collins (Matt Bryant kick), 5:41. Giants 14–3. **Drive: 5 plays, 80 yards, 2:41.**
- NYG – Ike Hilliard 5-yard pass from Kerry Collins (Matt Bryant kick), 0:19. Giants 21–3. **Drive: 11 plays, 57 yards, 2:41.**

**Third quarter**

- WAS – Darnerien McCants 4-yard pass from Patrick Ramsey (John Hall kick), 3:47. Giants 21–10. **Drive: 10 plays, 89 yards, 5:42.**

**Fourth quarter**

- WAS – Rod Gardner 6-yard pass from Patrick Ramsey (Ramsey-McCants pass), 2:27. Giants 21–18. **Drive: 9 plays, 73 yards, 1:43.**
- WAS – John Hall 33-yard field goal, 0:13. Tied 21–21. **Drive: 6 plays, 57 yards, 1:48.**

**Overtime**

- NYG – Matt Bryant 29-yard field goal, 10:45. Giants 24–21. **Drive: 9 plays, 83 yards, 4:15.**

**Top passers**

- NYG – Kerry Collins – 24/39, 276 yards, 3 TD
- WAS – Patrick Ramsey – 23/45, 348 yards, 2 TD, INT

**Top rushers**

- NYG – Tiki Barber – 28 rushes, 126 yards, TD
- WAS – Trung Canidate – 9 rushes, 46 yards

**Top receivers**

- NYG – Amani Toomer – 4 receptions, 81 yards, TD
- WAS – Laveranues Coles – 7 receptions, 105 yards

==== Week 5: vs. Miami Dolphins ====
Week 5: Miami Dolphins at New York Giants – game summary

Quarter	1	2	3	4	Total
**Dolphins**	0	13	0	10	**23**
Giants	0	10	0	0	**10**

at Giants Stadium, East Rutherford, New Jersey

- Date: October 5
- Game time: 1:00 p.m. EDT
- Game weather: Scattered clouds, 56 °F (13 °C)
- Game attendance: 78,863
- Referee: Jeff Triplette
- TV announcers (CBS): Greg Gumbel, Phil Simms and Armen Keteyian

Game information

**First quarter**

- No scoring plays.

**Second quarter**

- MIA – Olindo Mare 43-yard field goal, 14:47. Dolphins 3–0. **Drive: 4 plays, 0 yards, 0:41.**
- NYG – Tiki Barber 2-yard run (Matt Bryant kick), 9:16. Giants 7–3. **Drive: 4 plays, 16 yards, 1:29.**
- MIA – James McKnight 68-yard run (Olindo Mare kick), 7:39. Dolphins 10–7. **Drive: 3 plays, 79 yards, 1:37.**
- MIA – Olindo Mare 23-yard field goal, 1:29. Dolphins 13–7. **Drive: 9 plays, 41 yards, 3:14.**
- NYG – Matt Bryant 43-yard field goal, 0:00. Dolphins 13–10. **Drive: 9 plays, 69 yards, 1:29.**

**Third quarter**

- No scoring plays.

**Fourth quarter**

- MIA – Olindo Mare 48-yard field goal, 12:46. Dolphins 16–10. **Drive: 11 plays, 50 yards, 6:30.**
- MIA – Ricky Williams 1-yard run (Olindo Mare kick), 4:16. Dolphins 23–10. **Drive: 12 plays, 64 yards, 6:59.**

**Top passers**

- MIA – Jay Fiedler – 14/26, 167 yards
- NYG – Kerry Collins – 31/43, 276 yards, 3 INT

**Top rushers**

- MIA – James McKnight – 1 rush, 68 yards, TD
- NYG – Tiki Barber – 20 rushes, 71 yards, TD

**Top receivers**

- MIA – Randy McMichael – 2 receptions, 57 yards
- NYG – Jeremy Shockey – 11 receptions, 110 yards

==== Week 6: at New England Patriots ====
Week 6: New York Giants at New England Patriots – game summary

Quarter	1	2	3	4	Total
Giants	3	0	0	3	**6**
**Patriots**	7	0	10	0	**17**

at Gillette Stadium, Foxborough, Massachusetts

- Date: October 12
- Game time: 1:00 p.m. EDT
- Game weather: Light rain, 55 °F (13 °C)
- Game attendance: 68,436
- Referee: Bill Carollo
- TV announcers (Fox): Dick Stockton, Daryl Johnston and Tony Siragusa

Game information

**First quarter**

- NE – Matt Chatham 38-yard fumble return (Adam Vinatieri kick), 12:24. Patriots 7–0.
- NYG – Brett Conway 22-yard field goal, 8:09. Patriots 7–3. **Drive: 10 plays, 64 yards, 4:15.**

**Second quarter**

- No scoring plays.

**Third quarter**

- NE – Adam Vinatieri 28-yard field goal, 10:39. Patriots 10–3. **Drive: 9 plays, 63 yards, 4:21.**
- NE – Mike Cloud 1-yard run (Adam Vinatieri kick), 4:22. Patriots 17–3. **Drive: 10 plays, 85 yards, 4:17.**

**Fourth quarter**

- NYG – Brett Conway 34-yard field goal, 13:42. Patriots 17–6. **Drive: 12 plays, 63 yards, 5:40.**

**Top passers**

- NYG – Kerry Collins – 35/59, 314 yards, 4 INT
- NE – Tom Brady – 8/21, 112 yards

**Top rushers**

- NYG – Tiki Barber – 22 rushes, 72 yards
- NE – Kevin Faulk – 14 rushes, 87 yards

**Top receivers**

- NYG – Jeremy Shockey – 8 receptions, 80 yards
- NE – David Patten – 3 receptions, 55 yards

==== Week 7: vs. Philadelphia Eagles ====
Week 7: Philadelphia Eagles at New York Giants – game summary

Quarter	1	2	3	4	Total
**Eagles**	7	0	0	7	**14**
Giants	0	3	7	0	**10**

at Giants Stadium, East Rutherford, New Jersey

- Date: October 19
- Game time: 1:00 p.m. EDT
- Game weather: Mostly cloudy, 54 °F (12 °C)
- Game attendance: 78,883
- Referee: Tom White
- TV announcers (Fox): Dick Stockton, Cris Collinsworth, Troy Aikman and Pam Oliver

Game information

**First quarter**

- PHI – Brian Westbrook 6-yard run (David Akers kick), 3:14. Eagles 7–0. **Drive: 10 plays, 89 yards, 6:29.**

**Second quarter**

- NYG – Brett Conway 39-yard field goal, 0:22. Eagles 7–3. **Drive: 4 plays, 8 yards, 1:01.**

**Third quarter**

- NYG – Jeremy Shockey 1-yard pass from Kerry Collins (Brett Conway kick), 5:19. Giants 10–7. **Drive: 12 plays, 62 yards, 4:58.**

**Fourth quarter**

- PHI – Brian Westbrook 84-yard punt return (David Akers kick), 1:16. Eagles 14–10.

**Top passers**

- PHI – Donovan McNabb – 9/23, 64 yards, INT
- NYG – Kerry Collins – 22/36, 174 yards, TD

**Top rushers**

- PHI – Brian Westbrook – 15 rushes, 67 yards, TD
- NYG – Tiki Barber – 19 rushes, 79 yards

**Top receivers**

- PHI – L. J. Smith – 1 reception, 25 yards
- NYG – Amani Toomer – 4 receptions, 54 yards

==== Week 8: at Minnesota Vikings ====
Week 8: New York Giants at Minnesota Vikings – game summary

Quarter	1	2	3	4	Total
**Giants**	7	6	3	13	**29**
Vikings	3	7	7	0	**17**

at Hubert H. Humphrey Metrodome, Minneapolis, Minnesota

- Date: October 26
- Game time: 1:00 p.m. EST/12:00 p.m. CST
- Game weather: None (indoor stadium)
- Game attendance: 64,114
- Referee: Tony Corrente
- TV announcers (Fox): Dick Stockton, Cris Collinsworth, Troy Aikman and Pam Oliver

Game information

**First quarter**

- MIN – Aaron Elling 51-yard field goal, 10:12. Vikings 3–0. **Drive: 8 plays, 40 yards, 4:48.**
- NYG – Ike Hilliard 19-yard pass from Kerry Collins (Brett Conway kick), 7:19. Giants 7–3. **Drive: 6 plays, 76 yards, 2:53.**

**Second quarter**

- NYG – Brett Conway 20-yard field goal, 3:31. Giants 10–3. **Drive: 7 plays, 54 yards, 3:12.**
- MIN – Randy Moss 33-yard pass from Daunte Culpepper (Aaron Elling kick), 1:53. Tied 10–10. **Drive: 4 plays, 79 yards, 1:38.**
- NYG – Brett Conway 44-yard field goal, 0:04. Giants 13–10. **Drive: 11 plays, 62 yards, 1:49.**

**Third quarter**

- NYG – Brett Conway 37-yard field goal, 13:14. Giants 16–10. **Drive: 5 plays, 53 yards, 1:46.**
- MIN – Randy Moss 1-yard pass from Daunte Culpepper (Aaron Elling kick), 6:22. Vikings 17–16. **Drive: 7 plays, 47 yards, 3:09.**

**Fourth quarter**

- NYG – Tiki Barber 2-yard run (pass failed), 5:29. Giants 22–17. **Drive: 6 plays, 80 yards, 2:58.**
- NYG – Ike Hilliard 14-yard pass from Kerry Collins (Brett Conway kick), 3:39. Giants 29–17. **Drive: 3 plays, 17 yards, 1:36.**

**Top passers**

- NYG – Kerry Collins – 23/39, 375 yards, 2 TD, INT
- MIN – Daunte Culpepper – 18/31, 241 yards, 2 TD, 2 INT

**Top rushers**

- NYG – Tiki Barber – 20 rushes, 75 yards, TD
- MIN – Moe Williams – 11 rushes, 69 yards

**Top receivers**

- NYG – Ike Hilliard – 9 receptions, 100 yards, 2 TD
- MIN – Randy Moss – 7 receptions, 125 yards, 2 TD

==== Week 9: at New York Jets ====
Week 9: New York Giants at New York Jets – game summary

Quarter	1	2	3	4	OT	Total
**Giants**	0	13	7	8	3	**31**
Jets	7	0	7	14	0	**28**

at Giants Stadium, East Rutherford, New Jersey

- Date: November 2
- Game time: 1:00 p.m. EST
- Game weather: Scattered clouds, 56 °F (13 °C)
- Game attendance: 78,132
- Referee: Johnny Grier
- TV announcers (Fox): Kenny Albert and Brian Baldinger

Game information

**First quarter**

- NYJ – Santana Moss 8-yard pass from Chad Pennington (Doug Brien kick), 7:48. Jets 7–0. **Drive: 11 plays, 60 yards, 5:47.**

**Second quarter**

- NYG – Brett Conway 39-yard field goal, 13:47. Jets 7–3. **Drive: 5 plays, 15 yards, 1:31.**
- NYG – Amani Toomer 39-yard pass from Kerry Collins (Brett Conway kick), 11:53. Giants 10–7. **Drive: 2 plays, 58 yards, 0:38.**
- NYG – Brett Conway 36-yard field goal, 0:22. Giants 13–7. **Drive: 6 plays, 20 yards, 1:38.**

**Third quarter**

- NYJ – Santana Moss 25-yard pass from Chad Pennington (Doug Brien kick), 9:06. Jets 14–13. **Drive: 12 plays, 75 yards, 5:54.**
- NYG – Ike Hilliard 6-yard pass from Kerry Collins (Brett Conway kick), 3:10. Giants 20–14. **Drive: 12 plays, 75 yards, 5:56.**

**Fourth quarter**

- NYG – Dorsey Levens 3-yard run (Collins run), 9:58. Giants 28–14. **Drive: 7 plays, 41 yards, 3:33.**
- NYJ – Santana Moss 11-yard pass from Chad Pennington (Doug Brien kick), 5:59. Giants 28–21. **Drive: 9 plays, 67 yards, 3:59.**
- NYJ – Anthony Becht 9-yard pass from Chad Pennington (Doug Brien kick), 0:29. Tied 28–28. **Drive: 12 plays, 86 yards, 2:38.**

**Overtime**

- NYG – Brett Conway 29-yard field goal, 0:04. Giants 31–28. **Drive: 8 plays, 53 yards, 3:50.**

**Top passers**

- NYG – Kerry Collins – 24/40, 303 yards, 2 TD
- NYJ – Chad Pennington – 27/45, 281 yards, 4 TD, 2 INT

**Top rushers**

- NYG – Tiki Barber – 21 rushes, 77 yards
- NYJ – Curtis Martin – 28 rushes, 108 yards

**Top receivers**

- NYG – Amani Toomer – 6 receptions, 127 yards, TD
- NYJ – Santana Moss – 10 receptions, 121 yards, 3 TD

==== Week 10: vs. Atlanta Falcons ====
Week 10: Atlanta Falcons at New York Giants – game summary

Quarter	1	2	3	4	Total
**Falcons**	7	0	13	7	**27**
Giants	0	7	0	0	**7**

at Giants Stadium, East Rutherford, New Jersey

- Date: November 9
- Game time: 1:00 p.m. EST
- Game weather: Sunny, 41 °F (5 °C)
- Game attendance: 78,813
- Referee: Walt Anderson
- TV announcers (Fox): Sam Rosen, Bill Maas and Chris Myers

Game information

**First quarter**

- ATL – Warrick Dunn 45-yard run (Jay Feely kick), 11:27. Falcons 7–0. **Drive: 6 plays, 68 yards, 3:33.**

**Second quarter**

- NYG – Dorsey Levens 2-yard run (Brett Conway kick), 8:31. Tied 7–7. **Drive: 10 plays, 72 yards, 4:48.**

**Third quarter**

- ATL – Justin Griffith 4-yard pass from Kurt Kittner (Jay Feely kick), 5:24. Falcons 14–7. **Drive: 9 plays, 77 yards, 5:22.**
- ATL – T. J. Duckett 1-yard run (kick failed), 2:54. Falcons 20–7. **Drive: 4 plays, 8 yards, 1:37.**

**Fourth quarter**

- ATL – T. J. Duckett 12-yard run (Jay Feely kick), 2:16. Falcons 27–7. **Drive: 7 plays, 40 yards, 2:12.**

**Top passers**

- ATL – Kurt Kittner – 9/23, 65 yards, TD
- NYG – Kerry Collins – 25/40, 202 yards, 2 INT

**Top rushers**

- ATL – Warrick Dunn – 25 rushes, 178 yards, TD
- NYG – Tiki Barber – 16 rushes, 120 yards

**Top receivers**

- ATL – Peerless Price – 3 receptions, 37 yards
- NYG – Tim Carter – 4 receptions, 56 yards

==== Week 11: at Philadelphia Eagles ====
Week 11: New York Giants at Philadelphia Eagles – game summary

Quarter	1	2	3	4	Total
Giants	3	0	0	7	**10**
**Eagles**	7	7	7	7	**28**

at Lincoln Financial Field, Philadelphia, Pennsylvania

- Date: November 16
- Game time: 1:00 p.m. EST
- Game weather: Mostly cloudy, 53 °F (12 °C)
- Game attendance: 67,867
- Referee: Bernie Kukar
- TV announcers (Fox): Dick Stockton, Daryl Johnston and Tony Siragusa

Game information

**First quarter**

- NYG – Matt Bryant 30-yard field goal, 12:41. Giants 3–0. **Drive: 4 plays, 9 yards, 2:19.**
- PHI – Correll Buckhalter 1-yard run (David Akers kick), 4:27. Eagles 7–3. **Drive: 9 plays, 61 yards, 5:05.**

**Second quarter**

- PHI – Brian Westbrook 29-yard pass from Donovan McNabb (David Akers kick), 3:36. Eagles 14–3. **Drive: 3 plays, 73 yards, 1:36.**

**Third quarter**

- PHI – Brian Westbrook 4-yard run (David Akers kick), 3:21. Eagles 21–3. **Drive: 8 plays, 95 yards, 4:31.**

**Fourth quarter**

- NYG – Tiki Barber 10-yard pass from Kerry Collins (Matt Bryant kick), 12:54. Eagles 21–10. **Drive: 11 plays, 79 yards, 5:27.**
- PHI – Brian Westbrook 5-yard pass from Donovan McNabb (David Akers kick), 5:26. Eagles 28–10. **Drive: 5 plays, 55 yards, 3:02.**

**Top passers**

- NYG – Kerry Collins – 25/44, 268 yards, TD, INT
- PHI – Donovan McNabb – 24/30, 314 yards, 2 TD

**Top rushers**

- NYG – Tiki Barber – 19 rushes, 111 yards
- PHI – Brian Westbrook – 9 rushes, 48 yards, TD

**Top receivers**

- NYG – David Tyree – 5 receptions, 106 yards
- PHI – Brian Westbrook – 5 receptions, 60 yards, 2 TD

==== Week 12: at Tampa Bay Buccaneers ====
Week 12: New York Giants at Tampa Bay Buccaneers – game summary

Quarter	1	2	3	4	Total
Giants	0	3	3	7	**13**
**Buccaneers**	0	14	3	2	**19**

at Raymond James Stadium, Tampa, Florida

- Date: November 24
- Game time: 9:00 p.m. EST
- Game weather: Partly cloudy, 70 °F (21 °C)
- Game attendance: 65,648
- Referee: Terry McAulay
- TV announcers (ABC): Al Michaels, John Madden and Lisa Guerrero

Game information

**First quarter**

- No scoring plays.

**Second quarter**

- TB – Thomas Jones 1-yard run (Martin Gramatica kick), 11:21. Buccaneers 7–0. **Drive: 10 plays, 43 yards, 5:11.**
- NYG – Matt Bryant 30-yard field goal, 6:37. Buccaneers 7–3. **Drive: 8 plays, 48 yards, 3:01.**
- TB – Charles Lee 53-yard pass from Brad Johnson (Martin Gramatica kick), 3:37. Buccaneers 14–3. **Drive: 6 plays, 73 yards, 3:00.**

**Third quarter**

- NYG – Matt Bryant 30-yard field goal, 9:22. Buccaneers 14–6. **Drive: 8 plays, 39 yards, 3:29.**
- TB – Martin Gramatica 21-yard field goal, 3:45. Buccaneers 17–6. **Drive: 10 plays, 71 yards, 5:37.**

**Fourth quarter**

- NYG – Frank Walker 56-yard interception return (Matt Bryant kick), 12:42. Buccaneers 17–13.
- TB – Carson Dach fumble out of bounds in end zone for a safety, 1:57. Buccaneers 19–13

**Top passers**

- NYG – Kerry Collins – 18/34, 160 yards, 2 INT
- TB – Brad Johnson – 22/32, 269 yards, TD, INT

**Top rushers**

- NYG – Tiki Barber – 13 rushes, 55 yards
- TB – Michael Pittman – 19 rushes, 55 yards

**Top receivers**

- NYG – Ike Hilliard – 4 receptions, 43 yards
- TB – Charles Lee – 5 receptions, 91 yards, TD

==== Week 13: vs. Buffalo Bills ====
Week 13: Buffalo Bills at New York Giants – game summary

Quarter	1	2	3	4	Total
**Bills**	0	17	7	0	**24**
Giants	0	7	0	0	**7**

at Giants Stadium, East Rutherford, New Jersey

- Date: November 30
- Game time: 1:00 p.m. EST
- Game weather: Sunny, 46 °F (8 °C)
- Game attendance: 78,481
- Referee: Bill Carollo
- TV announcers (CBS): Gus Johnson and Brent Jones

Game information

**First quarter**

- No scoring plays.

**Second quarter**

- BUF – Dave Moore 24-yard pass from Drew Bledsoe (Rian Lindell kick), 14:49. Bills 7–0. **Drive: 6 plays, 73 yards, 1:57.**
- NYG – Amani Toomer 77-yard pass from Kerry Collins (Matt Bryant kick), 14:32. Tied 7–7. **Drive: 1 play, 77 yards, 0:17.**
- BUF – Rian Lindell 26-yard field goal, 9:26. Bills 10–7. **Drive: 10 plays, 65 yards, 5:06.**
- BUF – Bobby Shaw 22-yard pass from Drew Bledsoe (Rian Lindell kick), 4:07. Bills 17–7. **Drive: 7 plays, 41 yards, 3:50.**

**Third quarter**

- BUF – Travis Henry 13-yard run (Rian Lindell kick), 5:30. Bills 24–7. **Drive: 7 plays, 66 yards, 3:54.**

**Fourth quarter**

- No scoring plays.

**Top passers**

- BUF – Drew Bledsoe – 19/29, 252 yards, 2 TD
- NYG – Kerry Collins – 17/35, 233 yards, TD

**Top rushers**

- BUF – Travis Henry – 26 rushes, 113 yards, TD
- NYG – Tiki Barber – 12 rushes, 20 yards

**Top receivers**

- BUF – Bobby Shaw – 4 receptions, 87 yards, TD
- NYG – Amani Toomer – 3 receptions, 110 yards, TD

==== Week 14: vs. Washington Redskins ====
Week 14: Washington Redskins at New York Giants – game summary

Quarter	1	2	3	4	Total
**Redskins**	3	7	7	3	**20**
Giants	7	0	0	0	**7**

at Giants Stadium, East Rutherford, New Jersey

- Date: December 7
- Game time: 1:00 p.m. EST
- Game weather: Partly cloudy, 28 °F (−2 °C)
- Game attendance: 78,217
- Referee: Walt Coleman
- TV announcers (Fox): Kenny Albert, Brian Baldinger and Lou Holder

Game information

**First quarter**

- WAS – John Hall 28-yard field goal, 10:52. Redskins 3–0. **Drive: 7 plays, 17 yards, 3:34.**
- NYG – Dorsey Levens 5-yard run (Matt Bryant kick), 2:14. Giants 7–3. **Drive: 7 plays, 35 yards, 3:19.**

**Second quarter**

- WAS – Darnerien McCants 6-yard pass from Tim Hasselbeck (John Hall kick), 14:02. Redskins 10–7. **Drive: 6 plays, 34 yards, 3:12.**

**Third quarter**

- WAS – Rod Gardner 7-yard pass from Tim Hasselbeck (John Hall kick), 10:04. Redskins 17–7. **Drive: 9 plays, 80 yards, 4:56.**

**Fourth quarter**

- WAS – John Hall 41-yard field goal, 10:42. Redskins 20–7. **Drive: 6 plays, 16 yards, 2:03.**

**Top passers**

- WAS – Tim Hasselbeck – 13/19, 154 yards, 2 TD
- NYG – Jesse Palmer – 7/11, 83 yards

**Top rushers**

- WAS – Trung Canidate – 19 rushes, 69 yards
- NYG – Tiki Barber – 16 rushes, 99 yards

**Top receivers**

- WAS – Laveranues Coles – 4 receptions, 55 yards
- NYG – Tiki Barber – 3 receptions, 47 yards

==== Week 15: at New Orleans Saints ====
Week 15: New York Giants at New Orleans Saints – game summary

Quarter	1	2	3	4	Total
Giants	0	7	0	0	**7**
**Saints**	10	14	14	7	**45**

at Louisiana Superdome, New Orleans, Louisiana

- Date: December 14
- Game time: 8:30 p.m. EST/7:30 p.m. CST
- Game weather: None (indoor stadium)
- Game attendance: 68,399
- Referee: Pete Morelli
- TV announcers (ESPN): Mike Patrick, Paul Maguire, Joe Theismann and Suzy Kolber

Game information

**First quarter**

- NO – Joe Horn 50-yard pass from Aaron Brooks (John Carney kick), 13:01. Saints 7–0. **Drive: 5 plays, 64 yards, 1:59.**
- NO – John Carney 35-yard field goal, 7:03. Saints 10–0. **Drive: 8 plays, 35 yards, 3:40.**

**Second quarter**

- NYG – Visanthe Shiancoe 4-yard pass from Jesse Palmer (Matt Bryant kick), 13:05. Saints 10–7. **Drive: 5 plays, 39 yards, 2:19.**
- NO – Joe Horn 13-yard pass from Aaron Brooks (John Carney kick), 5:51. Saints 17–7. **Drive: 13 plays, 69 yards, 7:14.**
- NO – Fred Thomas 64-yard blocked field goal return (John Carney kick), 3:10. Saints 24–7.

**Third quarter**

- NO – Joe Horn 7-yard pass from Aaron Brooks (John Carney kick), 7:35. Saints 31–7. **Drive: 7 plays, 60 yards, 3:52.**
- NO – Jerome Pathon 26-yard pass from Aaron Brooks (John Carney kick), 7:24. Saints 38–7. **Drive: 1 play, 26 yards, 0:06.**

**Fourth quarter**

- NO – Joe Horn 18-yard pass from Aaron Brooks (John Carney kick), 14:55. Saints 45–7. **Drive: 6 plays, 89 yards, 3:22.**

**Top passers**

- NYG – Jesse Palmer – 15/26, 140 yards, TD
- NO – Aaron Brooks – 26/35, 296 yards, 5 TD

**Top rushers**

- NYG – Tiki Barber – 11 rushes, 37 yards
- NO – Deuce McAllister – 15 rushes, 80 yards

**Top receivers**

- NYG – David Tyree – 1 reception, 39 yards
- NO – Joe Horn – 9 receptions, 133 yards, 4 TD

==== Week 16: at Dallas Cowboys ====
Week 16: New York Giants at Dallas Cowboys – game summary

Quarter	1	2	3	4	Total
Giants	3	0	0	0	**3**
**Cowboys**	10	3	3	3	**19**

at Texas Stadium, Irving, Texas

- Date: December 21
- Game time: 1:00 p.m. EST/12:00 p.m. CST
- Game weather: Mostly cloudy, 63 °F (17 °C)
- Game attendance: 64,118
- Referee: Mike Carey
- TV announcers (Fox): Dick Stockton, Daryl Johnston and Tony Siragusa

Game information

**First quarter**

- DAL – Billy Cundiff 24-yard field goal, 12:52. Cowboys 3–0. **Drive: 5 plays, 62 yards, 2:08.**
- NYG – Matt Bryant 45-yard field goal, 9:03. Tied 3–3. **Drive: 9 plays, 45 yards, 3:49.**
- DAL – Jason Witten 36-yard pass from Quincy Carter (Billy Cundiff kick), 2:22. Cowboys 10–3. **Drive: 6 plays, 86 yards, 3:06.**

**Second quarter**

- DAL – Billy Cundiff 42-yard field goal, 0:00. Cowboys 13–3. **Drive: 5 plays, 14 yards, 0:26.**

**Third quarter**

- DAL – Billy Cundiff 21-yard field goal, 10:03. Cowboys 16–3. **Drive: 6 plays, 19 yards, 3:17.**

**Fourth quarter**

- DAL – Billy Cundiff 49-yard field goal, 11:23. Cowboys 19–3. **Drive: 13 plays, 52 yards, 6:44.**

**Top passers**

- NYG – Jesse Palmer – 18/32, 190 yards
- DAL – Quincy Carter – 17/25, 240 yards, TD

**Top rushers**

- NYG – Tiki Barber – 13 rushes, 47 yards
- DAL – Troy Hambrick – 12 rushes, 36 yards

**Top receivers**

- NYG – Amani Toomer – 5 receptions, 66 yards
- DAL – Terry Glenn – 5 receptions, 64 yards

==== Week 17: vs. Carolina Panthers ====
Week 17: Carolina Panthers at New York Giants – game summary

Quarter	1	2	3	4	Total
**Panthers**	17	13	7	0	**37**
Giants	0	10	7	7	**24**

at Giants Stadium, East Rutherford, New Jersey

- Date: December 28
- Game time: 4:05 p.m. EST
- Game weather: Clear, 48 °F (9 °C)
- Game attendance: 78,130
- Referee: Bernie Kukar
- TV announcers (Fox): Curt Menefee, Tim Green and Brian Kilmeade

Game information

**First quarter**

- CAR – Steve Smith 53-yard punt return (John Kasay kick), 9:46. Panthers 7–0.
- CAR – John Kasay 42-yard field goal, 1:56. Panthers 10–0. **Drive: 9 plays, 63 yards, 4:41.**
- CAR – Ricky Manning 27-yard interception return (John Kasay kick), 0:51. Panthers 17–0.

**Second quarter**

- CAR – John Kasay 33-yard field goal, 13:19. Panthers 20–0. **Drive: 4 plays, 4 yards, 1:29.**
- NYG – Matt Bryant 28-yard field goal, 8:57. Panthers 20–3. **Drive: 11 plays, 58 yards, 4:22.**
- NYG – Amani Toomer 7-yard pass from Jesse Palmer (Matt Bryant kick), 7:50. Panthers 20–10. **Drive: 1 play, 7 yards, 0:05.**
- CAR – Muhsin Muhammad 1-yard pass from Jake Delhomme (John Kasay kick), 3:44. Panthers 27–10. **Drive: 4 plays, 37 yards, 1:58.**
- CAR – John Kasay 34-yard field goal, 0:00. Panthers 30–10. **Drive: 5 plays, 43 yards, 0:49.**

**Third quarter**

- NYG – Visanthe Shiancoe 1-yard pass from Jesse Palmer (Matt Bryant kick), 10:45. Panthers 30–17. **Drive: 1 play, 1 yard, 0:06.**
- CAR – Ricky Proehl 5-yard pass from Jake Delhomme (John Kasay kick), 4:22. Panthers 37–17. **Drive: 12 plays, 73 yards, 6:23.**

**Fourth quarter**

- NYG – Keith Washington fumble recovery in the end zone (Matt Bryant kick), 14:47. Panthers 37–24.

**Top passers**

- CAR – Jake Delhomme – 16/30, 191 yards, 2 TD, INT
- NYG – Jesse Palmer – 18/43, 110 yards, 2 TD, 4 INT

**Top rushers**

- CAR – Stephen Davis – 11 rushes, 57 yards
- NYG – Tiki Barber – 9 rushes, 40 yards

**Top receivers**

- CAR – Muhsin Muhammad – 5 receptions, 80 yards, TD
- NYG – Amani Toomer – 4 receptions, 47 yards, TD

== Standings ==
NFC East
	W	L	T	PCT	DIV	CONF	PF	PA	STK
^{(1)} Philadelphia Eagles	12	4	0	.750	5–1	9–3	374	287	W1
^{(6)} Dallas Cowboys	10	6	0	.625	5–1	8–4	289	260	L1
Washington Redskins	5	11	0	.313	1–5	3–9	287	372	L3
New York Giants	4	12	0	.250	1–5	3–9	243	387	L8

== See also ==
- List of New York Giants seasons
