= Cornell Green (offensive tackle) =

American football player (born 1976)

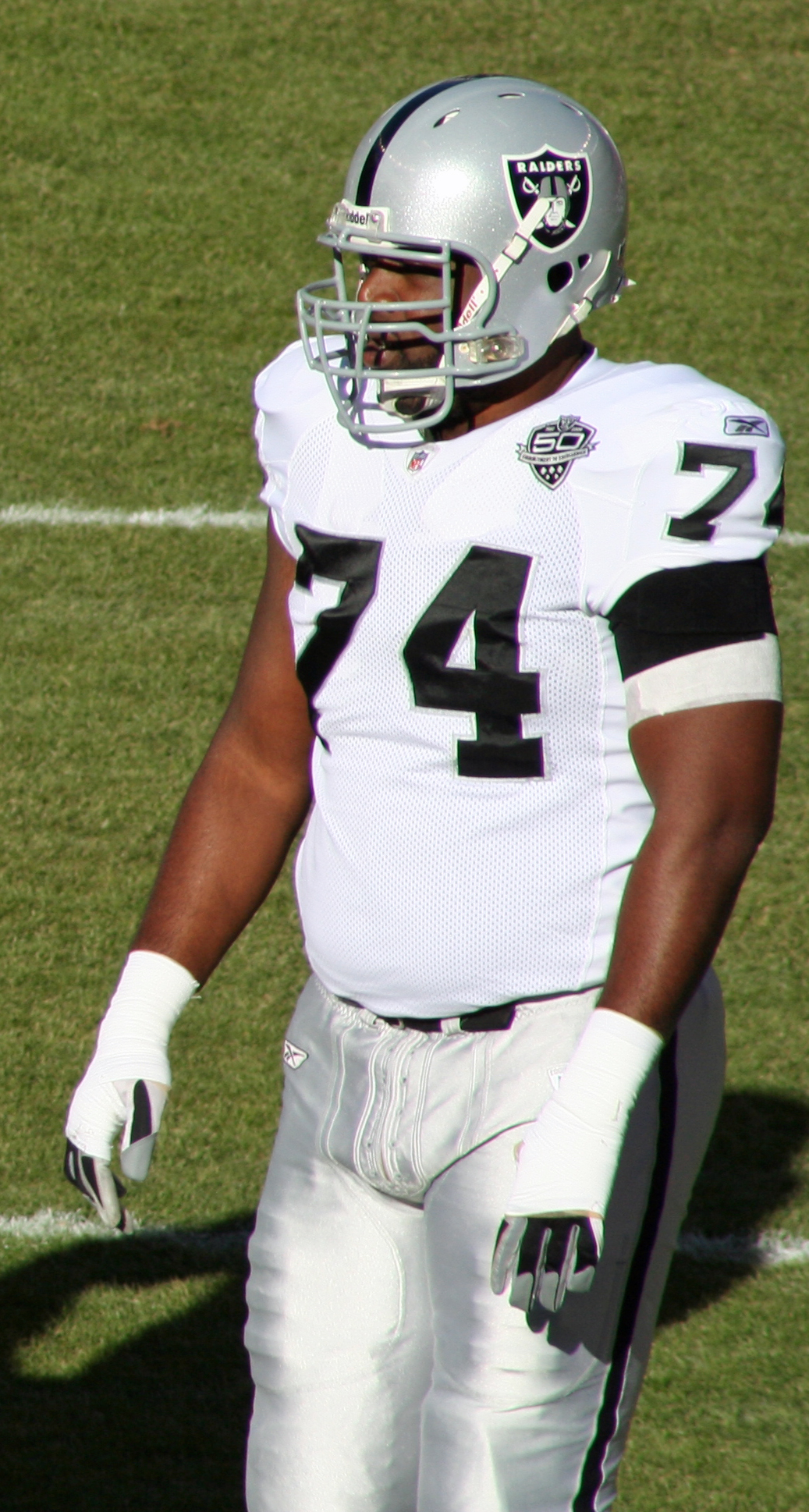
- Green with the Oakland Raiders in 2009

No. 74
- Position: Offensive tackle

Personal information
- Born: August 25, 1976 (age 50); St. Petersburg, Florida, U.S.
- Listed height: 6 ft 6 in (1.98 m)
- Listed weight: 315 lb (143 kg)

Career information
- High school: Lakewood (St. Petersburg)
- College: UCF
- NFL draft: 1999: undrafted

Career history
- Atlanta Falcons (1999)*; Scottish Claymores (2000); Washington Redskins (2000)*; New York Jets (2000–2001); Miami Dolphins (2001–2002)*; Tampa Bay Buccaneers (2002–2003); Denver Broncos (2004–2005); Tampa Bay Buccaneers (2006); Oakland Raiders (2007–2009); Buffalo Bills (2010)
- * Offseason or practice squad member only

Awards and highlights
- Super Bowl champion (XXXVII)

Career NFL statistics
- Games played: 94
- Games started: 51
- Stats at Pro Football Reference

Cornell Duane Green (born August 25, 1976) is an American former professional football player who was an offensive tackle in the National Football League (NFL). He was signed by the Atlanta Falcons as an undrafted free agent in 1999. He played college football for the UCF Knights where he was a four-year starter at offensive tackle. He played high school football at Pinellas Lakewood High.

Green was also a member of the Scottish Claymores, Washington Redskins, New York Jets, Miami Dolphins, Tampa Bay Buccaneers, Denver Broncos, Oakland Raiders, and Buffalo Bills. During his first of two stints with the Buccaneers, he earned a Super Bowl ring in Super Bowl XXXVII.

== College career ==
Green was a teammate of future NFL quarterback Daunte Culpepper at the University of Central Florida. The two would be teammates again in 2007 with the Oakland Raiders.

== Professional career ==
Pre-draft measurables
Height	Weight	40-yard dash	10-yard split	20-yard split	20-yard shuttle	Three-cone drill	Vertical jump	Broad jump	Bench press
6 ft 6 5/8 in (2.00 m)	325 lb (147 kg)	5.64 s	2.00 s	3.28 s	4.80 s	8.43 s	23.0 in (0.58 m)	7 ft 8 in (2.34 m)	18 reps
All values from NFL Combine

Green signed with the Buffalo Bills on March 8, 2010.
