= Center for Advanced Technologies =

Center for Advanced Technologies at Lakewood High School

Location
- 1400 54th Avenue South; St. Petersburg, Florida 33705; United States; 27.71927°N 82.6528°W

Information
- School type: Public, Magnet
- Established: 1990
- School district: Pinellas County Schools
- Administrator: Cristina Calderon
- Grades: 9th–12th
- Gender: Coeducational
- Enrollment: 400 (estimated 2017)
- Accreditation: Florida State Department of Education
- Website: www.cat.pcsb.org

The Center for Advanced Technologies (CAT) is a public magnet program in St. Petersburg, Florida, attached to Lakewood High School and part of the Pinellas County Schools district. Its primary focus is mathematics, science, and technology. It is a member of the National Consortium for Specialized Secondary Schools of Mathematics, Science and Technology (NCSSSMST) and is accredited by the Southern Association of Colleges and Schools. In its May 28 issue, Newsweek magazine ranked CAT at 24 in its 2007 list of the top 100 high schools in the nation. In 2010, CAT moved up to #15 in Newsweek magazine's list of top 100 high schools. CAT is currently among the global community of Microsoft Showcase Schools.

Every year, students must apply to enter the CAT program. Approximately 150 students enter into the program each year.

The focus of the CAT program is science and technology and thus all math and science classes are taught by CAT faculty. The rest of the students honors curriculum is provided by the traditional high school. This results in integration with traditional honors students. However, there are separate valedictorians and salutatorians.

== Overview ==
Under the direction of Fred Ulrich, along with five other faculty members came together to establish the CAT Program. CAT opened in 1990 with both freshman and sophomore students. In 1991, its own building was completed on the west side of campus on the site of the previous bus circle. In 1993, the initial sophomore class of seven students graduated. In 1994, first four-year class graduated with forty-three members.

== CATCOM Studios ==
The Center for Advanced Technologies Communications, CATCOM, a video production class and club a part of the program, produces a daily in-house 11 minute news program known as "Fast Forward". They also produce segments known as "Fox ThirTEEN Magazine," for the local Fox affiliate. Mark Granning, the former head and creator of CATCOM Studios retired in 2008. In dedication of Mark Granning's work, CATCOM studios name was changed to Mark W. Granning Studios.

As of the 2012–2013 school year, Fox ThirTEEN Magazine is no longer in production.

== Robotics ==
=== Heatwave 312 ===
The CAT program was home to Heatwave, the school's robotics team. Heatwave participated in the FIRST Robotics Competition, and has ranked in the top 3 in the nation. Heatwave is primarily sponsored by Baxter Healthcare. Students would build the robot in Baxter's machine shop. Mr. Paul Dickman supervised Heatwave.

History of Heatwave:

- 1995 (then U.S.FIRST) Lakewood was paired with Raytheon E-Systems.
- 1996 Lakewood continued with Raytheon E-Systems - They finished 2nd, losing by inches, at the FIRST Championship.
- 1997 Heatwave finished 2nd to the eventual National Champs, Beatty, at the Chicago Regional.
- 1998 Heatwave finished 6th at the Nationals as well as 6th at the Motorola Regional.
- 1999 At FIRST, Heatwave is at Kennedy Space Center Regional, Heatwave is in 4th Place

=== Current program ===
Currently CAT provides elective robotics courses to students of every year while also providing an extra-curricular robotics program. The courses and robotics teams are taught and supervised by Jason Ness. As of the 2013–14 school year there are three robotics teams that are currently competitors at the school: Next 3839, Clockwork 3029 and Aluminati 409.
