= Patrick Carter (American football) =

American football player (born 1985)

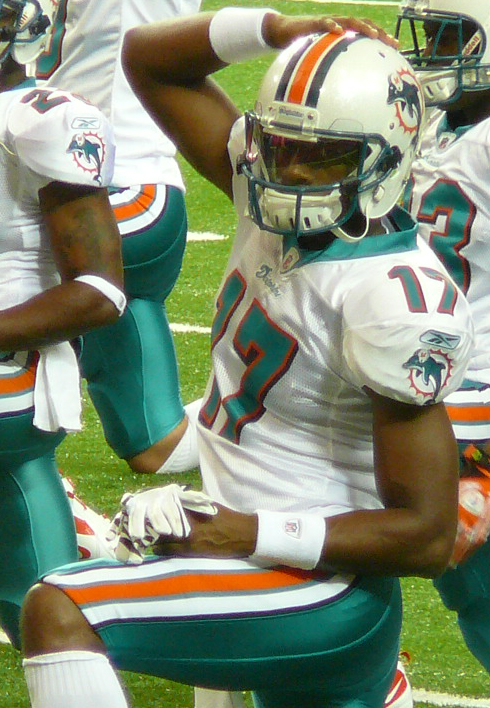
- Carter with the Miami Dolphins in 2011

No. 17, 16
- Position: Wide receiver

Personal information
- Born: February 6, 1985 (age 41); St. Petersburg, Florida, U.S.
- Listed height: 6 ft 3 in (1.91 m)
- Listed weight: 215 lb (98 kg)

Career information
- High school: Lakewood (St. Petersburg, Florida)
- College: Louisville
- NFL draft: 2008: undrafted

Career history
- Baltimore Ravens (2008)*; Tampa Bay Buccaneers (2009)*; Seattle Seahawks (2009–2010)*; Denver Broncos (2010)*; Hartford Colonials (2010); Miami Dolphins (2010–2011)*; Toronto Argonauts (2013)
- * Offseason or practice squad member only
- Stats at Pro Football Reference

Patrick Carter (born February 6, 1985) is an American former professional football wide receiver. He was signed by the Baltimore Ravens as an undrafted free agent in 2008. He played college football at Louisville.

Carter was also a member of the Tampa Bay Buccaneers, Seattle Seahawks, Denver Broncos, Hartford Colonials, Miami Dolphins, and Toronto Argonauts.

He is the younger brother of former New York Giants wide receiver Tim Carter.

== Early life ==
Patrick, like his older brother Tim, was selected as an Academic All-American at the University of Louisville. Patrick had notable achievements in football, track & field, and basketball. Patrick graduated from Lakewood High School in 2003.

=== Basketball ===
As a junior, he was the 6th man on the State Champion Lakewood High School team, with a record of 33–2. Patrick won the 6th man Award, and broke the state record for blocked shots.

=== Football ===
Patrick set seven Lakewood High School records as quarterback, including number of completions, total yards in a season, highest completion percentage, total touchdowns, total yards in a game, highest average yards per game, and tied the record for longest rush (99 yards) on a quarterback sneak. As a senior, he was ranked 12th in the nation as a dual-threat quarterback.

== College career ==
Carter attended Georgia Tech, where he played four out of five years as quarterback. In 2004, he played backup quarterback. During that same year, he also qualified for the indoor 60 metres in track & field. He also went to the ACC Indoor Championship.

In 2005, Carter transferred to Louisville. In 2006, he resumed playing as a wide receiver, and was later moved to quarterback. In the Orange Bowl that year, he threw the first and only touchdown pass (1st in Louisville BCS history).

While at Louisville, Carter also set track & field records for 55 metres, 60 metres, 100 meters and 200 metres dashes. During his senior year, he helped lead his team to win the Big East Track & Field Outdoor Championship, at times holding the record in both the 100m and 200m.

== NFL career ==
In 2007, Carter entered the NFL draft, and was signed as a Baltimore Ravens free agent. In 2008, Carter signed by the Tampa Bay Buccaneers, and played on the practice squad for the season. In 2009, Carter signed with the Seattle Seahawks and later traded to the Miami Dolphins where he played for two seasons before joining the CFL Toronto Argonauts, retiring in 2012.

== Post NFL career ==
Carter became the co-owner of Carter's Express, Inc. in 2011. The company contracted for FedEx and operated 20 delivery trucks. Carter sold the company in 2018 to join his wife, Brittney Carter, as a joint owner of Life's Purpose.

In 2017, Carter was hired as a defensive backs & wide receivers coach at The Kinkaid School in Houston, Texas.

In 2023, Carter was hired as senior analyst at the University of Mississippi with an emphasis on wide receivers.
