= Lakewood High School (Florida) =

Public high school in St. Petersburg, Florida, United States

Location
- 1400 54th Avenue South; St. Petersburg, Florida 33705; United States; 27.71927°N 82.6528°W

Information
- School type: Public, Secondary
- Established: 1966
- School district: Pinellas County Schools
- Principal: Connisheia Garcia
- Teaching staff: 47.00 (FTE)
- Grades: 9th–12th
- Gender: Coeducational
- Enrollment: 895 (2023–2024)
- Student to teacher ratio: 19.04
- Colors: Black & gold
- Mascot: Spartan
- Accreditation: Florida State Department of Education
- Newspaper: Spartan News Network (SNN) and CAT 5
- Yearbook: AlphaOmega
- Website: lakewood-hs.pcsb.org

Lakewood High School is a public high school in St. Petersburg, Florida operated by Pinellas County Schools. It opened in 1966 with students previously attending St. Petersburg High School and Boca Ciega High School. Lakewood High is one of the most highly funded schools in the county, due to the presence of Center for Advanced Technologies, a magnet program attached to Lakewood.

== Special programs ==
CATCOM (Center for Advanced Technologies Communications and Original Media), a video production class and club within the CAT program, was created by Mark Granning and Dr. Martin Shapiro in 1990. CATCOM Studios, now known as Mark W. Granning Studios following his retirement, produces a daily in-house 15-minute news program called Fast Forward and once produced award-winning segments, known as "FOX ThirTEEN Magazine," for the local Fox affiliate. CATCOM has won numerous Student Emmys for its work. Acceptance into the program is competitive, as only about 75 students may participate each year.

Also well known for the AMSET, Academy for Marine Science, program directed by James Kostka. Lakewood also recently added the CJAM, Center for Journalism and Multimedia program to its curriculum.

== Demographics ==
Lakewood HS is 65% Black, 25% White, 6% Hispanic, and 4% other.

== Notable alumni ==
- Rodney Adams '13, former NFL wide receiver
- Ricky Anderson, former NFL player
- Lynn Barry, '77, former basketball player, former Assistant Executive Director of USA women's basketball, former WNBA special advisor, former NCAA official
- Bo Bichette '16, MLB player for the Toronto Blue Jays
- Patrick Carter '03, former NFL wide receiver
- Tim Carter '98, former NFL wide receiver
- Tom Carter, former NFL defensive back
- Aveion Cason, former NFL running back
- Ryan Davis '15, NFL and CFL wide receiver
- William Floyd, former NFL fullback
- Dante Fowler '12, NFL defensive end and Linebacker for the Dallas Cowboys
- Jeff Frederick, former member of the Virginia House of Delegates and former chairman of the Republican Party of Virginia
- Ernest Givins, former NFL wide receiver
- Cornell Green '94, former NFL offensive tackle
- Jonte Green '07, former NFL cornerback for the Detroit Lions
- Shaquem Griffin '13, former NFL linebacker for the Seattle Seahawks
- Shaquill Griffin '13, NFL cornerback for the Minnesota Vikings
- Nicole Haislett '90, 1992 Two-time Olympic gold medal swimmer (Barcelona)
- Anthony Lawrence '15, professional basketball player who plays in Taiwan, played college basketball for the Miami Hurricanes
- Emmanuel McNeil-Warren, '22, college football player
- Yemiyah Morris, basketball player
- Rashod Moulton, former NFL cornerback
- Louis Murphy '05, former NFL wide receiver for the Tampa Bay Buccaneers
- Will Packer, movie producer, Stomp the Yard, This Christmas
- Bernard Reedy '10, former NFL wide receiver for the Tampa Bay Buccaneers
- Rose Richmond, 2004 USA Olympic team
- T. J. Tampa '20, NFL cornerback for the Baltimore Ravens
- Pat Terrell, former NFL defensive back
- Timothy L. Tyler, former prisoner sentenced to life without parole for breaking the Three-strikes law until being granted clemency by president Barack Obama.
- Marquez Valdes-Scantling '13, NFL wide receiver for the San Francisco 49ers
- Rod Wave '17, rapper and singer.
- Ken Welch, politician
- Isaiah Wynn '14, NFL offensive guard
