= Tim Carter (wide receiver) =

American football player (born 1979)

No. 84, 86, 15
- Position: Wide receiver

Personal information
- Born: September 21, 1979 (age 47); Atlanta, Georgia, U.S.
- Listed height: 6 ft 0 in (1.83 m)
- Listed weight: 187 lb (85 kg)

Career information
- High school: Lakewood (St. Petersburg, Florida)
- College: Auburn
- NFL draft: 2002: 2nd round, 46th overall pick

Career history
- New York Giants (2002–2006); Cleveland Browns (2007); Houston Texans (2008)*; St. Louis Rams (2009)
- * Offseason or practice squad member only

Career NFL statistics
- Receptions: 81
- Receiving yards: 1,090
- Receiving touchdowns: 4
- Stats at Pro Football Reference

Timothy M. Carter (born September 21, 1979) is an American former professional football player who was a wide receiver in the National Football League (NFL). He was selected by the New York Giants in the second round of the 2002 NFL draft. He played college football for the Auburn Tigers.

Carter was also a member of the Cleveland Browns, Houston Texans and St. Louis Rams.

== Early life ==
Carter attended Lakewood High School (St. Petersburg, Florida) and was a letterman in football and track. He is the 1998 Florida State Champion in the 100 meter dash with a time of 10.49 sec. He played youth football in the Pinellas Youth Football Conference in St. Petersburg, FL for the Azalea Bulldogs and Lakewood Junior Spartans.

== College career ==
Carter attended Auburn University. He was a two-year starter that originally played defensive back at Auburn. Led the team in receiving during his Senior year, totaling 35 catches for 570 yard (16.3 average) and three touchdowns while also averaging 23.9 yards returning kicks. As a junior, he registered 21 catches for 271 yards and one touchdown as a receiver with 19 returns for 243 yards and one touchdown returning kicks. Carter only caught a single pass as a sophomore after missing four games with an injured ankle. Carter ran track at Auburn competing in the 60 meter dash, 100 meter dash and was second leg on the 4x100 meter relay team that posted a time of 39.10 sec.

=== Track and field ===
==== Personal bests ====
Event	Time (seconds)	Venue	Date
60 meters	6.81	Lexington, Kentucky	February 24, 2001
100 meters	10.37	Athens, Georgia	May 5, 2001
200 meters	21.06	Athens, Georgia	May 5, 2001

== Professional career ==
=== Pre-draft ===
Pre-draft measurables
Height	Weight	40-yard dash	10-yard split	20-yard split	20-yard shuttle	Three-cone drill	Vertical jump	Broad jump
5 ft 11 7/8 in (1.83 m)	190 lb (86 kg)	4.32 s	1.52 s	2.53 s	3.93 s	6.68 s	39 in (0.99 m)	10 ft 6 in (3.20 m)
All values from NFL Combine.

=== New York Giants ===
The New York Giants drafted Carter with the 14th pick in the second round of the 2002 NFL Draft.

Tim Carter made his first reception, for 22 yards, of the 2006 season in the huge comeback against the Philadelphia Eagles in week two. During the game, he also scored his first touchdown of the season, on a fumble return after Plaxico Burress fumbled and the ball rolled into the end zone. Carter was again in the end zone the following week, with 3 receptions for 43 yards and a touchdown versus the Seattle Seahawks. Carter ended the season with 22 receptions for 253 yards and 3 touchdowns, despite garnering only 8 starts.

=== Cleveland Browns ===
He was traded on March 9, 2007, to the Cleveland Browns for running back Reuben Droughns. He went on to appear in all 16 games for the Browns during the 2007 season, catching eight passes for 117 yards and a touchdown. He became a free agent following the season.

=== Houston Texans ===
On May 22, 2008, Carter was signed by the Houston Texans. After suffering a concussion he was later released on August 26, 2008, by Houston and sat out the rest of the season to recover.

=== St. Louis Rams ===
In 2009 between May 1–3, Carter participated in a St. Louis Rams mini-camp on a tryout basis. On May 5, the Rams signed Carter to a one-year contract. He was released on September 5, 2009, and re-signed on October 12. He was waived on November 3 then he officially retired.

== Personal life ==
He and his wife Anastasia reside in Houston, Texas. Carter is the cousin of major league baseball players Gary Sheffield and Dwight Gooden, as well as fellow NFL players Darrin Nelson, Al Harris, and Carlos Carson. Tim's younger brother, Patrick Carter, was formerly a quarterback and wide receiver with Georgia Tech and the University of Louisville.
