= Keith Washington (American football) =

American football player (born 1972)

Profile
- Position: Defensive end

Personal information
- Born: December 18, 1972 (age 53); Dallas, Texas, U.S.

Career information
- College: UNLV

Career history
- 1995: Minnesota Vikings
- 1996: Detroit Lions
- 1997–2000: Baltimore Ravens
- 2001–2002: Denver Broncos
- 2003–2004: New York Giants

Awards and highlights
- Super Bowl champion (XXXV)
- Stats at Pro Football Reference

Keith LeMon Washington (born December 18, 1972, in Dallas, Texas) is an American former professional football player who was a defensive end for nine seasons in the National Football League (NFL) for the Detroit Lions, Baltimore Ravens, Denver Broncos, and the New York Giants. He played college football for the UNLV Rebels.
