= William James (American football) =

American football player (born 1979)

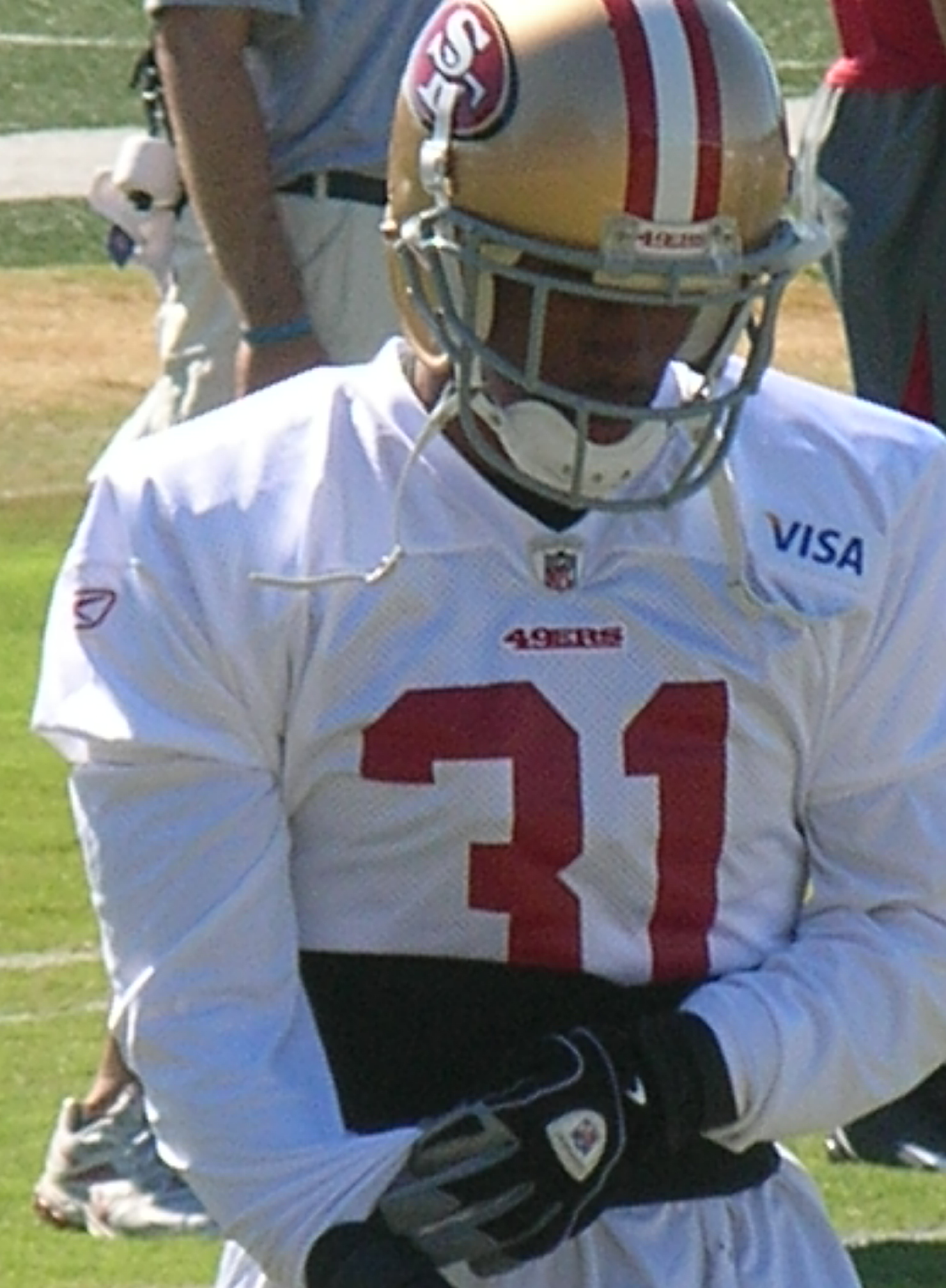
- James with the San Francisco 49ers in 2010

No. 24, 21, 22, 41, 31
- Position: Cornerback

Personal information
- Born: June 15, 1979 (age 47); Uniontown, Pennsylvania, U.S.
- Listed height: 6 ft 0 in (1.83 m)
- Listed weight: 200 lb (91 kg)

Career information
- High school: Laurel Highlands (Uniontown)
- College: Western Illinois
- NFL draft: 2001: 3rd round, 78th overall pick

Career history
- New York Giants (2001–2005); Philadelphia Eagles (2006–2007); Buffalo Bills (2008)*; Jacksonville Jaguars (2008); Detroit Lions (2009); San Francisco 49ers (2010)
- * Offseason or practice squad member only

Career NFL statistics
- Total tackles: 334
- Forced fumbles: 1
- Pass deflections: 50
- Interceptions: 8
- Defensive touchdowns: 1
- Stats at Pro Football Reference

William James (born William James Peterson Jr.; June 15, 1979) is an American former professional football player who was a cornerback in the National Football League (NFL). He was selected by the New York Giants in the third round of the 2001 NFL draft. He played college football for the Western Illinois Leathernecks.

James, who legally dropped the Peterson surname when he signed with the Philadelphia Eagles in 2006, also later played with the Buffalo Bills, Jacksonville Jaguars, Detroit Lions, and San Francisco 49ers.

== College career ==
James (then still William James Peterson) attended the University of Michigan for two years, studying fashion design. Playing with the Michigan Wolverines, he was a member of the 1997 national championship team. He was dismissed from the team near the end of the 1998 season, after being charged with theft of $46 from a stripper; the charge was later dropped, but he also pleaded guilty to possession of marijuana before that school year was over. At the time of the 2001 NFL draft, James acknowledged that he had been immature, making bad decisions, and pointed out that – after serving probation and community service on the possession conviction – his criminal record had been expunged.

James briefly attended Youngstown State in Ohio before finishing his collegiate career with a single season playing with the Western Illinois Leathernecks in 2000, starting 10 games. He finished his college career with 96 tackles (77 solo), nine interceptions, two sacks, and 11 tackles for losses. He averaged over 26 yards per interception return and scored two defensive touchdowns.

== Professional career ==
=== New York Giants ===
In his rookie NFL season with the Giants in 2001, James played in all sixteen games, starting in five of them. In 2002, he started all 12 games in which he played, but missed four due to injuries. In 2003, James started five games, but missed the rest of the season because of a stress fracture in his lower back. In 2004, James played in every regular season game for the Giants, and started fifteen of them. James was released by the Giants on Friday May 26, 2006; the Giants waived him because of severe back problems and health issues related to stress fractures in his lower back.

=== Philadelphia Eagles ===
James signed with the Philadelphia Eagles on October 30, 2006, and played with the team for two seasons before becoming a free agent in 2008.

=== Buffalo Bills ===
On March 18, 2008, James was signed by the Buffalo Bills to a two-year contract, but was released on August 30 during final cuts.

=== Jacksonville Jaguars ===
James was signed by the Jacksonville Jaguars on September 1, 2008. The Jacksonville Jaguars released William James on Thursday, June 11, 2009.

=== Detroit Lions ===
James signed with the Detroit Lions on July 28, 2009.

=== San Francisco 49ers ===
James was signed by the San Francisco 49ers on May 5, 2010. His contract expired at season's end, making him an unrestricted free agent.

== Personal life ==
=== Name change ===
In 2006, when he signed with the Eagles, James legally dropped Peterson as his surname, saying only that: "Things happened that have brought simplicity to my life, things that made me change. It just made sense at that time to change my name."
