= Carson Dach =

American football player (born 1980)

No. 57
- Position: Center

Personal information
- Born: September 29, 1980 (age 46); Flint, Michigan
- Listed height: 6 ft 1 in (1.85 m)
- Listed weight: 253 lb (115 kg)

Career information
- High school: Grand Blanc (MI)
- College: Eastern Michigan

Career history
- Chicago Bears (2003)*; New York Giants (2003)
- * Offseason or practice squad member only
- Stats at Pro Football Reference

Carson Dach (born September 29, 1980) is an American former football center. He played for the New York Giants in 2003.
