= Bob Toledo =

American football player and coach (born 1946)

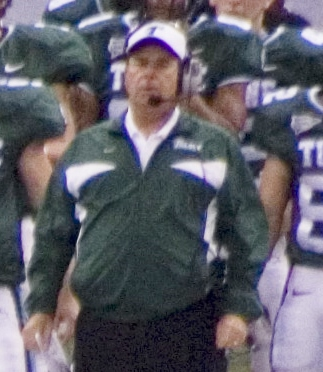
- Toledo coaches Tulane in 2007

Biographical details
- Born: March 4, 1946 (age 80); San Jose, California, U.S.

Playing career
- 1964: San Jose State
- 1965: San Jose City
- 1966–1967: San Francisco State
- Position: Quarterback

Coaching career (HC unless noted)
- 1969: Arch. Riordan HS (CA) (freshmen)
- 1970–1972: Arch. Riordan HS (CA)
- 1973: UC Riverside (OC)
- 1974–1975: UC Riverside
- 1976–1978: USC (DB)
- 1979–1982: Pacific (CA)
- 1983–1988: Oregon (OC)
- 1989–1993: Texas A&M (OC/QB)
- 1994–1995: UCLA (OC)
- 1996–2002: UCLA
- 2006: New Mexico (OC)
- 2007–2011: Tulane
- 2013–2014: San Diego State (OC)

Head coaching record
- Overall: 93–108 (college)
- Bowls: 1–2

Accomplishments and honors

Championships
- 2 CCAA (1974–1975); 2 Pac-10 (1997–1998)

Awards
- Second-team Little All-American (1967); Pac-10 Coach of the Year (1998)

Robert Anthony Toledo (born March 4, 1946) is an American former college football coach and player. Toledo served as the head coach at University of California, Riverside (1974–1975), the University of the Pacific (1979–1982), the University of California, Los Angeles (1996–2002), and Tulane University (2007–2011). He resigned as head football coach at Tulane on October 18, 2011. On January 10, 2013, he was named offensive coordinator at San Diego State University. Toledo retired from coaching after the 2014 season.

== Playing career ==
Toledo played football at Lincoln High School in San Jose, California. He was the starting quarterback from 1961 to 1963. Toledo played for San Jose State during the 1964 season. In 1965, Toledo transferred to San Jose City College, where he was the starting quarterback and was a junior college All-American. Toledo was the starting quarterback for the San Francisco State Gators during the 1966 and 1967 seasons. While at SFSU, the team went 16–5 and played in the 1967 Camellia Bowl, a defeat against Don Coryell's San Diego State Aztecs. Toledo graduated from San Francisco State in 1968 and then tried out for the San Francisco 49ers.

== Coaching career ==
Prior to coaching at the University of California, Riverside, Toledo was a head coach at Archbishop Riordan High School in San Francisco. He coached the freshman team in 1969, and the varsity team from 1970 to 1972. Toledo was the offensive coordinator for UC-Riverside in the 1973 season. In his first collegiate head coaching job, Toledo led UC-Riverside to a 15–6 record from 1974 to 1975. When UC-Riverside ended its football program after the 1975 season, Toledo worked as an assistant to John Robinson at USC. Toledo's second head coaching position was at the University of the Pacific from 1979 to 1982. At Pacific, his teams compiled a 14–30 overall record in those four years. After leaving the Pacific program, he worked from 1983 to 1988 as the assistant head coach and offensive coordinator at the University of Oregon. He assisted R. C. Slocum as the offensive coordinator and quarterbacks coach at Texas A&M, starting in 1989, until he was hired as offensive coordinator at UCLA for the 1994 and 1995 seasons. As the head coach at UCLA from 1996 until 2002, Toledo went 49–32 overall and 32–24 in conference play. The 2003 football season represented the first time since before high school that Toledo was neither playing nor coaching football. Toledo was the assistant head coach and offensive coordinator for the University of New Mexico in 2006, and was the head coach at Tulane from 2007 to 2011.

=== UCLA ===
In 1996, his first season as head coach with UCLA, the team finished with a mediocre 5–6 record. The highlight of the season was a comeback win over USC.

The 1997 team finished as co-champions of the Pacific-10 Conference with Washington State. However, with Washington State defeating the Bruins in the season opener, the Cougars earned the right to play in the Rose Bowl. The highlights of that season were a 66–3 win over the University of Texas and a victory at the Cotton Bowl Classic over Texas A&M, and a victory over USC.

The 1998 season started out as one of the best in the history of UCLA football. The team was high enough in the BCS standings to merit entry to the national championship game, and all UCLA needed to do was beat unranked Miami, who were major underdogs after a 66–13 loss to Syracuse the week before. UCLA was also coming off of their eighth consecutive victory over USC and 20th straight win overall. However, Miami won 49–45, ending UCLA's chances of playing in the national championship game. They instead settled for a trip to the Rose Bowl as Pac-10 champions, but lost to Wisconsin. This is seen as the turning point for both UCLA and USC's football programs.

The 1999 season was a major disappointment, with the team finishing 4–7. This was the first year that USC had defeated them in the annual Battle for the Victory Bell since 1990. The year also had the dubious distinction of a 55–7 loss to Pac-10 foe Oregon State, the worst defeat of the Bruins in 69 years.

In 2000, the Bruins finished 6–6 with a loss in the Sun Bowl, again against Wisconsin.

The 2001 season started with promise as the Bruins got off to a fast start with a 6–0 record. However, four straight losses to Stanford, Washington State, Oregon, and USC, the Bruins faded out of postseason contention.

UCLA finished off 8–5 in Toledo's final season in 2002. The team finished 7–5 in the regular season, but Toledo was fired after a fourth straight loss to USC. The Bruins did reach the Las Vegas Bowl, but interim coach Ed Kezirian coached—and won—his only game in charge of the program.

Toledo was the head coach at UCLA for seven years from 1996 to 2002. He finished with a record of 49 wins and 32 losses, for a winning percentage of .605, including one winning streak of 20 consecutive victories, a school record. Toledo's greatest accomplishment with the team may have been in the 1997 season, where the team finished 10–2 with a victory over Texas A&M in the Cotton Bowl Classic. Toledo was 3–4 against UCLA's cross-town rival, the USC Trojans in the UCLA–USC rivalry.

=== New Mexico ===
In 2006, Toledo returned to college football after a three-year absence becoming the offensive coordinator of the University of New Mexico Lobos, under head coach Rocky Long who had previously been Toledo's defensive coordinator at UCLA for the 1996 and 1997 seasons. In addition to being the offensive coordinator, Toledo was also the associate head coach and quarterbacks coach.

=== Tulane ===
In December 2006, Toledo was named the new head football coach at Tulane, replacing Chris Scelfo. The team finished with a record of four wins and eight losses in Toledo's first season as coach. His first year also saw the development of Matt Forte, who came off a knee injury to rush for 2,127 yards and 23 touchdowns.

Toledo resigned as head football coach at Tulane on October 18, 2011, and was replaced on an interim basis by co-offensive coordinator Mark Hutson.

== Head coaching record ==
Year	Team	Overall	Conference	Standing	Bowl/playoffs	Coaches^{#}	AP^{°}
UC Riverside Highlanders (California Collegiate Athletic Association) (1974–1975)
1974	UC Riverside	8–3	4–0	1st			
1975	UC Riverside	7–3	4–0	1st			
UC Riverside:		15–6	8–0				
Pacific Tigers (Pacific Coast Athletic Association) (1979–1982)
1979	Pacific	3–7	0–5	6th			
1980	Pacific	4–8	1–4	T–4th			
1981	Pacific	5–6	2–3	T–3rd			
1982	Pacific	2–9	2–4	5th			
Pacific:		14–30	5–15				
UCLA Bruins (Pacific-10 Conference) (1996–2002)
1996	UCLA	5–6	4–4	4th			
1997	UCLA	10–2	7–1	T–1st	W Cotton	5	5
1998	UCLA	10–2	8–0	1st	L Rose^{†}	8	8
1999	UCLA	4–7	2–6	9th			
2000	UCLA	6–6	3–5	T–5th	L Sun		
2001	UCLA	7–4	4–4	6th			
2002	UCLA	7–5	4–4	T–4th	Las Vegas^{1}		
UCLA:		49–32	32–24				
Tulane Green Wave (Conference USA) (2007–2011)
2007	Tulane	4–8	3–5	3rd (West)			
2008	Tulane	2–10	1–7	5th (West)			
2009	Tulane	3–9	1–7	6th (West)			
2010	Tulane	4–8	2–6	6th (West)			
2011	Tulane	2–5^{2}	1–2				
Tulane:		15–40	7–25				
Total:		93–108					
National championship Conference title Conference division title or championship game berth
^{†}Indicates BCS bowl.; ^{#}Rankings from final Coaches Poll.; ^{°}Rankings from final AP Poll.; ^{1} Ed Kezirian coached the bowl game. ^{2} Toledo resigned after the seventh game. Co-offensive coordinator Mark Hutson became interim head coach.
