= 2001 Arizona Wildcats football team =

American college football season

2001 Arizona Wildcats football
- Conference: Pacific-10
- Record: 5–6 (2–6 Pac-10)
- Head coach: John Mackovic (1st season)
- Offensive coordinator: Rick Dykes (1st season)
- Offensive scheme: Spread
- Defensive coordinator: Larry Mac Duff (11th season)
- Base defense: Double Eagle Flex
- Home stadium: Arizona Stadium

2001 Pacific-10 Conference football standings
	Conf.			Overall
Team	W		L	W		L
No. 2 Oregon $	7	–	1	11	–	1
No. 10 Washington State	6	–	2	10	–	2
No. 16 Stanford	6	–	2	9	–	3
No. 19 Washington	6	–	2	8	–	4
USC	5	–	3	6	–	6
UCLA	4	–	4	7	–	4
Oregon State	3	–	5	5	–	6
Arizona	2	–	6	5	–	6
Arizona State	1	–	7	4	–	7
California	0	–	8	1	–	10
$ – Conference champion; Rankings from AP Poll

The 2001 Arizona Wildcats football team represented the University of Arizona during the 2001 NCAA Division I-A football season. They were coached by John Mackovic in his first season with the Wildcats, replacing longtime coach Dick Tomey. Arizona finished the year with a record of 5–6 (2–6 against Pac-10 opponents) and again missed the postseason due to a losing record.

The season was mostly affected by the September 11 terrorist attacks, which led to the NCAA cancelling a week of college football in mid-September, and the Wildcats had to regroup and play the rest of the year with pride.

== Before the season ==
After Arizona completed the 2000 season, Tomey resigned as coach due to the inability to get the Wildcats to complete their goal of reaching the Rose Bowl. Arizona had started the season at 5–1, only to lose their remaining games, including the finale against Arizona State, which led to Tomey resigning, despite several rumors that he would be fired.

Mackovic, the former Illinois and Texas coach, was hired to replace Tomey to rebuild the program. After being introduced, Mackovic promised that the team would be rebuilt with strong recruiting classes and he would lead them to a Rose Bowl, in which Tomey was unable to do. He previously served as Arizona's offensive coordinator under Jim Young from 1973 to 1976.

In addition, Mackovic would also bring in a new coaching staff, as well as bringing back Larry Mac Duff as defensive coordinator (Mac Duff was formerly part of Tomey's staff in the same position and helped build Arizona's “Desert Swarm” defense in the early 1990s). Mac Duff served as the special teams for the NFL's New York Giants, who had reached the Super Bowl in the 2000–01 season (the Giants ultimately lost to the Ravens in the Super Bowl) before returning to Arizona in the offseason.

By the preseason, Arizona was picked to finish in the middle of the Pac-10 standings, though Mackovic was confident that the team would improve despite having a new quarterback.

== Schedule ==
Date	Time	Opponent	Site	TV	Result	Attendance
August 30	7:00 p.m.	at San Diego State*	Qualcomm Stadium; San Diego, CA	ESPN2	W 23–10	29,386
September 8	7:00 p.m.	Idaho*	Arizona Stadium; Tucson, AZ	FSNAZ	W 36–29	44,250
September 22	7:00 p.m.	UNLV*	Arizona Stadium; Tucson, AZ	KWBA	W 38–21	47,031
September 29	7:00 p.m.	Washington State	Arizona Stadium; Tucson, AZ	KWBA	L 21–48	42,729
October 6	7:15 p.m.	No. 7 Oregon	Arizona Stadium; Tucson, AZ	FSN	L 28–63	45,258
October 13	7:15 p.m.	at Oregon State	Reser Stadium; Corvallis, OR	FSN	L 3–38	36,619
October 20	3:30 p.m.	at No. 15 Washington	Husky Stadium; Seattle, WA	FSN	L 28–31	71,108
October 27	3:30 p.m.	USC	Arizona Stadium; Tucson, AZ	FSN	L 34–41	46,399
November 3	1:30 p.m.	at California	California Memorial Stadium; Berkeley, CA	FSN	W 38–24	26,222
November 10	5:00 p.m.	No. 16 Stanford^{†}	Arizona Stadium; Tucson, AZ	ABC	L 37–51	40,632
November 23	1:00 p.m.	at Arizona State	Sun Devil Stadium; Tempe, AZ (Territorial Cup)	FSN	W 34–21	55,831
*Non-conference game; ^{†}Homecoming; Rankings from AP Poll released prior to the game; All times are in Mountain time

== Roster ==
2001 Arizona Wildcats football team roster
Players
Coaches
Offense

Pos.	#	Name	Class
WR	1	Bobby Wade	Jr
WR	3	Andrae Thurman	So
RB	5	Larry Croom	Jr
WR	6	Brandon Marshall	Sr
WR	9	Gary Love	So
QB	10	Jason Johnson	Jr
QB	12	Nic Costa	Fr
QB	13	John Rattay	Fr
TE	14	Peter Hansen	Sr
QB	15	Cliff Watkins	So
WR	18	Lance Relford	So
RB	20	Leo Mills	Jr
RB	21	Tremaine Cox	Fr
RB	23	Gainus Scott	Fr
WR	25	Malosi Leonard	Sr
RB	26	Mike Bell	Fr
RB	32	Clarence Farmer	So
RB	34	Chris Harris	Fr
FB	35	Sean Jones	Fr
RB	36	Anthony Fulcher	So
WR	37	Nick Fleury	Sr
FB	40	Mike Detwiler	Sr
FB	45	Antoine Singfield	Fr
RB	47	Hadley Kilgore	Sr
OL	59	Chris Johnson	Fr
OL	60	Thomas Stevens	Fr
OL	63	Matt Page	Fr
OL	65	John Vorsheck	Jr
OL	66	Steven Grace	Sr
OL	67	Keoki Fraser	Fr
OL	68	Brandon Phillips	So
OL	69	Dusty Alexander	Sr
OL	72	Kevin Barry	Sr
OL	75	Reggie Sampay	So
OL	77	Makoa Freitas	Jr
OL	78	Darren Safranek	Jr
OL	79	Brandon Hopkins	Fr
WR	81	Robert Spells	Fr
WR	82	Burke Eiteljorg	Jr
WR	83	Michael Hairgrove	Jr
WR	84	Ricky Williams	Fr
TE	85	Tyrone Brown	Fr
TE	86	Jeff Wilk	Jr
TE	87	Steve Fleming	Fr
TE	88	Justin Levasseur	So
TE	89	James Hugo	Jr
TE	90	Aaron Higginbotham	Jr
TE	91	Brad Brittain	Fr
TE	93	Carlos Williams	Fr
WR	94	Rudy Montijo	So

Defense

Pos.	#	Name	Class
CB	2	David Hinton	So
DL	7	Ray Wells	Jr
CB	8	Michael Jolivette	So
DE	9	Johnny Jackson	Sr
CB	11	David Laudermilk	Jr
CB	17	Anthony Banks	Sr
S	19	Brandon Nash	Sr
CB	23	Jermaine Chatman	Sr
S	24	Zaharius Johnson	Sr
LB	27	Lance Briggs	Jr
S	29	Danny Perry	So
DB	30	Tony Wingate	Fr
DB	31	Justin Jochum	Fr
S	33	Clay Hardt	So
DB	37	Johnny Bailey	Jr
LB	38	Shelton Ross	Sr
DB	39	Darrell Brooks	Fr
LB	41	Scott McKee	Jr
LB	42	Joe Siofele	So
DB	43	Kirk Johnson	Fr
LB	44	Patrick Howard	Fr
LB	46	Bret Stray	Fr
S	47	Jarvie Worcester	Jr
DB	48	Landon Kafentzis	Fr
LB	49	Matt Molina	So
LB	50	Ben DalMolin	Fr
DL	51	Austin Ulu	Sr
LB	52	Mike LaCoss	Sr
LB	53	Pedro Limon	Fr
DE	54	Alex Luna	Sr
DT	56	Keoni Fraser	Sr
LB	57	Justin Stewart	So
DT	58	Anthony Thomas	Sr
DL	61	Robert Ramsey	Jr
DE	91	Eli Wnek	Sr
DE	92	Aaron Huisman	Jr
DT	93	Young Thompson	Jr
LB	94	Andy Nuessle	Fr
DL	95	Ben Alualu	Jr
DL	96	Matt Lam	Fr
DE	97	Isaac Watts	Fr
DE	98	Fata Avegalio	Fr
DL	99	Vince Feula	Fr

Special teams

Pos.	#	Name	Class
K	3	Sean Keel	Jr
P	4	Chris Palic	Sr
P	12	Ramey Peru	So
K	28	Bobby Gill	So
K	34	Ryan Slack	Fr

Head coach

- John Mackovic

Coordinators/assistant coaches

- Rick Dykes – Offensive coordinator
- Larry Mac Duff – Defensive coordinator

Legend

- (C) Team captain
- (S) Suspended
- (I) Ineligible
- Injured
- Redshirt

== Game summaries ==
=== at San Diego State ===
Arizona Wildcats (0–0) at San Diego State Aztecs (0–0) – Game summary

Quarter	1	2	3	4	Total
Wildcats	0	16	7	0	23
Aztecs	10	0	0	0	10

at Qualcomm Stadium • San Diego, CA

- Date: August 30, 2001
- Game time: 7:00 P.M.
- Game weather: Clear, mild, 67 °F (19 °C)
- Game attendance: 29,386
- Referee: Ken Flaherty
- TV: ESPN2

Game information

First quarter

- (6:21) SDSU – Tommy Kivroski 23-yard field goal (Drive: 15 plays, 44 yards, 6:31; San Diego State 7–0)
- (3:04) SDSU – Larry Ned 1-yard run, Tommy Kivroski kick (Drive: 1 play, 1 yard, 0:05; San Diego State 10–0)

Second quarter

- (12:32) ARIZ – Team safety (San Diego State 10–2)
- (9:12) ARIZ – Clarence Farmer 12-yard run, two-point pass failed (Drive: 8 plays, 66 yards, 3:20; San Diego State 10–8)
- (2:56) ARIZ – Brandon Nash 57-yard fumble return, Jason Johnson two-point pass to Andrae Thurman (Arizona 16–10)

Third quarter

- (6:37) ARIZ – Brandon Marshall 4-yard pass from Jason Johnson, Sean Keel kick (Drive: 2 plays, 31 yards, 0:11; Arizona 23–10)

Fourth quarter

- No scoring plays

Statistics	ARIZ	SDSU
First downs	17	14
Total yards	231	201
Rushing yards	37–55	29–41
Passing yards	176	160
Passing: Comp–Att–Int	21–32–1	18–38–0
Time of possession	31:36	28:24

Team	Category	Player	Statistics
Arizona	Passing	Jason Johnson	21/32, 176 yards, TD, INT
Arizona	Rushing	Clarence Farmer	21 carries, 90 yards, TD
Arizona	Receiving	Malosi Leonard	6 receptions, 52 yards
San Diego State	Passing	Lon Sheriff	15/30, 138 yards
San Diego State	Rushing	Larry Ned	21 carries, 43 yards, TD
San Diego State	Receiving	J.R. Tolliver	3 receptions, 39 yards

In Mackovic's debut as Arizona coach, the Wildcats opened the season with a matchup against San Diego State. It was Arizona's first visit to San Diego since they won the Holiday Bowl in 1998. Arizona's offense started slow, but would pick up momentum to get points and the defense shut down the Aztecs to give Mackovic his first win and end the Wildcats’ five-game losing streak (that dated back to the previous year that led to Tomey stepping down).

=== vs Idaho ===
Idaho Vandals (0–1) vs Arizona Wildcats (1–0) – Game summary

Quarter	1	2	3	4	Total
Vandals	0	0	0	29	29
Wildcats	3	12	7	14	36

at Arizona Stadium • Tucson, AZ

- Date: September 8, 2001
- Game time: 7:00 P.M.
- Game weather: Clear, 89 °F (32 °C)
- Game attendance: 44,250
- Referee: Jim Sprenger
- TV: Fox Sports Arizona

Game information

First quarter

- (12:21) ARIZ – Sean Keel 44-yard field goal (Drive: 7 plays, 53 yards, 2:39; Arizona 3–0)

Second quarter

- (13:15) ARIZ – Clarence Farmer 7-yard run, kick failed (Drive: 4 plays, 66 yards, 1:34; Arizona 9–0)
- (2:05) ARIZ – Brandon Marshall 99-yard pass from Jason Johnson, kick failed (Drive: 1 play, 99 yards, 0:12; Arizona 15–0)

Third quarter

- (7:50) ARIZ – Andrae Thurman 19-yard pass from Jason Johnson, Sean Keel kick (Drive: 8 plays, 56 yards, 2:57; Arizona 22–0)

Fourth quarter

- (14:57) ARIZ – Clarence Farmer 1-yard run, Sean Keel kick (Drive: 10 plays, 76 yards, 4:02; Arizona 29–0)
- (12:33) IDA – Rossi Martin 8-yard pass from John Welsh, Keith Stamps kick (Drive: 6 plays, 65 yards, 2:24; Arizona 29–7)
- (11:21) ARIZ – Leo Mills 22-yard run, Sean Keel kick (Drive: 4 plays, 65 yards, 1:12; Arizona 36–7)
- (8:07) IDA – Chris Lacy 20-yard pass from John Welsh, Keith Stamps kick (Drive: 11 plays, 80 yards, 3:14; Arizona 36–14)
- (3:21) IDA – Ethan Jones 25-yard pass from John Welsh, John Welsh two-point pass to Kevin O'Connell (Drive: 2 plays, 70 yards, 0:33; Arizona 36–22)
- (0:52) IDA – Rossi Martin 6-yard pass from John Welsh, Keith Stamps kick (Drive: 10 plays, 70 yards, 1:46; Arizona 36–29)

Statistics	IDA	ARIZ
First downs	29	22
Total yards	479	491
Rushing yards	37–113	36–181
Passing yards	366	310
Passing: Comp–Att–Int	30–49–1	21–35–0
Time of possession	33:03	26:57

Team	Category	Player	Statistics
Idaho	Passing	John Welsh	28/46, 349 yards, 4 TD
Idaho	Rushing	Blair Lewis	21 carries, 110 yards
Idaho	Receiving	Chris Lacy	6 receptions, 98 yards, TD
Arizona	Passing	Jason Johnson	20/30, 304 yards, 2 TD
Arizona	Rushing	Clarence Farmer	18 carries, 118 yards, 2 TD
Arizona	Receiving	Brandon Marshall	1 reception, 99 yards

In their home opener, Arizona hosted Idaho. The Wildcats’ offense would dominate, though they would miss a pair of extra points after touchdowns. Mac Duff's defense was “Desert Swarm”-like early, by shutting out the Vandals in the first three quarters. In the fourth, Idaho would mount a furious rally, as Arizona's defense was playing garbage time, but would fall short as the Wildcats held on and Mackovic won his first home game.

=== vs UNLV ===
UNLV Rebels (0–2) vs Arizona Wildcats (2–0) – Game summary

Quarter	1	2	3	4	Total
Rebels	7	0	0	14	21
Wildcats	14	10	7	7	38

at Arizona Stadium • Tucson, AZ

- Date: September 22, 2001
- Game time: 7:00 P.M.
- Game weather: Clear, 91 °F (33 °C)
- Game attendance: 50,623
- Referee: Jim Fogltance
- TV: KWBA

Game information

First quarter

- (10:30) ARIZ – Bobby Wade 14-yard pass from Jason Johnson, Sean Keel kick (Drive: 11 plays, 61 yards, 4:30; Arizona 7–0)
- (8:03) UNLV – Ahmad Briggs 30-yard fumble return, Dillon Pieffer kick (Tied 7–7)
- (0:08) ARIZ – James Hugo 12-yard pass from Jason Johnson, Sean Keel kick (Drive: 9 plays, 76 yards, 2:56; Arizona 14–7)

Second quarter

- (8:40) ARIZ – Sean Keel 20-yard field goal (Drive: 8 plays, 57 yards, 3:57; Arizona 17–7)
- (3:16) ARIZ – Tremaine Cox 80-yard run, Sean Keel kick (Drive: 2 plays, 80 yards, 0:15; Arizona 24–7)

Third quarter

- (0:27) ARIZ – Bobby Wade 15-yard pass from Jason Johnson, Sean Keel kick (Drive: 2 plays, 26 yards, 0:25; Arizona 31–7)

Fourth quarter

- (13:14) UNLV – Joe Haro 7-yard run, Dillon Pieffer kick (Drive: 5 plays, 63 yards, 2:13; Arizona 31–14)
- (11:25) ARIZ – Michael Jolivette 40-yard fumble return, Sean Keel kick (Arizona 38–14)
- (1:05) UNLV – Bobby Nero 15-yard pass from Kurt Nantkes, Dillon Pieffer kick (Drive: 6 plays, 47 yards, 2:31; Arizona 38–21)

Statistics	UNLV	ARIZ
First downs	11	24
Total yards	280	440
Rushing yards	37–124	37–184
Passing yards	156	256
Passing: Comp–Att–Int	7–20–0	19–34–0
Time of possession	28:02	31:58

Team	Category	Player	Statistics
UNLV	Passing	Jason Thomas	5/17, 123 yards
UNLV	Rushing	Joe Haro	15 carries, 71 yards, TD
UNLV	Receiving	Troy Mason	4 receptions, 87 yards
Arizona	Passing	Jason Johnson	18/30, 247 yards, 3 TD
Arizona	Rushing	Tremaine Cox	8 carries, 111 yards, TD
Arizona	Receiving	Malosi Leonard	4 receptions, 75 yards

The Wildcats hosted UNLV in their next game. It was the first meeting between the two schools. The game was originally going to be played on September 15, but was postponed a week later along with all other college football games in the wake of the September 11 tragedy.

On the day of the game, Arizona Stadium had heavy security measures due to the aftermath of the 9/11 attacks, as fans entered the stadium. During the pregame, fans held American flags and the stadium observed a moment of silence for the 9/11 victims and the Arizona marching band played the national anthem before kickoff. At halftime, the band, along with UNLV's, performed “God Bless America” and “America the Beautiful” as a symbol of pride.

In the game itself, the Wildcats would outplay the Rebels and Arizona's passing offense dominated on its way to a win and went to 3–0 under Mackovic before entering Pac-10 play.

=== vs Washington State ===
Washington State Cougars (3–0) vs Arizona Wildcats (3–0) – Game summary

Quarter	1	2	3	4	Total
Cougars	28	7	3	10	48
Wildcats	14	7	0	0	21

at Arizona Stadium • Tucson, AZ

- Date: September 29, 2001
- Game time: 7:00 P.M.
- Game weather: Partly Cloudy, 90 °F (32 °C)
- Game attendance: 42,729
- Referee: Jay Stricherz
- TV: KWBA

Game information

First quarter

- (13:50) WSU – Lamont Thompson 36-yard interception return, Drew Dunning kick (Washington State 7–0)
- (9:19) WSU – Dave Minnich 8-yard run, Drew Dunning kick (Drive: 6 plays, 76 yards, 2:05; Washington State 14–0)
- (8:08) WSU – Dave Minnich 29-yard pass from Jason Gesser, Drew Dunning kick (Drive: 3 plays, 48 yards, 1:11; Washington State 21–0)
- (6:57) WSU – Mike Bush 6-yard pass from Jason Gesser, Drew Dunning kick (Drive: 3 plays, 7 yards, 0:55; Washington State 28–0)
- (4:43) ARIZ – Clarence Farmer 31-yard run, Sean Keel kick (Drive: 6 plays, 80 yards, 2:14; Washington State 28–7)
- (3:43) ARIZ – Austin Uku 2-yard fumble return, Sean Keel kick (Washington State 28–14)

Second quarter

- (9:58) ARIZ – Bobby Wade 23-yard pass from Jason Johnson, Sean Keel kick (Drive: 8 plays, 87 yards, 3:45; Washington State 28–21)
- (1:43) WSU – Dave Minnich 6-yard run, Drew Dunning kick (Drive: 18 plays, 87 yards, 8:15; Washington State 35–21)

Third quarter

- (10:32) WSU – Drew Dunning 24-yard field goal (Drive: 11 plays, 81 yards, 4:28; Washington State 38–21)

Fourth quarter

- (5:49) WSU – Dave Minnich 2-yard run, Drew Dunning kick (Drive: 11 plays, 50 yards, 5:26; Washington State 45–21)
- (1:55) WSU – Drew Dunning 49-yard field goal (Drive: 6 plays, 30 yards, 3:02; Washington State 48–21)

Statistics	WSU	ARIZ
First downs	24	15
Total yards	421	266
Rushing yards	51–179	25–101
Passing yards	283	190
Passing: Comp–Att–Int	17–33–1	14–28–4
Time of possession	37:05	22:55

Team	Category	Player	Statistics
Washington State	Passing	Jason Gesser	17/31, 283 yards, 2 TD, INT
Washington State	Rushing	Dave Minnich	30 carries, 121 yards, 3 TD
Washington State	Receiving	Mike Bush	7 receptions, 110 yards, TD
Arizona	Passing	Jason Johnson	13/25, 184 yards, TD, 3 INT
Arizona	Rushing	Clarence Farmer	16 carries, 84 yards, TD
Arizona	Receiving	Andrae Thurman	5 receptions, 95 yards

=== vs No. 7 Oregon ===
No. 7 Oregon Ducks (4–0) vs Arizona Wildcats (3–1) – Game summary

Quarter	1	2	3	4	Total
No. 7 Ducks	14	21	21	7	63
Wildcats	7	7	0	14	28

at Arizona Stadium • Tucson, AZ

- Date: October 6, 2001
- Game time: 7:15 P.M.
- Game weather: High clouds, 70 °F (21 °C)
- Game attendance: 45,258
- Referee: Gordon Riese
- TV: Fox Sports Arizona

Game information

First quarter

- (6:47) ORE – George Wrighster 2-yard pass from Joey Harrington, Jared Siegel kick (Drive: 5 plays, 75 yards, 1:20; Oregon 7–0)
- (3:38) ORE – Joey Harrington 1-yard run, Jared Siegel kick (Drive: 6 plays, 17 yards, 2:57; Oregon 14–0)
- (1:21) ARIZ – Brandon Marshall 44-yard pass from Jason Johnson, Sean Keel kick (Drive: 6 plays, 86 yards, 2:17; Oregon 14–7)

Second quarter

- (13:43) ARIZ – Anthony Fulcher 8-yard pass from Jason Johnson, Sean Keel kick (Drive: 3 plays, 88 yards, 1:03; Tied 14–14)
- (11:39) ORE – Joey Harrington 2-yard run, Jared Siegel kick (Drive: 5 plays, 45 yards, 2:04; Oregon 21–14)
- (6:09) ORE – Samie Parker 38-yard pass from Joey Harrington, Jared Siegel kick (Drive: 6 plays, 66 yards, 2:36; Oregon 28–14)
- (1:21) ORE – Justin Peelle 17-yard pass from Joey Harrington, Jared Siegel kick (Drive: 7 plays, 77 yards, 2:36; Oregon 35–14)

Third quarter

- (11:19) ORE – Maurice Morris 1-yard run, Jared Siegel kick (Drive: 7 plays, 57 yards, 1:36; Oregon 42–14)
- (8:32) ORE – Onterrio Smith 1-yard run, Jared Siegel kick (Drive: 4 plays, 23 yards, 1:13; Oregon 49–14)
- (0:20) ORE – Joey Harrington 2-yard run, Jared Siegel kick (Drive: 6 plays, 35 yards, 1:26; Oregon 56–14)

Fourth quarter

- (12:57) ORE – Onterrio Smith 5-yard run, Jared Siegel kick (Drive: 3 plays, 62 yards, 1:12; Oregon 63–14)
- (9:37) ARIZ – Malosi Leonard 25-yard pass from John Rattay, Sean Keel kick (Drive: 8 plays, 72 yards, 3:20; Oregon 63–21)
- (4:35) ARIZ – Tremaine Cox 26-yard run, Sean Keel kick (Drive: 6 plays, 80 yards, 1:20; Oregon 63–28)

Statistics	ORE	ARIZ
First downs	28	24
Total yards	607	483
Rushing yards	51–282	36–258
Passing yards	325	225
Passing: Comp–Att–Int	19–29–1	14–31–2
Time of possession	33:22	26:38

Team	Category	Player	Statistics
Oregon	Passing	Joey Harrington	15/24, 279 yards, 3 TD, INT
Oregon	Rushing	Onterrio Smith	15 carries, 131 yards, 2 TD
Oregon	Receiving	Samie Parker	6 receptions, 160 yards, TD
Arizona	Passing	Jason Johnson	7/18, 132 yards, 2 TD, INT
Arizona	Rushing	Clarence Farmer	15 carries, 158 yards
Arizona	Receiving	Bobby Wade	3 receptions, 67 yards

After losing to Washington State to begin conference play, Arizona hosted Oregon (who was ranked seventh). The Wildcats would be no match for the Ducks, as Oregon's offense put up 63 points on the scoreboard. At one point earlier in the game, the score was tied at 14 before the Ducks broke it open, and gave the Wildcats an ugly loss.

=== at Oregon State ===
Arizona Wildcats (3–2) at Oregon State Beavers (1–3) – Game summary

Quarter	1	2	3	4	Total
Wildcats	0	0	3	0	3
Beavers	14	14	7	3	38

at Reser Stadium • Corvallis, OR

- Date: October 13, 2001
- Game time: 7:15 P.M.
- Game weather: Clear, 57 °F (14 °C)
- Game attendance: 36,619
- Referee: Jim Fogltance
- TV: Fox Sports Arizona

Game information

First quarter

- (3:28) OSU – James Newson 2-yard pass from Jonathan Smith, Ryan Cesca kick (Drive: 8 plays, 35 yards, 3:30; Oregon State 7–0)
- (0:56) OSU – Kenny Farley 24-yard blocked punt return, Ryan Cesca kick (Oregon State 14–0)

Second quarter

- (10:59) OSU – Jonathan Smith 1-yard run, Ryan Cesca kick (Drive: 5 plays, 44 yards, 1:55; Oregon State 21–0)
- (2:13) OSU – Cole Clasen 26-yard pass from Derek Anderson, Ryan Cesca kick (Drive: 12 plays, 64 yards, 5:12; Oregon State 28–0)

Third quarter

- (5:26) OSU – Ken Simonton 1-yard run, Ryan Cesca kick (Drive: 8 plays, 65 yards, 3:01; Oregon State 35–0)
- (1:15) ARIZ – Sean Keel 28-yard field goal (Drive: 6 plays, 19 yards, 1:54; Oregon State 35–3)

Fourth quarter

- (12:01) OSU – Ryan Cesca 38-yard field goal (Drive: 11 plays, 60 yards, 4:14; Oregon State 38–3)

Statistics	ARIZ	OSU
First downs	11	24
Total yards	159	415
Rushing yards	30–46	49–195
Passing yards	113	220
Passing: Comp–Att–Int	10–24–2	17–34–2
Time of possession	25:47	34:13

Team	Category	Player	Statistics
Arizona	Passing	Jason Johnson	10/24, 113 yards, 2 INT
Arizona	Rushing	Clarence Farmer	19 carries, 55 yards
Arizona	Receiving	Malosi Leonard	4 receptions, 61 yards
Oregon State	Passing	Jonathan Smith	10/20, 125 yards, TD, INT
Oregon State	Rushing	Ken Simonton	18 carries, 104 yards, TD
Oregon State	Receiving	Cole Clasen	4 receptions, 58 yards, TD

=== at No. 15 Washington ===
Arizona Wildcats (3–3) at No. 15 Washington Huskies (2–3) – Game summary

Quarter	1	2	3	4	Total
Wildcats	14	0	7	7	28
No. 15 Huskies	21	0	0	10	31

at Husky Stadium • Seattle, WA

- Date: October 20, 2001
- Game time: 3:30 P.M.
- Game weather: Cloudy, 50 °F (10 °C)
- Game attendance: 71,108
- TV: Fox Sports Arizona

Game information

First quarter

- (9:18) WASH – Todd Elstrom 21-yard pass from Cody Pickett, John Anderson kick (Drive: 12 plays, 73 yards, 2:14; Washington 7–0)
- (5:30) ARIZ – Bobby Wade 4-yard pass from Jason Johnson, Sean Keel kick (Drive: 8 plays, 75 yards, 3:40; Tied 7–7)
- (5:09) WASH – Paul Arnold 78-yard pass from Cody Pickett, John Anderson kick (Drive: 1 play, 78 yards, 0:14; Washington 14–7)
- (2:51) ARIZ – Andrae Thurman 12-yard pass from Jason Johnson, Sean Keel kick (Drive: 9 plays, 78 yards, 2:04; Tied 14–14)
- (1:39) WASH – Patrick Reddick 75-yard pass from Cody Pickett, John Anderson kick (Drive: 2 plays, 73 yards, 1:02; Washington 21–14)

Second quarter

- No scoring plays

Third quarter

- (12:30) ARIZ – John Rattay 15-yard run, Sean Keel kick (Drive: 1 play, 15 yards, 0:09; Tied 21–21)

Fourth quarter

- (5:18) ARIZ – Clarence Farmer 16-yard run, Sean Keel kick (Drive: 3 plays, 39 yards, 1:12; Arizona 28–21)
- (4:04) WASH – John Anderson 39-yard field goal (Drive: 4 plays, -6 yards, 1:14; Arizona 28–24)
- (0:13) WASH – Cody Pickett 3-yard run, John Anderson kick (Drive: 6 plays, 55 yards, 3:11; Washington 31–28)

Statistics	ARIZ	WASH
First downs	22	26
Total yards	394	538
Rushing yards	44–199	28–83
Passing yards	195	455
Passing: Comp–Att–Int	16–28–1	29–49–4
Time of possession	27:54	32:06

Team	Category	Player	Statistics
Arizona	Passing	John Rattay	9/18, 115 yards, INT
Arizona	Rushing	Clarence Farmer	21 carries, 147 yards, TD
Arizona	Receiving	Malosi Leonard	4 receptions, 77 yards
Washington	Passing	Cody Pickett	29/49, 455 yards, 3 TD, 4 INT
Washington	Rushing	Rich Alexis	11 carries, 45 yards
Washington	Receiving	Paul Arnold	7 receptions, 138 yards, TD

Arizona traveled to Seattle to take on Washington, who was also ranked (15th). The Wildcats would battle the Huskies in a back and forth affair, and took the lead in the fourth quarter. However, Washington was able to drive into Arizona territory and scored in the final minute to give Arizona a painful loss for the second year in a row.

=== vs USC ===
USC Trojans (2–5) vs Arizona Wildcats (3–4) – Game summary

Quarter	1	2	3	4	Total
Trojans	3	28	0	10	41
Wildcats	10	3	14	7	34

at Arizona Stadium • Tucson, AZ

- Date: October 27, 2001
- Game time: 3:30 P.M.
- Game weather: Partly Cloudy, 93 °F (34 °C)
- Game attendance: 46,399
- Referee: Dave Cutaia
- TV: Fox Sports Arizona

Game information

First quarter

- (11:27) ARIZ – Sean Keel 24-yard field goal (Drive: 7 plays, 46 yards, 2:18; Arizona 3–0)
- (4:34) USC – David Davis 32-yard field goal (Drive: 9 plays, 31 yards, 2:19; Tied 3–3)
- (1:35) ARIZ – Michael Jolivette 60-yard interception return, Sean Keel kick (Arizona 10–3)

Second quarter

- (13:35) USC – Kevin Arbet 70-yard interception return, David Davis kick (Tied 10–10)
- (11:00) USC – Alex Holmes 1-yard pass from Carson Palmer, David Davis kick (Drive: 4 plays, 12 yards, 1:41; USC 17–10)
- (5:43) USC – Sunny Byrd 1-yard run, David Davis kick (Drive: 12 plays, 66 yards, 4:01; USC 24–10)
- (0:32) USC – Kori Dickerson 17-yard pass from Carson Palmer, David Davis kick (Drive: 5 plays, 66 yards, 0:45; USC 31–10)
- (0:00) ARIZ – Sean Keel 46-yard field goal (Drive: 5 plays, 41 yards, 0:32; USC 31–13)

Third quarter

- (7:43) ARIZ – Clarence Farmer 22-yard run, Sean Keel kick (Drive: 2 plays, 26 yards, 0:39; USC 31–20)
- (3:47) ARIZ – Brandon Marshall 24-yard pass from Jason Johnson, Sean Keel kick (Drive: 7 plays, 66 yards, 2:00; USC 31–27)

Fourth quarter

- (10:46) USC – David Davis 47-yard field goal (Drive: 10 plays, 51 yards, 3:15; USC 34–27)
- (7:05) ARIZ – Jason Johnson 9-yard run, Sean Keel kick (Drive: 9 plays, 64 yards, 3:41; Tied 34–34)
- (1:50) USC – Kris Richard 58-yard interception return, David Davis kick (USC 41–34)

Statistics	USC	ARIZ
First downs	18	20
Total yards	312	412
Rushing yards	30–64	34–101
Passing yards	248	311
Passing: Comp–Att–Int	24–49–2	23–43–4
Time of possession	29:34	30:26

Team	Category	Player	Statistics
USC	Passing	Carson Palmer	24/49, 248 yards, 2 TD, 2 INT
USC	Rushing	Sunny Byrd	22 carries, 67 yards, TD
USC	Receiving	Kareem Kelly	5 receptions, 64 yards
Arizona	Passing	Jason Johnson	23/43, 311 yards, TD, 4 INT
Arizona	Rushing	Clarence Farmer	17 carries, 78 yards, TD
Arizona	Receiving	Andrae Thurman	4 receptions, 96 yards

The Wildcats returned home after their heartbreaking loss at Washington and faced USC (who, like Arizona, had a first-year head coach). The Trojans would dominate early, and led 31–13 at halftime before the Wildcats stormed back in the second half to tie the game at 34 in the fourth quarter. Late in the quarter, Arizona had an opportunity to take the lead. However, they would throw an interception that USC returned for a touchdown that gave the Trojans the lead back. The Wildcats would have one last chance in the closing seconds, but ended up being stopped and Arizona fell short again for their fifth straight loss, which tied the same streak that ended the previous season. It was also their tenth consecutive Pac-10 loss that also dated back to 2000.

A memorable moment occurred early in the fourth quarter, as the Arizona Stadium PA announced gave an update on the World Series score between the Diamondbacks and Yankees (the first game of the series was played on the same day of the Arizona-USC game). When it was announced that the Diamondbacks led 5–1 after three innings, the stadium crowd let out a loud cheer and the Arizona student section chanted “Let’s go, D’Backs”, as the Diamondbacks representative all of Arizona, including Tucson (the Diamondbacks would ultimately win the game and the series in seven games, much to the delight of the Arizona fans).

=== at California ===
Arizona Wildcats (3–5) at California Golden Bears (0–7) – Game summary

Quarter	1	2	3	4	Total
Wildcats	0	28	10	0	38
Golden Bears	3	0	0	21	24

at California Memorial Stadium • Berkeley, CA

- Date: November 3, 2001
- Game time: 1:30 P.M.
- Game weather: Clear, 68 °F (20 °C)
- Game attendance: 26,222
- Referee: Jim Sprenger
- TV: Fox Sports Arizona

Game information

First quarter

- (7:28) CAL – Mark Jensen 43-yard field goal (Drive: 10 plays, 29 yards, 2:46; California 3–0)

Second quarter

- (14:03) ARIZ – Clarence Farmer 65-yard run, Sean Keel kick (Drive: 4 plays, 82 yards, 0:45; Arizona 7–3)
- (10:35) ARIZ – Justin Levasseur 3-yard pass from Jason Johnson, Sean Keel kick (Drive: 5 plays, 41 yards, 1:40; Arizona 14–3)
- (4:45) ARIZ – Bobby Wade 50-yard pass from Jason Johnson, Sean Keel kick (Drive: 5 plays, 74 yards, 1:47; Arizona 21–3)
- (0:01) ARIZ – Bobby Wade 13-yard pass from Jason Johnson, Sean Keel kick (Drive: 6 plays, 71 yards, 0:57; Arizona 28–3)

Third quarter

- (11:03) ARIZ – Sean Keel 38-yard field goal (Drive: 4 plays, 8 yards, 0:58; Arizona 31–3)
- (0:52) ARIZ – Bobby Wade 16-yard pass from Jason Johnson, Sean Keel kick (Drive: 7 plays, 87 yards, 3:16; Arizona 38–3)

Fourth quarter

- (8:36) CAL – Terrell Williams 2-yard run, Mark Jensen kick (Drive: 8 plays, 65 yards, 3:28; Arizona 38–10)
- (6:47) CAL – LaShaun Ward 38-yard pass from Kyle Boller, Mark Jensen kick (Drive: 4 plays, 64 yards, 1:03; Arizona 38–17)
- (4:52) CAL – LaShaun Ward 44-yard pass from Kyle Boller, Mark Jensen kick (Drive: 3 plays, 44 yards, 0:17; Arizona 38–24)

Statistics	ARIZ	CAL
First downs	23	25
Total yards	474	354
Rushing yards	39–137	46–115
Passing yards	337	239
Passing: Comp–Att–Int	19–34–1	14–39–1
Time of possession	28:43	31:17

Team	Category	Player	Statistics
Arizona	Passing	Jason Johnson	18/29, 315 yards, 4 TD
Arizona	Rushing	Clarence Farmer	27 carries, 165 yards, TD
Arizona	Receiving	Bobby Wade	6 receptions, 118 yards, 3 TD
California	Passing	Kyle Boller	9/25, 178 yards, 2 TD, INT
California	Rushing	Terrell Williams	28 carries, 108 yards, TD
California	Receiving	LaShaun Ward	4 receptions, 135 yards, 2 TD

Attempted to look for Mackovic's first conference win, the Wildcats traveled to Berkeley to face winless California. Arizona started off slow early but would take control later on with a solid offense and blitzing defense. The Golden Bears would make things interesting late and pulled within two scores, but would not come closer as the Wildcats finally ended their Pac-10 slump and Mackovic earned his first conference victory. The win also kept Arizona's chances alive for a bowl.

=== vs No. 16 Stanford ===
No. 16 Stanford Cardinal (5–2) vs Arizona Wildcats (4–5) – Game summary

Quarter	1	2	3	4	Total
No. 16 Cardinal	10	17	21	3	51
Wildcats	10	3	3	21	37

at Arizona Stadium • Tucson, AZ

- Date: November 10, 2001
- Game time: 5:00 P.M.
- Game weather: High clouds, 84 °F (29 °C)
- Game attendance: 40,632
- Referee: Chuck McFerrin
- TV: ABC

Game information

First quarter

- (11:54) STAN – Mike Biselli 29-yard field goal (Drive: 7 plays, 35 yards, 3:06; Stanford 3–0)
- (8:28) ARIZ – Clarence Farmer 43-yard pass from Jason Johnson, Sean Keel kick (Drive: 1 play, 43 yards, 0:08; Arizona 7–3)
- (4:07) ARIZ – Sean Keel 22-yard field goal (Drive: 7 plays, 45 yards, 2:29; Arizona 10–3)
- (2:02) STAN – Teyo Johnson 23-yard pass from Chris Lewis, Mike Biselli kick (Drive: 6 plays, 72 yards, 2:05; Tied 10–10)

Second quarter

- (14:05) STAN – Luke Powell 26-yard pass from Chris Lewis, Mike Biselli kick (Drive: 6 plays, 53 yards, 1:58; Stanford 17–10)
- (7:06) STAN – Teyo Johnson 3-yard pass from Chris Lewis, Mike Biselli kick (Drive: 10 plays, 69 yards, 5:23; Stanford 24–10)
- (0:48) STAN – Mike Biselli 44-yard field goal (Drive: 9 plays, 37 yards, 4:00; Stanford 27–10)
- (0:00) ARIZ – Sean Keel 52-yard field goal (Drive: 6 plays, 31 yards, 0:48; Stanford 27–13)

Third quarter

- (14:46) STAN – Tank Williams 25-yard fumble return, Mike Biselli kick (Stanford 34–13)
- (13:05) ARIZ – Sean Keel 43-yard field goal (Drive: 8 plays, 54 yards, 1:41; Stanford 34–16)
- (7:32) STAN – Coy Wire 89-yard fumble return, Mike Biselli kick (Stanford 41–16)
- (3:54) STAN – Kenneth Tolon 71-yard run, Mike Biselli kick (Drive: 1 play, 71 yards, 0:17; Stanford 48–16)

Fourth quarter

- (10:44) STAN – Mike Biselli 21-yard field goal (Drive: 7 plays, 24 yards, 3:14; Stanford 51–16)
- (9:33) ARIZ – Clarence Farmer 20-yard run, Sean Keel kick (Drive: 4 plays, 80 yards, 1:11; Stanford 51–23)
- (6:44) ARIZ – Clarence Farmer 66-yard run, Sean Keel kick (Drive: 2 plays, 66 yards, 0:20; Stanford 51–30)
- (4:17) ARIZ – Malosi Leonard 21-yard pass from John Rattay, Sean Keel kick (Drive: 1 play, 21 yards, 0:05; Stanford 51–37)

Statistics	STAN	ARIZ
First downs	21	24
Total yards	445	578
Rushing yards	55–276	24–163
Passing yards	169	415
Passing: Comp–Att–Int	13–23–0	25–50–1
Time of possession	38:21	21:39

Team	Category	Player	Statistics
Stanford	Passing	Chris Lewis	13/23, 169 yards, 3 TD
Stanford	Rushing	Brian Allen	23 carries, 143 yards
Stanford	Receiving	Teyo Johnson	8 receptions, 116 yards, 2 TD
Arizona	Passing	Jason Johnson	14/28, 260 yards, TD, INT
Arizona	Rushing	Clarence Farmer	12 carries, 141 yards, 2 TD
Arizona	Receiving	Bobby Wade	7 receptions, 131 yards

=== at Arizona State ===
Arizona Wildcats (4–6) at Arizona State Sun Devils (4–5) – Game summary

Quarter	1	2	3	4	Total
Wildcats	20	0	14	0	34
Sun Devils	0	7	7	7	21

at Sun Devil Stadium • Tempe, AZ

- Date: November 23, 2001
- Game time: 1:00 P.M.
- Game weather: Cloudy, 70 °F (21 °C)
- Game attendance: 55,831
- Referee: Jay Stricherz
- TV: Fox Sports Arizona

Game information

First quarter

- (8:31) ARIZ – Bobby Wade 19-yard pass from Jason Johnson, Sean Keel kick (Drive: 13 plays, 70 yards, 6:29; Arizona 7–0)
- (3:41) ARIZ – Jason Johnson 6-yard run, Sean Keel kick (Drive: 7 plays, 47 yards, 2:51; Arizona 14–0)
- (0:38) ARIZ – Clarence Farmer 20-yard run, kick failed (Drive: 4 plays, 43 yards, 1:33; Arizona 20–0)

Second quarter

- (12:24) ASU – Donnie O'Neal 19-yard pass from Andrew Walter, Mike Barth kick (Drive: 11 plays, 74 yards, 3:14; Arizona 20–7)

Third quarter

- (13:27) ASU – Delvon Flowers 33-yard run, Mike Barth kick (Drive: 5 plays, 69 yards, 1:33; Arizona 20–14)
- (3:15) ARIZ – Malosi Leonard 10-yard pass from Jason Johnson, Sean Keel kick (Drive: 8 plays, 80 yards, 3:07; Arizona 27–14)
- (2:20) ARIZ – Brandon Nash 13-yard interception return, Sean Keel kick (Arizona 34–14)

Fourth quarter

- (7:39) ASU – Delvon Flowers 3-yard run, Mike Barth kick (Drive: 10 plays, 51 yards, 2:08; Arizona 34–21)

Statistics	ARIZ	ASU
First downs	25	20
Total yards	388	330
Rushing yards	44–163	33–113
Passing yards	225	217
Passing: Comp–Att–Int	18–29–1	16–37–2
Time of possession	32:57	27:03

Team	Category	Player	Statistics
Arizona	Passing	Jason Johnson	18/29, 225 yards, 2 TD, INT
Arizona	Rushing	Clarence Farmer	32 carries, 158 yards, TD
Arizona	Receiving	Bobby Wade	11 receptions, 157 yards, TD
Arizona State	Passing	Andrew Walter	10/22, 132 yards, TD
Arizona State	Rushing	Delvon Flowers	20 carries, 138 yards, 2 TD
Arizona State	Receiving	Donnie O'Neal	7 receptions, 68 yards, TD

After their loss to Stanford that ended their bowl hopes, the Wildcats went to Tempe for the annual rivalry matchup with Arizona State and treated it as their own bowl game. As the Sun Devils had a new coach, the “Duel in the Desert” had a meeting between first-year coaches for both teams.

This was the first year in modern history that the Territorial Cup, the rivalry trophy, would be awarded to the winner. The cup, which was originally awarded in 1899 in the first game between the teams and claimed to be college football's oldest rivalry trophy, went lost for decades before being discovered in 1980. Both Arizona and ASU agreed to have the cup be used for the football rivalry and that the winning team would possess it until the next season.

In the game, the Wildcats scored first and led 20–0 at one point before ASU climbed back in it to cut the lead to 20–14. However, Arizona answered to increase their lead and seemed to break it open with a defensive touchdown. By the fourth quarter, Arizona State tried to come back, but the Wildcats’ defense would come up big to seal the game and Arizona earned their first win in the rivalry since 1998 and also captured the Territorial Cup.

After the game, a fight ensued when Arizona celebrated at midfield and ASU players ran out to start a melee with them, which added more fuel to the rivalry.

With the win, Arizona finished the season with a 5–6 record, matching the previous season's record (also 5–6).

== Season notes ==
- This season would be the only successful one under Mackovic, as Arizona would decline in wins for the rest of his tenure.
- Most of the offseason was overshadowed by Arizona's basketball team's success due to their Final Four run and national title game appearance in the spring, though the football team continued preparing for the season.
- Following Arizona's transition with a new coach, the Wildcats unveiled new branding for its sports teams, including a new “Arizona” wordmark (which is still in use today), as they went in a new direction at the turn of the century and millennium. The end zones at Arizona Stadium were colored in blue with the wordmark in white. Also, the words “Bear Down” were now on the sidelines near the goal lines (with “Bear” in red and “Down” in white, all in the same letter font used in the university's logo), and two little “A”s on the 25-yard lines.
- Wide receiver Bobby Wade would become the de facto leader of the Arizona offense, as he would lead the team in receptions and receiving touchdowns.
- The win over San Diego State is the Wildcats’ last to date over them, and the two did not meet again until 2021, with the Aztecs winning in Tucson. Also, Arizona did not play both Idaho and UNLV again until 2008 and 2013, respectively.
- Following the 9/11 attacks, Arizona wore helmet stickers and patches on their uniforms for the rest of the season, commemorating the victims.
- The Wildcats did not play a Big Ten team for the first time since 1994, ending a streak of six straight seasons.
- Arizona struggled in Pac-10 play, and not winning until early November. The five-game losing streak was a result of poor play, tougher and talented opponents, and offensive mistakes.
- The Wildcats did not play UCLA this season.
- Arizona failed to score a touchdown against Oregon State for the second consecutive season, only mustering a field goal.
- For the game against USC, Arizona had a large “A” logo at midfield, which remains in use to this day.
- Had Arizona defeated either Washington, USC, or Stanford (they came close winning the first two), they would have been bowl-eligible.
- The Wildcats claimed the Territorial Cup for the first time this season. Since then, they would win it six more times (2004, 2008, 2009, 2011, 2014, and 2016) as ASU is currently dominating the rivalry. In addition, this would be the only win over ASU under Mackovic.
- Arizona State would be the only other Pac-10 school besides California that Arizona would beat in the Mackovic era (the Wildcats would defeat the Golden Bears in 2002). Also, this would be the only season under Mackovic that the Wildcats won two or more conference games.

== Awards and honors ==
- Lance Briggs, LB, First-team All-Pac-10
- Clarence Farmer, RB, First-team All-Pac-10

== After the season ==
The Wildcats attempted to improve on their 2001 record in 2002 for a chance at a bowl. However, they would continue to struggle against Pac-10 opponents and Mackovic would be become the center of controversy involving him and his treatment of his players, and fans called for his firing. The Wildcats would end with another losing season, which showed a sign that the Mackovic era would be over in the future.
