= Larry Duff =

Larry Duff is the name of:

- Larry Mac Duff (born 1948), American football coach
- Father Larry Duff, fictional sitcom character
