= 2001 Oregon Ducks football team =

American college football season

2001 Oregon Ducks football

Pac-10 champion Fiesta Bowl champion

Fiesta Bowl, W 38–16 vs. Colorado
- Conference: Pacific-10 Conference

Ranking
- Coaches: No. 2
- AP: No. 2
- Record: 11–1 (7–1 Pac-10)
- Head coach: Mike Bellotti (7th season)
- Offensive coordinator: Jeff Tedford (4th season)
- Offensive scheme: Pro-style
- Defensive coordinator: Nick Aliotti (5th season)
- Base defense: 4–3
- Captain: Game captains
- Home stadium: Autzen Stadium

2001 Pacific-10 Conference football standings
	Conf.			Overall
Team	W		L	W		L
No. 2 Oregon $	7	–	1	11	–	1
No. 10 Washington State	6	–	2	10	–	2
No. 16 Stanford	6	–	2	9	–	3
No. 19 Washington	6	–	2	8	–	4
USC	5	–	3	6	–	6
UCLA	4	–	4	7	–	4
Oregon State	3	–	5	5	–	6
Arizona	2	–	6	5	–	6
Arizona State	1	–	7	4	–	7
California	0	–	8	1	–	10
$ – Conference champion; Rankings from AP Poll

The 2001 Oregon Ducks football team represented the University of Oregon as a member of the Pacific-10 Conference (Pac-10) during the 2001 NCAA Division I-A football season. Led by seventh-year head coach Mike Bellotti, the Ducks compiled an overall record of 11–1 with a mark of 7–1 in conference play, winning the Pac-10 title. Oregon was invited to the Fiesta Bowl, where the Ducks beat Colorado. The team played home games at Autzen Stadium in Eugene, Oregon. The stadium was undergoing its fourth and current renovation and expansion from 41,698 in capacity to 54,000, with standing room for 60,000.

== Before the season ==
=== Returning starters ===
QB Joey Harrington, who went 195–375 (comp-att) on 2,694 yards and 20 touchdowns the season before, RB Maurice Morris, who had 1,188 yards on 286 carries, earning 4.3 for average yards/carry, WR Keenan Howry who had 47 receptions for 721 yards, hauling around 15.3 yards/catch, TE Justin Peelle, who, last season, had 20 receptions for 340 yards and 17 yards per catch.

== Schedule ==
Date	Time	Opponent	Rank	Site	TV	Result	Attendance	Source
September 1	5:00 pm	No. 22 Wisconsin*	No. 7	Autzen Stadium; Eugene, OR	ABC	W 31–28	45,919	
September 8	12:30 pm	Utah*	No. 7	Autzen Stadium; Eugene, OR		W 24–10	45,712	
September 22	7:15 pm	USC	No. 7	Autzen Stadium; Eugene, OR (rivalry)	FSN	W 24–22	45,765	
September 29	6:00 pm	at Utah State*	No. 6	Romney Stadium; Logan, UT	OSN	W 38–21	28,243	
October 6	7:15 pm	at Arizona	No. 6	Arizona Stadium; Tucson, AZ	FSN	W 63–28	45,258	
October 13	12:30 pm	at California	No. 5	California Memorial Stadium; Berkeley, CA		W 48–7	34,552	
October 20	12:30 pm	Stanford	No. 5	Autzen Stadium; Eugene, OR (rivalry)	ABC	L 42–49	46,021	
October 27	4:00 pm	at No. 10 Washington State	No. 13	Martin Stadium; Pullman, WA	ABC	W 24–17	34,150	
November 3	4:00 pm	Arizona State	No. 8	Autzen Stadium; Eugene, OR	FSN	W 42–24	46,064	
November 10	12:30 pm	at No. 17 UCLA	No. 7	Rose Bowl; Pasadena, CA	ABC	W 21–20	78,330	
December 1	12:30 pm	Oregon State	No. 4	Autzen Stadium; Eugene, OR (Civil War)	ABC	W 17–14	46,075	
January 1	5:00 pm	vs. No. 3 Colorado*	No. 2	Sun Devil Stadium; Tempe, AZ (Fiesta Bowl)	ABC	W 38–16	74,118	
*Non-conference game; Rankings from AP Poll released prior to the game; All times are in Pacific time; Source:

- Due to Pac-10 scheduling, rival Washington was not played for the only time since 1944.

== Rankings ==
	Pre	Wk 2	Wk 3	Wk 4	Wk 5	Wk 6	Wk 7	Wk 8	Wk 9	Wk 10	Wk 11	Wk 12	Wk 13	Wk 14	Wk 15	Wk 16	Final
AP Media Poll	7	7	7	7	6	7	5	5	11	8	7	6	6	5	4	2	2
USA Today/ESPN Coaches' Poll	8	7	8	7	6	8	6	5	13	9	7	7	7	5	3	2	2
BCS Poll	Not released								13	10	6	4	5	5	5	4	

== Personnel ==
=== Roster ===
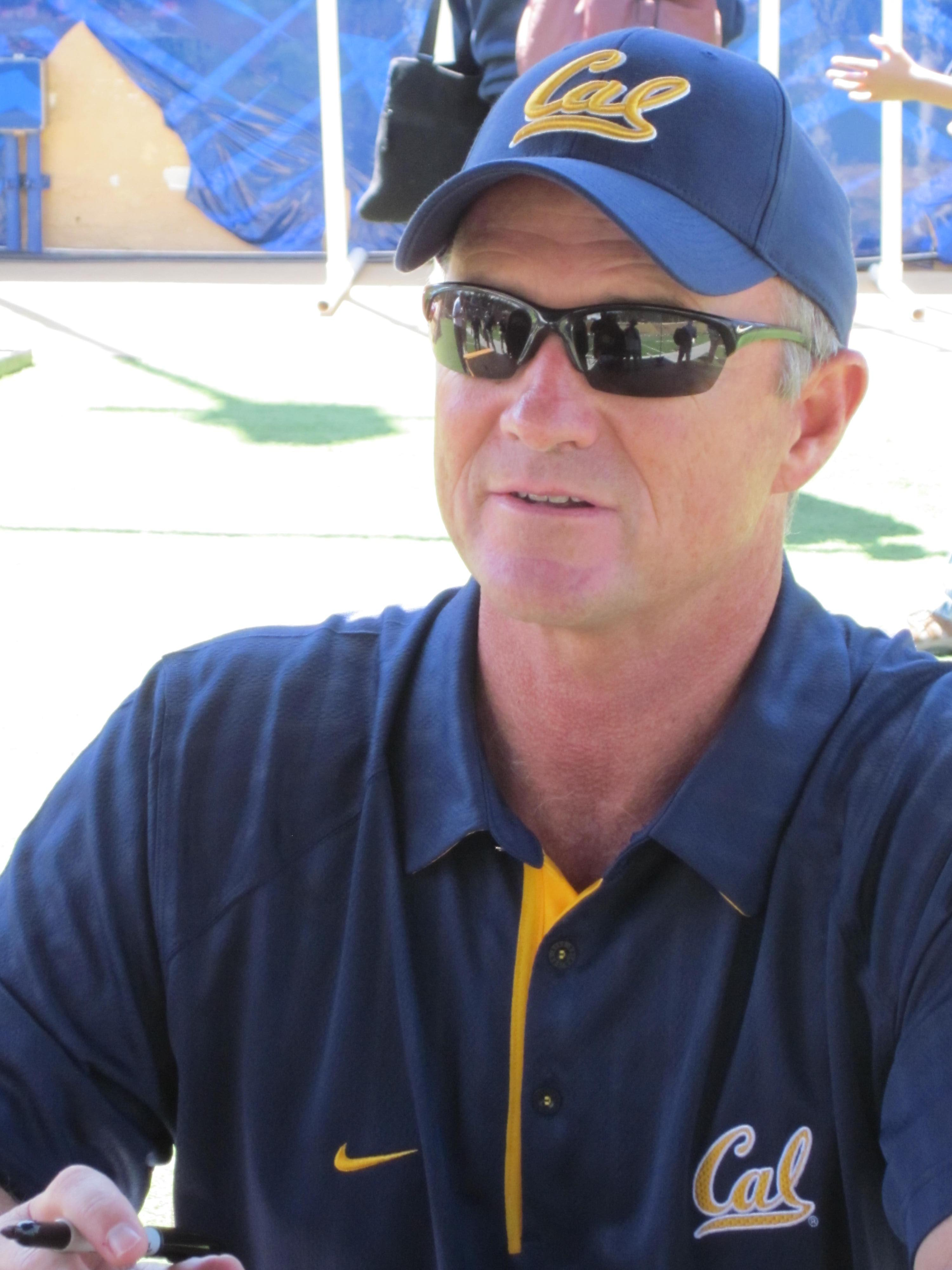
Jeff Tedford (pictured as head coach of Cal in 2010), in his fourth season as offensive coordinator for the Ducks. Following the 2001 season Tedford was hired to be head coach of the California Golden Bears football team.

2001 Oregon Ducks football team roster
Players
Coaches
Offense

Pos.	#	Name	Class
WR	1	Samie Parker	So
RB	2	Onterrio Smith
QB	3	Joey Harrington	Sr
WR	8	Jason Willis
RB	9	Maurice Morris
QB	10	Scott Vossmeyer
QB	11	Kellen Clemens
QB	12	Jason Fife
QB	13	Chris Lombardo
WR	14	Paris Warren
WR	15	Keenan Howry
RB	20	Kenny Washington
RB	27	Ryan Shaw
FB	32	Matt Floberg
RB	34	Allan Amundson
WR	35	Joey McCollum
FB	36	Paul McCrary
TE	41	Josh Rogers
WR	45	Kevin Donoho
FB	46	Joe Strobbe
FB	47	Josh Line
FB	49	Bret Stray
OL	56	Beau Robey
OL	57	Josh Jones
OL	58	Mike Belisle
OL	59	Ian Reynoso
OL	60	Joey Forster
OL	61	Scott Parker
OL	63	Dan Weaver
OL	64	Jason Mohamed
OL	66	Pat Fields
OL	67	Ryan Schmid
OL	68	Jesse Wallace
OL	69	Josh Atkins
OL	70	Josh Hagemeyer
OL	70	Jared Hoff
OL	71	Jim Adams
OL	72	Adam Snyder
OL	73	Phil Finzer
OL	74	Nick Steitz
OL	75	Corey Chambers
OL	77	Michael DeLaGrange
OL	78	Nick Frederico
OL	79	Robin Knebel
WR	80	Demetrius Williams
TE	81	George Wrighster
WR	82	Mike Willis
WR	83	Cy Aleman
TE	84	Justin Peelle
TE	85	Tim Day
WR	86	Keith Allen
TE	87	Willie Walden
WR	88	Gary Daniels
TE	89	Marcus Shelby
WR	91	Terance Joseph
WR	91	Dan Klein
TE	93	Aaron Trimm
TE	94	Nate LiaBraaten

Defense

Pos.	#	Name	Class
CB	4	Steven Moore
CB	5	A.K. Keyes
FS	7	Stephen Clayton
CB	11	Charles Favroth
CB	13	Eddie Smith
S	16	Keith Lewis
CB	17	Rashad Bauman
LB	18	Wesly Mallard
CB	19	Jason Jenkins
LB	20	Ty Tomlin
LB	21	David Martin
FS	22	Rasuli Webster
FS	23	Gary McGraw
DB	25	John Esa
CB	26	Demetrius Spates
DB	27	Madison Caeser
FS	28	Marley Tucker
CB	29	Courtney Miller
DL	30	Quinn Dorsey
FS	32	Neil Collins
DB	34	Jon Lucchesi
LB	35	Erik Cheney
LB	36	Ramone Reed
LB	37	Justin Andrews
LB	39	Kevin Mitchell
DE	40	Darrell Wright
LB	42	Garret Graham
DE	43	Seth McEwan
LB	44	David Moretti
FS	45	Tim Frieh
LB	50	Matt Haliski
DT	51	Hank Tong
LB	52	Jerry Matson
DT	53	Igor Olshansky
DT	54	Zack Freiter
DE	55	Ed Wangler
DT	56	Mac Russell
DE	59	Craig Dukes
DT	60	Randall Bowen
DT	65	Eric Johnson
DE	70	Curtis Gibson
DT	70	David Toomey
DT	89	Adam Isfield
DE	90	Kevin Mack
LB	91	Dan Johnson
DE	92	Devan Long
DT	92	Nuvaj Bassi
DE	94	Roderkus Wright
DT	95	Kai Smalley
DT	96	Chris Tetterton
DT	97	Junior Siavii
DT	99	Robby Valenzuela

Special teams

Pos.	#	Name	Class
P	33	Jason Guerrero
P	38	Jose Arroyo
P	46	Eric Evans
LS	48	Ryan Loftin
PK	49	Josh Cummings

Head coach

- Mike Bellotti

Coordinators/assistant coaches

Offense

- Jeff Tedford – Offensive Coordinator & Quarterbacks
- Neal zoumboukos – Assistant Head Coach & Offensive Line
- Gary campbell – Runningbacks
- Dan ferrigno – Wide receivers
- Robin ross – Tight Ends & Special teams
- Stefan devries – Graduate Assistant

Defense

- Nick Aliotti – Defensive Coordinator & Outside Linebackers
- Steve Greatwood – Defensive line
- Don Pellum – Inside Linebackers & Recruiting Coordinator
- Mike gillhamer – Secondary
- Jim radcliffe – Strength and conditioning
- Nathan naggi – Graduate Assistant

Legend

- (C) Team captain
- (S) Suspended
- (I) Ineligible
- Injured
- Redshirt

Roster

=== Depth chart ===
Defense

FS
Rasuli Webster
Keith Lewis

WLB	MLB	SLB
⋅	David Moretti	⋅
John Harris	Garret Graham	⋅

Rover
Gary McGraw
Stephen Slayton

CB
Rashad Bauman
Jason Jenkins

DE	DT	DT	DE
Seth McEwen	Zach Freiter	Igor Olshansky	Ed Wangler
Kevin Mack	Chris Tetterton	Kai Smalley	Quinn Dorsey

CB
Steve Smith
A.K. Keyes

Offense

WR
Jason Willis
Samie Parker

LT	LG	C	RG	RT
Mike Belisle	Jim Adams	Ryan Schmid	Joey Forster	Phil Finzer
Corey Chambers	Josh Jones	Dan Weaver	Robin Knebel	Adam Snyder

TE
Justin Peelle
George Wrighster

WR
Keenan Howry
Cy Aleman

QB
Joey Harrington
Jason Fife

RB
Maurice Morris
Onterrio Smith

FB
Josh Line
Josh Rogers

Special teams
PK Jared Siegel
PK Navid Niakan
P Jose Arroyo
P Gary Daniels
KR Onterrio Smith
PR Allan Amundson
LS Ryan Loftin
H Jason Fife

== Game summaries ==
=== Wisconsin ===
Prior to Wisconsin coming to Autzen, they were 1–0 to start the season at number 22 (AP). Oregon was number 7 (AP) when they started the season. It was all Oregon in the first quarter, with 10 points scored, making it 10–0 at the start of the 2nd quarter. Wisconsin answered with 7 points of their own in the second quarter to give Oregon a 10–7 halftime lead. Entering the third quarter, both the Ducks and the Badgers would score 14 points to make it a 24–21 ball game before the fourth. Oregon came out victorious in the final stanza of the game, 31–28.

#22 Wisconsin at #7 Oregon

Team	1	2	3	4	Total
Badgers	0	7	14	7	28
• Ducks	10	0	14	7	31

- Date: September 1
- Location: Autzen Stadium, Eugene, Oregon
- Game start: 5:00 p.m. PST
- Game attendance: 45,919
- Television network: ABC

Scoring summary
Q1	ORE	Siegel 20 yard field goal	ORE 3–0
Q1	ORE	Peelle 23 yard pass from Harrington (Siegel kick)	ORE 10–0
Q2	WIS	Davis 10 yard pass from Sorgi (Allen kick)	ORE 10–7
Q3	WIS	Charles 13 yard pass from Sorgi (Allen kick)	WIS 14–10
Q3	ORE	Peelle 11 yard pass from Harrington (Siegel kick)	ORE 17–14
Q3	WIS	Davis 69 yard run (Allen kick)	WIS 21–17
Q3	ORE	Morris 1 yard run (Siegel kick)	ORE 24–21
Q4	WIS	Sorgi 1 yard run (Allen kick)	WIS 28–24
Q4	ORE	Harrington 2 yard run (Siegel kick)	ORE 31–28

=== Utah ===
Utah was 1–0 to start their season following a win against Utah State. Oregon, ranked No. 7, was rolling high off a victory against No. 22 Wisconsin at home. Oregon scored first to make it a 7–0 game with 13 minutes in the 1st quarter left to play. Utah cut Oregon's lead to 4 by the time the first was over, making it 7–3. The 2nd quarter saw plenty more action, with Oregon taking a 7-point lead back, 10–3. Utah struck back quickly and tied the game at 10–10 with 11 minutes and 15 seconds left in the half. Maurice Morris ran in a score to make it 16–10, but kicker Jared Seigel missed the PAT, leaving the score 16–10 at the half. When the second half commenced, there were no scores between both teams in the 3rd quarter, and in the 4th quarter, Oregon would score, and then complete a 2-point play to make it a 24–10 victory.

Utah at #7 Oregon

Team	1	2	3	4	Total
Utes	3	7	0	0	10
• Ducks	7	9	0	8	24

- Date: September 8
- Location: Autzen Stadium, Eugene, Oregon
- Game start: 12:00 p.m. PST
- Game attendance: 45,712

=== USC ===
Oregon started conference play with USC on September 22, 2001. The visiting Trojans were 1–1 following a narrow loss to No. 12 Kansas State, 10–6. Oregon completed a trick play pass from RB Onterrio Smith to TE Justin Peelle for a 35-yard touchdown to give Oregon a 7–0 lead with 4:42 left in the 1st quarter. USC struck back, making it a 7–3 game to end the 1st quarter. The 2nd quarter saw USC cut Oregon's lead to one point, making it a 7–6 game before USC QB Carson Palmer was intercepted by linebacker Steve Smith for a 37-yard interception return, making it a 14–6 Oregon lead going into the half. Oregon scored again with 13:50 to go in the 3rd quarter, making it a 21–6 ball game. Between that last score and up to 16 seconds left in the 4th quarter, USC scored 14 straight points to give USC a 22–21 lead. Kicker Jason Seigel nailed a 32-yard field goal to stab the dagger into USC for a 24–22 final score and to move to 3–0 on the year.

USC at #7 Oregon

Team	1	2	3	4	Total
Trojans	3	3	7	9	22
• Ducks	7	7	7	3	24

- Date: September 22
- Location: Autzen Stadium, Eugene, Oregon
- Game start: 7:15 p.m. PST
- Game attendance: 45,765

=== Utah State ===
Ranked No. 6, Oregon would play Utah State for the first time since 1990, and would be the first time they played at Romney Stadium. It was not until the 2nd quarter that Utah State scored first to give the Aggies a 7–0 lead, before Oregon scored 17 straight points to give Oregon a 17–7 lead entering the half. When the 3rd quarter started, Utah State scored to cut Oregon's lead to 3, 17–14. Oregon then scored again to make it a 24–14 lead with 11:45 to go in the 3rd. Utah State scored again to end the 3rd quarter to cut Oregon's lead once again to 3, 24–21. The 4th quarter saw all Oregon scores, with the Ducks winning the game 38–21 and moving 4–0 on the season.

#6 Oregon at Utah State

Team	1	2	3	4	Total
• Ducks	0	17	7	14	38
Aggies	0	7	14	0	21

- Date: September 29
- Location: Romney Stadium, Logan, Utah
- Game start: 6:00 p.m. PST
- Game attendance: 28,243
- Television network: OSN

=== Arizona ===
Arizona played host to No. 6 Oregon for week 5 of college football action. Arizona was 3–1 (0–1 in the Pac-10 conference) coming off of a brutal 30–7 loss to Pac-10 foe Washington State. Oregon remained at No. 6 for the second week straight, at 4–0 (1–0 Pac-10). Oregon scored on two straight possessions to make it a 14–0 game with 4:11 to go in the 1st quarter. Arizona scored to cut Oregon's lead to 7 points, 14–7, at the end of the quarter. The second quarter saw Arizona tie the game up at 14–14, but this would be the closest Arizona came to overtaking Oregon for the lead. Oregon scored on the next 7 possessions to make it a 63–14 lead with 13:06 left in the 4th quarter. Arizona scored twice to make it 63–28, but that's all Arizona could muster against Oregon. Oregon moved to 5–0 (2–0 Pac-10) on the year, and Arizona dropped to 3–2 (0–2 Pac-10).

#6 Oregon at Arizona

Team	1	2	3	4	Total
• Ducks	14	21	21	7	63
Wildcats	7	7	0	14	28

- Date: October 6
- Location: Arizona Stadium, Tucson, Arizona
- Game start: 7:15 p.m. PST
- Game attendance: 45,258
- Television network: FSN

=== California ===
California played host to number 5 Oregon in week 6. California was 0–4 (0–2 Pac-10), having dropped the last four games in embarrassing fashion, and facing Oregon looked like a daunting challenge. Oregon was 5–0 (2–0 Pac-10) entering the game. Oregon scored on six straight possessions to make it a 42–0 game at the start of the 4th quarter. Cal scored one time to make it 42–7, but Oregon scored again to make it 48–7 at the end, dropping California to 0–5 (0–3 Pac-10). Oregon moved on to 6–0 (3–0 Pac-10).

#5 Oregon at California

Team	1	2	3	4	Total
• Ducks	21	7	14	6	48
Golden Bears	0	0	0	7	7

- Date: October 13
- Location: California Memorial Stadium, Berkeley, California
- Game start: 12:30 p.m. PST
- Game attendance: 34,552

=== Stanford ===
Oregon was ranked No. 5 to begin week 7 of play against Stanford. Stanford was 3–1 (2–1 Pac-10) entering week 7, and Oregon was 6–0 (3–0 Pac-10). Stanford struck first to make it 7–0 with 14:55 left in the 1st. Oregon would strike back to make it 7–7 with 11:23 to go. Stanford would score again to make it a 14–7 game with 8:24 left in the 1st. Oregon would then score on 2 possessions to make it a 21–14 game going into the 2nd quarter. Stanford scored to open the second quarter, tying the game 21–21. Oregon would score again to give Oregon a 28–21 lead going into the half. When the 3rd quarter started, Oregon scored again to take a 14-point lead, 35–21. Stanford scored again, narrowing Oregon's lead to 7 points, 35–28. Oregon scored again, making it a 42–28 game, ending the 3rd quarter. Stanford held Oregon to no points in the 4th, and Stanford upset No. 5 Oregon, 49–42, marking their first loss of the season, 6–1 (3–1 Pac-10).

Stanford at #5 Oregon

Team	1	2	3	4	Total
• Cardinal	14	7	7	21	49
Ducks	21	7	14	0	42

- Date: October 20
- Location: Autzen Stadium, Eugene, Oregon
- Game start: 12:30 p.m. PST
- Game attendance: 46,021
- Television network: ABC

Scoring summary
Q1	STAN	Moore 1 yard run (Biselli kick)	STAN 7–0
Q1	ORE	Howry 4 yard pass from Harrington (Siegel kick)	Tie 7–7
Q1	STAN	Carter 6 yard run (Biselli kick)	STAN 14–7
Q1	ORE	Peelle 15 yard pass from Harrington (Siegel kick)	Tie 14–14
Q1	ORE	Howry 39 yard pass from Harrington (Siegel kick)	ORE 21–14
Q2	STAN	Carter 6 yard run (Biselli kick)	Tie 21–21
Q2	ORE	Morris 6 yard run (Siegel kick)	ORE 28–21
Q3	ORE	Howry 69 yard punt return (Siegel kick)	ORE 35–21
Q3	STAN	Johnson 28 yard pass from Lewis (Biselli kick)	ORE 35–28
Q3	ORE	Smith 96 yard kickoff return (Siegel kick)	ORE 42–28
Q4	STAN	Powell 24 yard pass from Lewis (Biselli kick)	ORE 42–35
Q4	STAN	Carter 1 yard run (kick failed)	ORE 42–41
Q4	STAN	Carter 3 yard run (Johnson pass from Lewis)	STAN 49–42

=== Washington State ===
Oregon would drop 8 spots to No. 13 in week 8 against Washington State. Washington State was No. 10 in week 8, with a 7–0 (4–0 Pac-10) record. Oregon entered Pullman with a 6–1 (3–1 Pac-10) record. Both teams would go scoreless in the 1st quarter. Washington State would score first on a 34-yard field goal to give them a 3–0 lead. Oregon would score a touchdown to make it a 7–3 game at halftime. Oregon scored to start the 3rd, making it a 14–3 game. Oregon and WSU would score on consecutive possessions, with Oregon coming back on top at the end of the game, 24–17, to continue their winning ways. Oregon would do to WSU what Stanford did to them, handing them their first loss of the season. Oregon would advance to 7–1 (4–1 Pac-10), while Washington State would fall to an identical record.

#13 Oregon at No. 10 Washington State

Team	1	2	3	4	Total
• Ducks	0	7	7	10	24
Cougars	0	3	0	14	17

- Date: October 27
- Location: Martin Stadium, Pullman, Washington
- Game start: 4:00 p.m. PST
- Game attendance: 34,150
- Television network: ABC

=== Arizona State ===
Oregon would advance to No. 8 after the win against Washington State, with Arizona State coming to Eugene. Oregon was 7–1 (4–1 Pac-10) entering week 9, and ASU was 4–3 (1–3 Pac-10). Oregon would win this game to a tune of 42–24, improving to 8–1 (5–1 Pac-10), while ASU fell to 4–4 (1–4 Pac-10).

Arizona State at No. 8 Oregon

Team	1	2	3	4	Total
Sun Devils	7	3	0	14	24
• Ducks	14	7	14	7	42

- Date: November 3
- Location: Autzen Stadium, Eugene, Oregon
- Game start: 4:00 p.m. PST
- Game attendance: 46,064

=== UCLA ===
Oregon (8–1, 5–1 Pac-10) improved to No. 7 moving into week 10, and played guest to the No. 17 UCLA Bruins (6–2, 3–2 Pac-10). Oregon would score first on a 5-yard Joey Harrington touchdown run to make it 7–0. UCLA would score again to make it 7–7 to end the 1st quarter. Oregon started the 2nd quarter with a 1-yard Maurice Morris touchdown run, making it 14–7. UCLA would nail a 20-yard field goal to make it 14–10 to end the half. UCLA would nail another field goal, this time from 37 yards, to make it a 14–13 game. The 4th quarter saw UCLA take the lead from Oregon to make it a 20–14 UCLA lead. Oregon would score with 10:44 left, making it 21–20, and this would be the final score of the game. Oregon would move to 9–1 (6–1 Pac-10), while UCLA would drop to 6–3 (3–3 Pac-10).

#7 Oregon at #17 UCLA

Team	1	2	3	4	Total
• Ducks	7	7	0	7	21
Bruins	7	3	3	7	20

- Date: November 10
- Location: Rose Bowl, Pasadena, California
- Game start: 12:30 p.m. PST
- Game attendance: 78,330
- Television network: ABC

=== Oregon State ===
Oregon State Beavers (5–6) at #4 Oregon Ducks (9–1)

Quarter	1	2	3	4	Total
Oregon St	3	3	0	8	14
Oregon	3	0	0	14	17

at Autzen Stadium • Eugene, Oregon

- Date: December 1
- Game time: 12:30 p.m. PDT
- Game attendance: 46,075
- TV: ABC
- ESPN

The 105th meeting of the Civil War pitted Oregon, who was already bowl eligible at this time, and Oregon State needed a win to become bowl eligible with the Ducks still in the BCS conversation. Oregon State scored first, nailing a long 43-yard field goal to give OSU a 3–0 lead. Oregon followed up with a 44-yard field goal of their own to tie it 3–3 to end the 1st. Oregon State would score on a 28-yard field goal to make it a 6–3 game at the half. Going scoreless in the 3rd, Oregon State went 3-and-out to start the 4th quarter, and punter Carl Tobey punted it to Keenan Howry, where he returned it 68 yards for the 10–6 lead. Oregon would score again to make it 17–6. Oregon State returned the favor by scoring and landing a 2-point play, but it was not enough to defeat the No. 4 Ducks, 17–14 the final from Eugene.

Scoring summary

Quarter	Time	Drive			Team	Scoring information	Score	
Quarter	Time	Plays	Yards	TOP	Team	Scoring information	OSU	ORE
1		8	39		Oregon St	43-yard field goal by Kirk Ylniemi	3	0
1		5	35		Oregon	44-yard field goal by Jared Siegel	3	3
2		12	80		Oregon St	28-yard field goal by Kirk Ylniemi	6	3
4					Oregon	Punt returned 68 yards for touchdown by Keenan Howry, Jared Siegel kick good	6	10
4		12	80		Oregon	Maurice Morris 9-yard touchdown run, Jared Siegel kick good	6	17
4		11	69		Oregon St	Josh Hawkins 24-yard touchdown reception from Jonathan Smith, 2-point pass good	14	17
"TOP" = time of possession. For other American football terms, see Glossary of American football.							14	17

=== Fiesta Bowl ===
Prior to Oregon (10–1, 7–1 Pac-10) being placed in the 2002 Fiesta Bowl against No. 3 Colorado, many people believed that Oregon, now at No. 2, was going to face off against No. 1 Miami, however, the BCS had named Nebraska as the contender, despite Nebraska not playing in the Big 12 championship game. However, these events transpired since Nebraska's first loss that year to Colorado: No. 2 Florida lost to Tennessee, the Colorado Buffaloes went on to win the Big 12 Championship Game over No. 3 Texas, and in the SEC Championship Game, No. 2 Tennessee was stunned by LSU. This left Miami as the undefeated and undisputed No. 1 team in the country but a host of other teams vying for No. 2. Oregon played against the 2-loss Colorado Buffaloes on January 1, 2002. Colorado scored first, with a 1-yard touchdown to take the lead, 7–0. Oregon would score after them, tying the game 7–7. Oregon would score on their next 5 possessions, including a 49-yard touchdown run by Maurice Morris, in which Morris sat down on a defender after a failed attempt at a tackle and continued to run, and an 80-yard Joey Harrington pass to WR Samie Parker. Colorado would score twice in the 4th quarter, nailing a field goal and a touchdown with a failed PAT, but Oregon would prevail 38–16, earning their first Fiesta Bowl win under HC Mike Bellotti. This game also marked Bellotti's first 11-win season.

Fiesta Bowl
#2 Oregon vs. #3 Colorado

Team	1	2	3	4	Total
• Ducks	7	14	7	10	38
Buffaloes	7	0	0	9	16

- Date: January 1
- Location: Sun Devil Stadium, Tempe, Arizona
- Game start: 5:00 p.m. PST
- Game attendance: 74,118
- Television network: ABC

Scoring summary
Q1	COL	Drumm 1 yard run (Brougham kick)	COL 7–0
Q1	ORE	Howry 28 yard pass from Harrington (Siegel kick)	Tie 7–7
Q2	ORE	Parker 79 yard pass from Harrington (Siegel kick)	ORE 14–7
Q2	ORE	Smith 6 yard pass from Harrington (Siegel kick)	ORE 21–7
Q3	ORE	Morris 49 yard run (Siegel kick)	ORE 28–7
Q4	ORE	Peelle 4 yard pass from Harrington (Siegel kick)	ORE 35–7
Q4	COL	Flores 39 yard field goal	ORE 35–10
Q4	COL	Graham 4 yard pass from Ochs (kick failed)	ORE 35–16

== Statistics ==
=== Team ===
Team Statistics
	Oregon	Opponents
Points	412	256
Points Per Game	34.3	21.3
Rushing Yards	2,312	1,383
Rushing attempts	446	413
Average Per Rush	5.2	3.3
Average Per Game	192.7	115.3
Rushing TDs	24	17
Passing Yards	2,920	3,416
Comp–Att	222–377	241–478
Comp %	58.9	50.4
Average Per Game	243.3	284.7
Passing TDs	28	15
Interceptions	6	21
Total offense	5,232	4,799
Total play	823	891
Average Per Play	6.4	5.4
Average Per Game	436	399.9

Score by Quarter
	1st	2nd	3rd	4th	TOTAL
Oregon	111	103	105	93	412
Opponents	51	68	49	111	279

=== Offense ===
Passing Statistics
#	NAME	POS	RAT	CMP	ATT	YDS	CMP%	TD	INT
3	Joey Harrington	QB	141.2	186	322	2,415	57.8	23	5
12	Jason Fife	QB	132.9	6	9	71	66.7	0	0
14	Paris Warren	WR	520.0	1	1	50	100.0	0	0
2	Onterrio Smith	RB	362.0	1	2	35	50.0	1	0
TOTALS			143.5	194	334	2,571	58.1	24	5

Rushing Statistics
#	NAME	POS	CAR	YDS	LONG	TD
2	Onterrio Smith	RB	161	1,058		7
9	Maurice Morris	RB	169	1,049		9
3	Joey Harrington	QB	55	56		7
15	Keenan Howry	WR	4	51		1
32	Matt Floberg	FB	10	35		0
82	Jason Willis	WR	4	28		0
34	Allan Amundson	RB	3	10		0
36	Ramone Reed	LB	2	5		0
12	Jason Fife	WB	3	3		0
47	Josh Line	FB	1	3		0
TOTALS			412	2,298		24

Receiving Statistics
#	NAME	POS	REC	YDS	LONG	TD
15	Keenan Howry	WR	49	649		8
1	Samie Parker	WR	32	586		3
84	Justin Peelle	TE	29	425		8
82	Jason Willis	WR	37	386		0
86	Keith Allen	WR	7	161		0
81	George Wrighster	TE	11	123		1
9	Maurice Morris	RB	12	100		1
2	Onterrio Smith	RB	8	63		1
47	Josh Line	FB	6	60		2
83	Cy Aleman	WR	2	17		0
3	Joey Harrington	QB	1	11		0
TOTALS			194	2,591		24

== After the season ==
=== Team records broken ===
Tackles for loss – single season

	YR	NAME	POS	TFL
New	2001	Kevin Mitchell	LB	23.0
Old	1980	Andy Vorbora	LB	22.0

Passes broken up – single season

	YR	NAME	POS	PBU
New	2001	Steve Smith	DB	28
Old	2000	Steve Smith	DB	22

=== Awards ===
Conference

- Joey Harrington – Pac-10 Offensive Player of the Year

Team

- Joey Harrington, QB – Skeie's Award (Team MVP)
- Ryan Schmid, OL – Gonyea Award (Most Inspirational Player)
- Onterrio Smith, RB – Casanova Award (First year player that exemplifies competitiveness, inspiration and performance)
- Chris Tetterton, DL – Clarke Trophy (Most Improved Player)
- Jim Adams, OL – Ed Moshofsky Award (Best Lineman)
- Zack Freiter, DL – Joe Schaffeld Award (Best Defensive Lineman)
- Wesly Mallard, LB – Gordon E. Wilson Award (Best Special Teams Player)
- Seth McEwan, DL – Bob Officer Award (Major contribution to team despite physical adversity)
- Ryan Schmid, OL – Senior Academic/Attitude Award
- Maurice Morris, RB – Duane Cargill Award (Significant Impact)

=== Academic All-Americans ===
The following members of the 2001 team excelled in the classroom as well as the gridiron and were honored as NCAA Academic All-Americans.

- Joey Harrington, QB
- Ryan Schmid, OL Second Selection

=== All-Pac-10 Team ===
The following members of the 2001 team were honored as All-Pac-10 players.

First team

- Joey Harrington, QB
- Keenan Howry, WR & PR
- Justin Peelle, TE Unanimous Selection

Second team

- Maurice Morris, RB
- Onterrio Smith, RB & KOR
- Wesly Mallard, LB & ST
- Rashad Bauman, DB

Honorable mention

- Jim Adams, OL
- Joey Forster, OL
- Ryan Schmid, OL
- Zack Freiter, DL
- Seth McEwan, LB
- Kevin Mitchell, LB
- Steve Smith, CB
- Keith Lewis, FS

=== Academic All-Pac-10 ===
The following members of the 2001 team excelled in the classroom as well as the gridiron and were honored as Academic All-Pac-10 team members.

- Ryan Schmid, OL Second Selection
- Dan Weaver, OL

=== Senior postseason games ===
The following Oregon seniors participated in post-season senior games to audition for NFL scouts.

East–West Shrine Game

- Joey Harrington, QB
- Maurice Morris, RB

Senior Bowl

- Rashad Bauman, CB
- Steve Smith, CB

Hula Bowl

- Justin Peelle, TE

=== Players drafted ===
The following members of the 2001 team were selected in the NFL Draft.

No.	Player	Class	Pos.	Year	Round	Pick	Team
3	Joey Harrington	SR	QB	2002	1	3	Detroit Lions
9	Maurice Morris	SR	RB	2002	2	54	Seattle Seahawks
17	Rashad Bauman	SR	CB	2002	3	79	Washington Redskins
84	Justin Peelle	SR	TE	2002	4	103	San Diego Chargers
18	Wesly Mallard	SR	TE	2002	6	188	New York Giants
6	Steve Smith	SR	DB	2002	7	246	San Diego Chargers
81	George Wrighster	SR	TE	2003	4	104	Jacksonville Jaguars
2	Onterrio Smith	SR	RB	2003	4	105	Minnesota Vikings
15	Keenan Howry	SR	WR	2003	7	221	Minnesota Vikings
53	Igor Olshansky	JR	DE	2004	2	35	San Diego Chargers
94	Junior Siavii	SR	DT	2004	2	36	Kansas City Chiefs
1	Samie Parker	SR	WR	2004	4	105	Kansas City Chiefs
72	Adam Snyder	SR	OL	2005	3	94	San Francisco 49ers
81	Marcus Maxwell	SR	WR	2005	7	223	San Francisco 49ers
11	Kellen Clemens	Rs.SR	QB	2006	2	49	New York Jets
6	Demetrius Williams	Rs.SR	WR	2006	4	111	Baltimore Ravens

== Team honors ==
On September 11, 2014, the University of Oregon announced that the 2001 Oregon Ducks football team would be inducted in the University of Oregon Athletics Hall of Fame. The 2001 team set school records for wins in a season and featured Heisman Trophy finalist Joey Harrington, who led the Ducks to a 38–16 win in the Fiesta Bowl over Big 12 champions (and future Pac-12 member) Colorado. The team finished with a school record second-place ranking in the AP Poll and USA Today Coaches Poll. Three players made the all-Pac-10 first team, two were named All-Americans and 14 were eventually selected in the NFL Draft.
