= 2001 California Golden Bears football team =

American college football season

2001 California Golden Bears football
- Conference: Pacific-10
- Record: 1–10 (0–8 Pac-10)
- Head coach: Tom Holmoe (5th season)
- Offensive coordinator: Al Borges (1st season)
- Defensive coordinator: Lyle Setencich (5th season)
- Home stadium: California Memorial Stadium

2001 Pacific-10 Conference football standings
	Conf.			Overall
Team	W		L	W		L
No. 2 Oregon $	7	–	1	11	–	1
No. 10 Washington State	6	–	2	10	–	2
No. 16 Stanford	6	–	2	9	–	3
No. 19 Washington	6	–	2	8	–	4
USC	5	–	3	6	–	6
UCLA	4	–	4	7	–	4
Oregon State	3	–	5	5	–	6
Arizona	2	–	6	5	–	6
Arizona State	1	–	7	4	–	7
California	0	–	8	1	–	10
$ – Conference champion; Rankings from AP Poll

The 2001 California Golden Bears football team was an American football team that represented the University of California, Berkeley in the Pacific-10 Conference (Pac-10) during the 2001 NCAA Division I-A football season. In their fifth and final year under head coach Tom Holmoe, the Golden Bears compiled a 1–10 record (0–8 against Pac-10 opponents), finished in last place in the Pac-10, and were outscored by their opponents by a combined score of 431 to 201.

The team's statistical leaders included Kyle Boller with 1,741 passing yards, Terrell Williams with 688 rushing yards, and Charon Arnold with 606 receiving yards.

Following a loss to Arizona and an 0–8 start, Holmoe announced his resignation effective at the end of the season.

== Schedule ==
Date	Time	Opponent	Site	TV	Result	Attendance
September 1	12:30 p.m.	Illinois*	California Memorial Stadium; Berkeley, CA	FSN	L 17–44	38,160
September 8	2:30 p.m.	BYU*	California Memorial Stadium; Berkeley, CA		L 16–44	33,043
September 22	2:00 p.m.	at Washington State	Martin Stadium; Pullman, WA		L 20–51	21,534
September 29	2:00 p.m.	No. 13 Washington	California Memorial Stadium; Berkeley, CA		L 28–31	35,172
October 13	12:30 p.m.	No. 5 Oregon	California Memorial Stadium; Berkeley, CA		L 7–48	34,552
October 20	7:15 p.m.	at No. 4 UCLA	Rose Bowl; Pasadena, CA (rivalry)	FSN	L 17–56	65,366
October 27	1:00 p.m.	at Oregon State	Reser Stadium; Corvallis, OR		L 10–19	36,142
November 3	12:30 p.m.	Arizona	California Memorial Stadium; Berkeley, CA		L 24–38	26,222
November 10	12:30 p.m.	USC	California Memorial Stadium; Berkeley, CA		L 14–55	33,506
November 17	12:30 p.m.	at No. 13 Stanford	Stanford Stadium; Stanford, CA (Big Game)	KGO	L 28–35	71,150
November 23	10:00 a.m.	at Rutgers*	Rutgers Stadium; Piscataway, NJ		W 20–10	18,111
*Non-conference game; Rankings from AP Poll released prior to the game; All times are in Pacific time

== Roster ==
2001 California Golden Bears football team roster
Players
Coaches
Offense

Pos.	#	Name	Class
QB	7	Kyle Boller	Jr
OL	63	Mark Wilson	So
G	64	Scott Tercero	Jr

Defense

Pos.	#	Name	Class
CB	1	Jemeel Powell	Jr
S	2	Nnamdi Asomugha	Jr
LB	48	Tully Banta-Cain	Jr
LB	49	Scott Fujita	Sr

Special teams

Pos.	#	Name	Class

Head coach

- Tom Holmoe

Coordinators/assistant coaches

Legend

- (C) Team captain
- (S) Suspended
- (I) Ineligible
- Injured
- Redshirt

Roster
