= 2001 Stanford Cardinal football team =

American college football season

2001 Stanford Cardinal football

Seattle Bowl, L 14–24 vs. Georgia Tech
- Conference: Pacific-10 Conference

Ranking
- Coaches: No. 17
- AP: No. 16
- Record: 9–3 (6–2 Pac-10)
- Head coach: Tyrone Willingham (7th season)
- Offensive coordinator: Bill Diedrick (4th season)
- Offensive scheme: West Coast
- Defensive coordinator: Kent Baer (3rd season)
- Base defense: 4–3
- Home stadium: Stanford Stadium

2001 Pacific-10 Conference football standings
	Conf.			Overall
Team	W		L	W		L
No. 2 Oregon $	7	–	1	11	–	1
No. 10 Washington State	6	–	2	10	–	2
No. 16 Stanford	6	–	2	9	–	3
No. 19 Washington	6	–	2	8	–	4
USC	5	–	3	6	–	6
UCLA	4	–	4	7	–	4
Oregon State	3	–	5	5	–	6
Arizona	2	–	6	5	–	6
Arizona State	1	–	7	4	–	7
California	0	–	8	1	–	10
$ – Conference champion; Rankings from AP Poll

The 2001 Stanford Cardinal football team represented Stanford University as a member of the Pacific-10 Conference (Pac-10) during 2001 NCAA Division I-A football season. Led by Tyrone Willingham in his seventh and final season as head coach, the Cardinal compiled an overall record of 9–3 with a mark of 6–2 in conference play, placing in a three-way tie for second in the Pac-10. Stanford was invited to the Seattle Bowl, where the Cardinal lost to Georgia Tech. The team played home games at Stanford Stadium in Stanford, California.

Willingham resigned at after the season to become the head football coach at the University of Notre Dame.

== Schedule ==
Date	Time	Opponent	Rank	Site	TV	Result	Attendance
September 8	7:00 p.m.	Boston College*		Stanford Stadium; Stanford, CA	FSN	W 38–22	41,250
September 22	7:00 p.m.	Arizona State		Stanford Stadium; Stanford, CA		W 51–28	39,580
September 29	3:30 p.m.	at USC		Los Angeles Memorial Coliseum; Los Angeles, CA (rivalry)	FSN	W 21–16	53,962
October 13	2:00 p.m.	Washington State	No. 23	Stanford Stadium; Stanford, CA		L 39–45	40,950
October 20	12:30 p.m.	at No. 5 Oregon		Autzen Stadium; Eugene, OR (rivalry)	ABC	W 49–42	46,021
October 27	12:30 p.m.	No. 4 UCLA	No. 20	Stanford Stadium; Stanford, CA (rivalry)	ABC	W 38–28	64,495
November 3	12:30 p.m.	at No. 11 Washington	No. 10	Husky Stadium; Seattle, WA	FSN	L 28–42	72,090
November 10	4:00 p.m.	at Arizona	No. 16	Arizona Stadium; Arizona, AZ	ABC	W 51–37	40,632
November 17	12:30 p.m.	California	No. 13	Stanford Stadium; Stanford, CA (Big Game)	KGO	W 35–28	71,150
November 24	5:00 p.m.	Notre Dame*	No. 13	Stanford Stadium; Stanford, CA (rivalry)	ABC	W 17–13	51,780
December 1	2:00 p.m.	at San Jose State*	No. 12	Spartan Stadium; San Jose, CA (rivalry)		W 41–14	17,745
December 27	1:00 p.m.	vs. Georgia Tech*	No. 11	Safeco Field; Seattle, WA (Seattle Bowl)	ESPN	L 14–24	30,144
*Non-conference game; Rankings from AP Poll released prior to the game; All times are in Pacific time

== Rankings ==
Ranking movements Legend: ██ Increase in ranking ██ Decrease in ranking — = Not ranked
	Week																
Poll	Pre	1	2	3	4	5	6	7	8	9	10	11	12	13	14	15	Final
AP	—	—	—	—	—	22	23	—	20	10	16	13	13	12	12	11	16
Coaches	—	—	—	—	—	24	22	—	22	13	19	15	13	12	12	11	17
BCS	Not released								14	6	11	9	9	10	9	9	Not released

== Game summaries ==
=== Boston College ===
	1	2	3	4	Total
Eagles					0
Cardinal					0

=== Arizona State ===
	1	2	3	4	Total
Sun Devils					0
Cardinal					0

=== At USC ===
	1	2	3	4	Total
Cardinal					0
Trojans					0

=== Washington State ===
	1	2	3	4	Total
Cougars					0
No. 23 Cardinal					0

=== At Oregon ===
Stanford at No. 5 Oregon

Team	1	2	3	4	Total
• Cardinal	14	7	7	21	49
No. 5 Ducks	21	7	14	0	42

- Date: October 20
- Location: Autzen Stadium, Eugene, Oregon
- Game start: 12:30 p.m. PST
- Game attendance: 46,021
- Television network: ABC

Scoring summary
1	STAN	Moore 1 yard run (Biselli kick)	STAN 7–0
1	ORE	Howry 4 yard pass from Harrington (Siegel kick)	Tie 7–7
1	STAN	Carter 6 yard run (Biselli kick)	STAN 14–7
1	ORE	Peelle 15 yard pass from Harrington (Siegel kick)	Tie 14–14
1	ORE	Howry 39 yard pass from Harrington (Siegel kick)	ORE 21–14
2	STAN	Carter 6 yard run (Biselli kick)	Tie 21–21
2	ORE	Morris 6 yard run (Siegel kick)	ORE 28–21
3	ORE	Howry 69 yard punt return (Siegel kick)	ORE 35–21
3	STAN	Johnson 28 yard pass from Lewis (Biselli kick)	ORE 35–28
3	ORE	Smith 96 yard kickoff return (Siegel kick)	ORE 42–28
4	STAN	Powell 24 yard pass from Lewis (Biselli kick)	ORE 42–35
4	STAN	Carter 1 yard run (kick failed)	ORE 42–41
4	STAN	Carter 3 yard run (Johnson pass from Lewis)	STAN 49–42

=== UCLA ===
	1	2	3	4	Total
No. 4 Bruins					0
No. 20 Cardinal					0

=== At No. 11 Washington ===
	1	2	3	4	Total
No. 10 Cardinal					0
No. 11 Huskies					0

=== At Arizona ===
	1	2	3	4	Total
No. 16 Cardinal					0
Wildcats					0

=== California ===
	1	2	3	4	Total
Golden Bears					0
No. 13 Cardinal					0

=== Notre Dame ===
	1	2	3	4	Total
Fighting Irish					0
No. 13 Cardinal					0

=== At San Jose State ===
	1	2	3	4	Total
No. 12 Cardinal					0
Spartans					0

=== Vs. Georgia Tech (Seattle Bowl) ===
	1	2	3	4	Total
Yellow Jackets					0
No. 11 Cardinal					0

== Coaching staff ==
- Tyrone Willingham: head coach
- Bill Diedrick: offensive coordinator and quarterbacks
- Buzz Preston: running backs
- Trent Miles: wide receivers
- John McDonell: offensive line (centers and guards)
- Mike Denbrock: tight ends and offensive line (tackles)
- Kent Baer: defensive coordinator and linebackers
- Phil Zacharias: defensive ends and special teams coordinator
- Denny Schuler: defensive backs
- Dave Tipton: recruiting coordinator

== Awards and honors ==
=== All-Americans ===
- Eric Heitmann, guard (AFCA-Coaches, FN)
- Tank Williams, safety (AFCA-Coaches)
- Luke Powell, all-purpose player / return specialist (FWAA)
