= 2001 Washington Huskies football team =

American college football season

2001 Washington Huskies football

Holiday Bowl, L 43–47 vs. Texas
- Conference: Pacific-10 Conference

Ranking
- Coaches: No. 19
- AP: No. 19
- Record: 8–4 (6–2 Pac-10)
- Head coach: Rick Neuheisel (3rd season)
- Offensive coordinator: Keith Gilbertson (3rd season)
- Offensive scheme: Spread
- Defensive coordinator: Tim Hundley (3rd season)
- Base defense: Multiple
- MVPs: Willie Hurst (offense); Ben Mahdavi (defense)
- Captains: Kyle Benn; Willie Hurst; Larry Tripplett
- Home stadium: Husky Stadium

2001 Pacific-10 Conference football standings
	Conf.			Overall
Team	W		L	W		L
No. 2 Oregon $	7	–	1	11	–	1
No. 10 Washington State	6	–	2	10	–	2
No. 16 Stanford	6	–	2	9	–	3
No. 19 Washington	6	–	2	8	–	4
USC	5	–	3	6	–	6
UCLA	4	–	4	7	–	4
Oregon State	3	–	5	5	–	6
Arizona	2	–	6	5	–	6
Arizona State	1	–	7	4	–	7
California	0	–	8	1	–	10
$ – Conference champion; Rankings from AP Poll

The 2001 Washington Huskies football team was an American football team that represented the University of Washington during the 2001 NCAA Division I-A football season. In its third season under head coach Rick Neuheisel, the team compiled an 8-4 record, finished in a three-way tie for second place in the Pacific-10 Conference, and was outscored by opponents 370 to 353. Running back Willie Hurst and linebacker Ben Mahdavi were selected as the team's most valuable players on offense and defense, respectively.

The season opened with tragedy when 16 UW alumni and fans were killed in a plane crash in the Yucatan Peninsula on September 12. The Chichen Itza sightseers were participants on a week-long Husky-themed Caribbean cruise with Don James, Sonny Sixkiller and other Husky coaches and players prior to the Washington-Miami game scheduled for Sept. 15 in the Orange Bowl. This game was cancelled following the September 11 attacks and rescheduled to November 24.

== Schedule ==
Date	Time	Opponent	Rank	Site	TV	Result	Attendance
September 8	12:30 p.m.	No. 11 Michigan*	No. 15	Husky Stadium; Seattle, WA	ABC	W 23–18	74,080
September 22	12:30 p.m.	Idaho*	No. 13	Husky Stadium; Seattle, WA	FSN	W 53–3	70,145
September 29	2:00 p.m.	at California	No. 13	California Memorial Stadium; Berkeley, CA	FSN	W 31–28	35,172
October 6	12:30 p.m.	USC	No. 11	Husky Stadium; Seattle, WA	FSN	W 27–24	72,946
October 13	12:30 p.m.	at No. 7 UCLA	No. 10	Rose Bowl; Pasadena, CA	ABC	L 13–35	70,377
October 20	3:30 p.m.	Arizona	No. 15	Husky Stadium; Seattle, WA	FSN	W 31–28	71,108
October 27	6:15 p.m.	at Arizona State	No. 13	Sun Devil Stadium; Tempe, AZ	FSN	W 33–31	50,106
November 3	12:30 p.m.	No. 10 Stanford	No. 11	Husky Stadium; Seattle, WA	FSN	W 42–28	72,090
November 10	12:30 p.m.	at Oregon State	No. 8	Reser Stadium; Corvallis, OR	FSN	L 24–49	36,682
November 17	12:30 p.m.	No. 9 Washington State	No. 16	Husky Stadium; Seattle, WA (Apple Cup)	ABC	W 26–14	74,442
November 24	5:00 p.m.	at No. 1 Miami*	No. 12	Orange Bowl; Miami, FL	ABC	L 7–65	78,114
December 28	7:30 p.m.	vs. No. 9 Texas*	No. 21	Qualcomm Stadium; San Diego, CA (Holiday Bowl)	ESPN	L 43–47	60,548
*Non-conference game; Rankings from AP Poll released prior to the game; All times are in Pacific time

- Due to Pac-10 scheduling, rival Oregon was not played for the only time since 1944.
- Following the September 11 attacks, the Miami game was moved from September 15 to November 24.

== Roster ==
2001 Washington Huskies football team roster
Players
Coaches
Offense

Pos.	#	Name	Class
RB	24	Rich Alexis	So
WR	20	Paul Arnold	Jr
OT	72	Todd Bachert	So
QB	12	Taylor Barton	Jr
C	64	Kyle Benn (C)	Sr
OT	65	Khalif Barnes	Fr
RB	29	Braxton Cleman (injured)	Sr
TE	97	Joe Collier	Sr
WR	18	Todd Elstrom	Sr
RB	8	Willie Hurst (C)	Sr
WR	7	Wilbur Hooks	Jr
G	67	Nick Newton	So
QB	3	Cody Pickett	So
WR	5	Patrick Reddick	Sr
TE	14	Jerramy Stevens	Jr
FB	45	Ken Walker	Sr
TE	84	Kevin Ware	Jr
WR	1	Reggie Williams	Fr
FB	48	Matthias Wilson	Jr
G	75	Elliott Zajac	Jr

Defense

Pos.	#	Name	Class
CB	3	Roc Alexander	So
LB	31	Sam Blanche	Sr
FS	43	Owen Biddle	Jr
SS	34	Greg Carothers	So
LB	88	Marquis Cooper	So
FS	19	Wondame Davis	Sr
LB	90	Kai Ellis	Jr
SS	9	Roderick Green	Sr
DT	99	Tank Johnson	So
LB	47	Anthony Kelley	Sr
CB	12	Omare Lowe	Sr
LB	41	Ben Mahdavi	Jr
CB	28	Chris Massey	So
DT	65	Josh Miller	Fr
DE	98	Marcus Roberson	Sr
DT	70	Larry Tripplett (C)	Sr
LB	5	Zach Tuiasosopo	Fr
LB	6	Jamaun Willis	Sr

Special teams

Pos.	#	Name	Class
K	15	John Anderson	Jr
P	17	Derek McLaughlin	Fr

Head coach

- Rick Neuheisel (3rd year)

Coordinators/assistant coaches

- Keith Gilbertson (OC, TE)
- Tim Hundley (DC, OLB)
- Tony Alford (RB)
- Steve Axman (AHC, QB, WR)
- Randy Hart (DL)
- Bobby Hauck (S, ST)
- Chuck Heater (CB)
- Brent Myers (OL)
- Tom Williams (LB)

Legend

- (C) Team captain
- (S) Suspended
- (I) Ineligible
- Injured
- Redshirt

== NFL draft ==
Three Huskies were selected in the 2002 NFL draft, which lasted seven rounds (261 selections).

Player	Position	Round	Overall	Franchise
Jerramy Stevens	TE	1st	28	Seattle Seahawks
Larry Tripplett	DT	2nd	42	Indianapolis Colts
Omare Lowe	CB	5th	161	Miami Dolphins
