= 2001 Oregon State Beavers football team =

American college football season

2001 Oregon State Beavers football
- Conference: Pacific-10 Conference
- Record: 5–6 (3–5 Pac-10)
- Head coach: Dennis Erickson (3rd season)
- Offensive coordinator: Tim Lappano (3rd season)
- Offensive scheme: Single-back spread
- Defensive coordinator: Craig Bray (2nd season)
- Base defense: 4–3
- Home stadium: Reser Stadium

2001 Pacific-10 Conference football standings
	Conf.			Overall
Team	W		L	W		L
No. 2 Oregon $	7	–	1	11	–	1
No. 10 Washington State	6	–	2	10	–	2
No. 16 Stanford	6	–	2	9	–	3
No. 19 Washington	6	–	2	8	–	4
USC	5	–	3	6	–	6
UCLA	4	–	4	7	–	4
Oregon State	3	–	5	5	–	6
Arizona	2	–	6	5	–	6
Arizona State	1	–	7	4	–	7
California	0	–	8	1	–	10
$ – Conference champion; Rankings from AP Poll

The 2001 Oregon State Beavers football team represented Oregon State University as a member of the Pacific-10 Conference (Pac-10) during the 2001 NCAA Division I-A football season. Led by third-year head coach Dennis Erickson, the Beavers compiled an overall record of 5–6 with a mark of 3–5 in conference play, placing seventh in the Pac-10. The team played home games at Reser Stadium in Corvallis, Oregon.

== Schedule ==
The Beavers' home game against Montana State, scheduled for September 15, was canceled due to the September 11 attacks. A replacement game against Northern Arizona was scheduled for November 17.

Date	Time	Opponent	Rank	Site	TV	Result	Attendance	Source
September 2	6:30 pm	at Fresno State*	No. 10	Bulldog Stadium; Fresno, CA	ESPN2	L 24–44	42,410	
September 8	6:00 pm	at New Mexico State*	No. 22	Aggie Memorial Stadium; Las Cruces, NM		W 27–22	27,238	
September 29	12:30 pm	No. 12 UCLA	No. 19	Reser Stadium; Corvallis, OR	ABC	L 7–38	36,521	
October 6	2:00 pm	at Washington State		Martin Stadium; Pullman, Washington	FSNNW	L 27–34	35,283	
October 13	7:15 pm	Arizona		Reser Stadium; Corvallis, OR	FSN	W 38–3	36,619	
October 20	7:00 pm	at Arizona State		Sun Devil Stadium; Tempe, AZ		L 24–41	54,114	
October 27	1:00 pm	California		Reser Stadium; Corvallis, OR		W 19–10	36,142	
November 3	12:30 pm	at USC		Los Angeles Memorial Coliseum; Los Angeles, CA	ABC	L 13–16 ^{OT}	44,880	
November 10	12:30 pm	No. 8 Washington		Reser Stadium; Corvallis, OR	FSN	W 49–24	36,682	
November 17	1:30 pm	No. 13 (I-AA) Northern Arizona*		Reser Stadium; Corvallis, OR		W 45–10	39,096	
December 1	1:30 pm	at No. 4 Oregon		Autzen Stadium; Eugene, OR (Civil War)	ABC	L 14–17	46,075	
*Non-conference game; Rankings from AP Poll released prior to the game; All times are in Pacific time

== Rankings ==
Ranking movements Legend: ██ Increase in ranking ██ Decrease in ranking — = Not ranked
	Week																
Poll	Pre	1	2	3	4	5	6	7	8	9	10	11	12	13	14	15	Final
AP	11	10	22	22	19	—	—	—	—	—	—	—	—	—	—	—	—
Coaches																	
Harris	Not released																Not released
BCS	Not released								—	—	—	—	—	—	—	—	Not released

== Game summaries ==
=== New Mexico State ===
Team	1	2	3	4	Total
• Oregon State	14	0	3	10	27
New Mexico State	0	9	0	13	22

- Date: September 8
- Location: Las Cruces, New Mexico
- Game attendance: 27,238

Scoring summary
1	7:13	ORST	Ken Simonton 1-yard run (Ryan Cesca kick)	Oregon State 7–0
1	1:08	ORST	Patrick McCall 22-yard run (Ryan Cesca kick)	Oregon St 14–0
2	4:26	NMST	Dan Aguiniga 26-yard field goal	Oregon State 14–3
2	:45	NMST	Kenton Keith 1-yard run (kick failed)	Oregon State 14–9
3	5:06	ORST	Ryan Cesca 47-yard field goal	Oregon State 17–9
4	12:58	ORST	Ken Simonton 1-yard run (Ryan Cesca kick)	Oregon State 24–9
4	8:31	NMST	Kenton Keith 4-yard run (Dan Aguiniga kick)	Oregon State 24–16
4	3:13	ORST	Ryan Cesca 24-yard field goal	Oregon State 27–16
4	1:33	NMST	Manuel Talbert 31-yard pass from KC Enzminger (two-point conversion failed)	Oregon State 27–22

=== Arizona ===
Team	1	2	3	4	Total
Arizona	0	0	3	0	3
• Oregon State	14	14	7	3	38

- Date: October 13
- Location: Reser Stadium, Corvallis, Oregon
- Game attendance: 36,619

Scoring summary
1	ORST	Newton 2-yard pass from Smith (Cesca kick)	Oregon State 7–0
1	ORST	Farley 24-yard blocked punt return (Cesca kick)	Oregon State 14–0
2	ORST	Smith 1-yard run (Cesca kick)	Oregon State 21–0
2	ORST	Clasen 26-yard pass from D. Anderson (Cesca kick)	Oregon State 28–0
3	ORST	Simonton 1-yard run (Cesca kick)	Oregon State 35–0
3	ARIZ	Keel 28-yard field goal	Oregon State 35–3
4	ORST	Cesca 38-yard field goal	Oregon State 38–3

== Roster ==
2001 Oregon State Beavers football team roster
Players
Coaches
Offense

Pos.	#	Name	Class
QB	14	Derek Anderson	Fr
OL	61	Dustin Janz	Sr
WR	20	Riley Jenkins	So
QB	9	Jonathan Smith	Sr

Defense

Pos.	#	Name	Class
LB	34	James Allen	Sr
LB	42	Nick Barnett	Jr
FS	22	Jason Jacobs	So
DT	93	David Lose	So
DT	99	Eric Manning	Jr
CB	21	Dennis Weathersby	Jr
CB	36	Aric Williams	Fr

Special teams

Pos.	#	Name	Class
PK	47	Kirk Yliniemi	So

Head coach

- Dennis Erickson

Coordinators/assistant coaches

Legend

- (C) Team captain
- (S) Suspended
- (I) Ineligible
- Injured
- Redshirt

Roster
