= 2001 Arizona State Sun Devils football team =

American college football season

2001 Arizona State Sun Devils football
- Conference: Pacific-10 Conference
- Record: 4–7 (1–7 Pac-10)
- Head coach: Dirk Koetter (1st season)
- Defensive coordinator: Brent Guy (1st season)
- Home stadium: Sun Devil Stadium

2001 Pacific-10 Conference football standings
	Conf.			Overall
Team	W		L	W		L
No. 2 Oregon $	7	–	1	11	–	1
No. 10 Washington State	6	–	2	10	–	2
No. 16 Stanford	6	–	2	9	–	3
No. 19 Washington	6	–	2	8	–	4
USC	5	–	3	6	–	6
UCLA	4	–	4	7	–	4
Oregon State	3	–	5	5	–	6
Arizona	2	–	6	5	–	6
Arizona State	1	–	7	4	–	7
California	0	–	8	1	–	10
$ – Conference champion; Rankings from AP Poll

The 2001 Arizona State Sun Devils football team represented Arizona State University as a member of the Pacific-10 Conference (Pac-10) during the 2001 NCAA Division I-A football season. Led by first-year head coach Dirk Koetter, the Sun Devils compiled an overall record of 4–7 with a mark of 1–7 in conference play, placing ninth in the Pac-10. The team played home games at Sun Devil Stadium in Tempe, Arizona.

== Schedule ==
Date	Time	Opponent	Site	TV	Result	Attendance
September 8	7:00 pm	San Diego State*	Sun Devil Stadium; Tempe, AZ		W 38–7	54,071
September 22	7:00 pm	at Stanford	Stanford Stadium; Stanford, CA	FSNAZ	L 28–51	39,580
September 29	7:00 pm	San Jose State*	Sun Devil Stadium; Tempe, AZ	FSNAZ	W 53–15	45,528
October 6	7:00 pm	Louisiana–Lafayette*	Sun Devil Stadium; Tempe, AZ		W 63–27	38,118
October 13	3:30 pm	at USC	Los Angeles Memorial Coliseum; Los Angeles, CA	FSN	L 17–48	43,508
October 20	7:00 pm	Oregon State	Sun Devil Stadium; Tempe, AZ		W 41–24	54,114
October 27	7:15 pm	No. 13 Washington	Sun Devil Stadium; Tempe, AZ	FSN	L 31–33	50,106
November 3	8:15 pm	at No. 8 Oregon	Autzen Stadium; Eugene, OR	FSN	L 24–42	46,064
November 10	4:30 pm	No. 11 Washington State^{†}	Sun Devil Stadium; Tempe, AZ	FSN	L 16–28	47,229
November 22	1:00 pm	Arizona	Sun Devil Stadium; Tempe, AZ (rivalry)	FSN	L 21–34	55,831
December 1	3:00 pm	at UCLA	Rose Bowl; Pasadena, CA	FSNAZ	L 42–52	45,271
*Non-conference game; ^{†}Homecoming; Rankings from AP Poll released prior to the game; All times are in Mountain time

== Game summaries ==
=== Oregon State ===
Team	1	2	3	4	Total
Oregon State	14	3	7	0	24
• Arizona State	13	0	7	21	41

- Date: October 20
- Location: Sun Devil Stadium, Tempe, AZ
- Game attendance: 54,114

Scoring summary
Q1	13:00	ASU	Barth 39 yard field goal	ASU 3–0
Q1	9:15	ORST	Simonton 1 yard run (Cesca kick)	ORST 7–3
Q1	6:56	ORST	Euhus 40 yard pass from Smith (Cesca kick)	ORST 14–3
Q1	5:17	ASU	McDonald 65 yard pass from Krohn (Barth kick)	ORST 14–10
Q1	:10	ASU	Barth 24 yard field goal	ORST 14–13
Q2	:46	ORST	Cesca 40 yard field goal	ORST 17–13
Q3	14:37	ASU	Flowers 74 yard run (Barth kick)	ASU 20–17
Q3	6:47	ORST	Newson 7 yard pass from Smith (Cesca kick)	ORST 24–20
Q4	10:39	ASU	Flowers 28 yard run (Barth kick)	ASU 27–24
Q4	7:06	ASU	Dennard 23 yard pass from Taplin (Barth kick)	ASU 34–24
Q4	2:39	ASU	Pace 11 yard run (Barth kick)	ASU 41–24

- Delvon Flowers 23 Rush, 226 Yds (sixth highest in school history)

== Roster ==
2001 Arizona State Sun Devils football team roster
Players
Coaches
Offense

Pos.	#	Name	Class
OT	78	Levi Jones	Jr
G	69	Kyle Kosier	Jr
WR	81	Shaun McDonald	Jr
C	53	Scott Peters	Sr

Defense

Pos.	#	Name	Class
LB	1	Solomon Bates	Jr
LB	52	Mason Unck	Jr

Special teams

Pos.	#	Name	Class
P	35	Nick Murphy	Sr

Head coach

- Dirk Koetter

Coordinators/assistant coaches

Legend

- (C) Team captain
- (S) Suspended
- (I) Ineligible
- Injured
- Redshirt
