= Keenan Howry =

American football player (born 1981)

No. 82
- Positions: Return specialist, wide receiver

Personal information
- Born: June 17, 1981 (age 45); Los Angeles, California, U.S.
- Listed height: 5 ft 10 in (1.78 m)
- Listed weight: 178 lb (81 kg)

Career information
- High school: Los Alamitos (Los Alamitos, California)
- College: Oregon
- NFL draft: 2003: 7th round, 221st overall pick

Career history
- Minnesota Vikings (2003–2005); Seattle Seahawks (2006)*; Calgary Stampeders (2007)*; Hamilton Tiger-Cats (2007)*
- * Offseason or practice squad member only

Awards and highlights
- Third-team All-American (2001); 2× First-team All-Pac-10 (2001, 2002)

Career NFL statistics
- Receptions: 3
- Receiving yards: 18
- Return yards: 674
- Stats at Pro Football Reference

Keenan Rashaun Howry (born June 17, 1981) is an American former professional football player who was a wide receiver and return specialist for three seasons with the Minnesota Vikings of the National Football League (NFL). He played college football for the Oregon Ducks. He was selected in the seventh round of the 2003 NFL draft by the Vikings.

== Early life ==
Howry played high school football at Los Alamitos High School in Los Alamitos, California.

== College career ==
Howry played college football for the Oregon Ducks from 1999 to 2002. He caught 49 passes for 649 yards and eight touchdowns while also returning 32 punts for 465 yards and two touchdowns in 2001, earning first-team All-Pac-10 Conference honors on both offense and special teams. The Associated Press also named him a third-team All-American on special teams in 2001. In 2002, Howry totaled 40 receptions for 784 yards and five touchdowns while returning 32 punts for 458 yards and two touchdowns, garnering first-team All-Pac-10 Conference recognition on special teams. Overall, he caught 162 passes for 2,552 yards and 22 touchdowns while also returning 100 punts for 1,216 yards and four touchdowns during his college career.

== Professional career ==
=== Minnesota Vikings ===
Howry was selected by the Minnesota Vikings in the seventh round, with the 221st overall pick, of the 2003 NFL draft. He officially signed with the team on July 21, 2003. He played in 16 games, starting one, during his rookie season, returning 35 punts for 247 yards and 12 kicks for 271 yards while also catching two passes for 15 yards.

Howry appeared in three games for the Vikings in 2004, returning 12 punts for 78 yards and recording one reception for three yards, before being placed on injured reserve on October 13, 2004. He was waived by the Vikings the next season on October 22, 2005.

=== Seattle Seahawks ===
Howry signed a reserve/future contract with the Seattle Seahawks on January 5, 2006. He was waived/injured on August 28, 2006, and reverted to injured reserve the next day. He was waived by the Seahawks on August 30, 2006.

=== Calgary Stampeders ===
Howry was signed by the Calgary Stampeders of the Canadian Football League (CFL) on May 11, 2007. He was released on June 18, 2007.

=== Hamilton Tiger-Cats ===
Howry then signed with the Hamilton Tiger-Cats. He was released on June 24, 2007, and signed to the practice roster the next day.
