= Rashad Bauman =

American football player (born 1979)

No. 25, 21
- Position: Cornerback

Personal information
- Born: May 7, 1979 (age 47); Tempe, Arizona, U.S.
- Listed height: 5 ft 8 in (1.73 m)
- Listed weight: 184 lb (83 kg)

Career information
- High school: South Mountain (Phoenix, Arizona)
- College: Oregon
- NFL draft: 2002: 3rd round, 79th overall pick

Career history
- Washington Redskins (2002–2003); Cincinnati Bengals (2004–2006)

Awards and highlights
- Third-team All-American (2000); First-team All-Pac-10 (2000); Second-team All-Pac-10 (2001)

Career NFL statistics
- Tackles: 57
- Interceptions: 2
- Passes defended: 8
- Stats at Pro Football Reference

Leddure Rashad Bauman (born May 7, 1979) is an American former professional football player in the National Football League (NFL) who played cornerback. He attended the University of Oregon and was a third-team All-American selection by the NFL Draft Report, as well as an All-Pac-10 second-team choice. He was selected in the third round in the 79th overall pick of the 2002 NFL draft. He played two seasons with the Washington Redskins before being traded to Cincinnati in 2004. He recorded 50 tackles and 2 interceptions in a 43-game career.
