= 2001 USC Trojans football team =

American college football season

2001 USC Trojans football

Las Vegas Bowl, L 6–10 vs. Utah
- Conference: Pacific-10 Conference
- Record: 6–6 (5–3 Pac-10)
- Head coach: Pete Carroll (1st season)
- Offensive coordinator: Norm Chow (1st season)
- Offensive scheme: Pro-style
- Base defense: 4–3
- Captains: Charlie Landrigan; Troy Polamalu; Antuan Simmons
- Home stadium: Los Angeles Memorial Coliseum

2001 Pacific-10 Conference football standings
	Conf.			Overall
Team	W		L	W		L
No. 2 Oregon $	7	–	1	11	–	1
No. 10 Washington State	6	–	2	10	–	2
No. 16 Stanford	6	–	2	9	–	3
No. 19 Washington	6	–	2	8	–	4
USC	5	–	3	6	–	6
UCLA	4	–	4	7	–	4
Oregon State	3	–	5	5	–	6
Arizona	2	–	6	5	–	6
Arizona State	1	–	7	4	–	7
California	0	–	8	1	–	10
$ – Conference champion; Rankings from AP Poll

The 2001 USC Trojans football team represented the University of Southern California in the 2001 NCAA Division I-A football season. It was Pete Carroll's first year as head coach. The Kansas State Wildcats's victory on September 8 marked the last time a non-Pac-10 team defeated the Trojans in the Coliseum until November 27, 2010, when the Notre Dame Fighting Irish defeated the Trojans, 20–16.

== Schedule ==
Date	Time	Opponent	Site	TV	Result	Attendance
September 1	3:30 p.m.	San Jose State*	Los Angeles Memorial Coliseum; Los Angeles, CA	FSN West	W 21–10	45,568
September 8	3:30 p.m.	No. 12 Kansas State*	Los Angeles Memorial Coliseum; Los Angeles, CA	FSN	L 6–10	69,959
September 22	7:00 p.m.	at No. 7 Oregon	Autzen Stadium; Eugene, OR	FSN	L 22–24	45,765
September 29	3:30 p.m.	Stanford	Los Angeles Memorial Coliseum; Los Angeles, CA (rivalry)	FSN West	L 16–21	53,962
October 6	12:30 p.m.	at No. 11 Washington	Husky Stadium; Seattle, WA	FSN	L 24–27	72,946
October 13	3:30 p.m.	Arizona State	Los Angeles Memorial Coliseum; Los Angeles, CA	FSN	W 48–17	43,508
October 20	10:30 a.m.	at Notre Dame*	Notre Dame Stadium; Notre Dame, IN (rivalry)	NBC	L 16–27	80,795
October 27	3:30 p.m.	at Arizona	Arizona Stadium; Tucson, AZ	FSNW2	W 41–34	46,399
November 3	12:30 p.m.	Oregon State^{†}	Los Angeles Memorial Stadium; Los Angeles, CA	ABC	W 16–13 ^{OT}	44,880
November 10	12:30 p.m.	at California	California Memorial Stadium; Berkeley, CA		W 55–14	33,506
November 17	3:30 p.m.	No. 20 UCLA	Los Angeles Memorial Stadium; Los Angeles, CA (Victory Bell)	FSN	W 27–0	88,588
December 25	12:30 p.m.	vs. Utah*	Sam Boyd Stadium; Whitney, NV (Las Vegas Bowl)	ABC	L 6–10	22,385
*Non-conference game; ^{†}Homecoming; Rankings from AP Poll released prior to the game; All times are in Pacific time

== Game summaries ==
=== vs San Jose State ===
	1	2	3	4	Total
Spartans	0	3	0	7	10
Trojans	7	7	0	7	21

=== vs No. 12 Kansas State ===
	1	2	3	4	Total
No. 12 Wildcats	3	7	0	0	10
Trojans	0	0	6	0	6

=== at No. 7 Oregon ===
	1	2	3	4	Total
Trojans	3	3	7	9	22
No. 7 Ducks	7	7	7	3	24

=== vs Stanford ===
	1	2	3	4	Total
Cardinal	7	14	0	0	21
Trojans	0	0	10	6	16

=== at No. 11 Washington ===
	1	2	3	4	Total
Trojans	0	14	3	7	24
No. 11 Huskies	7	0	7	13	27

=== vs Arizona State ===
	1	2	3	4	Total
Sun Devils	3	7	7	0	17
Trojans	0	21	14	13	48

=== at Notre Dame ===
	1	2	3	4	Total
Trojans	7	6	3	0	16
Fighting Irish	3	7	7	10	27

=== at Arizona ===
	1	2	3	4	Total
Trojans	3	28	0	10	41
Wildcats	10	3	14	7	34

=== vs Oregon State ===
	1	2	3	4	OT	Total
Beavers	0	3	7	0	3	13
Trojans	7	0	3	0	6	16

=== at California ===
	1	2	3	4	Total
Trojans	7	21	10	17	55
Golden Bears	7	0	7	0	14

=== vs No. 20 UCLA ===
	1	2	3	4	Total
No. 20 Bruins	0	0	0	0	0
Trojans	14	3	7	3	27

=== Las Vegas Bowl (vs Utah) ===
	1	2	3	4	Total
Utes	7	3	0	0	10
Trojans	0	0	6	0	6

== Roster ==
2001 USC Trojans football team roster
Players
Coaches
Offense

Pos.	#	Name	Class
QB	10	Matt Cassel	Fr
WR	2	Kareem Kelly	Jr
FB	21	Malaefou MacKenzie	Jr
RB	4	Sultan McCullough	Jr
QB	3	Carson Palmer	Jr
OT	77	Jacob Rogers	So

Defense

Pos.	#	Name	Class
DT	90	Ryan Nielsen	Sr
S	43	Troy Polamalu	Jr
DT	93	Bernard Riley	Jr

Special teams

Pos.	#	Name	Class

Head coach

- Pete Carroll

Coordinators/assistant coaches

Legend

- (C) Team captain
- (S) Suspended
- (I) Ineligible
- Injured
- Redshirt

Roster
Last update: 2001-12-04

== Team players in the NFL ==
- Marcell Allmond
- Kevin Arbet
- Chris Cash
- Matt Cassel
- Shaun Cody
- Keary Colbert
- Kori Dickerson
- Justin Fargas
- Lonnie Ford
- Matt Grootegoed
- Gregg Guenther
- Alex Holmes
- Norm Katnik
- Kareem Kelly
- David Kirtman
- Jason Leach
- Matt Leinart
- Malaefou MacKenzie
- Grant Mattos
- Sultan McCullough
- Ryan Nielsen
- Carson Palmer
- Mike Patterson
- Troy Polamalu
- Kris Richard
- Bernard Riley
- Jacob Rogers
- Antuan Simmons
- Kenechi Udeze
- Lenny Vandermade
- John Walker
- Lee Webb
