= 2001 UCLA Bruins football team =

American college football season

2001 UCLA Bruins football
- Conference: Pacific-10 Conference
- Record: 7–4 (4–4 Pac-10)
- Head coach: Bob Toledo (6th season)
- Offensive coordinator: Kelly Skipper (1st season)
- Offensive scheme: Pro-style
- Defensive coordinator: Phil Snow (1st season)
- Base defense: 4–3
- Home stadium: Rose Bowl

2001 Pacific-10 Conference football standings
	Conf.			Overall
Team	W		L	W		L
No. 2 Oregon $	7	–	1	11	–	1
No. 10 Washington State	6	–	2	10	–	2
No. 16 Stanford	6	–	2	9	–	3
No. 19 Washington	6	–	2	8	–	4
USC	5	–	3	6	–	6
UCLA	4	–	4	7	–	4
Oregon State	3	–	5	5	–	6
Arizona	2	–	6	5	–	6
Arizona State	1	–	7	4	–	7
California	0	–	8	1	–	10
$ – Conference champion; Rankings from AP Poll

The 2001 UCLA Bruins football team represented the University of California, Los Angeles in the 2001 NCAA Division I-A football season. They played their home games at the Rose Bowl in Pasadena, California and were led by head coach Bob Toledo. Despite a winning record, the Bruins decided not to participate in a bowl game, fearing that the program would lose several hundred thousand dollars to play in a lower-tiered bowl.

== Schedule ==
Date	Time	Opponent	Rank	Site	TV	Result	Attendance
September 1	4:45 pm	at No. 25 Alabama*	No. 17	Bryant–Denny Stadium; Tuscaloosa, AL (College GameDay)	ESPN	W 20–17	83,818
September 8	9:30 am	at Kansas*	No. 14	Memorial Stadium; Lawrence, KS	FSN	W 41–17	43,500
September 22	12:30 pm	No. 21 Ohio State*	No. 14	Rose Bowl; Pasadena, CA	ABC	W 13–6	73,723
September 29	12:30 pm	at No. 19 Oregon State	No. 12	Reser Stadium; Corvallis, OR	ABC	W 38–7	36,521
October 13	12:30 pm	No. 10 Washington	No. 7	Rose Bowl; Pasadena, CA	ABC	W 35–13	70,377
October 20	7:15 pm	California^{†}	No. 4	Rose Bowl; Pasadena, CA (rivalry)	FSN	W 51–17	65,366
October 27	12:30 pm	at No. 20 Stanford	No. 4	Stanford Stadium; Stanford, CA (rivalry)	ABC	L 28–38	64,495
November 3	3:30 pm	at No. 16 Washington State	No. 9	Martin Stadium; Pullman, WA	FSN	L 14–20	33,462
November 10	12:30 pm	No. 7 Oregon	No. 17	Rose Bowl; Pasadena, CA	ABC	L 20–21	78,330
November 17	3:30 pm	at USC	No. 20	Los Angeles Memorial Coliseum; Los Angeles, CA (Victory Bell)	FSN	L 0–27	88,588
December 1	2:00 pm	Arizona State		Rose Bowl; Pasadena, CA	FSN	W 52–42	45,271
*Non-conference game; ^{†}Homecoming; Rankings from AP Poll released prior to the game; All times are in Pacific time

== Game summaries ==
=== Alabama ===
Team	1	2	3	4	Total
• No. 17 Bruins	0	7	13	0	20
No. 25 Crimson Tide	7	3	0	7	17

- Date: September 1
- Location: Bryant–Denny Stadium
- Game attendance: 83,818

Scoring summary
Q1	6:06	ALA	Carter 78 yard pass from Watts (Thomas kick)	ALA 7–0
Q2	13:49	ALA	Thomas 30 yard field goal	ALA 10–0
Q2	8:30	UCLA	Ieremia-Stansbury 10 yard run (Griffith kick)	ALA 10–7
Q3	9:03	UCLA	Perry 53 yard pass from Paus (Griffith kick)	UCLA 14–10
Q3	6:45	UCLA	Griffith 30 yard field goal	UCLA 17–10
Q3	1:23	UCLA	Griffith 45 yard field goal	UCLA 20–10
Q4	2:13	ALA	Milons 71 yard pass from Zow (Thomas kick)	UCLA 20–17

== Roster ==
2001 UCLA Bruins football team roster
Players
Coaches
Offense

Pos.	#	Name	Class
TE	81	Bryan Fletcher	Sr
RB	26	DeShaun Foster	Sr
QB	10	Cory Paus	Jr
WR	1	Tab Perry	Fr
TE	18	Mike Seidman	Jr
RB	32	Matt Stanley	Sr
RB	15	Ed Stansbury	Jr
TE		Keith Carter	Fr

Defense

Pos.	#	Name	Class
S	7	Marques Anderson	Sr
DE	43	Dave Ball	So
DE	49	Mat Ball	So
LB	11	Brandon Chillar	So
DT	99	Kenyon Coleman	Sr
DB	24	Ben Emanuel	Fr
DT	77	Rodney Leisle	So
CB	9	Ricky Manning	Jr
LB	47	Ryan Nece	Sr
DE	90	Adam Peters	Sr
LB	44	Marcus Reese	Jr
LB	8	Robert Thomas	Sr
DB	17	Matthew Ware	Fr

Special teams

Pos.	#	Name	Class
LS	58	Jeff Grau	Sr
P	39	Chris Kluwe	Fr

Head coach

- Bob Toledo

Coordinators/assistant coaches

Legend

- (C) Team captain
- (S) Suspended
- (I) Ineligible
- Injured
- Redshirt
