= Chris Lewis (American football) =

American football player (born 1980)

Profile
- Position: Quarterback

Personal information
- Born: December 13, 1980 (age 45); Long Beach, California, U.S.
- Listed height: 6 ft 3 in (1.91 m)
- Listed weight: 215 lb (98 kg)

Career information
- High school: Long Beach Polytechnic
- College: Stanford
- NFL draft: 2004: undrafted

Career history
- Arizona Cardinals (2004–2005)*; Cologne Centurions (2005); San Jose SaberCats (2006)
- * Offseason or practice squad member only

Chris Lewis (born December 13, 1980) is an American former football player. He played college football for the Stanford Cardinal.

== Early life ==
Lewis was born and grew up in Long Beach, California, and attended Long Beach Polytechnic High School, where he played football and volleyball. He was a four-year starter at quarterback and was named All-California Interscholastic Federation (CIF) as a junior and senior and named first-team All-Moore League three times. As a senior, Lewis completed 174 of 293 pass attempts for 3,170 yards and 43 touchdowns and was named the CIF Offensive Player of the Year and the Gatorade National Player of the Year. He finished his high school career with 8,616 passing yards and a California-record 107 touchdown passes. Lewis committed to play college football at Stanford, where his older sister Robyn was playing volleyball.

== College career ==
Lewis redshirted his freshman year at Stanford. He began his redshirt freshman season as the backup to starter Randy Fasani. Lewis saw his first significant playing action against fifth-ranked Texas after Fasani suffered an injury and completed 12 of 33 pass attempts for 214 yards and three touchdowns, including a touchdown pass with less than two minutes left put the Cardinal ahead in a 27–24 upset victory. He started the next three games while Fasani recovered from his injury. Lewis finished the season with 1,179 passing yards on 92-for-204 passing with eight touchdown passes and five interceptions.

Lewis began his redshirt sophomore season as the second-string quarterback again, but ultimately started four games and passed for 1,277 yards with 12 touchdown passes and eight interceptions. He entered the Cardinal's game against fifth-ranked Oregon late in the second quarter following an injury to Fasani and completed 12 of 26 passes for 189 and two touchdowns in a comeback 49–42 victory. Lewis passed for 250 yards and three touchdowns as Stanford won 38–28 over fourth-ranked UCLA. Lewis was named Stanford's starting quarterback going into his redshirt junior year. He missed the season opener after being suspended for a minor NCAA infraction. Lewis started the next five games before suffering a season-ending shoulder injury.

Lewis ultimately lost his starting job during the offseason to Trent Edwards. He returned to the starting lineup after Edwards suffered a shoulder injury and started seven games during his redshirt senior season. Lewis finished his collegiate career with 19 starts and 30 total games played, completing 350 of 713 pass attempts for 4,346 yards with 33 touchdown passes and 31 interceptions.

== Professional career ==
Lewis was signed as an undrafted free agent by the Arizona Cardinals on June 7, 2004. He was released at the end of training camp and spent time during the regular season on the Cardinals' practice squad. In 2005, the Cardinals allocated Lewis to the Cologne Centurions of NFL Europe. He played in nine games for Cologne and passed for 412 yards. Lewis was released by the Cardinals on June 24, 2005. Lewis was a member of the San Jose SaberCats of the Arena Football League in 2006.
