= 2001 Washington State Cougars football team =

American college football season

2001 Washington State Cougars football
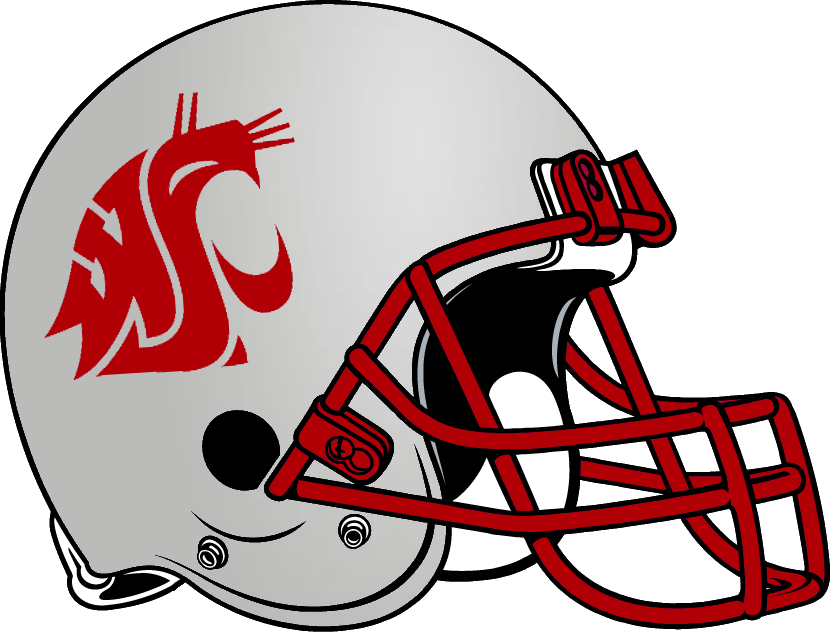

Sun Bowl champion

Sun Bowl, W 33–27 vs. Purdue
- Conference: Pacific-10 Conference

Ranking
- Coaches: No. 11
- AP: No. 10
- Record: 10–2 (6–2 Pac-10)
- Head coach: Mike Price (13th season)
- Offensive coordinator: Mike Levenseller (1st season)
- Offensive scheme: Spread
- Defensive coordinator: Bill Doba (8th season)
- Base defense: 4–3
- Home stadium: Martin Stadium

2001 Pacific-10 Conference football standings
| | Conf. | | | Overall |
| Team | W | | L | W | | L |
|---|---|---|---|---|---|---|
| No. 2 Oregon $ | 7 | – | 1 | 11 | – | 1 |
| No. 10 Washington State | 6 | – | 2 | 10 | – | 2 |
| No. 16 Stanford | 6 | – | 2 | 9 | – | 3 |
| No. 19 Washington | 6 | – | 2 | 8 | – | 4 |
| USC | 5 | – | 3 | 6 | – | 6 |
| UCLA | 4 | – | 4 | 7 | – | 4 |
| Oregon State | 3 | – | 5 | 5 | – | 6 |
| Arizona | 2 | – | 6 | 5 | – | 6 |
| Arizona State | 1 | – | 7 | 4 | – | 7 |
| California | 0 | – | 8 | 1 | – | 10 |
$ – Conference champion; Rankings from AP Poll

The 2001 Washington State Cougars football team represented Washington State University as a member of the Pacific-10 Conference during the 2001 NCAA Division I-A football season. The team was led by 12th-year head coach Mike Price and played its home games on campus at Martin Stadium in Pullman, Washington.

Opening with seven straight wins, Washington State was 9–2 in the regular season and 6–2 in the conference play, placing in a three-way tie for second in the Pac-10. Invited to the Sun Bowl on New Year's Eve, the Cougars defeated Purdue for their tenth win, and were tenth in the final rankings.

Four defensive backs on the team, Lamont Thompson, Jason David, Marcus Trufant, and Erik Coleman, went on to play in the National Football League (NFL).

== Schedule ==
| Date | Time | Opponent | Rank | Site | TV | Result | Attendance | Source |
|---|---|---|---|---|---|---|---|---|
| August 30 | 7:00 pm | Idaho* | | Martin Stadium; Pullman, WA (Battle of the Palouse) | FSNNW | W 36–7 | 31,097 | |
| September 8 | 5:00 pm | at Boise State* | | Bronco Stadium; Boise, ID | | W 41–20 | 27,697 | |
| September 22 | 2:00 pm | California | | Martin Stadium; Pullman, WA | | W 51–20 | 21,534 | |
| September 29 | 7:00 pm | at Arizona | | Arizona Stadium; Tucson, AZ | | W 48–21 | 42,729 | |
| October 6 | 2:00 pm | Oregon State^{†} | | Martin Stadium; Pullman, WA | FSNNW | W 34–27 | 35,283 | |
| October 13 | 2:00 pm | at No. 23 Stanford | | Stanford Stadium; Stanford, CA | | W 45–39 | 40,950 | |
| October 18 | 7:00 pm | Montana State* | No. 19 | Martin Stadium; Pullman, WA | FSNNW | W 53–28 | 14,325 | |
| October 27 | 4:00 pm | No. 11 Oregon | No. 14 | Martin Stadium; Pullman, WA | ABC | L 17–24 | 34,150 | |
| November 3 | 3:30 pm | No. 9 UCLA | No. 16 | Martin Stadium; Pullman, WA | FSN | W 20–14 | 33,462 | |
| November 10 | 3:30 pm | at Arizona State | No. 11 | Sun Devil Stadium; Tempe, AZ | FSN | W 28–16 | 47,229 | |
| November 17 | 12:30 pm | at No. 16 Washington | No. 9 | Husky Stadium; Seattle, WA (Apple Cup) | ABC | L 14–26 | 74,442 | |
| December 31 | 11:30 am | vs. Purdue* | No. 13 | Sun Bowl; El Paso, Texas (Sun Bowl) | CBS | W 33–27 | 47,812 | |
*Non-conference game; ^{†}Homecoming; Rankings from AP Poll released prior to the game; All times are in Pacific time

== Game summaries ==
=== Idaho ===
| Team | 1 | 2 | 3 | 4 | Total |
|---|---|---|---|---|---|
| Idaho | 0 | 0 | 0 | 7 | 7 |
| • Washington State | 3 | 17 | 16 | 0 | 36 |

- Date: August 30
- Location: Martin Stadium, Pullman, Washington
- Game attendance: 31,097

Scoring summary
| 1 | 2:01 | WSU | Drew Dunning 26 yard field goal | Wash St 3–0 |
| 2 | 13:35 | WSU | Dave Minnich 30 yard run (Drew Dunning kick) | Wash St 10–0 |
| 2 | 7:22 | WSU | Drew Dunning 27 yard field goal | Wash St 13–0 |
| 2 | 3:09 | WSU | Trandon Harvey 18 yard pass from Jason Gesser (Drew Dunning kick) | Wash St 20–0 |
| 3 | 11:42 | WSU | Nakoa McElrath 5 yard pass from Jason Gesser (Drew Dunning kick) | Wash St 27–0 |
| 3 | 8:38 | WSU | Nakoa McElrath 35 yard pass from Jason Gesser (kick failed) | Wash St 33–0 |
| 3 | 4:51 | WSU | Drew Dunning 32 yard field goal | Wash St 36–0 |
| 3 | 3:11 | ID | Chris Lacy 4 yard pass from John Welsh (Keith Stamps kick) | Wash St 36–7 |
