= Larry Mac Duff =

American football player and coach (born 1948)

Profile
- Position: Defensive end

Personal information
- Born: June 22, 1948 (age 78); Clinton, Iowa, U.S.

Career information
- College: Oklahoma

Career history
- Stanford (1980–1983) Defensive line coach; Hawaii (1984–1986) Defensive line coach/Special teams coordinator; Arizona (1987–1996) Defensive coordinator; New York Giants (1997–2000) Special teams coordinator; Arizona (2001–2002) Defensive coordinator; San Francisco 49ers (2003–2006) Special teams coordinator; Texas (2007) Co-defensive coordinator; Las Vegas Locomotives (2009–2012) Defensive coordinator/Special teams coordinator; San Diego Fleet (2019) Special teams coordinator/Linebackers coach

Awards and highlights
- 2× UFL champion (2009, 2010)

Larry Mac Duff (born June 22, 1948) is an American football coach and former player. He played college football as a defensive end at Fullerton College (1966–1967) and Oklahoma (1968–1969).

Mac Duff has eight years of NFL coaching experience. He was the special teams coach for the New York Giants for four years (1997–2000). During this time, the Giants won two NFC East Championships and represented the NFC in Super Bowl XXXV. Mac Duff was Special Teams Coordinator for the San Francisco 49ers for four years (2003–2006).

Mac Duff was the defensive coordinator for the "Desert Swarm” Defense at the University of Arizona. In 1992, the U of A Defense led the nation in scoring defense, allowing only 8.9 points per game and finished 2nd nationally in total defense. In 1993, Arizona led the nation in rushing defense, allowing only 30.1 yards per game and again finished second nationally in total defense.

Mac Duff has helped mentor a Nagurski Trophy winner (Rob Waldrop – 1993), an Outland Trophy winner (Waldrop – 1993), a Thorpe Award winner (Darryll Lewis – 1990), a Lombardi Award finalist / NCAA Career Sack Champion (Tedy Bruschi – 1995), and five Pac-10 Defensive Players of the Year. Mac Duff was co-defensive coordinator for the University of Texas, during their 2007 season, which culminated with 10 wins and a victory over Arizona State in the Holiday Bowl.

From 2009 to 2012, he served as the defensive coordinator and special teams coordinator for the Las Vegas Locomotives of the United Football League (UFL) from 2009 to 2012. The team won the UFL Championship in 2009 and 2010. In 2019, he was the linebackers coach and special teams coordinator for the San Diego Fleet of the Alliance of American Football (AAF).
