= 2001–02 NCAA football bowl games =

College football postseason game series

- Number of bowl games per state.
- Season: 2001
- Number of bowls: 25
- All-star games: 5
- Bowl games: December 18, 2001 – January 3, 2002
- National Championship: Rose Bowl
- Location of Championship: Rose Bowl Stadium; Pasadena, California
- Champions: Miami Hurricanes
Bowl record by conference
Conference	Bowls	Record	Number of teams in final AP poll
SEC	8	5–3 (0.625)	5
Big 12	8	3–5 (0.375)	4
ACC	6	4–2 (0.667)	3
Big Ten	6	2–4 (0.333)	2
Big East	5	4–1 (0.800)	4
Pac-10	5	2–3 (0.400)	4
Conference USA	4	1–3 (0.250)	1
Mountain West	3	2–1 (0.667)	1
MAC	2	2–0 (1.000)	1
WAC	2	0–2 (0.000)	0
Sun Belt	1	0–1 (0.000)	0

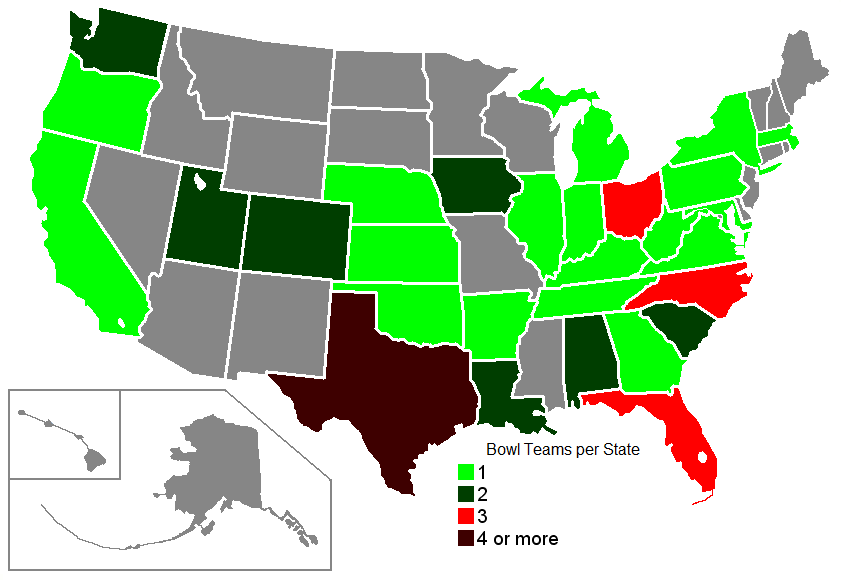
Number of bowl teams per state.

The 2001–02 NCAA football bowl games concluded the 2001 NCAA Division I-A football season. The Miami Hurricanes won the BCS National Championship Game over the Nebraska Cornhuskers, 37–14.

A total of 25 team-competitive games were played—starting on December 18, 2001, and ending on January 3, 2002—with participation by 50 bowl-eligible teams. North Texas entered the New Orleans Bowl with a losing record of 5–6; they were able to play in a bowl game by being co-champions of the Sun Belt Conference, having compiled a 5–1 conference record. An additional five all-star games were played, ending with the Hula Bowl on February 2, 2002. One bowl game was established for the 2001–02 season, the New Orleans Bowl. The number of bowl games remained static from the previous season due to the dissolution of the Aloha Bowl after 19 seasons.

== Poll rankings ==
The below table lists top teams (per polls taken after the completion of the regular season and any conference championship games), their win–loss records (prior to bowl games), and the bowls they later played in. The AP column represents rankings per the AP Poll, while the BCS column represents the Bowl Championship Series rankings.

AP	BCS	Team	W–L	Bowl
1	1	Miami Hurricanes	11–0	Rose Bowl †
2	4	Oregon Ducks	10–1	Fiesta Bowl †
3	3	Colorado Buffaloes	10–2	Fiesta Bowl †
4	2	Nebraska Cornhuskers	11–1	Rose Bowl †
5	5	Florida Gators	9–2	Orange Bowl †
6	10	Maryland Terrapins	10–1	Orange Bowl †
7	8	Illinois Fighting Illini	10–1	Sugar Bowl †
8	6	Tennessee Volunteers	10–2	Florida Citrus Bowl
9	7	Texas Longhorns	10–2	Holiday Bowl
10	11	Oklahoma Sooners	10–2	Cotton Bowl Classic
11	9	Stanford Cardinal	9–2	Seattle Bowl
12	13	LSU Tigers	9–3	Sugar Bowl †
13	12	Washington State Cougars	9–2	Sun Bowl
14	14	South Carolina Gamecocks	8–3	Outback Bowl
15	—	Virginia Tech Hokies	8–3	Gator Bowl
16	—	Georgia Bulldogs	8–3	Music City Bowl
17	—	Michigan Wolverines	8–3	Florida Citrus Bowl
18	—	Syracuse Orangemen	9–3	Insight.com Bowl
19	—	BYU Cougars	12–1	Liberty Bowl
20	—	Fresno State Bulldogs	11–2	Silicon Valley Football Classic
21	15	Washington Huskies	8–3	Holiday Bowl
22	—	Ohio State Buckeyes	7–4	Outback Bowl
23	—	Louisville Cardinals	10–2	Liberty Bowl
24	—	Florida State Seminoles	7–4	Gator Bowl
25	—	Toledo Rockets	9–2	Motor City Bowl

† denotes a BCS bowl game

== Non-BCS bowls ==
Date	Time	Game	Site	Matchup	Ref.
Dec 18	8:00 PM	New Orleans Bowl	Louisiana Superdome; New Orleans, Louisiana	Colorado State 45, North Texas 20	
Dec 19	8:00 PM	GMAC Bowl	Ladd–Peebles Stadium; Mobile, Alabama	Marshall 64, East Carolina 61 (2 OT)	
Dec 20	7:30 PM	Tangerine Bowl	Citrus Bowl; Orlando, Florida	Pittsburgh 34, N.C. State 19	
Dec 25	3:30 PM	Las Vegas Bowl	Sam Boyd Stadium; Whitney, Nevada	Utah 10, USC 6	
Dec 27	4:00 PM	Seattle Bowl	Safeco Field; Seattle, Washington	Georgia Tech 24, Stanford 14	
Dec 27	7:30 PM	Independence Bowl	Independence Stadium; Shreveport, Louisiana	Alabama 14, Iowa State 13	
Dec 28	1:30 PM	Galleryfurniture.com Bowl	Houston Astrodome; Houston, Texas	Texas A&M 28, TCU 9	
Dec 28	5:00 PM	Music City Bowl	Adelphia Coliseum; Nashville, Tennessee	Boston College 20, Georgia 16	
Dec 28	8:30 PM	Holiday Bowl	Qualcomm Stadium; San Diego, California	Texas 47, Washington 43	
Dec 29	12:00 PM	Motor City Bowl	Pontiac Silverdome; Pontiac, Michigan	Toledo 23, Cincinnati 16	
Dec 29	3:30 PM	Alamo Bowl	Alamodome; San Antonio, Texas	Iowa 19, Texas Tech 16	
Dec 29	5:30 PM	Insight Bowl	Bank One Ballpark; Phoenix, Arizona	Syracuse 26, Kansas State 3	
Dec 31	12:00 PM	Sun Bowl	Sun Bowl Stadium; El Paso, Texas	Washington State 33, Purdue 27	
Dec 31	12:30 PM	Humanitarian Bowl	Bronco Stadium; Boise, Idaho	Clemson 49, Louisiana Tech 24	
Dec 31	3:00 PM	Silicon Valley Football Classic	Spartan Stadium; San Jose, California	Michigan State 44, Fresno State 35	
Dec 31	4:00 PM	Liberty Bowl	Liberty Bowl Memorial Stadium; Memphis, Tennessee	Louisville 28, BYU 10	
Dec 31	7:30 PM	Peach Bowl	Georgia Dome; Atlanta, Georgia	North Carolina 16, Auburn 10	
Jan 1	11:00 AM	Outback Bowl	Raymond James Stadium; Tampa, Florida	South Carolina 31, Ohio State 28	
Jan 1	11:00 AM	Cotton Bowl Classic	Cotton Bowl; Dallas, Texas	Oklahoma 10, Arkansas 3	
Jan 1	12:30 PM	Gator Bowl	Alltel Stadium; Jacksonville, Florida	Florida State 30, Virginia Tech 17	
Jan 1	1:00 PM	Florida Citrus Bowl	Citrus Bowl; Orlando, Florida	Tennessee 45, Michigan 17	

All times are in Eastern Time.

== BCS bowls ==
Date	Time	Game	Site	Matchup	Ref.
Jan 1	4:30 PM	Fiesta Bowl	Sun Devil Stadium; Tempe, Arizona	Oregon 38, Colorado 16	
Jan 1	8:30 PM	Sugar Bowl	Louisiana Superdome; New Orleans, Louisiana	LSU 47, Illinois 34	
Jan 2	8:00 PM	Orange Bowl	Pro Player Stadium; Miami Gardens, Florida	Florida 56, Maryland 23	
Jan 3	8:00 PM	Rose Bowl (BCS National Championship Game)	Rose Bowl; Pasadena, California	Miami 37, Nebraska 14	

== All-star games ==
Date	Game	Winning Team		Losing Team		Venue	City
January 12, 2002	Paradise Bowl	West All-Stars	33	Utah-Colorado All-Stars	30	Hansen Stadium	St. George, Utah
January 12, 2002	East–West Shrine Game	West Team	21	East Team	13	SBC Park	San Francisco, California
January 26, 2002	Gridiron Classic	Team Florida	42	Team USA	13	Citrus Bowl	Orlando, Florida
January 26, 2002	Senior Bowl	South Team	41	North Team	26	Ladd–Peebles Stadium	Mobile, Alabama
February 2, 2002	Hula Bowl	South	45	North	28	War Memorial Stadium	Wailuku, Hawaii

Senior Bowl

- Game MVP: Antwaan Randle El (Indiana Hoosiers)
- Other notable players: David Carr, Ryan Sims, Patrick Ramsey, LeCharles Bentley, Javon Walker
- North coach: Mike Holmgren (Seattle Seahawks)
- South coach: Dave McGinnis (Arizona Cardinals)
