= 2002 Sugar Bowl =

2002 Nokia Sugar Bowl
- BCS Bowl Game; 68th Sugar Bowl
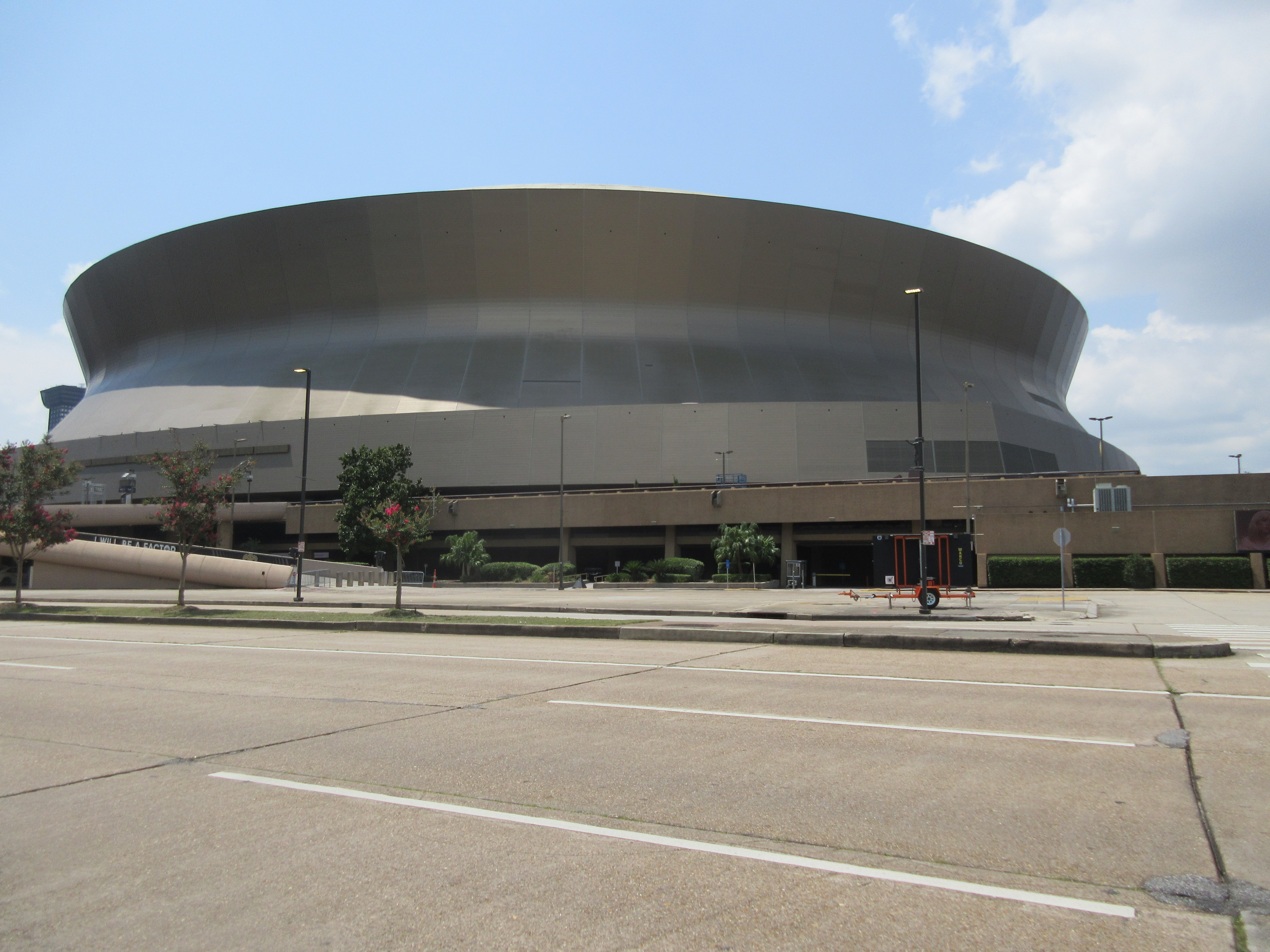
- The Louisiana Superdome in New Orleans, Louisiana, hosted the Sugar Bowl.
Illinois Fighting Illini	LSU Tigers
(10–1)	(9–3)
Big Ten	SEC
34	47
Head coach: Ron Turner	Head coach: Nick Saban
AP / Coaches / BCS; 7 / 7 / 8	AP / Coaches / BCS; 12 / 12 / 13
	1	2	3	4	Total
Illinois	0	7	14	13	34
LSU	7	27	7	6	47
- Date: January 1, 2002
- Season: 2001
- Stadium: Louisiana Superdome
- Location: New Orleans, Louisiana
- MVP: Rohan Davey (QB, LSU)
- Favorite: LSU by 2
- Referee: Steve Usechek (Big XII)
- Attendance: 77,688

United States TV coverage
- Network: ABC
- Announcers: Mike Tirico and David Norrie
- Nielsen ratings: 8.6

The 2002 Sugar Bowl, a 2001–02 BCS game, was played on January 1, 2002. This 68th edition to the Sugar Bowl featured the Illinois Fighting Illini, and the LSU Tigers. Illinois came into the game 10–1, and ranked 8th in the BCS, whereas LSU came into the game 9–3, and ranked 13th in the BCS. Sponsored by Nokia, the game was officially known as the Nokia Sugar Bowl.

== Teams ==
The Sugar Bowl during the BCS era usually selected the SEC champion, meaning that the winner of the SEC in 2001, LSU received an invitation to the Sugar Bowl. Their opponent would be Big Ten champion Illinois.

=== Illinois Fighting Illini ===
Illinois won the Big Ten title and earn a BCS berth as their conference's champion. The Big Ten's champion usually gets an invitation to the Rose Bowl, however the 2002 Rose Bowl was the designated BCS National Championship Game for 2001. This meant the Fighting Illini would get an at-large berth to another BCS bowl, which in turn was the Sugar Bowl. Illinois entered the bowl with a 10–1 record (7–1 in conference).

=== LSU Tigers ===
LSU defeated Tennessee in the 2001 SEC Championship Game to earn a berth in the Sugar Bowl as their conference's champion. LSU entered the bowl with a 9–3 record (5–3 in conference).

== Game summary ==
Domanick Davis started the scoring with a 4-yard touchdown run to open up a 7–0 LSU lead. In the second quarter, he posted touchdown runs of 25 and 16 yards, as LSU opened a 21–0 lead. Quarterback Rohan Davey found wide receiver Josh Reed in the end zone for a 28–0 lead. Quarterback Kittner threw a touchdown pass to Hodges to close the deficit to 28–7. Rohan Davey added another touchdown pass before the half to open a 34–7 half-time lead.

Illinois tried to rally but were too far behind, and LSU ended up winning 47–34. Davey and Josh Reed would play in their final game together. Davey would graduate and Reed would forgo his senior season to play in the NFL at Buffalo.

=== Scoring summary ===
Scoring summary

Quarter	Time	Drive			Team	Scoring information	Score	
Quarter	Time	Plays	Yards	TOP	Team	Scoring information	ILL	LSU
1	7:22	7	43	3:03	LSU	Domanick Davis 4-yard touchdown run, John Corbello kick good	0	7
2	13:29	3	36	1:08	LSU	Domanick Davis 25-yard touchdown run, John Corbello kick no good (blocked)	0	13
2	10:23	6	69	1:31	LSU	Domanick Davis 16-yard touchdown run, John Corbello kick good	0	20
2	4:42	3	5	0:54	LSU	Josh Reed 5-yard touchdown reception from Rohan Davey, John Corbello kick good	0	27
2	3:47	3	75	0:55	ILL	Brian Hodges 2-yard touchdown reception from Kurt Kittner, Peter Christofilakos kick good	7	27
2	0:18	10	73	3:29	LSU	Robert Royal 6-yard touchdown reception from Rohan Davey, John Corbello kick good	7	34
3	10:35	4	70	1:54	ILL	Brandon Lloyd 17-yard touchdown reception from Kurt Kittner, Peter Christofilakos kick good	14	34
3	9:29	3	67	1:06	LSU	Josh Reed 32-yard touchdown reception from Rohan Davey, John Corbello kick good	14	41
3	7:20	7	78	2:09	ILL	Brandon Lloyd 10-yard touchdown reception from Kurt Kittner, Peter Christofilakos kick good	21	41
4	11:33	6	54	1:23	ILL	Walter Young 17-yard touchdown reception from Kurt Kittner, Peter Christofilakos kick good	28	41
4	8:39	6	64	2:54	LSU	Domanick Davis 4-yard touchdown run, 2-point pass intercepted	28	47
4	5:41	1	40	0:12	ILL	Walter Young 40-yard touchdown reception from Kurt Kittner, 2-point pass incomplete	34	47
"TOP" = time of possession. For other American football terms, see Glossary of American football.							34	47

=== Statistics ===
	1	2	3	4	Total
No. 8 Fighting Illini	0	7	14	13	34
No. 13 Tigers	7	27	7	6	47

Statistics	ILL	LSU
First downs	14	32
Plays–yards	57–363	97–595
Rushes–yards	21–61	44–151
Passing yards	302	444
Passing: comp–att–int	15–36–1	31–53–0
Time of possession	20:44	39:16

Team	Category	Player	Statistics
Illinois	Passing	Kurt Kittner	14/35, 262 yds, 4 TD, 1 INT
Illinois	Rushing	Rocky Harvey	9 car, 42 yds
Illinois	Receiving	Walter Young	6 rec, 178 yds, 2 TD
LSU	Passing	Rohan Davey	33/53, 444 yds, 3 TD
LSU	Rushing	Domanick Davis	28 car, 122 yds, 4 TD
LSU	Receiving	Josh Reed	14 rec, 239 yds, 2 TD
