= Ron Turner (American football) =

American football player and coach (born 1953)

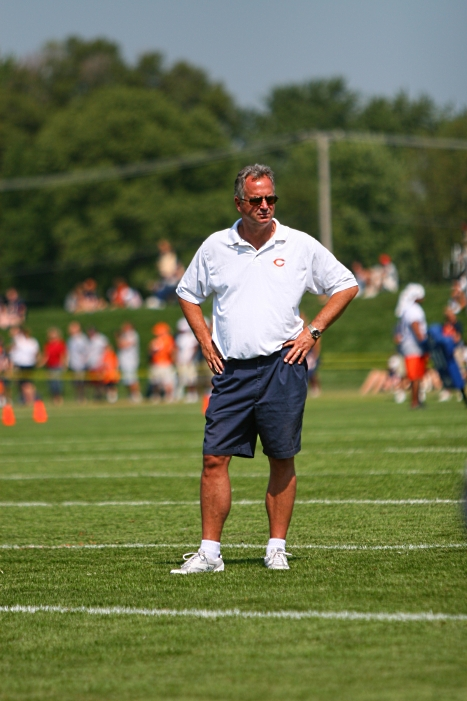
- Turner in 2007

Personal information
- Born: December 5, 1953 (age 72); Martinez, California, U.S.

Career information
- College: Pacific (CA)

Career history
- Pacific (CA) (1978) Graduate assistant; Arizona (1979–1980) Wide receivers coach; Arizona (1980) Running backs coach; Northwestern (1981–1982) Quarterbacks & wide receivers coach; Pittsburgh (1983–1984) Quarterbacks coach; USC (1985) Quarterbacks coach; USC (1986) Offensive coordinator; USC (1987) Wide receivers coach; Texas A&M (1988) Wide receivers coach; Stanford (1989–1991) Offensive coordinator & quarterbacks coach; San Jose State (1992) Head coach; Chicago Bears (1993–1996) Offensive coordinator & quarterbacks coach; Illinois (1997–2004) Head coach; Chicago Bears (2005–2009) Offensive coordinator; Indianapolis Colts (2010) Wide receivers coach; Indianapolis Colts (2011) Quarterbacks coach; Tampa Bay Buccaneers (2012) Quarterbacks coach; FIU (2013–2016) Head coach; Carolina Panthers (2017) Offensive consultant

Awards and highlights
- Big Ten (2001); Big Ten Coach of the Year (2001)

Head coaching record
- Career: NCAA: 52–91 (.364)
- Coaching profile at Pro Football Reference

Ronald David Turner (born December 5, 1953) is an American former football coach and player. He most recently served an offensive consultant with the Carolina Panthers of the National Football League (NFL) in 2017. He was the head coach at FIU from 2013 to 2016. Turner served as the head football coach at San Jose State University in 1992, and the University of Illinois Urbana–Champaign from 1997 to 2004. He also had two separate stints as the offensive coordinator for the Chicago Bears, the first from 1993 to 1996, and most recently from 2005 to 2009.

== Playing career ==
Turner played college football as a wide receiver for Diablo Valley College from 1973 to 1974, and the University of the Pacific from 1975 to 1976. He was inducted into Pacific's Athletic Hall of Fame in 2009. He earned a scholarship to the University of the Pacific, where he led the Tigers in receiving in 1975 and 1976 and totaled 40 receptions for 666 yards with three touchdowns.

== Coaching career ==
=== College coaching career ===
Turner began his coaching career as a graduate assistant at Pacific before earning his first full-time college job coaching running backs and receivers at University of Arizona (1978–1980). He moved on to be an assistant at Northwestern University (1981–1982), the University of Pittsburgh (1983–1984), the University of Southern California (1985–1987), Texas A&M University (1988), and Stanford University (1989–1991), before earning his first head coaching job at San Jose State University in 1992. Turner was the head coach at San Jose State for one season before being hired by Dave Wannstedt in the first of his two stints as the Bears offensive coordinator.

Between his two stints with the Bears, Turner spent eight years as head coach at the University of Illinois. His overall record at Illinois was 35 wins and 57 losses, for a winning percentage of .380. The highlight of his tenure came in 2001 when he guided the Illini to a 10–2 record, the Big Ten Conference title, and an appearance in the Sugar Bowl, which Illinois lost to LSU. That season, Turner was named the Big Ten Coach of the Year. His only other winning season was in 1999, when he led the Illini to the MicronPC Bowl, which the Illini won by a 63–21 scoreline—at the time the second-highest points ever scored by a team in a collegiate bowl game.

Turner followed up the successful 2001 campaign with three consecutive losing seasons and was fired. Two of his teams were winless in the Big Ten, going 0–8 in 1997 and again in 2003. Turner is the only coach in the more than 100-year history of Illinois football to lose 11 games in a season, which he also accomplished in those same two seasons. His 1997 team was only the third in school history not to win a single game, going 0–11. Turner presided over three of the top six offenses in Illini history in terms of total yards, while four of his eight Illinois squads currently rank in the school's top 11 for scoring, including the 2001 team that scored a school-record 390 points. Three of the top six all-time leading rushers at Illinois and three of the school's top ten all-time leading receivers played during the Turner era. There were over 20 former Illini who played under Turner on NFL rosters at the end of the 2007 season. One of Turner's former players at Illinois who also went on to the NFL, Josh Whitman, was named director of athletics at the university on February 26, 2016.

=== Chicago Bears ===
The Bears team completion percentages in 1994 (61.4%) and 1995 (60.2%) rank as the highest in team history. Chicago's net passing yard total of 3,743 in 1995 ranks second in team annals while the total of 3,185 in 1996 was pushed to sixth in team history by the team's totals from 2006 and 2007. With Erik Kramer at quarterback in 1995, the Bears set a team record for passing yards per game with 233.9 while compiling the fifth-most points in team history with 392. Kramer set club records with 29 touchdown passes and 10 interceptions (least among 16-game starters). The 1995 squad produced the third-most total net yards (5,673) and the second-most first downs (340) in team history. The offense also featured a 1,000-yard rusher and two 1,000-yard receivers in 1995, the only such season in team history. During his earlier four years with the Bears as offensive coordinator/quarterbacks coach under head coach Dave Wannstedt, Turner guided some of the most prolific offenses in club history.

Turner was hired for his second stint with Chicago on January 9, 2005, replacing Terry Shea as Bears offensive coordinator. Coincidentally, Turner had also replaced Shea as head coach at San Jose State in 1992. In the 2005 season, Chicago started a rookie at quarterback, Kyle Orton, who was a fourth-round draft pick and compiled a 10–5 record. Chicago featured the eighth-ranked running game in the NFL in 2005. The 2,099 rushing yards totaled by the Bears were the franchise's most in a season since 1990 when the team rushed for 2,436 yards. Chicago also tied for the NFL-lead with 19 runs of 20 or more yards in 2005 after recording just seven such rushing gains in 2004. On the season, the Bears rushed for over 100 yards in 13 of 16 regular season games featuring six individual 100-yard rushing performances.

Turner contributed to Chicago's appearance in Super Bowl XLI by coordinating an offense that ranked 15th in the NFL in total yards in 2006. He has coordinated the team's offense in each of its last six playoff games with Chicago owning a 3–3 record in those contests while averaging 25.7 points per game. Turner also holds the distinction of being the offensive coordinator for each of the top two quarterbacks in Bears history in single-season gross passing yardage. Erik Kramer set the franchise record with 3,838 passing yards under Turner in 1995 while Rex Grossman finished 2006 as the runner-up in that category with 3,193 yards. The Bears were the only NFL team with six players with five or more touchdowns in 2006. Chicago's 38 offensive touchdowns (24 passing, 14 rushing) in 2006 were the unit's highest single-season total since scoring 44 in 1995. In 2006, the Bears led the NFC while tying for second in the NFL with 427 points, the second-highest single-season scoring total in franchise history.

Chicago topped the 30-point plateau twice in 2008, four times in 2007 and accomplished the feat seven times during the 2006 season, the team's most 30-point games in one campaign since registering eight in 1956. The Bears scored 48 points against the Vikings on October 19, 2008, the most for the club since tallying 48 on December 7, 1986, versus Tampa Bay. The offense has compiled more than 300 total net yards in 25 of their last 48 games after doing so just three times in 2005; the third season of Turner's first stint with the team. The last time Chicago had six players combine for at least five touchdowns was 1948.

In 2008, the Bears passing offense continued to develop under Turner. Bears quarterbacks threw for over 3,000 net passing yards for the third straight season, a first for the franchise since the 1997–99 campaigns. Chicago has passed for over 3,000 net yards in six of the previous eight seasons under Turner's direction. In 2008, Turner helped oversee the development of rookie running back Matt Forte. Forte set Bears rookie records for rushing yards (1,238), yards from scrimmage (1,715) and receptions (63). The passing game was led by quarterback Kyle Orton in 2008. In 2008, Orton recorded the sixth-most passing yards in team history (2,972), fourth-most completions (272), the fifth-highest completion percentage (58.5) and 13th-highest passer rating (79.6) in 15 starts. Orton's nine starts without an interception in 2008 were tied for fourth-most in the NFL and most by a Bears quarterback since 1995. Orton also threw a team-record 205 consecutive pass attempts without an interception last season. Chicago scored 375 total points in 2008, tied for seventh-most in franchise history. In 2009, Bears acquired Pro Bowl quarterback Jay Cutler. After throwing 19 TD passes and 25 interceptions in the first 14 games, Cutler passed for eight TDs and one pick in season's last two games against the Vikings and Lions, giving him more TDs (27) than interceptions (26) this season. The Bears offense generated season-highs vs. Detroit with 418 total yards and 22 first downs, giving the unit 718 yards and 41 first downs in its final two games. On January 5, 2010, he and several of his assistants were fired. The Bears qualified for the postseason in three of Turner's eight seasons with the team.

=== Indianapolis Colts ===
After being fired by the Chicago Bears after the Bears poor 2009 season, Turner was hired as offensive coordinator by Stanford. However, four weeks later he became wide receivers coach for the Indianapolis Colts.

=== FIU ===
On January 3, 2013, Turner was hired as the head coach of FIU, becoming the young program's third coach and taking the reins as the program entered Conference USA. He led the team to a 1–11 record and a seventh-place finish in Conference USA's East Division. In his second season, Turner led the team to a 4–8 record.

On September 25, 2016, Turner was relieved of his duties as head coach.

== Personal life ==
Turner is the brother of Norv Turner, former head coach of the San Diego Chargers. Ron and his wife, Wendy, have two sons, Morgan and Cameron, and two daughters, Cally and Madison. Cam played quarterback for The Citadel before becoming a coach. He has also coached. Morgan served as the tight ends coach for the Arkansas Razorbacks.

== Head coaching record ==
Year	Team	Overall	Conference	Standing	Bowl/playoffs	Coaches^{#}	AP^{°}
San Jose State Spartans (Big West Conference) (1992)
1992	San Jose State	7–4	4–2	T–2nd			
San Jose State:		7–4	4–2				
Illinois Fighting Illini (Big Ten Conference) (1997–2004)
1997	Illinois	0–11	0–8	11			
1998	Illinois	3–8	2–6	T–7th			
1999	Illinois	8–4	4–4	T–6th	W MicronPC	25	24
2000	Illinois	5–6	2–6	T–9th			
2001	Illinois	10–2	7–1	1st	L Sugar^{†}	12	12
2002	Illinois	5–7	4–4	T–5th			
2003	Illinois	1–11	0–8	11th			
2004	Illinois	3–8	1–7	T–10th			
Illinois:		35–57	20–44				
FIU Panthers (Conference USA) (2013–present)
2013	FIU	1–11	1–7	T–5th (East)			
2014	FIU	4–8	3–5	6th (East)			
2015	FIU	5–7	3–5	T–4th (East)			
2016	FIU	0–4	0–0	(East)			
FIU:		10–30	7–17				
Total:		52–91					
National championship Conference title Conference division title or championship game berth
^{†}Indicates BCS bowl.; ^{#}Rankings from final Coaches Poll.; ^{°}Rankings from final AP Poll.
