= 2001 Kentucky Wildcats football team =

American college football season

2001 Kentucky Wildcats football
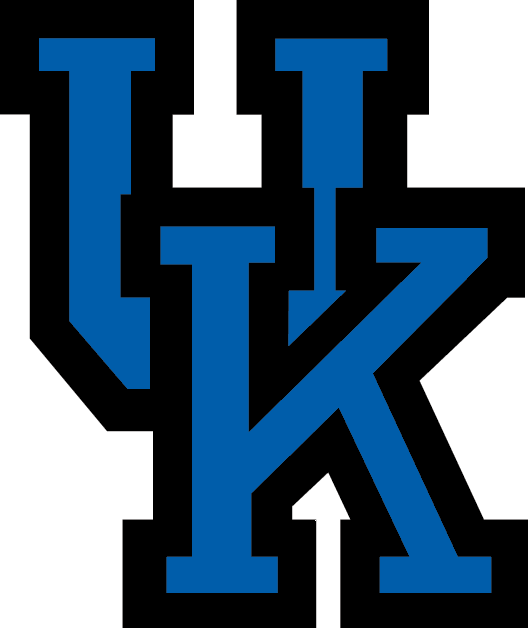
- Conference: Southeastern Conference
- Eastern Division
- Record: 2–9 (1–7 SEC)
- Head coach: Guy Morriss (1st season)
- Offensive coordinator: Brent Pease (1st season)
- Offensive scheme: Pro set
- Defensive coordinator: John Goodner (1st season)
- Base defense: 4–2–5, 4–4–3
- Home stadium: Commonwealth Stadium

2001 Southeastern Conference football standings
	Conf.			Overall
Team	W		L	W		L
Eastern Division
No. 4 Tennessee x	7	–	1	11	–	2
No. 3 Florida %	6	–	2	10	–	2
No. 13 South Carolina	5	–	3	9	–	3
No. 22 Georgia	5	–	3	8	–	4
Kentucky	1	–	7	2	–	9
Vanderbilt	0	–	8	2	–	9
Western Division
No. 7 LSU xy$	5	–	3	10	–	3
Auburn x	5	–	3	7	–	5
Ole Miss	4	–	4	7	–	4
Alabama	4	–	4	7	–	5
Arkansas	4	–	4	7	–	5
Mississippi State	2	–	6	3	–	8
Championship: LSU 31, Tennessee 20
$ – BCS representative as conference champion; % – BCS at-large representative; x – Division champion/co-champions; y – Championship game participant; Rankings from AP Poll

The 2001 Kentucky Wildcats football team represented the University of Kentucky as a member of the Eastern Division of the Southeastern Conference (SEC) during the 2001 NCAA Division I-A football season. Led by first-year head coach Guy Morriss, the Wildcats compiled an overall record of 2–9 with a mark of 1–7 in conference play, placing fifth in the SEC's Eastern Division. The team played home games at Commonwealth Stadium in Lexington, Kentucky.

== Schedule ==
Date	Time	Opponent	Site	TV	Result	Attendance
September 1	12:30 pm	Louisville*	Commonwealth Stadium; Lexington, KY (Governor's Cup)	JPS	L 10–36	70,838
September 8	1:30 pm	Ball State*	Commonwealth Stadium; Lexington, KY		W 28–20	61,523
September 22	12:30 pm	No. 2 Florida	Commonwealth Stadium; Lexington, KY (rivalry)	JPS	L 10–44	66,126
September 29	1:30 pm	Ole Miss	Commonwealth Stadium; Lexington, KY	PPV	L 31–42	60,814
October 6	1:00 pm	at No. 13 South Carolina	Williams–Brice Stadium; Columbia, SC	PPV	L 6–42	80,250
October 13	7:00 pm	LSU	Commonwealth Stadium; Lexington, KY	PPV	L 25–29	52,471
October 20	12:30 pm	at No. 17 Georgia	Sanford Stadium; Athens, GA	JPS	L 29–43	86,520
November 3	2:30 pm	at Mississippi State	Davis Wade Stadium; Starkville, MS		L 14–17	41,433
November 10	2:00 pm	at Vanderbilt	Vanderbilt Stadium; Nashville, TN (rivalry)		W 56–30	32,422
November 17	12:30 pm	No. 6 Tennessee	Commonwealth Stadium; Lexington, KY (rivalry)	JPS	L 35–38	69,109
December 1	1:00 pm	at Indiana*	Memorial Stadium; Bloomington, Indiana (rivalry)		L 15–26	26,449
*Non-conference game; Rankings from AP Poll released prior to the game; All times are in Eastern time

== Roster ==
2001 Kentucky Wildcats football team roster
Players
Coaches
Offense

Pos.	#	Name	Class
[[American football positions|]]
[[American football positions|]]

Defense

Pos.	#	Name	Class
[[American football positions|]]

Special teams

Pos.	#	Name	Class

}}

Head coach

- [[]]

Coordinators/assistant coaches

Legend

- (C) Team captain
- (S) Suspended
- (I) Ineligible
- Injured
- Redshirt

== Game summaries ==
=== Louisville ===
	1	2	3	4	Total
Cardinals	7	3	6	20	36
Wildcats	7	0	3	0	10

Statistics	LOU	UK
First downs	24	18
Total yards	486	213
Rushing yards	118	58
Passing yards	368	155
Passing: comp–att–int	21–34–0	15–37–2
Turnovers	1	4

Team	Category	Player	Statistics
Louisville	Passing	Dave Ragone	21/34, 368 yards, 3 TD
Louisville	Rushing	T. J. Patterson	17 rushes, 72 yards, 2 TD
Louisville	Receiving	Zek Parker	6 receptions, 184 yards, TD
Kentucky	Passing	Jared Lorenzen	12/31, 121 yards, INT
Kentucky	Rushing	Chad Scott	11 rushes, 29 yards
Kentucky	Receiving	Dougie Allen	3 receptions, 47 yards

=== Ball State ===
	1	2	3	4	Total
Cardinals	3	7	3	7	20
Wildcats	0	14	7	7	28

Statistics	BALL	UK
First downs	27	17
Total yards	427	361
Rushing yards	257	146
Passing yards	170	215
Passing: comp–att–int	19–35–0	15–22–0
Turnovers	0	1

Team	Category	Player	Statistics
Ball State	Passing	Talmadge Hill	19/35, 170 yards, 2 TD
Ball State	Rushing	Marcus Merriweather	21 rushes, 121 yards
Ball State	Receiving	Billy Lynch	8 receptions, 60 yards, TD
Kentucky	Passing	Shane Boyd	15/22, 215 yards, 2 TD
Kentucky	Rushing	Chad Scott	10 rushes, 119 yards, TD
Kentucky	Receiving	Derek Abney	5 receptions, 84 yards, TD

=== No. 2 Florida ===
	1	2	3	4	Total
No. 2 Gators	7	9	14	14	44
Wildcats	0	3	7	0	10

Statistics	FLA	UK
First downs	25	11
Total yards	565	288
Rushing yards	168	85
Passing yards	397	203
Passing: comp–att–int	25–40–0	23–39–0
Turnovers	3	0

Team	Category	Player	Statistics
Florida	Passing	Rex Grossman	22/36, 302 yards, 4 TD
Florida	Rushing	Earnest Graham	11 rushes, 86 yards, TD
Florida	Receiving	Reche Caldwell	5 receptions, 105 yards, TD
Kentucky	Passing	Shane Boyd	23/39, 203 yards, TD
Kentucky	Rushing	Martez Johnson	9 rushes, 49 yards
Kentucky	Receiving	Ernie Simms	6 receptions, 75 yards

=== Ole Miss ===
	1	2	3	4	Total
Rebels	7	14	14	7	42
Wildcats	7	7	7	10	31

Statistics	MISS	UK
First downs	26	18
Total yards	497	329
Rushing yards	229	225
Passing yards	268	104
Passing: comp–att–int	19–36–0	12–33–1
Turnovers	1	1

Team	Category	Player	Statistics
Ole Miss	Passing	Eli Manning	19/36, 268 yards, 2 TD
Ole Miss	Rushing	Joe Gunn	13 rushes, 113 yards
Ole Miss	Receiving	Chris Collins	7 receptions, 119 yards, TD
Kentucky	Passing	Shane Boyd	7/20, 72 yards, INT
Kentucky	Rushing	Artose Pinner	17 rushes, 130 yards, 2 TD
Kentucky	Receiving	Chase Harp	3 receptions, 41 yards

=== At South Carolina ===
	1	2	3	4	Total
Wildcats	0	0	0	6	6
Gamecocks	21	7	0	14	42

Statistics	UK	SCAR
First downs	16	21
Total yards	326	402
Rushing yards	138	237
Passing yards	188	165
Passing: comp–att–int	20–36–2	12–19–0
Turnovers	4	0

Team	Category	Player	Statistics
Kentucky	Passing	Shane Boyd	20/36, 188 yards, TD, 2 INT
Kentucky	Rushing	Artose Pinner	19 rushes, 105 yards
Kentucky	Receiving	Brad Pyatt	4 receptions, 46 yards
South Carolina	Passing	Phil Petty	10/16, 112 yards, 2 TD
South Carolina	Rushing	Derek Watson	16 rushes, 135 yards
South Carolina	Receiving	Willis Ham	1 reception, 44 yards

=== LSU ===
	1	2	3	4	Total
Tigers	12	10	0	7	29
Wildcats	0	10	7	8	25

Statistics	LSU	UK
First downs	22	20
Total yards	515	413
Rushing yards	132	127
Passing yards	383	286
Passing: comp–att–int	27–38–2	23–42–2
Turnovers	2	2

Team	Category	Player	Statistics
LSU	Passing	Rohan Davey	27/38, 383 yards, 2 TD, 2 INT
LSU	Rushing	LaBrandon Toefield	28 rushes, 129 yards, TD
LSU	Receiving	Josh Reed	8 receptions, 160 yards
Kentucky	Passing	Jared Lorenzen	6/11, 146 yards, 2 TD
Kentucky	Rushing	Artose Pinner	11 rushes, 49 yards
Kentucky	Receiving	Derek Abney	5 receptions, 65 yards, TD

=== At No. 17 Georgia ===
	1	2	3	4	Total
Wildcats	3	19	7	0	29
No. 17 Bulldogs	7	7	15	14	43

Statistics	UK	UGA
First downs	30	30
Total yards	493	591
Rushing yards	116	197
Passing yards	377	394
Passing: comp–att–int	32–54–2	23–37–1
Turnovers	3	2

Team	Category	Player	Statistics
Kentucky	Passing	Jared Lorenzen	32/54, 377 yards, 3 TD, 2 INT
Kentucky	Rushing	Jared Lorenzen	8 rushes, 61 yards, TD
Kentucky	Receiving	Aaron Boone	5 receptions, 94 yards, 2 TD
Georgia	Passing	David Greene	22/36, 364 yards, 3 TD, INT
Georgia	Rushing	Verron Haynes	14 rushes, 86 yards, 2 TD
Georgia	Receiving	Fred Gibson	9 receptions, 201 yards, 2 TD

=== At Mississippi State ===
	1	2	3	4	Total
Wildcats	0	7	7	0	14
Bulldogs	0	0	7	10	17

Statistics	UK	MSST
First downs	18	19
Total yards	322	428
Rushing yards	2	221
Passing yards	320	207
Passing: comp–att–int	26–46–2	17–32–1
Turnovers	2	1

Team	Category	Player	Statistics
Kentucky	Passing	Jared Lorenzen	26/46, 320 yards, 2 TD, 2 INT
Kentucky	Rushing	Martez Johnson	6 rushes, 16 yards
Kentucky	Receiving	Derek Abney	12 receptions, 123 yards
Mississippi State	Passing	Kevin Fant	6/10, 120 yards, TD
Mississippi State	Rushing	Dicenzo Miller	26 rushes, 131 yards
Mississippi State	Receiving	Justin Jenkins	3 receptions, 87 yards, TD

=== At Vanderbilt ===
	1	2	3	4	Total
Wildcats	13	17	13	13	56
Commodores	6	7	17	0	30

Statistics	UK	VAN
First downs	26	34
Total yards	583	542
Rushing yards	130	102
Passing yards	453	440
Passing: comp–att–int	26–37–0	30–48–1
Turnovers	1	3

Team	Category	Player	Statistics
Kentucky	Passing	Jared Lorenzen	26/37, 453 yards, 6 TD
Kentucky	Rushing	Martez Johnson	6 rushes, 33 yards, TD
Kentucky	Receiving	Derek Smith	4 receptions, 130 yards, 2 TD
Vanderbilt	Passing	Greg Zolman	29/45, 441 yards, 2 TD, INT
Vanderbilt	Rushing	Rodney Williams	18 rushes, 76 yards, TD
Vanderbilt	Receiving	Dan Stricker	12 receptions, 204 yards, 2 TD

=== No. 6 Tennessee ===
	1	2	3	4	Total
No. 6 Volunteers	0	7	14	17	38
Wildcats	7	14	7	7	35

Statistics	TENN	UK
First downs	15	24
Total yards	367	543
Rushing yards	82	137
Passing yards	285	406
Passing: comp–att–int	20–30–0	34–53–1
Turnovers	0	2

Team	Category	Player	Statistics
Tennessee	Passing	Casey Clausen	20/30, 285 yards, 4 TD
Tennessee	Rushing	Travis Stephens	18 rushes, 79 yards
Tennessee	Receiving	Donté Stallworth	9 receptions, 169 yards, 3 TD
Kentucky	Passing	Jared Lorenzen	34/53, 406 yards, 4 TD, INT
Kentucky	Rushing	Jared Lorenzen	13 rushes, 52 yards, TD
Kentucky	Receiving	Derek Abney	10 receptions, 118 yards, TD

=== At Indiana ===
	1	2	3	4	Total
Wildcats	7	0	0	8	15
Hoosiers	7	12	0	7	26

Statistics	UK	IU
First downs	18	26
Total yards	340	409
Rushing yards	16	215
Passing yards	324	194
Passing: comp–att–int	26–47–1	15–31–0
Turnovers	1	0

Team	Category	Player	Statistics
Kentucky	Passing	Jared Lorenzen	26/47, 324 yards, 2 TD, INT
Kentucky	Rushing	Chad Scott	2 rushes, 34 yards
Kentucky	Receiving	Tommy Cook	7 receptions, 115 yards
Indiana	Passing	Antwaan Randle El	15/31, 194 yards, 2 TD
Indiana	Rushing	Jeremi Johnson	17 rushes, 97 yards, 2 TD
Indiana	Receiving	Kris Dielman	4 receptions, 62 yards, TD
