= 2001 Arkansas Razorbacks football team =

American college football season

2001 Arkansas Razorbacks football

Cotton Bowl Classic, L 3–10 vs. Oklahoma
- Conference: Southeastern Conference
- Western Division
- Record: 7–5 (4–4 SEC)
- Head coach: Houston Nutt (4th season)
- Offensive scheme: I formation
- Defensive coordinator: John Thompson (2nd season)
- Base defense: Multiple
- Captains: Curt Davis; Carlos Hall; Kenny Sandlin; La'Zerius White
- Home stadium: Razorback Stadium; War Memorial Stadium

2001 Southeastern Conference football standings
	Conf.			Overall
Team	W		L	W		L
Eastern Division
No. 4 Tennessee x	7	–	1	11	–	2
No. 3 Florida %	6	–	2	10	–	2
No. 13 South Carolina	5	–	3	9	–	3
No. 22 Georgia	5	–	3	8	–	4
Kentucky	1	–	7	2	–	9
Vanderbilt	0	–	8	2	–	9
Western Division
No. 7 LSU xy$	5	–	3	10	–	3
Auburn x	5	–	3	7	–	5
Ole Miss	4	–	4	7	–	4
Alabama	4	–	4	7	–	5
Arkansas	4	–	4	7	–	5
Mississippi State	2	–	6	3	–	8
Championship: LSU 31, Tennessee 20
$ – BCS representative as conference champion; % – BCS at-large representative; x – Division champion/co-champions; y – Championship game participant; Rankings from AP Poll

The 2001 Arkansas Razorbacks football team represented the University of Arkansas as a member of the Southeastern Conference (SEC) during the 2001 NCAA Division I-A football season. Led by fourth-year head coach Houston Nutt, the Razorbacks compiled an overall record 7–5 with a mark of 4–4 in conference play, placing in a three-way tie for third in the SEC's Western Division. Arkansas was invited to the Cotton Bowl Classic, where the Razorbacks lost to Oklahoma. The team played home games at Razorback Stadium in Fayetteville, Arkansas and War Memorial Stadium in Little Rock, Arkansas.

== Schedule ==
Date	Time	Opponent	Rank	Site	TV	Result	Attendance	Source
August 30	6:30 pm	UNLV*		War Memorial Stadium; Little Rock, AR	ESPN	W 14–10	52,213	
September 8	8:00 pm	No. 8 Tennessee		Donald W. Reynolds Razorback Stadium; Fayetteville, AR	ESPN2	L 3–13	70,470	
September 22	2:30 pm	at Alabama		Bryant–Denny Stadium; Tuscaloosa, AL	CBS	L 10–31	83,818	
September 29	5:30 pm	at Georgia		Sanford Stadium; Athens, GA	ESPN2	L 23–34	86,520	
October 6	6:00 pm	Weber State*^{†}		Donald W. Reynolds Razorback Stadium; Fayetteville, AR		W 42–19	52,683	
October 13	2:30 pm	No. 9 South Carolina		War Memorial Stadium; Little Rock, AR	CBS	W 10–7	53,514	
October 27	11:30 am	No. 17 Auburn		Donald W. Reynolds Razorback Stadium; Fayetteville, AR	JPS	W 42–17	67,213	
November 3	6:00 pm	at Ole Miss		Vaught–Hemingway Stadium; Oxford, MS (rivalry)	ESPN2	W 58–56 ^{7OT}	47,464	
November 10	1:00 pm	UCF*		Donald W. Reynolds Razorback Stadium; Fayetteville, AR		W 27–20	61,527	
November 17	1:00 pm	Mississippi State		Donald W. Reynolds Razorback Stadium; Fayetteville, AR		W 24–21	67,314	
November 23	1:30 pm	at LSU	No. 24	Tiger Stadium; Baton Rouge, LA (rivalry)	CBS	L 38–41	89,560	
January 1	10:00 am	vs. No. 10 Oklahoma*		Cotton Bowl; Dallas, TX (Cotton Bowl Classic)	FOX	L 3–10	72,955	
*Non-conference game; ^{†}Homecoming; Rankings from AP Poll released prior to the game; All times are in Central time

== Game summaries ==
=== UNLV ===
	1	2	3	4	Total
Rebels	3	7	0	0	10
Razorbacks	0	0	7	7	14

With 18 seconds to play, the Razorbacks grabbed their first win of the year from the UNLV Rebels. Running back Cedric Cobbs ran in from one yard away to give the Hogs a 14–10 win. Arkansas had only 114 total yards, 49 of those coming on the final scoring drive, as Cobbs had 29 yards on 13 carries. Four Razorback QBs played. Lawrence Richardson returned an interception for a touchdown for the other Razorback touchdown.

=== Tennessee ===
	1	2	3	4	Total
#8 Volunteers	0	0	0	13	13
Razorbacks	3	0	0	0	3

In a game delayed twice due to lightning, in front of a record crowd in the newly expanded Donald W. Reynolds Razorback Stadium, the Razorbacks had a 3–0 lead until the fourth quarter, when Tennessee roared back for 13 points and the win. Cedric Cobbs broke the thousand yard milestone with a forty-yard dash, setting up the only Razorback points of the contest, a 24-yard Brennan O'Donohoe field goal. The Hogs would gain −3 yards offensively from that point, and Tennessee would not score until a 33-yard field goal with 9:44 to play. An Arkansas punt and seven Volunteer plays later produced another field goal, giving Tennessee a 6–3 lead. Travis Stephens of Tennessee would later spin in from three yards out, producing the first and final touchdown in the final minute. Freshman Stevens would have 206 yards, leading #8 Tennessee to a win.

=== Alabama ===
	1	2	3	4	Total
Razorbacks	3	7	0	0	10
Crimson Tide	7	7	10	7	31

Alabama scored 21 points from three Arkansas miscues, and defeated the Razorbacks 31–10. A 42-yard fumble recovery for a touchdown by Tide defender Reggie Myles, coupled with a Thurman Ward interception returned for a 60-yard touchdown gave the Tide a win despite being outgained (315–249) and losing the time-of-possession battle (35:28–24:32).

Ryan Sorahan, who had to leave the game due to a back injury, was 14 of 19 for 139 yards. Zak Clark and later Tarvaris Jackson (who would later transfer to Alabama A&M and later play for the Minnesota Vikings) would spell him.

=== Georgia ===
	1	2	3	4	Total
Razorbacks	10	3	7	3	23
Bulldogs	10	10	7	7	34

Georgia QB David Greene finished two yards short of 300 and RB Musa Smith finished five yards shy of 100 as Georgia handed Arkansas its third straight SEC loss. Back-up Hog QB Zak Clark started the game between the Hedges for the injured Sorahan, and RB Brandon Holmes left the game after spraining his left shoulder.

The Bulldogs opened the scoring with a 2-yard Verron Hayes run, countered by the Hogs with a Holmes TD run. The SEC foes then swapped field goals, before Greene hooked up with Terrence Edwards for a seven-yard TD strike. After another field goal by each squad, Georgia took a 20–13 halftime lead. In the third quarter, Razorback Marvin Jackson returned a punt 74 yards for a touchdown, the first since 1992, but Georgia's Musa Smith responded by diving two yards for a score. After a third Razorback field goal by O'Donohoe, the Dogs put the game away with a four TD pass from Greene.

=== Weber State ===
	1	2	3	4	Total
Wildcats	0	0	7	12	19
Razorbacks	14	7	14	7	42

Lawrence Richardson returned the game's opening kickoff 98 yards for a touchdown, and the Hogs never looked back in their 42–19 win against the Wildcats of Weber State. Razorback running back Brandon Holmes added another score from one yard out to make it a 14–0 Hog lead. In the second quarter, George Wilson hauled in a 33-yard strike to push the lead to 21–0. To open the second half scoring, Hog RB Fred Talley sprinted 35 yards to the end zone, and after a Weber State score, Razorback Decori Birmingham added a ten-yard touchdown scamper, making the score 35–7. The Wildcats connected on a 17-yard TD pass, but missed the extra point, making it a 35–13 Arkansas lead. Matt Jones then electrified the homecoming crowd with a 59-yard touchdown run to cap the Arkansas scoring at 42–13. Weber State would add another score with less than a minute remaining, but Arkansas would take a 42–19 final.

=== South Carolina ===
	1	2	3	4	Total
#9 Gamecocks	0	0	7	0	7
Razorbacks	3	0	7	0	10

Arkansas upset the ninth-ranked Gamecocks in Little Rock, giving the Hogs their first SEC win. Carlos Hall blocked a game-tying field goal attempt with less than a minute to play to preserve the victory.

Neither team penetrated the endzone in the first half, with the only scoring being a first quarter Brennan O'Donohoe field goal for the Razorbacks. Coming out of halftime, the Gamecocks used a reverse on a kick return to start their lone scoring drive. Back-up QB Corey Jenkins would finish the drive with a 41-yard scramble into the endzone. Arkansas responded on the next possession with a Zak Clark to Richard Smith 10-yard TD pass, giving the Razorbacks a 10–7 lead. With 6:23 left to play, the Gamecocks drove and set up a game-tying field goal. South Carolina Kicker Daniel Weaver kicked the ball, and Razorback Carlos Hall leapt and deflected the kick with both hands, giving the Gamecocks their first loss and the Hogs the 10–7 win.

With the win, the Razorbacks moved to 11–0 in Little Rock under Nutt.

=== Auburn ===
	1	2	3	4	Total
#17 Tigers	3	7	7	0	17
Razorbacks	7	14	0	21	42

Freshman Matt Jones scored two touchdowns, including a passing TD on his first collegiate pass, as Arkansas defeated Auburn 42–17. Arkansas took advantage of Auburn miscues, including eleven penalties and three turnovers. Tony Bua intercepted a pass with thirty seconds before halftime, which resulted in a 16-yard touchdown pass as the half came to a close. Jermaine Petty capped the Arkansas scoring with an 88-yard interception returned for a touchdown.

=== Ole Miss ===
	1	2	3	4	OT	2OT	3OT	4OT	5OT	6OT	7OT	Total
Razorbacks	0	7	3	7	7	0	6	6	6	8	8	58
Rebels	7	0	3	7	7	0	6	6	6	8	6	56

The marathon game featured 114 points, 988 offensive yards, four 100-yard rushers, and seven overtimes, with Arkansas prevailing 58–56. The game started slowly, however, with a 7–7 tie going into halftime. Arkansas completed a field goal attempt in the third quarter, giving the Hogs a 10–7 edge. A tying 32-yard field goal attempt was then set up by Eli Manning. Razorback fullback Mark Pierce ran in from one yard away to take a 17–10 Arkansas lead in the fourth quarter, but Eli Manning connected with Jamie Armstead to send the game into overtime.

Razorback RB Cedric Cobbs scored from 16 yards out to start the overtime scoring. Eli Manning responded with an 11-yard touchdown pass, sending the game to a second overtime, in which neither team would score. Matt Jones scrambled all 25 yards for the go-ahead touchdown, but the two point run failed. Ole Miss drove to the one-yard line, where Joe Gunn ran in. Given a chance to end the game by completing the two-point conversion, Eli Manning threw the ball, but it was incomplete, sending the game to its fourth extra frame. Rebel receiver Bill Flowers hauled in a 21-yard pass from Manning to take the lead, 30–24. After the Rebels failed the two point pass, Jones threw a 24-yard TD pass to George Wilson. The Hogs would fail the two point run, extending the game to a fifth overtime. Jones again scored for the Razorbacks, an 8-yard rush, but failed the two-point conversion. Manning hit his tight end Doug Zeigler from twelve yards out, and failed the two point pass. In the sixth overtime, Zeigler again caught a Manning aerial, and Ole Miss connected on the two-point conversion with a Charles Stackhouse rush, taking a 50–42 lead. Razorback Pierce ran in from two yards out, and Arkansas completed the tying two-point conversion on a Jones pass. The game would go to a seventh overtime.

Mark Pierce again ran in for a two-yard touchdown (his third two-yard score of the game), and Decori Birmingham would receive the two point pass from Jones, making it a 58–50 Hog lead. Manning would throw his sixth touchdown pass, but the two point pass to Doug Ziegler was stopped by Jermaine Petty, giving Arkansas a 58–56 win over rival Ole Miss.

The two teams combined for 60 first downs, 130 rushing attempts (80 from the Razorbacks), 68 pass attempts, and 198 total offensive plays, while limiting mistakes, including two fumbles, eight penalties, and one sack.

The win moved Arkansas to 5–3 on the year and 3–0 in overtime. Arkansas would play another seven-overtime game, in 2003.

=== UCF ===
	1	2	3	4	Total
Golden Knights	7	3	0	10	20
Razorbacks	3	7	14	3	27

Arkansas RB Fred Talley ran for 198 yards, including an 81-yard touchdown, as Arkansas fought off a late rally to beat UCF, 27–20. The Knights scored on a 52-yard pass with three minutes to play, but fell short on their final drive. Arkansas QB Zak Clark completed nine of fourteen passes, and Arkansas improved to 6–3 on the year.

=== Mississippi State ===
	1	2	3	4	Total
Bulldogs	0	7	0	14	21
Razorbacks	7	0	10	7	24

Arkansas' Cedric Cobbs ran in from fifteen yards out with 47 seconds on the clock to beat the Bulldogs of Mississippi State, 24–21. Cobbs scored three total TD's, Jones rushed for 131 yards, and Arkansas moved to 4–3 in conference play and 7–3 overall.

Cobbs started off the scoring with a 5-yard rushing TD in the first quarter, giving Arkansas an early 7–0 lead. Josh Morgan of Mississippi State scooped up a fumble and scored in the second quarter, tying the game at 7–7. In the third quarter Hog kicker Brennan O'Donohoe kicked a 19-yard field goal, followed by a Cobbs TD run, producing a 17–7 Razorback edge. Bulldog QB Kevin Fant completed a 21-yard pass, followed three minutes later by a 25-yard TD run from the Bulldogs, giving them a 21–17 lead. Cobbs would run in for the go-ahead score, but Mississippi State drove to the Arkansas 48 before Fant was intercepted, sealing the Razorback win.

=== LSU ===
	1	2	3	4	Total
#24 Razorbacks	10	9	6	13	38
Tigers	7	13	7	14	41

LSU held off an Arkansas rally to end the Hogs six game win streak. LSU Running back LaBrandon Toefield ran for 173 yards and three touchdowns, with quarterback Rohan Davey throwing for 359 yards, three touchdowns, and four interceptions.

LSU started things off in Baton Rouge with a 62-yard LaBrandon Toefield touchdown run. Arkansas responded with a Matt Jones three-yard touchdown scamper and two field goals. Toefield struck again, this time from nine yards out. Matt Jones hooked up with Richard Smith for a Razorback touchdown, giving a 19–14 Hog lead. Tiger Rohan Davey completed a 20-yard pass to close out the first half scoring, giving the Tigers a 20–19 lead at half. Davey hit Michael Clayton for a 60-yard touchdown, but the Hogs responded with a 61-yard Matt Jones TD pass to Sparky Hamilton. Davey and Toefield would add another score each. Arkansas, down 41–25, began to rally. Hog QB Zak Clark threw two touchdown passes, but the Hogs fell three points short, 41–38.

=== Oklahoma—Cotton Bowl Classic ===
	1	2	3	4	Total
Razorbacks	0	0	0	3	3
#10 Sooners	7	0	3	0	10

The Razorbacks earned a berth in the Cotton Bowl Classic after a 7–4 regular season. They were slated to play the #10 Oklahoma Sooners, who had recently lost their National Championship hopes after a loss to Oklahoma State in Bedlam. Arkansas QBs were sacked nine times by Oklahoma, setting a school record and tying a Cotton Bowl Classic record. Arkansas could manage only 50 yards of total offense, and one Brennan O'Donohoe field goal. Oklahoma QB Nate Hybl ran in from one yard out for the only touchdown of the game. Sooner Rocky Calmus, the Butkus Award winner and Nagurski, Bednarik, and Lombardi finalist had nine tackles and a fumble recovery in the effort. Razorback coach Houston Nutt said, "[The Oklahoma defense is] the best I've seen in 15 years."

== Personnel ==
=== Coaching staff ===
2001 Arkansas Razorbacks coaching staff
Head coach: Head coach – Houston Nutt; Offensive coaches: Quarterbacks – David Lee; Running backs – Danny Nutt; Receivers – George Pugh; Tight ends – James Shibest; Offensive line – Mike Markuson; Defensive coaches: Defensive coordinator – John Thompson; Middle and strong side linebackers – John Thompson; Outside linebackers/strong safeties – Chris Vaughn; Defensive line – Bobby Allen; Secondary – Dave Wommack; Administrative staff: Athletic director (AD) – Frank Broyles; Director of football operations – Louis Campbell; Strength and conditioning – Don Decker; Recruiting coordinator – George Pugh; Graduate assistant – Steve Janski

=== Roster ===
Flankers: 5 Gerald Howard – Junior; 8 Richard Smith – Sophomore; 37 Steadman Campbell – Junior; -- Zack Blake – Sophomore; -- Caleb Ceaser – Freshman; -- Marvin Jackson – Junior; -- Warren Lloyd – Freshman; Centers: 57 Kenny Sandlin – Senior; 58 Josh Melton – Junior; 65 Dan Doughty – Sophomore; 72 Caleb Perry – Sophomore; -- Jarod Morrison – Sophomore; Guards: 60 Scott Davenport – Sophomore; 66 La'Zerius White – Senior; 71 Mark Bokermann – Sophomore; 74 Jim Peters – Sophomore; 77 Jason Reynolds – Sophomore; Offensive tackles: 50 Jerry Reith – Sophomore; 61 Shannon Money – Senior; 75 Bo Lacy – Sophomore; -- Shawn Andrews – Freshman; -- Jared Hicks – Freshman; -- Daniel Holtz – Freshman; -- Kyle Roper – Freshman; Tight ends: 82 Nathan Ball – Junior; 87 J. Strain – Freshman; 89 James Toussaint – Freshman; 95 Marcellus Poydras – Junior; -- Joey Moseley – Freshman; -- Darren Rogers – Freshman; Fullbacks: 46 Sacha Lancaster – Senior; -- Laurence Coker – Sophomore; -- Mark Luther – Sophomore; -- Laurence Coker – Sophomore; -- Bret Mitchell – Freshman; -- Mark Pierce – Freshman; -- Michael Reuber – Freshman; Running backs: 4 Cedric Cobbs – Sophomore; 7 Brandon Holmes – Sophomore; 23 Radale Pearson – Sophomore; 20 Fred Talley – Junior; -- Kyle Dickerson – Freshman; -- De'Arrius Howard – Freshman; -- Kweku Hayfron – Junior	Quarterbacks: 9 Matt Jones – Freshman; 11 Robby Hampton – Junior; 17 Zak Clark – Sophomore; -- Tarvaris Jackson – Freshman; -- Dowell Loggains – Sophomore; -- Ryan Sorahan – Sophomore; Split ends: 28 Sparky Hamilton – Junior; -- Bam Bryant – Junior; Defensive ends: 55 Carlos Hall – Senior; 56 Raymond House – Junior; 90 Justin Scott – Sophomore; 97 Keith Turner – Sophomore; 98 Elliott Harris – Freshman; Defensive tackles: 41 Scott Summers – Junior; 91 Pervis Osborne – Junior; 92 Arrion Dixon – Freshman; 99 Jason Peters – Freshman; -- James Johnson – Freshman; -- Austin Mendenhall – Freshman; Nose guards: 93 Jayson Johnson – Sophomore; 94 Curt Davis – Senior; 96 Pat Winn – Freshman; -- Derrick Anderson – Sophomore; Inside Linebackers: 34 Shane Collins – Freshman; 40 Jermaine Petty – Senior; -- Corey D. Harris – Sophomore; -- Clarke Moore – Freshman; -- Wesley O'Neal – Junior; Outside Linebackers: 14 Jimmy Beasley – Sophomore; 22 Tony Bua – Sophomore; 36 Josh Foliart – Senior; 42 Gavin Walls – Junior; 43 Caleb Miller – Sophomore; -- Pierre Brown – Freshman; -- Chris Clinton – Junior; -- Nathan Henry – Senior; -- Marcus Hill – Freshman; -- Jeb Huckeba – Freshman; -- Michael Malone – Junior; -- Marlon Moore – Sophomore; -- Michael Robinson – Freshman	Cornerbacks: 1 Lawrence Richardson – Sophomore; 2 Harold Harris – Junior; 25 Bo Mosley – Sophomore; 29 Kevin Baker – Sophomore; 30 Eddie Jackson – Sophomore; -- Decori Birmingham – Freshman; -- Ahmad Carroll – Freshman; -- Kyle Chastain – Freshman; -- Obi Emeasoba – Sophomore; -- Amaud Mitchell – Junior; Free Safeties: 6 Ken Hamlin – Sophomore; 16 Shelton Parker – Sophomore; 26 Tatum Owenby – Senior; -- Adam Almond – Sophomore; Strong Safeties: 24 Corey G. Harris – Senior; 31 D'Andre Berry – Senior; -- Judson Holloway – Junior; -- Lerinezo Robinson – Freshman; Punters: 35 Richie Butler – Junior; -- Josh Dennis – Freshman; Kickers: 27 Thomas LaToof – Junior; 41 Brennan O'Donohoe – Sophomore; -- Josh Ault – Freshman; -- Chris Balseiro – Freshman; -- Jason Campbell – Senior; -- David Carlton – Freshman; -- Ryan Gullett – Sophomore; -- Ross Novak – Freshman; -- Matthew Perry – Freshman; -- Jason Pledger – Junior; Long snappers: 51 Chuck Nalley – Junior; 59 Mark Stavely – Junior; -- Garrett Lewis – Freshman

== Awards and honors ==
=== All-SEC ===
- Jermaine Petty (LB, Sr.)1st Team All-SEC Defense (AP)
- Shawn Andrews (OT, Fr.) 2nd Team All-SEC Offense (AP)
- Kenny Sandlin (C, Sr.) 2nd Team All-SEC Offense (AP)
- Fred Talley (RB, Jr.) 2nd Team All-SEC Offense (Coaches')
- Ken Hamlin (FS, So.) 1st Team All-SEC Defense (AP)
- Carlos Hall (DE, Sr.) 2nd Team All-SEC Defense (AP)
- Tony Bua (OLB, So.) 2nd Team All-SEC Defense (AP)

=== All-Americans ===
- Jermaine Petty (LB, Sr.) AAFC, AFCA 1st
