= 2001 Ole Miss Rebels football team =

American college football season

2001 Ole Miss Rebels football
- Conference: Southeastern Conference
- Western Division
- Record: 7–4 (4–4 SEC)
- Head coach: David Cutcliffe (3rd season)
- Offensive coordinator: John Latina (2nd season)
- Offensive scheme: Pro-style
- Defensive coordinator: Don Lindsey (1st season)
- Base defense: 4–3
- Home stadium: Vaught–Hemingway Stadium

2001 Southeastern Conference football standings
	Conf.			Overall
Team	W		L	W		L
Eastern Division
No. 4 Tennessee x	7	–	1	11	–	2
No. 3 Florida %	6	–	2	10	–	2
No. 13 South Carolina	5	–	3	9	–	3
No. 22 Georgia	5	–	3	8	–	4
Kentucky	1	–	7	2	–	9
Vanderbilt	0	–	8	2	–	9
Western Division
No. 7 LSU xy$	5	–	3	10	–	3
Auburn x	5	–	3	7	–	5
Ole Miss	4	–	4	7	–	4
Alabama	4	–	4	7	–	5
Arkansas	4	–	4	7	–	5
Mississippi State	2	–	6	3	–	8
Championship: LSU 31, Tennessee 20
$ – BCS representative as conference champion; % – BCS at-large representative; x – Division champion/co-champions; y – Championship game participant; Rankings from AP Poll

The 2001 Ole Miss Rebels football team represented the University of Mississippi as a member of the Western Division of the Southeastern Conference (SEC) during the 2001 NCAA Division I-A football season. Led by third-year head coach David Cutcliffe, the Rebels compiled an overall record of 7–4 with a mark of 4–4 in conference play, placing in a three-way tie for third in the SEC's Western Division. Ole Miss played home games at Vaught–Hemingway Stadium in Oxford, Mississippi.

== Schedule ==
Date	Opponent	Site	TV	Result	Attendance
September 1	Murray State*	Vaught–Hemingway Stadium; Oxford, MS		W 49–14	
September 8	at Auburn	Jordan-Hare Stadium; Auburn, AL (rivalry)		L 21–27	86,063
September 29	at Kentucky	Commonwealth Stadium; Lexington, KY		W 42–31	60,814
October 6	at Arkansas State*	Indian Stadium; Jonesboro, AR		W 35–17	
October 13	Alabama	Vaught–Hemingway Stadium; Oxford, MS (rivalry)	JPS	W 27–24	47,110
October 20	Middle Tennessee State*	Vaught–Hemingway Stadium; Oxford, MS		W 45–17	46,886
October 27	at LSU	Tiger Stadium; Baton Rouge, LA (rivalry)		W 35–24	91,941
November 3	Arkansas	Vaught–Hemingway Stadium; Oxford, MS (rivalry)	ESPN2	L 56–58 ^{7OT}	47,464
November 17	No. 23 Georgia	Vaught–Hemingway Stadium; Oxford, MS	JPS	L 15–35	47,457
November 22	at Mississippi State	Davis Wade Stadium; Starkville, MS (Egg Bowl)	ESPN	L 28–36	51,112
December 1	Vanderbilt	Vaught–Hemingway Stadium; Oxford, MS (rivalry)		W 38–27	39,212
*Non-conference game; Rankings from AP Poll released prior to the game

== Roster ==
2001 Ole Miss Rebels football team roster
Players
Coaches
Offense

Pos.	#	Name	Class
		Jaime Armstrong
QB	10	Eli Manning	So

Defense

Pos.	#	Name	Class

Special teams

Pos.	#	Name	Class

Head coach

- David Cutcliffe

Coordinators/assistant coaches

- Mike MacIntyre – Defensive backs

Legend

- (C) Team captain
- (S) Suspended
- (I) Ineligible
- Injured
- Redshirt
