= 2001 Vanderbilt Commodores football team =

American college football season

2001 Vanderbilt Commodores football
- Conference: Southeastern Conference
- Eastern Division
- Record: 2–9 (0–8 SEC)
- Head coach: Woody Widenhofer (5th season)
- Offensive coordinator: Steve Crosby (4h season)
- Offensive scheme: Pro-style
- Defensive coordinator: Herb Paterra (2nd season)
- Base defense: 4–3
- Captains: Jamie Byrum; Antuian Bradford; Nate Morrow; Dan Stricker
- Home stadium: Vanderbilt Stadium

2001 Southeastern Conference football standings
	Conf.			Overall
Team	W		L	W		L
Eastern Division
No. 4 Tennessee x	7	–	1	11	–	2
No. 3 Florida %	6	–	2	10	–	2
No. 13 South Carolina	5	–	3	9	–	3
No. 22 Georgia	5	–	3	8	–	4
Kentucky	1	–	7	2	–	9
Vanderbilt	0	–	8	2	–	9
Western Division
No. 7 LSU xy$	5	–	3	10	–	3
Auburn x	5	–	3	7	–	5
Ole Miss	4	–	4	7	–	4
Alabama	4	–	4	7	–	5
Arkansas	4	–	4	7	–	5
Mississippi State	2	–	6	3	–	8
Championship: LSU 31, Tennessee 20
$ – BCS representative as conference champion; % – BCS at-large representative; x – Division champion/co-champions; y – Championship game participant; Rankings from AP Poll

The 2001 Vanderbilt Commodores football team represented Vanderbilt University as a member of the Eastern Division of the Southeastern Conference (SEC) during the 2001 NCAA Division I-A football season. Led by Woody Widenhofer in his fifth and final season as head coach, the Commodores compiled an overall record of 2–9 with a mark of 0–8 in conference play, placing last out of six teams in the SEC's Eastern Division. The team played home games at Vanderbilt Stadium in Nashville, Tennessee.

== Schedule ==
Date	Time	Opponent	Site	TV	Result	Attendance
August 30	7:00 p.m.	Middle Tennessee State*	Vanderbilt Stadium; Nashville, TN		L 28–37	39,885
September 8	11:30 a.m.	Alabama	Vanderbilt Stadium; Nashville, TN	JPS	L 9–12	37,318
September 22	6:00 p.m.	Richmond*	Vanderbilt Stadium; Nashville, TN		W 28–22	23,107
September 29	6:00 p.m.	Auburn	Vanderbilt Stadium; Nashville, TN	PPV	L 21–24	39,366
October 13	1:00 p.m.	No. 19 Georgia	Vanderbilt Stadium; Nashville, TN (rivalry)		L 14–30	31,847
October 20	6:00 p.m.	at No. 16 South Carolina	Williams-Brice Stadium; Columbia, SC		L 14–46	83,104
October 27	12:00 p.m.	at Duke*	Wallace Wade Stadium; Durham, NC		W 42–28	18,332
November 3	11:30 a.m.	at No. 4 Florida	Ben Hill Griffin Stadium; Gainesville, FL	JPS	L 13–71	85,052
November 10	1:00 p.m.	Kentucky	Vanderbilt Stadium; Nashville, TN (rivalry)		L 30–56	32,422
November 24	2:30 p.m.	at No. 7 Tennessee	Neyland Stadium; Knoxville, TN (rivalry)	CBS	L 0–38	102,519
December 1	11:30 a.m.	at Ole Miss	Vaught–Hemingway Stadium; Oxford, MS (rivalry)	JPS	L 27–38	39,212
*Non-conference game; Rankings from AP Poll released prior to the game; All times are in Central time

== Game summaries ==
=== Middle Tennessee ===
For the first time in 13 games MTSU defeated in-state rival Vanderbilt 37 to 28. This was the first meeting since 1956 despite the schools being located approximately 25 miles apart. MTSU running back Dwone Hicks rushed the ball 37 times for 203 yards and QB Wes Counts was 13 of 36 passes for 308 yards as Middle Tennessee won a season-opening game on the road for the first time since 1994 at Tennessee State. Vanderbilt QB Greg Zolman was 13 of 32 for 300 yards passing. Vanderbilt scored 28 points in the second quarter to go into halftime with a 28 to 24 point lead. Middle Tennessee would go on to score 13 unanswered points for the win.

Scoring summary

- MTSU- Hicks 1 run (Kelly kick)
- MTSU- Hicks 1 run (Kelly kick)
- Vandy- R Williams 3 run (Folino kick)
- Vandy- L Thomas 26 run (Folino kick)
- MTSU- FG Kelly 22
- Vandy- Stricker 48 pass from Zolman (Folino kick)
- MTSU- Hicks 1 run (Kelly kick)
- Vandy- M Garrett 73 pass from Zolman (Folino kick)
- MTSU- Hicks 2 run (kick failed)
- MTSU- Counts 9 run (Kelly kick)

Player statistics

- Rushing
- Middle Tenn – Hicks 37-203, Lee 7-48, Wright 2-31, Counts 6-18.
- Vanderbilt – L Thomas 7-71, R Williams 12-60, Stricker 2-25, Young 2-23, Zolman 3-11, Mathenia 1-1, Purkey 1-minus 14.
- Passing
- Middle Tenn – Counts 27-36-0-308
- Vanderbilt – Zolman 13-32-0-300
- Receiving
- Middle Tenn – K Newson 9-113, T Calico 6-83, H Johnson 5-48, Youell 4-34, Lee 2-22, Payne 1-8.
- Vanderbilt – M Garrett 8-219, Stricker 3-70, Hasanoglu 1-9, R Williams 1-2.

Team stats

- Middle Tenn/ Vanderbilt
- First downs 37/ 17
- Rushed-yards 52-300/ 28-177
- Passing yards 308 /300
- Sacked-yards lost 2-15/ 0-0
- Return yards 20 /26
- Passes 27-36-0/ 13-32-0
- Punts 3-42.7 /5-43.6
- Fumbles-lost 2-1/ 2-0
- Penalties-yards 9-56/ 11-83
- Time of possession 39:55/ 20:05

Team	1	2	3	4	Total
• MTSU	14	10	6	7	37
Vanderbilt	0	28	0	0	28

- Location: Nashville, Tennessee
- Game start: 12:49 p.m.
- Game attendance: 39,885
- Game weather: 88°, Partly cloudy

=== Alabama ===
This was Dennis Franchione's first win at Alabama as ahead football coach. With 5:01 remaining in the game Neal Thomas' fourth field goal sealed the victory for the Crimson Tide. Earlier in the week, Alabama had received official word from the NCAA detailing rules allegations that include payoffs and academic fraud. Chuck Folino kicked three field goals for the Commodores, who started the season 0–2 and 0–1 SEC West.

This was the 17th consecutive victory for Alabama over Vanderbilt and had an overall record of 55–19–4 over Vanderbilt. Entering the fourth period Alabama had a 3-point lead when Folino tied the game with a 38-yarder and 7:10 to play. Vanderbilt's Greg Zolman was 17 of 34 for 253 yards passing. Lew Thomas had 10 carries for 89 yards rushing. Alabama's Ahmad Galloway rushed the ball 24 times for 144 yards. Alabama's record was 1–1 and 1–0 in the SEC East.

Scoring summary

- Vanderbilt- FG Folino 20
- Alabama- FG N Thomas 35
- Alabama- FG N Thomas 26
- Vanderbilt- FG Folino 25
- Alabama- FG N Thomas 31
- Vanderbilt- FG Folino 38
- Alabama- FG Thomas 27

Player statistics

- Rushing
- Alabama – Galloway 24-144, Hudson 11-69, T Watts 8-16.
- Vanderbilt – L Thomas 10-89, R Williams 14-32, Stricker 3-16, Mathenia 1-7, Zolman 6-5, Team 1-minus 6.
- Passing
- Alabama – T Watts 10-17-0-128.
- Vanderbilt – Zolman 17-34-0-253, Stricker 0-1-0-0.
- Receiving
- Alabama – A Carter 3-30, Luke 2-28, T Jones Jr. 2 – 28, Th Sanders 1-26, F Milons 1-8, Collins 1-8.
- Vanderbilt – Stricker 3-75, Smith 3-73, Mathenia 3-41, R Williams 3-23, Hatcher 2-27, M Garrett 1-9, L Thomas 1-5, Hasanoglu 1-0.

Team statistics

- Alabama /Vanderbilt
- First downs 17 /20
- Rushed-yards 43-229/ 35-143
- Passing yards 128 /253
- Sacked-yards lost 1-7 /2-12
- Return yards 12 /0
- Passes 10-17-0 /17-35-0
- Punts 3-28.3 /3-57.0
- Fumbles-lost 0-0/ 0-0
- Penalties-yards 4-30 /6-33
- Time of possession 30:19/ 29:41

Team	1	2	3	4	Total
• Alabama	0	6	3	3	12
Vanderbilt	3	3	0	3	9

- Location: Nashville, Tennessee.
- Game start: 4:18 p.m.
- Game attendance: 3,7318
- Television network: JPS

=== Richmond ===
Vanderbilt rallied back in the third quarter with two Lew Thomas 1-yard rushing touchdowns. This was Vandy's first victory of the year; it was over a D I-AA Richmond Spiders, who were (0 2) Richmond made it a close game on a Scott Fulton three yard run with 4:14 remaining in the fourth quarter. Richmond had lost to Virginia on September 1, 2001 17 16 both losses were to a Division I-A school.

Richmond took a 10–0 lead in the first quarter, on Gustus' four-yard TD run and Doug Kirchner's 31-yard field goal. Richmond was ahead 16 with 4:06 remaining in the first half. Vandy closed to 16–14 gaining momentum on Greg Zolman's second TD pass a 12 pass to Dan Stricker with 0:39 left remaining in the second quarter. Vanderbilt scored its first points on a 41-yard pass Zoleman to Stricker with 0;04 remaining in the first quarter.

This was the first meeting of the teams Richmond had a record of 0–12 all time against the SEC. Vanderbilt's Greg Zolman completed 20 of 32 passes for 236 yards, Lew Thomas rushed 93 yards on 15 carries. Dan Striker had 6 receptions for 84 yards and 2 TD's. Richmond's Gustus completed 6 passes of 14 for 125 yards and ran for 54 yards on 18 attempts.

Scoring summary

- Richmond- Gatus 4 run (Kirchner kick)
- Richmond- FG Kirchner 31
- Vanderbilt- Stricker 41 pass from Zolman (Stover kick)
- Richmond- Gatus 1 run (kick failed)
- Vanderbilt- Stricker 12 pass from Zolman (Stover kick)
- Vanderbilt- L Thomas 1 run (Zolman run for two-point conversion)
- Vanderbilt- L Thomas 1 run (two point conversion failed)
- Richmond- Fulton 3 run (two point conversion failed)

Player statistics

- Rushing
- Richmond – Gustus 18-54, Purnell 8-35, D Wills 6-30, Diggs 5-21, Fulton 6-20, Edwards 4-18, Roane 2-7, Alkebu-lan 1-4, Team 1-minus 20.
- Vanderbilt – L Thomas 15-93, Zolman 3-9, Hasanoglu 1-9, R Williams 6-5, Hatcher 1-0.
- Passing
- Richmond – Gustus 6-14-0-125, D Wills 2-4-0-16.
- Vanderbilt – Zolman 20-32-0-236.
- Receiving
- Richmond – Mcnair 3-69, Roane 3-52, Purnell 2-20.
- Vanderbilt – Stricker 6-84, M Garrett 4-46, Hatcher 3-61, Hasanoglu 2-15, Simone 1-10, Mathenia 1-9, C Brancheau 1-7, L Thomas 1-3, E Robinson 1-1.

Team Stats

- Richmond/ Vanderbilt
- First downs 17 /16
- Rushed-yards 51-169/ 26-116
- Passing yards 141/ 236
- Sacked-yards lost 0-0/ 0-0
- Return yards 15 20
- Passes 8-18-0 /20-32-0
- Punts 4-34.5/ 5-32.8
- Fumbles-lost 2-0/ 1-1
- Penalties-yards 8-66/ 7-44
- Time of possession 35:47/ 24:13

Team	1	2	3	4	Total
Richmond	10	6	0	6	22
• Vanderbilt	7	7	14	0	28

- Location: Nashville, Tennessee
- Game start: 10:11 a.m
- Game attendance: 23,107

=== Auburn ===
Vanderbilt and Auburn Tigers had played only 10 time between 1955 and 2001. Auburn won them all the previous three meetings Auburn out scored Vanderbilt 78–17. This was a hard fought game by Vandy as the teams were tied 3 times in the game.

Auburn scored first on Chris Williams 51 yard touchdown run with 2:08 into the game. Vanderbilt scored on a four-yard run by Lew Thomas with 8:43 in the third quarter and Tigers' freshman quarterback Jason Campbell passed to Robert Johnson for a 35-yard touchdown pass 1:11 later. The Commodores tied again on a two-yard run by Thomas in the third before the Tigers' scored again on a one-yard run by Williams with 0:50 left in the third.

The fourth Vanderbilt marched 83-yards and scored on a Dan Stricker four-yard reception from Zolman for Vandy's final point of the game. The Tigers' scored last on a Damon Duval's 49 yard field goal with 2:58 remaining in the game. Vanderbilt made an effort to get into field goal range, however, turned the ball over on downs after driving 52 yards.

Scoring summary

- Auburn – C Williams 51 run (Duval kick)
- Vanderbilt – L Thomas 4 run (Stover kick)
- Auburn – Ro Johnson 35 pass from Campbell (Duval kick)
- Vanderbilt – L Thomas 2 run (Stover kick)
- Auburn – C Williams 1 run (Duval kick)
- Vanderbilt – Stricker 4 pass from Zolman (Stover kick)
- Auburn – FG Duval 49

Player statistics

- Rushing
- Auburn – C Williams 6-56, C Moore 11-23, Campbell 9-22, B Johnson 1-7, Team 1-minus 1.
- Vanderbilt – L Thomas 27-173, R Williams 3-8, Team 1-minus 1, Purkey 1-minus 2, Zolman 5-minus 10.
- Passing
- Auburn – Campbell 17-24-0-247.
- Vanderbilt – Zolman 20-42-1-162, Stricker 0-1-0-0.
- Receiving
- Auburn – M Willis 4-87, Ro Johnson 4-56, Carter 3-38, C Moore 3-38, Diamond 1-11, D Green 1-10, J Walkins 1-7.
- Vanderbilt – Stricker 6-63, M Garrett 3-16, Hasanoglu 2-26, R Williams 2-13, Simone 2-9, Young 2-5, Smith 1-19, Hatcher 1-8, L Thomas 1-3.

Team stats

- Auburn / Vanderbilt
- First downs 13 / 18
- Rushed-yards 28-107 / 37-168
- Passing yards 247 /162
- Sacked-yards lost 2-25 /1-11
- Return yards 57 / 45
- Passes 17-24-0 /20-43-1
- Punts 6-45.5 / 7-37.0
- Fumbles-lost 4-2 /1-1
- Penalties-yards 10-89 /5-50
- Time of possession 26:11/33:49

Team	1	2	3	4	Total
• Auburn	7	0	14	3	24
Vanderbilt	0	0	14	7	21

- Location: Nashville, Tennessee
- Game start: 9:45 a.m.
- Game attendance: 39,366

=== Georgia ===
Scoring summary

- Georgia – M Smith 3 run (Bennett kick)
- Georgia – M Smith 40 run (Bennett kick)
- Georgia – Gibson 58 pass from Da Greene (Bennett kick)
- Vanderbilt – M Garrett 8 pass from Zolman (Folino kick)
- Georgia – FG Bennett 27
- Vanderbilt – Zolman 1 run (Folino kick)
- Georgia – Edwards 17 pass from Da Greene (two-point conversion failed)

Player statistics

- Rushing
- Georgia – M Smith 9-69, Haynes 7-25, Gibson 1-22, Sanks 4-21, K Bailey 3-12, Team 1-minus 1, Da Greene 6-minus 9.
- Vanderbilt – L Thomas 23-75, R Williams 3-28, Stricker 1-15, Mathenia 2-14, Zolman 9-minus 12.
- Passing
- Georgia – Da Greene 19-26-0-305.
- Vanderbilt – Zolman 24-50-0-316.
- Receiving
- Georgia – Gibson 6-106, Haynes 3-88, Mcmichael 3-44, Edwards 3-35, Mitchell 2-13, Watson 1-10, K Bailey 1-9.
- Vanderbilt – Stricker 8-137, Mathenia 6-78, L Thomas 4-27, M Garrett 2-17, Simone 2-6, Young 1-49, Hasanoglu 1-2.

Team stats

- Georgia/ Vanderbilt
- First downs 20/ 23
- Rushed-yards 31-139/ 38-120
- Passing yards 305 /316
- Sacked-yards lost 2-12/ 1-14
- Return yards 0 /11
- Passes 19-26-0 /24-50-0
- Punts 5-45.8 /73-36.3
- Fumbles-lost 3-3 /2-1
- Penalties-yards 12-76/ 9-79
- Time of possession 25:20/ 34:40

Team	1	2	3	4	Total
• Georgia	14	10	6	0	30
Vanderbilt	0	7	7	0	14

- Location: Nashville, Tennessee
- Game start: 5:10 p.m
- Game attendance: 31,847

=== At South Carolina ===
Vanderbilt was blown-out by South Carolina and the team was weakening. Before the Georgia game all games where close the next 5 SEC team would do the same thing to the down and out Dores. Other than Duke Vandy was at least a 14-point underdog.

Scoring summary

- South Carolina -TD: BRIAN SCOTT 41 Yard Pass From PHIL PETTY (DANIEL WEAVER Kick), 3:53
- South Carolina – TD: DEREK WATSON 7 Yard Run (DANIEL WEAVER Kick), 12:48
- Vanderbilt – TD: GREG ZOLMAN 1 Yard Run (CHUCK FOLINO Kick), 6:36
- South Carolina – FG: DANIEL WEAVER 42 Yard, 9:55
- South Carolina – SAFETY: 13:50
- Vanderbilt – TD: TOM SIMONE 19 Yard Pass From GREG ZOLMAN (CHUCK FOLINO Kick), 1:38
- South Carolina – TD: ANDREW PINNOCK 15 Yard Run (DANIEL WEAVER Kick), 5:06
- South Carolina – TD: CHAVEZ DONNINGS 14 Yard Pass From PHIL PETTY (TWO-POINT CONVERSION FAILED), 9:43
- South Carolina – TD: COREY JENKINS 5 Yard Run (DANIEL WEAVER Kick), 1:16
- South Carolina – TD: WILLIS HAM 10 Yard Pass From DONDRIAL PINKINS (DANIEL WEAVER Kick), 7:02

Team	1	2	3	4	Total
Vanderbilt	0	7	7	0	14
• 16 South Carolina	14	5	13	14	46

- Location: Durham, South Carolina
- Game start: 3:19 p.m.
- Game attendance: 83,104

=== At Duke ===
Vanderbilt has its only road win and last win of the year, to a Duke team that was 0–7 before the Vandy game, and finished 0–11.

Scoring summary

- Duke – Wade 1 run (Garber kick)
- Vanderbilt – Stricker 45 pass from Zolman (Folino kick)
- Vanderbilt – R Williams 1 run (Folino kick)
- Duke – Brzezinski 4 pass from Bryant (Garber kick)
- Vanderbilt – R Williams 2 run (Folino kick)
- Vanderbilt – M Garrett 54 pass from Zolman (Folino kick)
- Vanderbilt – Mathenia 13 run (Folino kick)
- Duke – Bryant 1 run (kick failed)
- Duke – M Hart 31 pass from Bryant (M Hart reception for two-point conversion)
- Vanderbilt – Zolman 6 run (Folino kick)

Player statistics

- Rushing
- Vanderbilt – R Williams 18-155, L Thomas 8-123, Zolman 10-32, Mathenia 2-16, Stricker 1-9, Hatcher 1-3.
- Duke – Douglas 29-169, Wade 16-39, Sharpe 1-13, K Moore 2-11, Bryant 8-3, Dargan 1-3.
- Passing
- Vanderbilt – Zolman 8-18-0-168, Olmstead 1-1-0-7.
- Duke – Bryant 19-36-4-295, Mcdonald 1-1-0-4.
- Receiving
- Vanderbilt – Stricker 4-101, Hatcher 2-3, M Garrett 1-54, R Williams 1-10, L Thomas 1-7.
- Duke – M Hart 4-86, Wade 4-38, Erdeljac 3-52, Sharpe 3-24, Love 2-36, Brzezinski 2-26, K Moore 1-37, Douglas 1-0.

Team stats

- Vanderbilt /Duke
- First downs 16 /28
- Rushed-yards 40-338/ 57-238
- Passing yards 175 /299
- Sacked-yards lost 1-4/ 2-20
- Return yards 87 /8
- Passes 9-19-0 /20-37-4
- Punts 4-37.8 /3-39.0
- Fumbles-lost 4-2 /3-1
- Penalties-yards 7-86 /7-55
- Time of possession 23:33/ 36:27

Team	1	2	3	4	Total
• Vanderbilt	0	14	21	7	42
Duke	7	7	0	14	28

- Location: Durham, North Carolina
- Game start: 5:38 p.m.
- Game attendance: 18,332

=== At Florida ===
"I don't really like these kind of games", Spurrier said. "We got way ahead early and you can tell Vandy had lost their spirit, lost their fight somewhat. Sometimes these kinds of wins could be misleading to your players. So hopefully we don't get too full of ourselves and think we're that many points better than anybody."

Scoring summary

- Florida – Graham 2 run (Chandler kick)
- Florida – Graham 5 run (Chandler kick)
- Florida – Gaffney 7 pass from Grossman (Chandler kick)
- Florida – FG Chandler 37
- Florida – T Jacobs 13 pass from Grossman (Chandler kick)
- Florida – Caldwell 20 pass from Grossman (kick failed)
- Florida – Davis 25 interception return (Chandler kick)
- Florida – T Jacobs 2 pass from Berlin (Talcott kick)
- Florida – Green 5 run (Talcott kick)
- Florida – Perez 15 pass from Berlin (Talcott kick)
- Florida – Wells 6 pass from Berlin (kick failed)
- Vanderbilt – B Walker 27 run (Folino kick)
- Vanderbilt – B Walker 2 run (kick failed)

Player statistics

- Rushing
- Vanderbilt – N Mckenzie 5-37, R Williams 15-34, B Walker 4-33, Mathenia 2-5, Hatcher 1-1, Webb 1-minus 8, Zolman 7-minus 12, Olmstead 3-minus 27.
- Florida – Green 11-49, R Carthon 9-39, Graham 9-35, Gillespie 3-14, Grossman 3-12, Perez 1-12, Kight 1-7.
- Passing
- Vanderbilt – Zolman 8-17-1-80, Olmstead 5-9-1-81, B Walker 2-3-0-48, Team 0-1-0-0.
- Florida – Grossman 17-29-1-306, Berlin 7-9-0-74, Creveling 1-2-0-23.
- Receiving
- Vanderbilt – Stricker 5-87, R Williams 4-44, Mathenia 2-24, Smith 1-43, N Mckenzie 1-6, Hasanoglu 1-5, Hatcher 1-0.
- Florida – T Jacobs 6-105, Caldwell 4-117, Gaffney 4-55, M Jackson 2-37, Perez 2-32, Gillespie 2-15, Haugabrook 1-23, Graham 1-9, Wells 1-6, R Carthon 1-3, Roberts 1-1.

Team stats

- Vanderbilt /Florida
- First downs 14 /28
- Rushed-yards 38-63/ 37-168
- Passing yards 209 /403
- Sacked-yards lost 6-44/ 0-0
- Return yards 8 /94
- Passes 15-30-2/ 25-40-1
- Punts 7-26.6 /0-0.0
- Fumbles-lost 3-3 /3-2
- Penalties-yards 3-28 /9-59
- Time of possession 30:35/ 29:25

Team	1	2	3	4	Total
Vanderbilt	0	0	0	13	13
• Florida	24	13	28	6	71

- Location: Gainesville, Florida
- Game start: 5:00 p.m.
- Game attendance: 85,052

=== Kentucky ===
Jared Lorenzen threw for a season-high 453 yards and a career-high six touchdowns to lead Kentucky to a 56-30 rout over Vanderbilt in a Southeastern Conference matchup.

Dan Stricker caught 12 passes for a career-high 204 yards and two touchdowns for Vanderbilt. Rodney Williams had four catches for a season-high 102 yards and rushed for 85 yards on 18 carries.

Scoring summary

- Vanderbilt – Stricker 2 pass from Zolman (kick failed)
- Kentucky – Abney 52 pass from Lorenzen (kick failed)
- Kentucky – D Smith 43 pass from Lorenzen (Hanson kick)
- Vanderbilt – Stricker 21 pass from Zolman (Folino kick)
- Kentucky – Cook 21 pass from Lorenzen (Hanson kick)
- Kentucky – FG Hanson 27
- Kentucky – Ja White 82 fumble return (Hanson kick)
- Vanderbilt – R Williams 2 run (Stover kick)
- Kentucky – D Smith 51 pass from Lorenzen (Hanson kick)
- Vanderbilt – Zolman 1 run (Stover kick)
- Kentucky – Abney 5 pass from Lorenzen (kick failed)
- Vanderbilt – FG Stover 23
- Kentucky – Pinner 1 run (kick failed)
- Kentucky – Cook 28 pass from Lorenzen (Hanson kick)

Player statistics

- Rushing
- Kentucky – Pinner 9-33, M Johnson 6-33, Lorenzen 5-32, C Scott 8-15, Boyd 1-11, Cook 1-6.
- Vanderbilt – R Williams 18-76, N Mckenzie 4-24, B Walker 2-15, Mathenia 2-1, Stricker 1-1, Zolman 8-minus 15.
- Passing
- Kentucky – Lorenzen 26-37-0-453.
- Vanderbilt – Zolman 29-45-1-441, B Walker 0-2-0-0, Young 1-1-0-minus 1.
- Receiving
- Kentucky – Abney 7-113, Cook 5-77, D Smith 4-130, C Scott 3-27, Allen 2-33, C Harp 1-22, Pinner 1-20, Simms 1-15, Kelly 1-11, Boone 1-5.
- Vanderbilt – Stricker 12-204, M Garrett 5-58, R Williams 4-102, Smith 3-38, Hasanoglu 2-12, Hatcher 1-18, E Robinson 1-5, C Brancheau 1-4, Zolman 1-minus 1.

Team stats

- Kentucky /Vanderbilt
- First downs 26 /34
- Rushed-yards 30-130/ 35-102
- Passing yards 453 /440
- Sacked-yards lost 1-11/ 4-24
- Return yards 114 /9
- Passes 26-37-0 /30-48-1
- Punts 2-51.0 /3-42.7
- Fumbles-lost 1-1 /2-2
- Penalties-yards 14-133/ 6-42
- Time of possession 27:48/ 32:12

Team	1	2	3	4	Total
• Kentucky	13	17	13	13	56
Vanderbilt	6	7	17	0	30

- Location: Nashville, Tennessee
- Game attendance: 32,422

=== At Tennessee ===
"There is plenty to worry about this week", Tennessee coach Phillip Fulmer said. "We were able to get through this one and play a lot of people, but we have a lot of people banged up. Right now, our focus and attention is to get ready for Florida."

Scoring summary

- Tennessee – FG A Walls 37
- Tennessee – FG A Walls 27
- Tennessee – Washington 10 pass from Clausen (D Stallworth reception for two-point conversion)
- Tennessee – D Stallworth 55 punt return (A Walls kick)
- Tennessee – D Stallworth 80 pass from Clausen (A Walls kick)
- Tennessee – FG A Walls 42
- Tennessee – Houston 20 run (Chauvin kick)

Player statistics

- Rushing
- Vanderbilt – R Williams 21-72, N Mckenzie 3-20, B Walker 1-17, Mathenia 1-4, Stricker 1-2, Zolman 9-minus 54.
- Tennessee – T Stephens 16-65, Houston 5-54, Davis 5-43, Clausen 1-10, Tinsley 2-7, Mathews 3-4, Fleming 2-3, Bartholomew 1-3.
- Passing
- Vanderbilt – Zolman 17-26-2-144, B Walker 0-1-1-0.
- Tennessee – Clausen 20-29-0-278, Mathews 1-2-0-7.
- Receiving
- Vanderbilt – Stricker 6-41, Mathenia 4-40, Hasanoglu 2-18, R Williams 2-11, Young 1-15, Simone 1-14, M Garrett 1-5.
- Tennessee – Washington 6-60, D Stallworth 4-128, Graham 3-32, T Stephens 3-15, Witten 2-38, Scott 1-7, M Jones 1-4, Parker 1-1

Team stats

- Vanderbilt /Tennessee
- First downs 16 /22
- Rushed-yards 36-61/ 35-189
- Passing yards 144 /285
- Sacked-yards lost 5-56/ 0-0
- Return yards 0 /133
- Passes 17-27-3 /21-31-0
- Punts 6-45.7 /1-44.0
- Fumbles-lost 1-0 /3-2
- Penalties-yards 8-60 /10-96
- Time of possession 31:50/ 28:10

Team	1	2	3	4	Total
Vanderbilt	0	0	0	0	0
• Tennessee	3	18	10	7	38

- Location: Knoxville, Tennessee

=== At Ole Miss ===
Ole Miss (7-4, 4-4) trailed, 20-3, midway through the third quarter. But Eli Manning hit four different teammates for scores during a 14:24 span. He completed his third fourth-quarter comeback of the season with a 39-yard TD strike to freshman receiver Jason Armstead, giving the Rebels a 31–27 lead with 3:34 left.

Scoring summary

- Vanderbilt – M Garrett 26 pass from Zolman (kick failed)
- Mississippi – FG J Nichols 39
- Vanderbilt – Stricker 50 pass from Zolman (Stover kick)
- Vanderbilt – Zolman 3 run (Stover kick)
- Mississippi – C Stackhouse 13 pass from Manning (J Nichols kick)
- Mississippi – Flowers 25 pass from Manning (J Nichols kick)
- Vanderbilt – Mathenia 28 pass from Zolman (Stover kick)
- Mississippi – J Armstrong 15 pass from Manning (J Nichols kick)
- Mississippi – J Armstead 39 pass from Manning (J Nichols kick)
- Mississippi – Gunn 10 run (J Nichols kick)

Player statistics

- Rushing
- Vanderbilt – R Williams 16-96, Stricker 3-15, Zolman 6-9, N Mckenzie 1-minus 1.
- Mississippi – Gunn 32-157, Williams 3-22, Sanford 2-12, C Stackhouse 2-10, Manning 2-1, Team 1-minus 1.
- Passing
- Vanderbilt – Zolman 23-41-2-286.
- Mississippi – Manning 23-40-3-286.
- Receiving
- Vanderbilt – Stricker 11-169, Mathenia 4-49, M Garrett 2-31, R Williams 2-7, Simone 1-21, Hasanoglu 1-4, Smith 1-3, Young 1-2.
- Mississippi – J Armstead 6-91, Flowers 5-72, J Armstrong 4-64, Ch Collins 3-14, C Stackhouse 2-22, Skrmetta 2-20, Williams 1-3.

Team statistics

- Vanderbilt /Mississippi
- First downs 19 /32
- Rushed-yards 26-119/ 42-201
- Passing yards 286 /286
- Sacked-yards lost 1-7/ 0-0
- Return yards 36 /38
- Passes 23-41-2 /23-40-3
- Punts 6-45.2 /4-38.8
- Fumbles-lost 1-1 /0-0
- Penalties-yards 7-54 /5-45
- Time of possession 27:10/ 32:50

Team	1	2	3	4	Total
Vanderbilt	6	0	14	7	27
• Ole Miss	3	0	7	28	38

- Location: Oxford, Mississippi
- Game attendance: 39,212
- Television network: CBS

== Roster ==
2001 Vanderbilt Commodores football team roster
Players
Coaches
Offense

Pos.	#	Name	Class
WR	1	Anthony Jones	Jr
RB	2	Rodney Williams	Sr
QB	12	Greg Zolman	Sr
QB	17	Jay Cutler	Fr

Defense

Pos.	#	Name	Class
DB	5	Aaron McWherter	Jr
LB	47	Hunter Hillenmeyer	Jr

Special teams

Pos.	#	Name	Class

Head coach

- Woody Widenhofer

Coordinators/assistant coaches

- Steve Crosby (offensive coordinator, wide receivers coach)
- Ed Lambert (assistant head coach, running backs coach)
- Dino Folino (defensive backs coach)
- Dennis Harrison (defensive line coach)
- Bill Laveroni (offensive line coach)
- Bill Maskill (tight ends coach, special teams coordinator)
- Herb Paterra (defensive coordinator, linebackers coach
- Jeff Rutledge (quarterbacks coach)
- Ray Zingler (outside linebackers coach, recruiting coordinator)

Legend

- (C) Team captain
- (S) Suspended
- (I) Ineligible
- Injured
- Redshirt

Roster
Last update: 2001-11-02

== Team stats ==
=== Passing ===
Rk	Player	Comp	Att	Pct	Yds	Y/A	TD	Int	Rate
1	**Greg Zolman**	**186**	**357**	52.1	**2512**	7.0	**14**	**9**	**119.1**
2	Tim Olmstead	6	10	**60.0**	88	**8.8**	0	1	113.9
3	Benji Walker	2	6	33.3	48	8.0	0	1	67.2
4	Dan Stricker	0	2	0.0	0	0.0	0	0	0.0
5	Chris Young	1	1	100.0	-1	-1.0	0	0	91.6
**Bold text** denotes team leader

=== Rushing, receiving, and scrimmage ===
Rk	Player	Att	Yds	Avg	TD	Rec	Yds	Avg	TD	Plays	Yds	Avg	TD
1	Rodney Williams	**131**	590	4.5	4	19	212	11.2	0	**150**	802	5.3	4
2	Lew Thomas	105	**675**	6.4	**5**	10	80	8.0	0	115	755	6.6	5
3	Greg Zolman	69	-8	-0.1	**5**	1	-1	-1.0	0	70	-9	-0.1	5
4	Dan Stricker	15	80	5.3	0	**65**	**1079**	16.6	**8**	80	**1159**	**14.5**	**8**
5	Norval McKenzie	13	80	6.2	0	1	6	6.0	0	14	86	6.1	0
6	Jason Mathenia	11	48	4.4	1	22	258	11.7	1	33	306	9.3	2
7	Benji Walker	7	65	9.3	2	0	0	0	0	7	65	9.3	2
8	Ronald Hatcher	3	4	1.3	0	10	117	11.7	0	13	121	9.3	0
9	Tim Olmstead	3	-27	-9.0	0	0	0	0	0	3	-27	-9.0	0
10	Chris Young	2	23	**11.5**	0	5	71	14.2	0	7	94	13.4	0
11	Nezih Hasanoglu	1	9	9.0	0	13	91	7.0	0	14	100	7.1	0
12	Justin Purkey	1	-2	-2.0	0	0	0	0	0	1	-2	-2.0	0
13	Joe Webb	1	-8	-8.0	0	0	0	0	0	1	-8	-8.0	0
14	M.J. Garrett	0	0	0	0	27	455	16.9	4	27	455	16.9	4
15	Brandon Smith	0	0	0	0	9	176	**19.6**	0	9	176	19.6	0
16	Tom Simone	0	0	0	0	9	86	9.6	1	9	86	9.6	1
17	Curtis Brancheau	0	0	0	0	2	11	5.5	0	2	11	5.5	0
18	Everett Robinson	0	0	0	0	2	6	3.0	0	2	6	3.0	0
**Bold text** denotes team leader

=== Kick and punt returns ===
Rk	Player	K-Ret	Yds	Avg	TD	P-Ret	Yds	Avg	TD
1	Ronald Hatcher	**29**	**595**	20.5	0	**15**	**107**	**7.1**	0
2	Jason Mathenia	15	330	**22.0**	0	0	0	0	0
3	Curtis Brancheau	1	15	15.0	0	0	0	0	0
4	Doug Wolford	1	11	11.0	0	0	0	0	0
5	Tom Simone	1	5	5.0	0	0	0	0	0
**Bold text** denotes team leader

=== Kicking and punting ===
Rk	Player	XPM	XPA	XP%	FGM	FGA	FG%	Pts	Punts	Yds	Avg
1	Chuck Folino	**16**	**18**	88.9	**3**	**6**	**50.0**	**25**	0	0	0
2	Stover	10	11	**90.9**	1	4	25.0	13	0	0	0
3	Jimmy Stover	10	11	**90.9**	1	4	25.0	13	0	0	0
4	Joe Webb	0	0	0	0	0	0	0	**57**	**2358**	**41.4**
**Bold text** denotes team leader
