= 2001 Georgia Bulldogs football team =

American college football season

2001 Georgia Bulldogs football

Music City Bowl, L 16–20 vs. Boston College
- Conference: Southeastern Conference
- Eastern Division

Ranking
- Coaches: No. 25
- AP: No. 22
- Record: 8–4 (5–3 SEC)
- Head coach: Mark Richt (1st season)
- Offensive coordinator: Neil Callaway (1st season)
- Offensive scheme: Pro-style
- Defensive coordinator: Brian VanGorder (1st season)
- Base defense: 4–3
- Home stadium: Sanford Stadium

2001 Southeastern Conference football standings
	Conf.			Overall
Team	W		L	W		L
Eastern Division
No. 4 Tennessee x	7	–	1	11	–	2
No. 3 Florida %	6	–	2	10	–	2
No. 13 South Carolina	5	–	3	9	–	3
No. 22 Georgia	5	–	3	8	–	4
Kentucky	1	–	7	2	–	9
Vanderbilt	0	–	8	2	–	9
Western Division
No. 7 LSU xy$	5	–	3	10	–	3
Auburn x	5	–	3	7	–	5
Ole Miss	4	–	4	7	–	4
Alabama	4	–	4	7	–	5
Arkansas	4	–	4	7	–	5
Mississippi State	2	–	6	3	–	8
Championship: LSU 31, Tennessee 20
$ – BCS representative as conference champion; % – BCS at-large representative; x – Division champion/co-champions; y – Championship game participant; Rankings from AP Poll

The 2001 Georgia Bulldogs football team represented the University of Georgia as a member of the Southeastern Conference during the 2001 NCAA Division I-A football season. Led by first-year Mark Richt, the Bulldogs compiled an overall record of 8–4 record with a mark of 5–3 in conference play, tying for third place in the SEC's Eastern Division. Georgia was invited to the Music City Bowl, where the Bulldogs lost to Boston College. The team played home games at Sanford Stadium in Athens, Georgia.

== Schedule ==
Date	Time	Opponent	Rank	Site	TV	Result	Attendance
September 1	1:00 p.m.	Arkansas State*		Sanford Stadium; Athens, GA	PPV	W 45–17	86,520
September 8	7:45 p.m.	No. 21 South Carolina	No. 25	Sanford Stadium; Athens, GA (rivalry)	ESPN	L 9–14	86,520
September 29	6:30 p.m.	Arkansas		Sanford Stadium; Athens, GA	ESPN2	W 34–23	86,520
October 6	12:00 p.m.	at No. 6 Tennessee		Neyland Stadium; Knoxville, TN (rivalry)	CBS	W 26–24	107,592
October 13	2:00 p.m.	at Vanderbilt	No. 19	Vanderbilt Stadium; Nashville, TN (rivalry)		W 30–14	31,847
October 20	12:30 p.m.	Kentucky^{†}	No. 17	Sanford Stadium; Athens, GA	JPS	W 43–29	86,520
October 27	3:30 p.m.	vs. No. 6 Florida	No. 15	Alltel Stadium; Jacksonville, FL (rivalry)	CBS	L 10–24	84,401
November 10	3:30 p.m.	No. 24 Auburn	No. 19	Sanford Stadium; Athens, GA (Deep South's Oldest Rivalry)	CBS	L 17–24	86,520
November 17	12:30 p.m.	at Ole Miss	No. 23	Vaught–Hemingway Stadium; Oxford, MS	JPS	W 35–15	47,457
November 24	7:45 p.m.	at No. 21 Georgia Tech*	No. 19	Bobby Dodd Stadium; Atlanta, GA (Clean, Old-Fashioned Hate)	ESPN	W 31–17	41,974
December 1	12:00 p.m.	Houston*	No. 16	Sanford Stadium; Athens, GA		W 35–7	86,520
December 28	5:00 p.m.	vs. Boston College*	No. 16	Adelphia Coliseum; Nashville, TN (Music City Bowl)	ESPN	L 16–20	46,125
*Non-conference game; ^{†}Homecoming; Rankings from AP Poll released prior to the game; All times are in Eastern time

== Game summaries ==
=== Vanderbilt ===
Team	1	2	3	4	Total
• Georgia	14	10	6	0	30
Vanderbilt	0	7	7	0	14

- Date: October 13
- Location: Vanderbilt Stadium, Nashville, Tennessee
- Game attendance: 31,847

Scoring summary
Q1	13:41	UGA	Musa Smith 3 yard run (Billy Bennett kick)	UGA 7–0
Q1	1:07	UGA	Musa Smith 40 yard run (Billy Bennett kick)	UGA 14–0
Q2	6:53	UGA	Fred Gibson 58 yard pass from David Greene (Billy Bennett kick)	UGA 21–0
Q2	:30	VAN	M.J. Garrett 8 yard pass from Greg Zolman (Chuck Folino kick)	UGA 21–7
Q2	:05	UGA	Billy Bennett 27 yard field goal	UGA 24–7
Q3	3:23	VAN	Greg Zolman 1 yard run (Chuck Folino kick)	UGA 24–14
Q3	:09	UGA	Terrence Edwards 17 yard pass from David Greene (kick failed)	UGA 30–14

== Roster ==
2001 Georgia Bulldogs football team roster
Players
Coaches
Offense

Pos.	#	Name	Class
OL	70	Kevin Breedlove	Jr
WR	1	Reggie Brown	Fr
WR	8	Terrence Edwards	Jr
OT	71	George Foster	Jr
QB	11	David Greene	Fr
TE	86	Randy McMichael	Sr
OT	78	Jon Stinchcomb	Jr
FB	49	J. T. Wall	Jr

Defense

Pos.	#	Name	Class
LB	45	Boss Bailey	Jr
LB	42	Tony Gilbert	Jr
DB	6	Sean Jones	So
DT	57	Johnathan Sullivan	So
CB	2	Tim Wansley	Sr
MLB	46	Will Witherspoon	Sr

Special teams

Pos.	#	Name	Class

Head coach

- Mark Richt

Coordinators/assistant coaches

Legend

- (C) Team captain
- (S) Suspended
- (I) Ineligible
- Injured
- Redshirt

Roster
