= 2001 SEC Championship Game =

- Conference Championship
- 2001 SEC Championship logo
| Tennessee Volunteers | LSU Tigers |
| (10–1) | (8–3) |
| 20 | 31 |
| Head coach: Phillip Fulmer | Head coach: Nick Saban |
| AP / Coaches / BCS; 2 / 2 / 2 | AP / Coaches / BCS; 21 / 20 / NR |
| | 1 | 2 | 3 | 4 | Total |
|---|---|---|---|---|---|
| Tennessee | 0 | 17 | 0 | 3 | 20 |
| LSU | 7 | 3 | 6 | 15 | 31 |
- Date: December 8, 2001
- Season: 2001
- Stadium: Georgia Dome
- Location: Atlanta, Georgia
- MVP: QB Matt Mauck, LSU
- Favorite: Tennessee by 7
- Referee: Steve Shaw
- Attendance: 74,843

United States TV coverage
- Network: CBS
- Announcers: Verne Lundquist (play-by-play); Todd Blackledge (color); Jill Arrington (sideline)

2001 Southeastern Conference football standings
| | Conf. | | | Overall |
| Team | W | | L | W | | L |
|---|---|---|---|---|---|---|
Eastern Division
| No. 4 Tennessee x | 7 | – | 1 | 11 | – | 2 |
| No. 3 Florida % | 6 | – | 2 | 10 | – | 2 |
| No. 13 South Carolina | 5 | – | 3 | 9 | – | 3 |
| No. 22 Georgia | 5 | – | 3 | 8 | – | 4 |
| Kentucky | 1 | – | 7 | 2 | – | 9 |
| Vanderbilt | 0 | – | 8 | 2 | – | 9 |
Western Division
| No. 7 LSU xy$ | 5 | – | 3 | 10 | – | 3 |
| Auburn x | 5 | – | 3 | 7 | – | 5 |
| Ole Miss | 4 | – | 4 | 7 | – | 4 |
| Alabama | 4 | – | 4 | 7 | – | 5 |
| Arkansas | 4 | – | 4 | 7 | – | 5 |
| Mississippi State | 2 | – | 6 | 3 | – | 8 |
Championship: LSU 31, Tennessee 20
$ – BCS representative as conference champion; % – BCS at-large representative; x – Division champion/co-champions; y – Championship game participant; Rankings from AP Poll

The 2001 SEC Championship Game was won by the LSU Tigers 31–20 over the Tennessee Volunteers. The game was played in the Georgia Dome in Atlanta on December 8, 2001 and was televised to a national audience on CBS. The loss kept Tennessee from a second appearance in the BCS National Championship Game.
