= 2002 Florida Citrus Bowl =

American college football game

2002 Capital One Florida Citrus Bowl
Michigan Wolverines	Tennessee Volunteers
(8–3)	(10–2)
Big Ten	SEC
17	45
Head coach: Lloyd Carr	Head coach: Phillip Fulmer
AP / Coaches; 17 / 15	AP / Coaches / BCS; 8 / 8 / 6
	1	2	3	4	Total
Michigan	0	10	0	7	17
Tennessee	10	14	7	14	45
- Date: January 1, 2002
- Season: 2001
- Stadium: Florida Citrus Bowl
- Location: Orlando, Florida
- MVP: Casey Clausen (Tennessee QB)
- Referee: Dennis Hennigan (Big East)
- Attendance: 59,653

United States TV coverage
- Network: ABC
- Announcers: Sean McDonough (play–by–play); Ed Cunningham (color); Leslie Gudel (sideline)

The 2002 Florida Citrus Bowl was a college football bowl game held on January 1, 2002 at the Florida Citrus Bowl in Orlando, Florida. The Tennessee Volunteers, champions of the Southeastern Conference's Eastern Division, defeated the Michigan Wolverines, second-place finishers in the Big Ten Conference, 45–17. Tennessee quarterback Casey Clausen was named the game's MVP. This was the last Citrus Bowl before the game was renamed the Capital One Bowl.
