= 2001 Auburn Tigers football team =

American college football season

2001 Auburn Tigers football

SEC Western Division co-champion

Peach Bowl, L 10–16 vs. North Carolina
- Conference: Southeastern Conference
- Western Division
- Record: 7–5 (5–3 SEC)
- Head coach: Tommy Tuberville (3rd season)
- Offensive coordinator: Noel Mazzone (3rd season)
- Offensive scheme: Pro-style
- Defensive coordinator: John Lovett (3rd season)
- Base defense: Multiple 4–3
- Home stadium: Jordan–Hare Stadium

2001 Southeastern Conference football standings
	Conf.			Overall
Team	W		L	W		L
Eastern Division
No. 4 Tennessee x	7	–	1	11	–	2
No. 3 Florida %	6	–	2	10	–	2
No. 13 South Carolina	5	–	3	9	–	3
No. 22 Georgia	5	–	3	8	–	4
Kentucky	1	–	7	2	–	9
Vanderbilt	0	–	8	2	–	9
Western Division
No. 7 LSU xy$	5	–	3	10	–	3
Auburn x	5	–	3	7	–	5
Ole Miss	4	–	4	7	–	4
Alabama	4	–	4	7	–	5
Arkansas	4	–	4	7	–	5
Mississippi State	2	–	6	3	–	8
Championship: LSU 31, Tennessee 20
$ – BCS representative as conference champion; % – BCS at-large representative; x – Division champion/co-champions; y – Championship game participant; Rankings from AP Poll

The 2001 Auburn Tigers football team represented Auburn University in the 2001 NCAA Division I-A football season. They posted a 7–5 record, including a record of 5–3 in the Southeastern Conference. The Tigers finished the season tied for first place in the SEC West Division, but did not qualify for the SEC Championship Game because of tie-breakers.

Auburn's season was highlighted by a 23–20 victory over #1-ranked Florida on October 13. On November 10, the Tigers beat rival Georgia, 24–17, led by running back Carnell Williams, who carried the ball 41 times and made several receptions, one on a long screen pass to set up his game-winning touchdown run. Auburn was scheduled to play LSU on September 15, but as a result of the September 11, 2001 attacks, the game was postponed until December 1. This was the first time that Auburn did not end its regular season schedule against arch rival Alabama in the Iron Bowl since the series was resumed in 1948 after a 41-year hiatus.

While Auburn was unranked at the end of the season in both major polls, several BCS computer rating systems such as Massey (#23), Sagarin (#24) and The Seattle Times (#24) included the Tigers in their final top 25 rankings.

== Schedule ==
Date	Time	Opponent	Rank	Site	TV	Result	Attendance
September 1	1:30 pm	Ball State*		Jordan–Hare Stadium; Auburn, Alabama	PPV	W 30–0	82,376
September 8	2:30 pm	Ole Miss		Jordan–Hare Stadium; Auburn, Alabama (rivalry)	JPS	W 27–21	86,063
September 22	6:45 pm	at Syracuse*		Carrier Dome; Syracuse, New York	ESPN	L 14–31	43,403
September 29	6:00 pm	at Vanderbilt		Vanderbilt Stadium; Nashville, Tennessee	PPV	W 24–21	39,366
October 6	6:00 pm	Mississippi State		Jordan–Hare Stadium; Auburn, Alabama	ESPN2	W 16–14	86,063
October 13	6:45 pm	No. 1 Florida		Jordan–Hare Stadium; Auburn, Alabama (rivalry)	ESPN	W 23–20	86,063
October 20	1:00 pm	Louisiana Tech*^{†}	No. 20	Jordan–Hare Stadium; Auburn, Alabama	PPV	W 48–41 ^{OT}	86,063
October 27	11:30 am	at Arkansas	No. 17	Donald W. Reynolds Razorback Stadium; Fayetteville, Arkansas	JPS	L 17–42	67,213
November 10	2:30 pm	at No. 19 Georgia	No. 24	Sanford Stadium; Athens, Georgia (Deep South's Oldest Rivalry)	CBS	W 24–17	86,520
November 17	2:30 pm	Alabama	No. 17	Jordan–Hare Stadium; Auburn, Alabama (Iron Bowl)	CBS	L 7–31	86,063
December 1	6:45 pm	at No. 22 LSU	No. 25	Tiger Stadium; Baton Rouge, Louisiana (Tiger Bowl)	ESPN	L 14–27	92,141
December 31	7:30 pm	vs. North Carolina*		Georgia Dome; Atlanta (Peach Bowl)	ESPN	L 10–16	71,827
*Non-conference game; ^{†}Homecoming; Rankings from AP Poll released prior to the game; All times are in Central time

== Roster ==
2001 Auburn Tigers football team roster
Players
Coaches
Offense

Pos.	#	Name	Class
WR	2	Tim Carter	Sr
QB	17	Jason Campbell	Fr
OT	73	Kendall Simmons	Sr

Defense

Pos.	#	Name	Class
DB	5	Travaris Robinson	Jr
CB	14	Carlos Rogers	Fr
LB	52	Mark Brown	Jr
LB	54	Dontarrious Thomas	So
DE	82	Reggie Torbor	So

Special teams

Pos.	#	Name	Class

Head coach

- Tommy Tuberville

Coordinators/assistant coaches

Legend

- (C) Team captain
- (S) Suspended
- (I) Ineligible
- Injured
- Redshirt

Roster

== Game summaries ==
=== Florida ===
Team	1	2	3	4	Total
Florida	3	3	7	7	20
• Auburn	3	7	0	13	23

- Date: October 13
- Location: Jordan–Hare Stadium, Auburn, Alabama
- Game attendance: 86,063
- Television network: ESPN

Scoring summary
Q1	11:24	FLA	Chandler 45 yard field goal	FLA 3–0
Q1	9:39	AUB	Duval 45 yard field goal	Tie 3–3
Q2	11:03	AUB	Cobb 1 yard run (Duval kick)	AUB 10–3
Q2	:21	FLA	Chandler 32 yard field goal	AUB 10–6
Q3	7:48	FLA	Caldwell 20 yard pass from Grossman (Chandler kick)	FLA 13–10
Q4	14:55	AUB	Butler 2 yard run (Duval kick)	AUB 17–13
Q4	12:27	AUB	Duval 32 yard field goal	AUB 20–13
Q4	12:09	FLA	Gaffney 80 yard pass from Grossman (Chandler kick)	Tie 20–20
Q4	:10	AUB	Duval 44 yard field goal	AUB 23–20

- Almost seven years earlier, Auburn had defeated #1 Florida and snapped their home win streak.

=== Georgia ===
#24 Auburn at #19 Georgia

Team	1	2	3	4	Total
• Auburn	7	0	10	7	24
Georgia	7	7	0	3	17

- Date: November 10
- Location: Sanford Stadium, Athens, Georgia
- Game attendance: 86,520
- Source: Sports Illustrated

Scoring summary
1	UGA	Gibson 67 yard pass from Greene (Bennett kick)	UGA 7-0
1	AUB	C. Williams 1 yard run (Duval kick)	Tied 7-7
2	UGA	Edwards 56 yard pass from Greene (Bennett kick)	UGA 14-7
3	AUB	R. Johnson 3 yard pass from Cobb (Duval kick)	Tied 14-14
3	AUB	Duval 32 yard field goal	AUB 17-14
4	UGA	Bennett 43 yard field goal	Tied 17-17
4	AUB	C. Wiliams 1 yard run (Duval kick)	AUB 24-17

- AUB: Cadillac Williams 41 Rush, 167 Yds
