= 2001 Illinois Fighting Illini football team =

American college football season

2001 Illinois Fighting Illini football

Big Ten champion

Sugar Bowl, L 34–47 vs. LSU
- Conference: Big Ten Conference

Ranking
- Coaches: No. 12
- AP: No. 12
- Record: 10–2 (7–1 Big Ten)
- Head coach: Ron Turner (5th season)
- Offensive scheme: Pro-style
- Defensive coordinator: Mike Cassity (1st season)
- Base defense: 4–3
- Home stadium: Memorial Stadium

2001 Big Ten Conference football standings
	Conf.			Overall
Team	W		L	W		L
No. 12 Illinois $	7	–	1	10	–	2
No. 20 Michigan	6	–	2	8	–	4
Ohio State	5	–	3	7	–	5
Iowa	4	–	4	7	–	5
Purdue	4	–	4	6	–	6
Penn State	4	–	4	5	–	6
Indiana	4	–	4	5	–	6
Michigan State	3	–	5	7	–	5
Wisconsin	3	–	5	5	–	7
Minnesota	2	–	6	4	–	7
Northwestern	2	–	6	4	–	7
$ – BCS representative as conference champion; Rankings from AP Poll

The 2001 Illinois Fighting Illini football team was an American football team that represented the University of Illinois at Urbana-Champaign as a member of the Big Ten Conference during the 2001 NCAA Division I-A football season. In their fifth season under head coach Ron Turner, the Illini compiled a 10–2 record (7–1 in conference games), won the Big Ten championship, and outscored opponents by a total of 356 to 238. They were invited to the 2002 Sugar Bowl, losing to LSU, 47–34. The Illini were ranked No. 7 at the end of the regular season, but dropped to No. 12 in the final poll issued after the bowl games.

Senior quarterback Kurt Kittner led the Big Ten with 2,944 passing yards, 23 passing touchdowns, and 13 interceptions. He completed 207 of 374 passes for a 55.3% completion percentage. The team's other statistical leaders included wide receiver Brandon Lloyd (60 receptions for 1,006 yards), running back Antoineo Harris (626 rushing yards), and kicker Peter Christofilakos (61 points, 12 of 13 field goals, 25 of 25 extra points).

Ten Illinois players were recognized on the 2001 All-Big Ten Conference football team: guard Jay Kulaga (Coaches-1, Media-1); tackle Tony Pashos (Coaches-1, Media-1); Kittner at quarterback (Coaches-2, Media-2); Lloyd at receiver (Coaches-2, Media-2); center Luke Butkus (Coaches-2, Media-2); linebacker Jerry Schumacher (Media-2); defensive backs Bobby Jackson (Coaches-2), Christian Morton (Media-2), and Eugene Wilson; and kicker Christofilakos (Media-2).

The team played its home games at Memorial Stadium in Champaign, Illinois.

== Schedule ==
Date	Time	Opponent	Rank	Site	TV	Result	Attendance	Source
September 1	2:30 pm	at California*		California Memorial Stadium; Berkeley, CA	FSN	W 44–17	38,160	
September 8	11:00 am	Northern Illinois*		Memorial Stadium; Champaign, IL	ESPN Plus	W 17–12	45,674	
September 22	11:00 am	No. 25 Louisville*		Memorial Stadium; Champaign, IL	ESPN	W 34–10	43,232	
September 29	2:30 pm	at No. 17 Michigan	No. 22	Michigan Stadium; Ann Arbor, MI (rivalry)	ABC	L 20–45	107,085	
October 6	11:00 am	Minnesota		Memorial Stadium; Champaign, IL	ESPN Plus	W 32–14	53,225	
October 13	12:00 pm	at Indiana		Memorial Stadium; Bloomington, Indiana (rivalry)		W 35–14	31,116	
October 20	11:00 am	Wisconsin^{†}		Memorial Stadium; Champaign, IL	ESPN	W 42–35	70,904	
November 3	11:00 am	at No. 20 Purdue	No. 21	Ross–Ade Stadium; West Lafayette, IN (rivalry)	ESPN	W 38–13	61,568	
November 10	2:30 pm	Penn State	No. 15	Memorial Stadium; Champaign, IL	ABC	W 33–28	70,904	
November 17	11:00 am	at No. 25 Ohio State	No. 12	Ohio Stadium; Columbus, OH (Illibuck)	ESPN	W 34–22	104,407	
November 22	11:00 am	Northwestern	No. 10	Memorial Stadium; Champaign, IL (rivalry)	ESPN2	W 34–28	45,755	
January 1	7:30 pm	vs. No. 12 LSU*	No. 7	Louisiana Superdome; New Orleans, LA (Sugar Bowl)	ABC	L 34–47	77,688	
*Non-conference game; ^{†}Homecoming; Rankings from AP Poll released prior to the game; All times are in Central time

== Roster ==
2001 Illinois Fighting Illini football team roster
Players
Coaches
Offense

Pos.	#	Name	Class
C	71	Luke Butkus	Sr
FB	24	Carey Davis	So
G	64	David Diehl	Jr
QB	15	Kurt Kittner	Sr
WR	17	Greg Lewis	Jr
WR	6	Brandon Lloyd	Sr
WR	86	Aaron Moorehead	Jr
G	79	Tony Pashos	Sr
C	75	Duke Preston	Fr
QB/RB	18	Walter Young	Jr

Defense

Pos.	#	Name	Class
DT	96	Brandon Moore	Sr
LB	44	Matt Sinclair	Fr
DB	28	Eugene Wilson	Jr

Special teams

Pos.	#	Name	Class
K	22	Peter Christofilakos	So
P	37	Steve Weatherford	Fr

Head coach

- Ron Turner

Coordinators/assistant coaches

Legend

- (C) Team captain
- (S) Suspended
- (I) Ineligible
- Injured
- Redshirt

Roster
