= Carlos Hall =

American football player (born 1979)

No. 92, 97
- Position: Defensive end

Personal information
- Born: January 16, 1979 (age 47); Marianna, Arkansas, U.S.
- Listed height: 6 ft 4 in (1.93 m)
- Listed weight: 261 lb (118 kg)

Career information
- College: Arkansas
- NFL draft: 2002: 7th round, 240th overall pick

Career history
- Tennessee Titans (2002–2004); Kansas City Chiefs (2005); Denver Broncos (2007)*
- * Offseason or practice squad member only

Awards and highlights
- Second-team All-SEC (2001)

Career NFL statistics
- Total tackles: 134
- Sacks: 14.5
- Forced fumbles: 3
- Fumble recoveries: 2
- Stats at Pro Football Reference

Carlos DeShaun Hall (born January 16, 1979) is an American former professional football player who was a defensive end in the National Football League (NFL). He was selected 240th overall by the Tennessee Titans in the seventh round of the 2002 NFL draft. He also played for the Kansas City Chiefs and Denver Broncos. He played college football for the Arkansas Razorbacks.

== College career ==
Hall started 32 of 41 career games at the University of Arkansas, where he was named honorable mention All-American by Street & Smith and second-team All-SEC by the Associated Press as senior, recording 49 tackles, five tackles for loss, two forced fumbles, one fumble recovery and one sack.

During his freshman season in 1998, Hall helped Arkansas finish 9-3 and win a share of the SEC West Division championship. As a sophomore in 1999, he helped the Razorbacks beat Texas in the 2000 Cotton Bowl Classic. His junior year in 2000, Arkansas beat ranked conference foes Mississippi State and LSU in consecutive weeks to gain bowl eligibility. His senior season would end at the Cotton Bowl as well, but Arkansas lost to Oklahoma in a hard-fought defensive game, 10–3.

Hall is best known for blocking a field goal attempt by the #9 South Carolina Gamecocks during his senior year. The game was played at War Memorial Stadium in Little Rock, AR on October 13, 2001. Arkansas was leading 10–7 with 53 seconds left in the fourth quarter, when Gamecock head coach Lou Holtz called for a field goal attempt on fourth down to tie the game and send it to overtime. As the ball was snapped, Hall leapt at the line of scrimmage and blocked the kick with both hands. Arkansas recovered the ball and ran the clock out for the victory. It was South Carolina's first loss of the season.

== Personal life ==
His son Keiondre Hall is a defensive end at Pittsburg State University.
