= 2001 South Carolina Gamecocks football team =

American college football season

2001 South Carolina Gamecocks football

Outback Bowl champion

Outback Bowl, W 31–28 vs. Ohio State
- Conference: Southeastern Conference
- Eastern Division

Ranking
- Coaches: No. 13
- AP: No. 13
- Record: 9–3 (5–3 SEC)
- Head coach: Lou Holtz (3rd season)
- Offensive coordinator: Skip Holtz (3rd season)
- Offensive scheme: Spread
- Defensive coordinator: Charlie Strong (3rd season)
- Base defense: 3–3–5
- Home stadium: Williams-Brice Stadium

2001 Southeastern Conference football standings
	Conf.			Overall
Team	W		L	W		L
Eastern Division
No. 4 Tennessee x	7	–	1	11	–	2
No. 3 Florida %	6	–	2	10	–	2
No. 13 South Carolina	5	–	3	9	–	3
No. 22 Georgia	5	–	3	8	–	4
Kentucky	1	–	7	2	–	9
Vanderbilt	0	–	8	2	–	9
Western Division
No. 7 LSU xy$	5	–	3	10	–	3
Auburn x	5	–	3	7	–	5
Ole Miss	4	–	4	7	–	4
Alabama	4	–	4	7	–	5
Arkansas	4	–	4	7	–	5
Mississippi State	2	–	6	3	–	8
Championship: LSU 31, Tennessee 20
$ – BCS representative as conference champion; % – BCS at-large representative; x – Division champion/co-champions; y – Championship game participant; Rankings from AP Poll

The 2001 South Carolina Gamecocks football team represented the University of South Carolina in the Southeastern Conference (SEC) during the 2001 NCAA Division I-A football season. The Gamecocks were led by Lou Holtz in his third season as head coach, and played their home games in Williams–Brice Stadium in Columbia, South Carolina.

South Carolina followed up one of the biggest turnarounds in college football history in 2000 with another successful season in 2001. South Carolina's game on September 20 against No. 17 Mississippi State was the first NCAA Division I-A game played following the September 11 attacks. Just over a week later, South Carolina defeated Alabama for the first time in program history, resulting in fans rushing the field. By early October, the Gamecocks were 5–0 and ranked No. 9 in the AP poll, their highest ranking since 1988. The Gamecocks defeated No. 22 Ohio State in the Outback Bowl for the second consecutive year, finishing the season with a record of 9–3 and ranked No. 13 in both the AP Poll and the Coaches Poll. The final win total and final ranking were both the second highest in school history until then.

With a 17–7 record, the 2000 and 2001 seasons represented the best two-year mark in program history until then. Holtz became the first Gamecock head football coach to win two bowl games.

== Schedule ==
The November 10 game played host to ESPN's College Gameday, a first for the program. A game against Bowling Green was scheduled for September 15, but was canceled in the wake of the September 11 attacks. The game was never played. South Carolina added Wofford to the schedule to replace the open date originally scheduled for November 3.

Date	Time	Opponent	Rank	Site	TV	Result	Attendance	Source
September 1	7:00 pm	Boise State*	No. 21	Williams–Brice Stadium; Columbia SC	CSS	W 32–13	83,019	
September 8	7:45 pm	at No. 25 Georgia	No. 21	Sanford Stadium; Athens, GA (rivalry)	ESPN	W 14–9	86,520	
September 20	7:30 pm	at No. 17 Mississippi State	No. 18	Scott Field; Starkville, MS	ESPN	W 16–14	43,579	
September 29	12:30 pm	Alabama	No. 15	Williams–Brice Stadium; Columbia, SC	JPS	W 37–36	84,100	
October 6	1:00 pm	Kentucky	No. 13	Williams–Brice Stadium; Columbia, SC	PPV	W 42–6	80,250	
October 13	3:30 pm	at Arkansas	No. 9	War Memorial Stadium; Little Rock, AR	CBS	L 7–10	53,514	
October 20	1:00 pm	Vanderbilt	No. 16	Williams–Brice Stadium; Columbia, SC	CSS	W 46–14	83,104	
October 27	6:00 pm	at No. 9 Tennessee	No. 12	Neyland Stadium; Knoxville, TN (rivalry)	ESPN2	L 10–17	107,530	
November 3	1:00 pm	Wofford*	No. 17	Williams–Brice Stadium; Columbia, SC		W 38–14	77,922	
November 10	7:45 pm	No. 4 Florida	No. 14	Williams–Brice Stadium; Columbia, SC (College GameDay)	ESPN	L 17–54	84,900	
November 17	12:30 pm	Clemson*	No. 22	Williams–Brice Stadium; Columbia, SC (rivalry)	JPS	W 20–15	85,000	
January 1	11:00 am	vs. No. 22 Ohio State*	No. 14	Raymond James Stadium; Tampa, FL (Outback Bowl)	ESPN	W 31–28	66,249	
*Non-conference game; Rankings from AP Poll released prior to the game; All times are in Eastern time

== Rankings ==
Ranking movements Legend: ██ Increase in ranking ██ Decrease in ranking — = Not ranked
	Week																
Poll	Pre	1	2	3	4	5	6	7	8	9	10	11	12	13	14	15	Final
AP	21	21	21	18	15	13	9	16	12	17	14	22	18	15	14	14	13
Coaches	22	22	21	20	16	12	9	16	14	20	15	22	18	15	14	14	13
BCS	Not released								15	—	—	—	—	—	15	14	Not released

== Roster ==
2001 South Carolina Gamecocks football team roster
Players
Coaches
Offense

Pos.	#	Name	Class
RB	4	Andrew Pinnock	Jr
QB	9	Corey Jenkins	Jr
QB		Erik Kimrey	Sr

Defense

Pos.	#	Name	Class
NT	57	Langston Moore	Jr

Special teams

Pos.	#	Name	Class

Head coach

- Lou Holtz

Coordinators/assistant coaches

- Oliver Pough
  (Running backs coach)
- John Gutekunst
  (Defensive backs coach)

Legend

- (C) Team captain
- (S) Suspended
- (I) Ineligible
- Injured
- Redshirt
