= 2001 Tennessee Volunteers football team =

American college football season

2001 Tennessee Volunteers football

SEC Eastern Division champion Citrus Bowl champion

SEC Championship Game, L 20–31 vs. LSU

Florida Citrus Bowl, W 45–17 vs. Michigan
- Conference: Southeastern Conference
- Eastern Division

Ranking
- Coaches: No. 4
- AP: No. 4
- Record: 11–2 (7–1 SEC)
- Head coach: Phillip Fulmer (9th season)
- Offensive coordinator: Randy Sanders (3rd season)
- Offensive scheme: Pro-style
- Defensive coordinator: John Chavis (7th season)
- Base defense: Multiple 4–3
- Home stadium: Neyland Stadium

2001 Southeastern Conference football standings
	Conf.			Overall
Team	W		L	W		L
Eastern Division
No. 4 Tennessee x	7	–	1	11	–	2
No. 3 Florida %	6	–	2	10	–	2
No. 13 South Carolina	5	–	3	9	–	3
No. 22 Georgia	5	–	3	8	–	4
Kentucky	1	–	7	2	–	9
Vanderbilt	0	–	8	2	–	9
Western Division
No. 7 LSU xy$	5	–	3	10	–	3
Auburn x	5	–	3	7	–	5
Ole Miss	4	–	4	7	–	4
Alabama	4	–	4	7	–	5
Arkansas	4	–	4	7	–	5
Mississippi State	2	–	6	3	–	8
Championship: LSU 31, Tennessee 20
$ – BCS representative as conference champion; % – BCS at-large representative; x – Division champion/co-champions; y – Championship game participant; Rankings from AP Poll

The 2001 Tennessee Volunteers football team represented the University of Tennessee in the 2001 NCAA Division I-A football season. The team was coached by Phillip Fulmer. The Vols played their home games in Neyland Stadium and competed in the Eastern Division of the Southeastern Conference (SEC). The Vols finished the season 10–2, 7–1 in SEC play, and won the Florida Citrus Bowl 45–17 over Michigan. Tennessee had National Championship aspirations late in the season. A 31–20 loss in the SEC Championship to LSU ended any chance of a National Championship for the Volunteers.

== Schedule ==
Date	Time	Opponent	Rank	Site	TV	Result	Attendance
September 1	4:00 pm	Syracuse*	No. 8	Neyland Stadium; Knoxville, Tennessee	ESPN2	W 33–9	107,725
September 8	9:00 pm	at Arkansas	No. 8	Razorback Stadium; Fayetteville, Arkansas	ESPN2	W 13–3	70,470
September 29	7:45 pm	No. 14 LSU	No. 7	Neyland Stadium; Knoxville, Tennessee	ESPN	W 26–18	108,472
October 6	12:00 pm	Georgia	No. 6	Neyland Stadium; Knoxville, Tennessee (rivalry)	CBS	L 24–26	107,592
October 20	3:30 pm	at Alabama	No. 11	Bryant–Denny Stadium; Tuscaloosa, Alabama (Third Saturday in October)	CBS	W 35–24	83,818
October 27	7:45 pm	No. 12 South Carolina	No. 9	Neyland Stadium; Knoxville, Tennessee (rivalry)	ESPN2	W 17–10	107,530
November 3	2:30 pm	at Notre Dame*	No. 7	Notre Dame Stadium; Notre Dame, Indiana	NBC	W 28–18	80,795
November 10	2:00 pm	Memphis*^{†}	No. 6	Neyland Stadium; Knoxville, Tennessee	PPV	W 49–28	107,221
November 17	12:30 pm	at Kentucky	No. 6	Commonwealth Stadium; Lexington, Kentucky (Battle for the Barrel)	JPS	W 38–35	69,109
November 24	3:30 pm	Vanderbilt	No. 7	Neyland Stadium; Knoxville, Tennessee (rivalry)	CBS	W 38–0	102,519
December 1*	3:30 pm	at No. 2 Florida	No. 5	Ben Hill Griffin Stadium; Gainesville, Florida (Third Saturday in September) (College GameDay)	CBS	W 34–32	85,771
December 8	8:00 pm	vs. No. 21 LSU	No. 2	Georgia Dome; Atlanta (SEC Championship Game)	CBS	L 20–31	74,843
January 1	1:00 pm	vs. No. 17 Michigan*	No. 8	Florida Citrus Bowl; Orlando, Florida (2002 Florida Citrus Bowl)	ABC	W 45–17	59,693
*Non-conference game; ^{†}Homecoming; Rankings from AP Poll released prior to the game; All times are in Eastern time

- Originally scheduled for September 15, the UT-UF game (along with all sporting events that weekend) was postponed to a later date due to the September 11th Attacks.

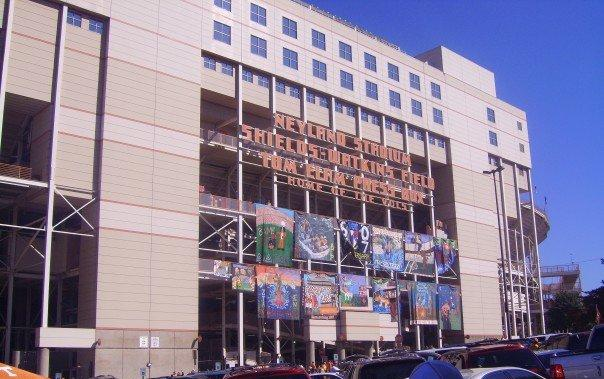
Neyland Stadium hosted six Tennessee home games in 2001.

== Roster ==
2001 Tennessee Volunteers football team roster
Players
Coaches
Offense

Pos.	#	Name	Class
QB	7	Casey Clausen	So
WR	4	Donté Stallworth	Jr
TE	1	Jason Witten	Jr

Defense

Pos.	#	Name	Class
DT	92	Albert Haynesworth	Jr
DT	98	John Henderson	Jr
DE	56	Bernard Jackson	Sr
DE	90	Will Overstreet	Sr

Special teams

Pos.	#	Name	Class
P	47	Dustin Colquitt	Fr

Head coach

- Phillip Fulmer

Coordinators/assistant coaches

- Randy Sanders – Offensive coordinator/quarterbacks
- Woody McCorvey – Running backs
- Pat Washington – Wide receivers
- Doug Marrone – Tight ends/offensive tackles
- Mike Barry – Interior offensive line
- John Chavis – Defensive coordinator/linebackers
- Dan Brooks – Defensive line/recruiting coordinator
- Larry Slade – Defensive backs
- Steve Caldwell – Special teams/defensive ends
- Shawn Quinn – Graduate assistant

Legend

- (C) Team captain
- (S) Suspended
- (I) Ineligible
- Injured
- Redshirt

Roster

== 2002 NFL draft ==
The 2002 NFL draft was held on April 20–21, 2002 at The Theater at Madison Square Garden in New York City. Tennessee had ten players selected. The 2002 NFL draft marked the most players Tennessee ever had selected in a single draft.

Player	Position	Round	Pick	NFL team
John Henderson	DT	1st	9	Jacksonville Jaguars
Donté Stallworth	WR	1st	13	New Orleans Saints
Albert Haynesworth	DT	1st	15	Tennessee Titans
Fred Weary	G	3rd	66	Houston Texans
Will Overstreet	DE	3rd	80	Atlanta Falcons
Travis Stephens	RB	4th	119	Tampa Bay Buccaneers
Andre Lott	CB	5th	129	Washington Redskins
Reggie Coleman	T	6th	192	Washington Redskins
Teddy Gaines	CB	7th	256	San Francisco 49ers
Dominique Stevenson	LB	7th	260	Buffalo Bills
