= 2001 LSU Tigers football team =

American college football season

2001 LSU Tigers football

SEC champion SEC Western Division co-champion Sugar Bowl champion

SEC Championship Game, W 31–20 vs. Tennessee

Sugar Bowl, W 47–34 vs. Illinois
- Conference: Southeastern Conference
- Western Division

Ranking
- Coaches: No. 8
- AP: No. 7
- Record: 10–3 (5–3 SEC)
- Head coach: Nick Saban (2nd season)
- Offensive coordinator: Jimbo Fisher (2nd season)
- Offensive scheme: Pro-style
- Defensive coordinator: Gary Gibbs (1st season)
- Base defense: 4–3
- Home stadium: Tiger Stadium

2001 Southeastern Conference football standings
	Conf.			Overall
Team	W		L	W		L
Eastern Division
No. 4 Tennessee x	7	–	1	11	–	2
No. 3 Florida %	6	–	2	10	–	2
No. 13 South Carolina	5	–	3	9	–	3
No. 22 Georgia	5	–	3	8	–	4
Kentucky	1	–	7	2	–	9
Vanderbilt	0	–	8	2	–	9
Western Division
No. 7 LSU xy$	5	–	3	10	–	3
Auburn x	5	–	3	7	–	5
Ole Miss	4	–	4	7	–	4
Alabama	4	–	4	7	–	5
Arkansas	4	–	4	7	–	5
Mississippi State	2	–	6	3	–	8
Championship: LSU 31, Tennessee 20
$ – BCS representative as conference champion; % – BCS at-large representative; x – Division champion/co-champions; y – Championship game participant; Rankings from AP Poll

The 2001 LSU Tigers football team represented Louisiana State University in the 2001 NCAA Division I-A football season. Coached by Nick Saban, the Tigers played their home games at Tiger Stadium in Baton Rouge, Louisiana. LSU went 10–3 and won the SEC West and represented the division in the 2001 SEC Championship Game for the first time. After a 31–20 upset of favored Tennessee, LSU played in the 2002 Sugar Bowl in New Orleans, Louisiana, and defeated yet another higher ranked opponent, Illinois, 47–34.

== Schedule ==
Date	Time	Opponent	Rank	Site	TV	Result	Attendance	Source
September 1	7:00 p.m.	Tulane*	No. 14	Tiger Stadium; Baton Rouge, LA (Battle for the Rag)	PPV	W 48–17	91,782	
September 8	7:00 p.m.	Utah State*	No. 13	Tiger Stadium; Baton Rouge, LA		W 31–14	87,756	
September 29	7:45 p.m.	at No. 7 Tennessee	No. 14	Neyland Stadium; Knoxville, TN	ESPN	L 18–26	108,472	
October 6	2:30 p.m.	No. 2 Florida	No. 18	Tiger Stadium; Baton Rouge, LA (rivalry)	CBS	L 15–44	92,010	
October 13	6:00 p.m.	at Kentucky		Commonwealth Stadium; Lexington, KY	PPV	W 29–25	52,471	
October 20	8:00 p.m.	at Mississippi State		Davis Wade Stadium; Starkville, MS (rivalry)	ESPN2	W 42–0	45,514	
October 27	8:00 p.m.	Ole Miss		Tiger Stadium; Baton Rouge, LA (Magnolia Bowl)	ESPN2	L 24–35	91,941	
November 3	2:30 p.m.	at Alabama		Bryant–Denny Stadium; Tuscaloosa, AL (rivalry)	CBS	W 35–21	83,818	
November 10	7:00 p.m.	Middle Tennessee*^{†}		Tiger Stadium; Baton Rouge, LA	PPV	W 30–14	88,249	
November 23	1:30 p.m.	No. 24 Arkansas		Tiger Stadium; Baton Rouge, LA (rivalry)	CBS	W 41–38	89,560	
December 1	6:45 p.m.	No. 25 Auburn	No. 22	Tiger Stadium; Baton Rouge, LA (rivalry)	ESPN	W 27–14	92,141	
December 8	7:00 p.m.	vs. No. 2 Tennessee	No. 21	Georgia Dome; Atlanta, GA (SEC Championship Game)	CBS	W 31–20	74,843	
January 1, 2002	7:30 p.m.	vs. No. 7 Illinois*	No. 12	Louisiana Superdome; New Orleans, LA (Sugar Bowl)	ABC	W 47–34	77,688	
*Non-conference game; ^{†}Homecoming; Rankings from AP Poll released prior to the game; All times are in Central time

== Roster ==
2001 LSU Tigers football team roster
Players
Coaches
Offense

Pos.	#	Name	Class
QB	6	Rohan Davey	Sr
RB	22	LaBrandon Toefield	Jr
WR	25	Josh Reed	Sr
RB	31	Domanick Davis	Jr
TE	47	Eric Edwards	So
G	73	Rob Sale	Jr
TE	86	Robert Royal	Sr

Defense

Pos.	#	Name	Class
DB	2	Ryan Clark	Sr
LB	7	Trev Faulk	Sr
DT	95	Howard Green	Sr
DE	59	Jarvis Green	Sr
LB	11	Bradie James	Jr
CB	13	Corey Webster	Fr

Special teams

Pos.	#	Name	Class

Head coach

- Nick Saban

Coordinators/assistant coaches

- Offensive coordinator/quarterbacks – Jimbo Fisher
- Running backs/special teams coordinator – Michael Haywood
- Offensive line – George Yarno
- Wide receivers – Stan Hixon
- Tight ends – Derek Dooley
- Defensive coordinator – Gary Gibbs
- Linebackers – Will Muschamp
- Defensive line – Pete Jenkins
- Defensive backs – Charlie Harbison
- Graduate assistant – Adam Gase
- Graduate assistant – Scott Cochran
- Offensive graduate assistant – Jay Rodgers

Legend

- (C) Team captain
- (S) Suspended
- (I) Ineligible
- Injured
- Redshirt

Roster

== LSU Tigers in the 2002 NFL draft ==
Player	Position	Round	Pick	Overall	NFL team
Josh Reed	Wide Receiver	2	4	36	Buffalo Bills
Rohan Davey	Quarterback	4	19	117	New England Patriots
Jarvis Green	Defensive End	4	28	126	New England Patriots
Robert Royal	Tight end	5	25	160	Washington Redskins
Howard Green	Defensive tackle	6	18	190	Houston Texans

https://www.pro-football-reference.com/draft/2002.htm
