= 2001 Motor City Bowl =

Cincinnati Bearcats	Toledo Rockets
(7–4)	(9–2)
C-USA	MAC
16	23
Head coach: Rick Minter	Head coach: Tom Amstutz
	AP / Coaches / BCS; 25 / NR / NR
	1	2	3	4	Total
Cincinnati	0	13	0	3	16
Toledo	3	0	10	10	23
- Date: December 29, 2001
- Season: 2001
- Stadium: Pontiac Silverdome
- Location: Pontiac, Michigan
- MVP: Chester Taylor (RB, Toledo)
- Favorite: Toledo by 4½
- Attendance: 44,164

United States TV coverage
- Network: ESPN
- Announcers: Pam Ward (Play by Play); Dean Blevins (Analyst); Alex Flanagan (Sideline)

The 2001 Motor City Bowl was a post-season college football bowl game part of 2001–02 NCAA football bowl games in which the Toledo Rockets of the MAC defeated the Cincinnati Bearcats of the Conference USA 23–16. It was played on December 29, 2001, at the Pontiac Silverdome in Pontiac, Michigan. This was the last Bowl game that was played in the Pontiac Silverdome.

== Teams ==
=== Cincinnati Bearcats ===
The Bearcats were C-USA runners-up. The Bearcats start the season with a loss to Purdue. They won against Louisiana–Monroe, and also won against Conference USA teams Army, Tulane, UAB, Houston, Connecticut, and Memphis. The Bearcats lost to Louisville, and against East Carolina. They also lost to Miami (OH). The Bearcats had lost its previous Motor City Bowl in 2000.

=== Toledo Rockets ===
The Rockets upset Minnesota to start the season. They won against Temple, Navy, and also won against Mid–American Conference teams Central Michigan, Northern Illinois, Ohio, Western Michigan, and Eastern Michigan. The Rockets lost to Ball State, and against rival Bowling Green. The Rockets won the MAC West Division co champion and would end up beating Marshall 41–36 in the 2001 MAC Championship Game. This game marked the first time the Rockets appeared in the Motor City Bowl.

== Last couple of minutes ==
Rockets running back Chester Taylor rushed for a bowl record 190 yards on 31 carries and the game-winning touchdown. Cincinnati got the ball back but Toledo safety Andy Boyd knocked a potentially game-tying pass out of the hands of Ray Jackson in the end zone. Taylor was selected as MVP of the game.

== Scoring summary ==
Source.

Scoring summary

Quarter	Time	Drive			Team	Scoring information	Score	
Quarter	Time	Plays	Yards	TOP	Team	Scoring information	Cincinnati	Toledo
1	9:29	10	37	3:34	Toledo	27-yard field goal by Todd France	0	3
2	9:10	7	18	2:13	Cincinnati	29-yard field goal by Jonathan Ruffin	3	3
2	3:37	7	72	1:53	Cincinnati	Tim Walker 28-yard touchdown reception from Gino Guidugli, Jonathan Ruffin kick good	10	3
2	0:00	8	19	2:09	Cincinnati	46-yard field goal by Jonathan Ruffin	13	3
3	11:37	8	55	2:36	Toledo	42-yard field goal by Todd France	13	6
3	1:52	5	80	1:43	Toledo	Tavares Bolden 28-yard touchdown run, Todd France kick good	13	13
4	9:45	15	61	5:06	Toledo	30-yard field goal by Todd France	13	16
4	6:30	9	60	2:22	Cincinnati	25-yard field goal by Jonathan Ruffin	16	16
4	3:23	8	82	3:07	Toledo	Chester Taylor 24-yard touchdown run, Todd France kick good	16	23
"TOP" = time of possession. For other American football terms, see Glossary of American football.							16	23

=== Statistics ===
Statistic	Toledo	Cincinnati
First downs	24	19
Rushes-yards	51–322	20–13
Passing	135	283
Att-Comp-Int	28–14–1	47–29–0
Return yards	34	93
Punts-Avg	4–39	7–49
Fumbles-lost	0–0	1–0
Penalties-yards	8–75	6–48
Time of Possession	34:16	25:44
