= Todd France =

American football player (born 1980)

Profile
- Position: Placekicker

Personal information
- Born: February 13, 1980 (age 46); Toledo, Ohio, U.S.
- Listed height: 6 ft 3 in (1.91 m)
- Listed weight: 200 lb (91 kg)

Career information
- High school: Springfield (Holland, Ohio)
- College: Toledo (1998–2001)
- NFL draft: 2002: undrafted

Career history
- Philadelphia Eagles (2005); Tampa Bay Buccaneers (2005)

Awards and highlights
- First-team All-MAC (2000); Second-team All-MAC (1999)

Career NFL statistics
- Field goals made: 7
- Field goals attempted: 9
- Field goal %: 77.8
- Longest field goal: 44
- Extra points made: 6
- Extra points attempted: 6
- Extra point %: 100
- Stats at Pro Football Reference

Todd M. France (born February 13, 1980, in Toledo, Ohio) is an American former professional football player who was a placekicker in the National Football League (NFL) and Arena Football League (AFL). He played college football for the Toledo Rockets. In the NFL, he kicked for the Tampa Bay Buccaneers and Philadelphia Eagles. In the AFL, he kicked for the Philadelphia Soul, Chicago Rush, Orlando Predators, and New Orleans VooDoo.

== High school ==
At Springfield High School, he was a Division II All-State team member, team MVP, first team All-District and All-Conference, lettered three years in football and volleyball, four years in soccer and two years in basketball.

== College ==
He played college football at the University of Toledo where he majored in Mechanical Engineering. France was a nominee for Lou Groza Award as nation's best placekicker and he was the first UT kicker to make first-team All-MAC since Bruce Nichols in 1988. France helped lead the Rockets to their first bowl game win since 1995 by beating Cincinnati in the 2001 Motor City Bowl.

== Professional football ==
He spent a season with the Rhein Fire of the now-defunct NFL Europa and played in World Bowl XI

== Personal life ==
After professional football, he completed his Master of Science in Mechanical Engineering from the University of Nevada, Las Vegas and his PhD in Architectural Engineering from the University of Toledo. He is currently a professor at Ohio Northern University in Ada, Ohio.

=== College statistics ===
Year	Team	GP	Kicking						
Year	Team	GP	EXM	XPA	XP%	FGM	FGA	FG%	Pts
1998	Toledo	12	28	28	100.0	11	19	57.9	61
1999	Toledo	11	31	32	96.9	18	26	69.2	85
2000	Toledo	11	49	49	100.0	15	19	78.9	94
2001	Toledo	11	44	45	97.8	12	17	70.6	80
Career		45	152	154	98.7	56	81	69.1	320
