= 2001 Youngstown State Penguins football team =

American college football season

2001 Youngstown State Penguins football
- Conference: Gateway Football Conference

Ranking
- Sports Network: No. 15
- Record: 8–3 (5–2 Gateway)
- Head coach: Jon Heacock (1st season)
- Home stadium: Stambaugh Stadium

2001 Gateway Football Conference standings
| | Conf. | | | Overall |
| Team | W | | L | W | | L |
|---|---|---|---|---|---|---|
| No. 4 Northern Iowa $^ | 6 | – | 1 | 11 | – | 3 |
| No. 12 Western Kentucky ^ | 5 | – | 2 | 8 | – | 4 |
| No. 15 Youngstown State | 5 | – | 2 | 8 | – | 3 |
| Western Illinois | 4 | – | 3 | 5 | – | 5 |
| Southwest Missouri State | 3 | – | 4 | 6 | – | 5 |
| Indiana State | 2 | – | 5 | 3 | – | 8 |
| Illinois State | 2 | – | 5 | 2 | – | 9 |
| Southern Illinois | 1 | – | 6 | 1 | – | 10 |
$ – Conference champion; ^ – NCAA Division I-AA playoff participant; Rankings from The Sports Network poll

The 2001 Youngstown State Penguins football team represented Youngstown State University in the 2001 NCAA Division I-AA football season. The team was led by Jon Heacock in his first season as head coach and played its home games at Stambaugh Stadium in Youngstown, Ohio. The Penguins finished the season with an 8–3 record overall and a 5–2 record in Gateway Football Conference games. Youngstown State was ranked No. 15 in The Sports Network's postseason poll of NCAA Division I-AA.

Despite their record, Youngstown State was not selected for the 2001 NCAA Division I-AA playoffs, as the selection committee felt that the team's two wins against Division II programs gave them a weaker resume than other teams with the same record.

== Schedule ==
| Date | Opponent | Rank | Site | Result | Attendance | Source |
|---|---|---|---|---|---|---|
| August 30 | Lock Haven* | No. 8 | Stambaugh Stadium; Youngstown, OH | W 38–7 | | |
| September 8 | Clarion* | No. 5 | Stambaugh Stadium; Youngstown, OH | W 44–0 | 16,019 | |
| September 15 | Toledo* | No. 3 | Glass Bowl; Toledo, OH | Canceled | | |
| September 22 | No. 6 Western Illinois | No. 3 | Stambaugh Stadium; Youngstown, OH | W 41–7 | 19,331 | |
| September 29 | at Northern Iowa | No. 2 | UNI-Dome; Cedar Falls, IA | L 11–30 | 12,518 | |
| October 6 | at Indiana State | No. 9 | Memorial Stadium; Terre Haute, IN | W 35–21 | 3,918 | |
| October 13 | Southwest Missouri State | No. 5 | Stambaugh Stadium; Youngstown, OH | W 41–20 | 14,778 | |
| October 20 | Illinois State^{†} | No. 5 | Stambaugh Stadium; Youngstown, OH | W 44–30 | 19,171 | |
| October 27 | No. 10 Western Kentucky | No. 5 | Stambaugh Stadium; Youngstown, OH | L 14–24 | 16,591 | |
| November 3 | at Southern Illinois | No. 10 | McAndrew Stadium; Carbondale, IL | W 31–7 | 2,090 | |
| November 17 | Elon* | No. 6 | Stambaugh Stadium; Youngstown, OH | W 45–7 | 12,632 | |
| November 24 | at No. 20 (I-A) Marshall* | No. 6 | Marshall University Stadium; Huntington, WV | L 24–38 | 16,041 | |
*Non-conference game; ^{†}Homecoming; Rankings from The Sports Network Poll released prior to the game
