= Tom Amstutz =

American football player and coach (born 1955)

Biographical details
- Born: August 30, 1955 (age 71)

Playing career
- 1974–1976: Toledo

Coaching career (HC unless noted)
- 1977–1980: Toledo (TE/OT)
- 1981–1986: Toledo (DE)
- 1987–1989: Navy (OLB)
- 1990–1993: Toledo (OLB)
- 1994–1998: Toledo (DC)
- 1998–2001: Toledo (AHC/DC)
- 2001–2008: Toledo

Head coaching record
- Overall: 58–41
- Bowls: 2–2

Accomplishments and honors

Championships
- 2 MAC (2001, 2004); 4 MAC West Division (2001, 2002, 2004, 2005)

Awards
- Toledo Hall of Fame (2015)

Tom Amstutz (born August 30, 1955) is an American former football player and coach. He was the head football coach at the University of Toledo from 2001 to 2008, compiling a 58–41 record, including a 39–24 mark in conference play. Known as "Toledo Tom", he is a native of Toledo, Ohio. Amstutz played college football at Toledo from 1974 to 1976. He was a longtime assistant coach at Toledo, from 1977 to 1986 and from 1990 to 2000. From 1987 to 1989, Amstutz served as an assistant coach at the United States Naval Academy.

In 2008, Amstutz's final season at Toledo, the Rockets became the first ever, and to date, only, Mid-American Conference team to defeat the Michigan Wolverines by the score of 13–10. Amstutz served as the radio analyst for Rocket football broadcasts for the 2010 season, over the Rocket Sports Radio Network.

== Head coaching record ==
Year	Team	Overall	Conference	Standing	Bowl/playoffs	Coaches^{#}	AP^{°}
Toledo Rockets (Mid-American Conference) (2001–2008)
2001	Toledo	10–2	5–2	T–1st (West)	W Motor City	22	23
2002	Toledo	9–5	7–1	T–1st (West)	L Motor City		
2003	Toledo	8–4	6–2	T–2nd (West)			
2004	Toledo	9–4	7–1	T–1st (West)	L Motor City		
2005	Toledo	9–3	6–2	T–1st (West)	W GMAC		
2006	Toledo	5–7	3–5	5th (West)			
2007	Toledo	5–7	3–5	5th (West)			
2008	Toledo	3–9	2–6	5th (West)			
Toledo:		58–41	39–24				
Total:		58–41					
National championship Conference title Conference division title or championship game berth
