= 2001 MAC Championship Game =

- Conference Championship
Marshall Thundering Herd	Toledo Rockets
(10–1)	(8–2)
36	41
Head coach: Bob Pruett	Head coach: Tom Amstutz
AP / Coaches / BCS; 20 / 18 / NR
	1	2	3	4	Total
Marshall	23	0	6	7	36
Toledo	0	10	25	6	41
- Date: November 30, 2001
- Season: 2001
- Stadium: Glass Bowl
- Location: Toledo, Ohio
- MVP: RB Chester Taylor (Toledo)
- Favorite: Marshall by 3
- Attendance: 20,025

United States TV coverage
- Network: ESPN
- Announcers: Mark Jones, Chris Spielman, Holly Rowe

The 2001 MAC Championship Game was played on November 30, 2001 at the Glass Bowl in Toledo, Ohio. The game featured the winner of each division of the Mid-American Conference. The game featured the Marshall Thundering Herd, of the East Division, and the Toledo Rockets, of the West Division. The Rockets beat the Thundering Herd 41–36, coming back from a 23–0 deficit.

2001 Mid-American Conference football standings
	Div			Conf.			Overall
Team	W		L	W		L	W		L
East Division
Marshall x	6	–	0	8	–	0	11	–	2
Miami (OH)	4	–	2	6	–	2	7	–	5
Bowling Green	4	–	2	5	–	3	8	–	3
Kent State	3	–	3	5	–	3	6	–	5
Akron	3	–	3	4	–	4	4	–	7
Buffalo	1	–	5	1	–	7	3	–	8
Ohio	0	–	6	1	–	7	1	–	10
West Division
No. 23 Toledo xy$	4	–	1	5	–	2	10	–	2
Northern Illinois x	4	–	1	4	–	3	6	–	5
Ball State x	4	–	1	4	–	3	5	–	6
Western Michigan	2	–	3	4	–	4	5	–	6
Central Michigan	1	–	4	2	–	6	3	–	8
Eastern Michigan	0	–	5	1	–	6	2	–	9
Championship: Toledo 41, Marshall 36
$ – Conference champion; x – Division champion/co-champions; Due to an unbalanced conference schedule, the team with best division record within each division was awarded that division's championship game berth.; Rankings from AP Poll
