= 2001 Western Kentucky Hilltoppers football team =

American college football season

2001 Western Kentucky Hilltoppers football

NCAA Division I-AA First Round, L 20–24 at Furman
- Conference: Gateway Football Conference

Ranking
- Sports Network: No. 12
- Record: 8–4 (5–2 Gateway)
- Head coach: Jack Harbaugh (13th season)
- Co-offensive coordinators: Willie Taggart (1st season); Keven Lightner (1st season)
- Offensive scheme: Multiple
- Defensive coordinator: David Elson (1st season)
- Base defense: 3–4
- Home stadium: L. T. Smith Stadium

2001 Gateway Football Conference standings
	Conf.			Overall
Team	W		L	W		L
No. 4 Northern Iowa $^	6	–	1	11	–	3
No. 12 Western Kentucky ^	5	–	2	8	–	4
No. 15 Youngstown State	5	–	2	8	–	3
Western Illinois	4	–	3	5	–	5
Southwest Missouri State	3	–	4	6	–	5
Indiana State	2	–	5	3	–	8
Illinois State	2	–	5	2	–	9
Southern Illinois	1	–	6	1	–	10
$ – Conference champion; ^ – NCAA Division I-AA playoff participant; Rankings from The Sports Network poll

The 2001 Western Kentucky Hilltoppers football team represented Western Kentucky University in the 2001 NCAA Division I-AA football season and were coached by Jack Harbaugh. This was the school's first season as a member of the Gateway Football Conference, having won the Ohio Valley Conference championship the previous year. The Hilltoppers were the preseason favorites to win the conference but finished tied for 2nd. They qualified for the NCAA Division I-AA Playoffs where they were defeated by eventual runner-up, Furman. The team was originally scheduled to play Wisconsin on September 14, however, due to the September 11 attacks, all college football games were suspended the following weekend, and the game was played on the 29th.

This team included future NFL players Joseph Jefferson, Mel Mitchell, Sherrod Coates, and Brian Claybourn. Mitchell, Eric Dandy, and Chris Price were named to the AP All American team and Jefferson was selected to play in the Blue-Gray Football Classic. The All-Conference team included Coates, Dandy, Jefferson, Mitchell, Price, Patrick Reynolds, Buster Ashley, Claybourn, Peter Martinez, Kyle Moffatt, and Daniel Withrow.

== Schedule ==
Date	Opponent	Rank	Site	Result	Attendance	Source
August 30	at No. 13 Western Illinois	No. 3	Hanson Field; Macomb, IL	L 13–17	11,832	
September 8	Kentucky State*	No. 10	L. T. Smith Stadium; Bowling Green, KY	W 48–0	11,000	
September 22	Southwest Missouri	No. 8	L. T. Smith Stadium; Bowling Green, KY	W 23–7	9,500	
September 29	at Wisconsin*	No. 7	Camp Randall Stadium; Madison, WI	L 6–24	75,662	
October 6	Elon*	No. 11	L. T. Smith Stadium; Bowling Green, KY	W 24–7	7,700	
October 13	at Indiana State	No. 11	Memorial Stadium; Terre Haute, IN	W 22–9	3,545	
October 20	No. 11 McNeese State*^{†}	No. 10	L. T. Smith Stadium; Bowling Green, KY	W 21–0	14,000	
October 27	at No. 5 Youngstown State	No. 10	Stambaugh Stadium; Youngstown, OH	W 24–14	16,591	
November 3	at Illinois State	No. 7	Hancock Stadium; Normal, IL	W 58–14	6,493	
November 10	No. 15 Northern Iowa	No. 6	L. T. Smith Stadium; Bowling Green, KY	L 23–24	10,300	
November 17	Southern Illinois	No. 12	L. T. Smith Stadium; Bowling Green, KY	W 36–6	5,800	
December 1	at No. 4 Furman*	No. 11	Paladin Stadium; Greenville, SC (NCAA Division I-AA First Round)	L 20–24	6,143	
*Non-conference game; ^{†}Homecoming; Rankings from The Sports Network Poll released prior to the game
