= 2001 Ball State Cardinals football team =

American college football season

2001 Ball State Cardinals football
- Conference: Mid-American Conference
- West Division
- Record: 5–6 (4–1 MAC West)
- Head coach: Bill Lynch (7th season)
- Home stadium: Ball State Stadium

2001 Mid-American Conference football standings
	Div			Conf.			Overall
Team	W		L	W		L	W		L
East Division
Marshall x	6	–	0	8	–	0	11	–	2
Miami (OH)	4	–	2	6	–	2	7	–	5
Bowling Green	4	–	2	5	–	3	8	–	3
Kent State	3	–	3	5	–	3	6	–	5
Akron	3	–	3	4	–	4	4	–	7
Buffalo	1	–	5	1	–	7	3	–	8
Ohio	0	–	6	1	–	7	1	–	10
West Division
No. 23 Toledo xy$	4	–	1	5	–	2	10	–	2
Northern Illinois x	4	–	1	4	–	3	6	–	5
Ball State x	4	–	1	4	–	3	5	–	6
Western Michigan	2	–	3	4	–	4	5	–	6
Central Michigan	1	–	4	2	–	6	3	–	8
Eastern Michigan	0	–	5	1	–	6	2	–	9
Championship: Toledo 41, Marshall 36
$ – Conference champion; x – Division champion/co-champions; Due to an unbalanced conference schedule, the team with best division record within each division was awarded that division's championship game berth.; Rankings from AP Poll

The 2001 Ball State Cardinals football team was an American football team that represented Ball State University in the West Division of the Mid-American Conference (MAC) during the 2001 NCAA Division I-A football season. In its seventh season under head coach Bill Lynch, the team compiled a 5–6 record (4–1 against conference opponents) and tied for first place in the MAC West. The team played its home games at Ball State Stadium in Muncie, Indiana.

The team's statistical leaders included Talmadge Hill with 1,953 passing yards, Marcus Merriweather with 1,244 rushing yards and 78 points scored, and Sean Schembra with 432 receiving yards.

== Schedule ==
Date	Opponent	Site	Result	Attendance	Source
September 1	at Auburn*	Jordan-Hare Stadium; Auburn, AL	L 0–30	82,376	
September 8	at Kentucky*	Commonwealth Stadium; Lexington, KY	L 20–28	61,523	
September 15	Southern Illinois*	Ball State Stadium; Muncie, IN	Canceled		
September 22	Northern Iowa*	Ball State Stadium; Muncie, IN	L 39–42		
September 29	Miami (OH)	Ball State Stadium; Muncie, IN	L 20–28	11,519	
October 13	at Eastern Michigan	Rynearson Stadium; Ypsilanti, MI	W 35–14		
October 20	No. 25 Toledo	Ball State Stadium; Muncie, IN	W 24–20		
October 27	at Connecticut	Memorial Stadium; Storrs, CT	W 10–5	16,041	
November 3	Central Michigan	Ball State Stadium; Muncie, IN	W 38–34	20,757	
November 10	Kent State	Ball State Stadium; Muncie, IN	L 18–31		
November 17	at Northern Illinois	Huskie Stadium; DeKalb, IL (rivalry)	L 29–33	11,795	
November 24	at Western Michigan	Waldo Stadium; Kalamazoo, MI	W 35–31		
*Non-conference game; Rankings from AP Poll released prior to the game
