= 2001 Miami RedHawks football team =

American college football season

2001 Miami RedHawks football
- Conference: Mid-American Conference
- East Division
- Record: 7–5 (6–2 MAC)
- Head coach: Terry Hoeppner (3rd season)
- Offensive coordinator: Shane Montgomery (1st season)
- Offensive scheme: Multiple
- Defensive coordinator: Jon Wauford (2nd season)
- Base defense: 4–3
- Home stadium: Yager Stadium

2001 Mid-American Conference football standings
	Div			Conf.			Overall
Team	W		L	W		L	W		L
East Division
Marshall x	6	–	0	8	–	0	11	–	2
Miami (OH)	4	–	2	6	–	2	7	–	5
Bowling Green	4	–	2	5	–	3	8	–	3
Kent State	3	–	3	5	–	3	6	–	5
Akron	3	–	3	4	–	4	4	–	7
Buffalo	1	–	5	1	–	7	3	–	8
Ohio	0	–	6	1	–	7	1	–	10
West Division
No. 23 Toledo xy$	4	–	1	5	–	2	10	–	2
Northern Illinois x	4	–	1	4	–	3	6	–	5
Ball State x	4	–	1	4	–	3	5	–	6
Western Michigan	2	–	3	4	–	4	5	–	6
Central Michigan	1	–	4	2	–	6	3	–	8
Eastern Michigan	0	–	5	1	–	6	2	–	9
Championship: Toledo 41, Marshall 36
$ – Conference champion; x – Division champion/co-champions; Due to an unbalanced conference schedule, the team with best division record within each division was awarded that division's championship game berth.; Rankings from AP Poll

The 2001 Miami RedHawks football team represented the Miami University in the 2001 NCAA Division I-A football season. They played their home games at Yager Stadium in Oxford, Ohio and competed as members of the Mid-American Conference. The team was coached by head coach Terry Hoeppner.

== Schedule ==
Date	Time	Opponent	Site	TV	Result	Attendance
September 1	3:30 pm	at No. 12 Michigan*	Michigan Stadium; Ann Arbor, MI	ESPN	L 13–31	109,676
September 8	12:00 pm	at Iowa*	Kinnick Stadium; owa City, IA	ESPN Plus	L 19–44	58,291
September 22	2:00 pm	Cincinnati*	Yager Stadium; Oxford, OH (Victory Bell)		W 21–14	25,036
September 29	2:00 pm	at Ball State	Ball State Stadium; Muncie, IN		W 28–20	11,519
October 6	2:00 pm	Buffalo	Yager Stadium; Oxford, OH		W 31–14	20,108
October 13	2:00 pm	Akron	Yager Stadium; Oxford, OH		W 30–27	10,561
October 20	3:00 pm	at Ohio	Peden Stadium; Athens, OH (Battle of the Bricks)	FSN	W 36–24	23,427
October 27	2:30 pm	Western Michigan^{†}	Yager Stadium; Oxford, OH	FSN	W 25–11	15,850
November 3	4:00 pm	at Bowling Green	Doyt Perry Stadium; Bowling Green, OH		W 24–21	22,828
November 10	12:00 pm	Marshall	Yager Stadium; Oxford, OH	FSN	L 21–27	24,286
November 17	11:00 pm	at Hawaii*	Aloha Stadium; Halawa, HI		L 51–52	33,148
November 24	12:00 pm	at Kent State	Dix Stadium; Kent, OH		L 20–24	5,264
*Non-conference game; ^{†}Homecoming; Rankings from AP Poll released prior to the game; All times are in Eastern time

== Roster ==
2001 Miami Redskins football team roster
Players			Coaches
Offense: Pos. / # / Name / Class; QB / 7 / Ben Roethlisberger / Fr	Defense: Pos. / # / Name / Class	Special teams: Pos. / # / Name / Class	Head coach: Terry Hoeppner; Coordinators/assistant coaches Jim Wachenheim (Assistant Head Coach/RBs) Shane Montgomery (Offensive Coordinator) Jon Wauford (Defensive Coordinator) Brian George (Defensive Line) Bobby Johnson (Tight Ends and Tackles) Taver Johnson (Linebackers) Joe Palcic (Defensive Backs) John Peterson (Offensive Line) Brian Von Bergen (Wide Receivers) Legend: (C) Team captain; (S) Suspended; (I) Ineligible; Injured; Redshirt
