= 2001 Kent State Golden Flashes football team =

American college football season

2001 Kent State Golden Flashes football
- Conference: Mid-American Conference
- East Division
- Record: 6–5 (5–3 MAC)
- Head coach: Dean Pees (4th season)
- Defensive coordinator: Greg Colby (4th season)
- Home stadium: Dix Stadium

2001 Mid-American Conference football standings
| | Div | | | Conf. | | | Overall |
| Team | W | | L | W | | L | W | | L |
|---|---|---|---|---|---|---|---|---|---|
East Division
| Marshall x | 6 | – | 0 | 8 | – | 0 | 11 | – | 2 |
| Miami (OH) | 4 | – | 2 | 6 | – | 2 | 7 | – | 5 |
| Bowling Green | 4 | – | 2 | 5 | – | 3 | 8 | – | 3 |
| Kent State | 3 | – | 3 | 5 | – | 3 | 6 | – | 5 |
| Akron | 3 | – | 3 | 4 | – | 4 | 4 | – | 7 |
| Buffalo | 1 | – | 5 | 1 | – | 7 | 3 | – | 8 |
| Ohio | 0 | – | 6 | 1 | – | 7 | 1 | – | 10 |
West Division
| No. 23 Toledo xy$ | 4 | – | 1 | 5 | – | 2 | 10 | – | 2 |
| Northern Illinois x | 4 | – | 1 | 4 | – | 3 | 6 | – | 5 |
| Ball State x | 4 | – | 1 | 4 | – | 3 | 5 | – | 6 |
| Western Michigan | 2 | – | 3 | 4 | – | 4 | 5 | – | 6 |
| Central Michigan | 1 | – | 4 | 2 | – | 6 | 3 | – | 8 |
| Eastern Michigan | 0 | – | 5 | 1 | – | 6 | 2 | – | 9 |
Championship: Toledo 41, Marshall 36
$ – Conference champion; x – Division champion/co-champions; Due to an unbalanced conference schedule, the team with best division record within each division was awarded that division's championship game berth.; Rankings from AP Poll

The 2001 Kent State Golden Flashes football team was an American football team that represented Kent State University in the Mid-American Conference (MAC) during the 2001 NCAA Division I-A football season. In their fourth season under head coach Dean Pees, the Golden Flashes compiled a 6–5 record (5–3 against MAC opponents), finished in a tie for fourth place in the MAC East, and were outscored by all opponents by a combined total of 281 to 248.

The team's statistical leaders included Josh Cribbs with 1,019 rushing yards and 1,516 passing yards and Jurron Kelly with 479 receiving yards.

== Schedule ==
| Date | Opponent | Site | Result | Attendance | Source |
|---|---|---|---|---|---|
| September 1 | at Iowa* | Kinnick Stadium; Iowa City, IA | L 0–51 | 56,091 | |
| September 8 | Bucknell (I-AA)* | Dix Stadium; Kent, OH | W 38–17 | 6,872 | |
| September 22 | at West Virginia* | Mountaineer Field; Morgantown, WV | L 14–34 | 47,458 | |
| September 29 | at Akron | Rubber Bowl; Akron, OH (Wagon Wheel) | L 10–14 | | |
| October 6 | at Bowling Green | Doyt Perry Stadium; Bowling Green, OH (Anniversary Award) | L 7–24 | 12,539 | |
| October 13 | Northern Illinois | Dix Stadium; Kent, OH | W 44–34 | 2,973 | |
| October 20 | Buffalo | Dix Stadium; Kent, OH | W 35–13 | 8,260 | |
| October 27 | at Ohio | Peden Stadium; Athens, OH | W 24–14 | 19,415 | |
| November 3 | Marshall | Dix Stadium; Kent, OH | L 21–42 | 12,607 | |
| November 10 | at Ball State | Ball State Stadium; Muncie, IN | W 31–18 | | |
| November 24 | Miami (OH) | Dix Stadium; Kent, OH | W 24–20 | 5,264 | |
*Non-conference game
