= 2001 Southwest Missouri State Bears football team =

American college football season

2001 Southwest Missouri State Bears football
- Conference: Gateway Football Conference
- Record: 6–5 (3–4 GFC)
- Head coach: Randy Ball (3rd season)
- Offensive coordinator: Courtney Messingham (2nd season)
- Defensive coordinator: Deion Melvin (3rd season)
- Captains: P. J. Jones; Austin Moherman; Rod Pickett; Demetrius Smith; Enoch Smith
- Home stadium: Plaster Sports Complex

2001 Gateway Football Conference standings
	Conf.			Overall
Team	W		L	W		L
No. 4 Northern Iowa $^	6	–	1	11	–	3
No. 12 Western Kentucky ^	5	–	2	8	–	4
No. 15 Youngstown State	5	–	2	8	–	3
Western Illinois	4	–	3	5	–	5
Southwest Missouri State	3	–	4	6	–	5
Indiana State	2	–	5	3	–	8
Illinois State	2	–	5	2	–	9
Southern Illinois	1	–	6	1	–	10
$ – Conference champion; ^ – NCAA Division I-AA playoff participant; Rankings from The Sports Network poll

The 2001 Southwest Missouri State Bears football team represented Southwest Missouri State University (now known as Missouri State University) as a member of the Gateway Football Conference (GFC) during the 2001 NCAA Division I-AA football season. Led by third-year head coach Randy Ball, the Bears compiled an overall record of 6–5, with a mark of 3–4 in conference play, and finished fifth in the GFC.

== Schedule ==
Date	Opponent	Site	Result	Attendance	Source
September 1	at Kansas*	Memorial Stadium; Lawrence, KS	L 10–24	37,500	
September 8	Midwestern State*	Plaster Sports Complex; Springfield, MO	W 28–6	500	
September 15	at Southeast Missouri State*	Houck Stadium; Cape Girardeau, MO	W 31–28	8,680	
September 22	at No. 8 Western Kentucky	L. T. Smith Stadium; Bowling Green, KY	L 7–23	9,500	
October 6	No. 18 Northern Iowa	Plaster Sports Complex; Springfield, MO	L 3–27	12,592	
October 13	at No. 5 Youngstown State	Stambaugh Stadium; Youngstown, OH	L 20–41	14,778	
October 20	Indiana State^{†}	Plaster Sports Complex; Springfield, MO	L 19–25	13,662	
October 27	at No. 16 Western Illinois	Hanson Field; Macomb, IL	W 43–28	5,187	
November 3	Drake*	Plaster Sports Complex; Springfield, MO	W 63–14		
November 10	at Southern Illinois	McAndrew Stadium; Carbondale, IL	W 25–24	2,140	
November 17	Illinois State	Plaster Sports Complex; Springfield, MO	W 48–31	5,540	
*Non-conference game; ^{†}Homecoming; Rankings from The Sports Network Poll released prior to the game
