= Chester Taylor =

American football player (born 1979)

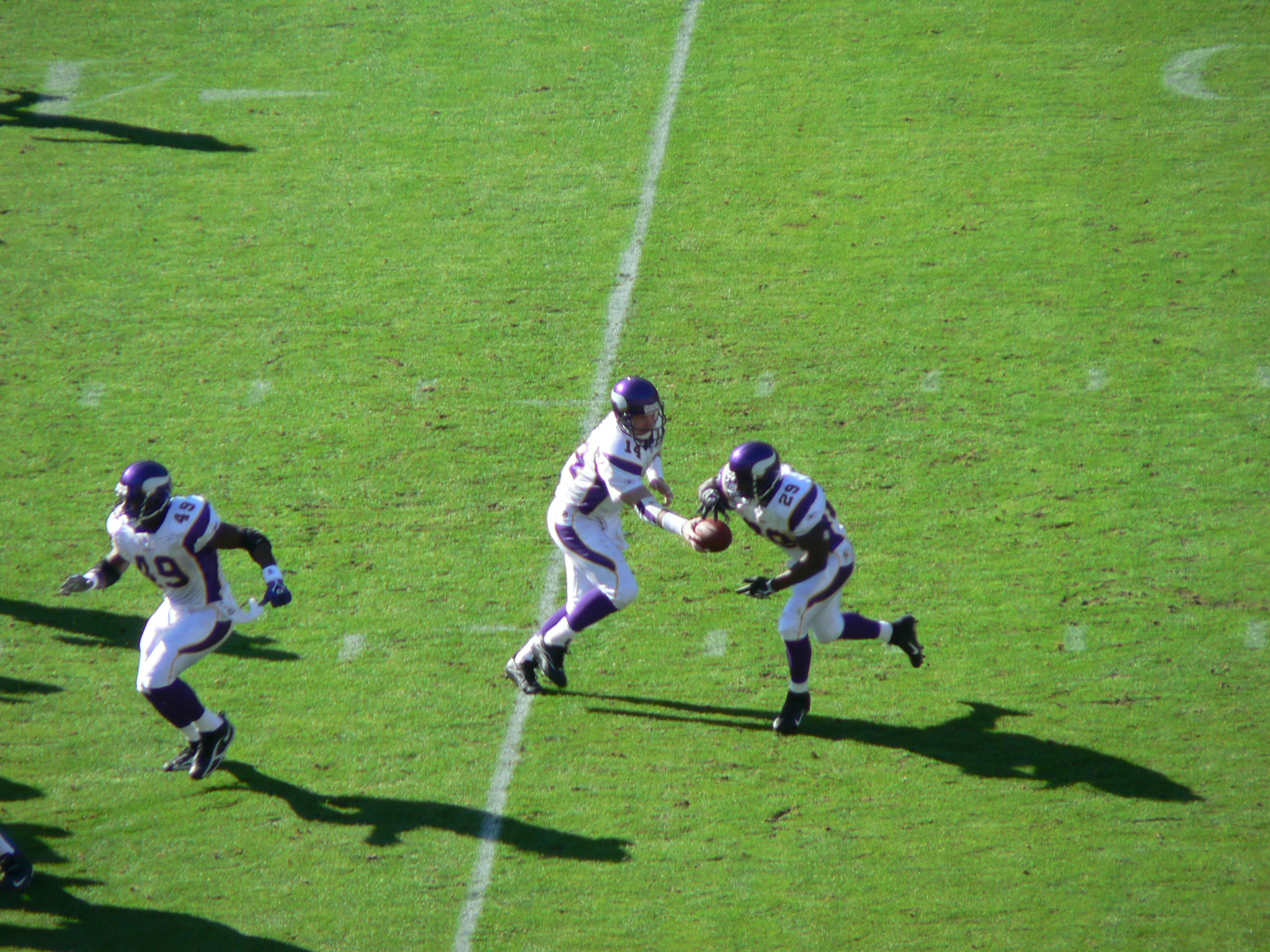
- Taylor takes a handoff from Brad Johnson in 2006

No. 29
- Position: Running back

Personal information
- Born: September 22, 1979 (age 47); River Rouge, Michigan, U.S.
- Listed height: 5 ft 11 in (1.80 m)
- Listed weight: 213 lb (97 kg)

Career information
- High school: River Rouge
- College: Toledo (1998–2001)
- NFL draft: 2002: 6th round, 207th overall pick

Career history
- Baltimore Ravens (2002–2005); Minnesota Vikings (2006–2009); Chicago Bears (2010); Arizona Cardinals (2011)

Awards and highlights
- Third-team All-American (2001); 3× First-team All-MAC (1999, 2000, 2001)

Career NFL statistics
- Rushing attempts: 1,160
- Rushing yards: 4,740
- Rushing touchdowns: 26
- Receptions: 299
- Receiving yards: 2,324
- Receiving touchdowns: 6
- Stats at Pro Football Reference

Chester Lamar Taylor (born September 22, 1979), nicknamed "Che Tay", is an American former professional football player who was a running back in the National Football League (NFL). He was selected by the Baltimore Ravens in the sixth round of the 2002 NFL draft. In 2006, he signed with the Minnesota Vikings and played four seasons before signing with the Chicago Bears. He played college football for the Toledo Rockets.

== Early life ==
Taylor was a four-time all-state running back and sprinter at River Rouge High School before attending the University of Toledo. While at Toledo, Taylor set school records for rushing yards and touchdowns. In 2001, he led the Rockets to an impressive victory over in-state rival Cincinnati Bearcats in the Motor City Bowl, giving Toledo their first bowl win since the 1995 Las Vegas Bowl. He was named the MVP of the game with 31 (Motor City Bowl Record) carries for 190 yards (then a Motor City Bowl Record) and a touchdown. In track, Taylor competed in the 100-meter dash and recorded a PR of 11.14 seconds.

Taylor ranked seventh in nation for the 2001 season with 1,492 rushing yards (268 attempts, 5.3 yards-per-carry) and 20 touchdowns. He also hauled in 26 receptions for 242 yards and three touchdowns, with a longest reception of 43 yards.

Taylor was named North Team MVP in the 2002 Hula Bowl.

== Professional career ==
Pre-draft measurables
Height	Weight	Arm length	Hand span	40-yard dash	10-yard split	20-yard split	Vertical jump	Broad jump	Bench press
5 ft 10 3/4 in (1.80 m)	213 lb (97 kg)	30 1/8 in (0.77 m)	9 3/4 in (0.25 m)	4.63 s	1.63 s	2.70 s	33.0 in (0.84 m)	9 ft 6 in (2.90 m)	22 reps
All values from NFL Combine

=== Baltimore Ravens ===
Taylor was taken with the 35th pick in the sixth round (207th overall) of the 2002 NFL draft by the Baltimore Ravens. He spent four years backing up Jamal Lewis, seeing minimal yet increasing playing time throughout his tenure with the team. He also developed himself as a receiving threat, making him the Ravens third down back.

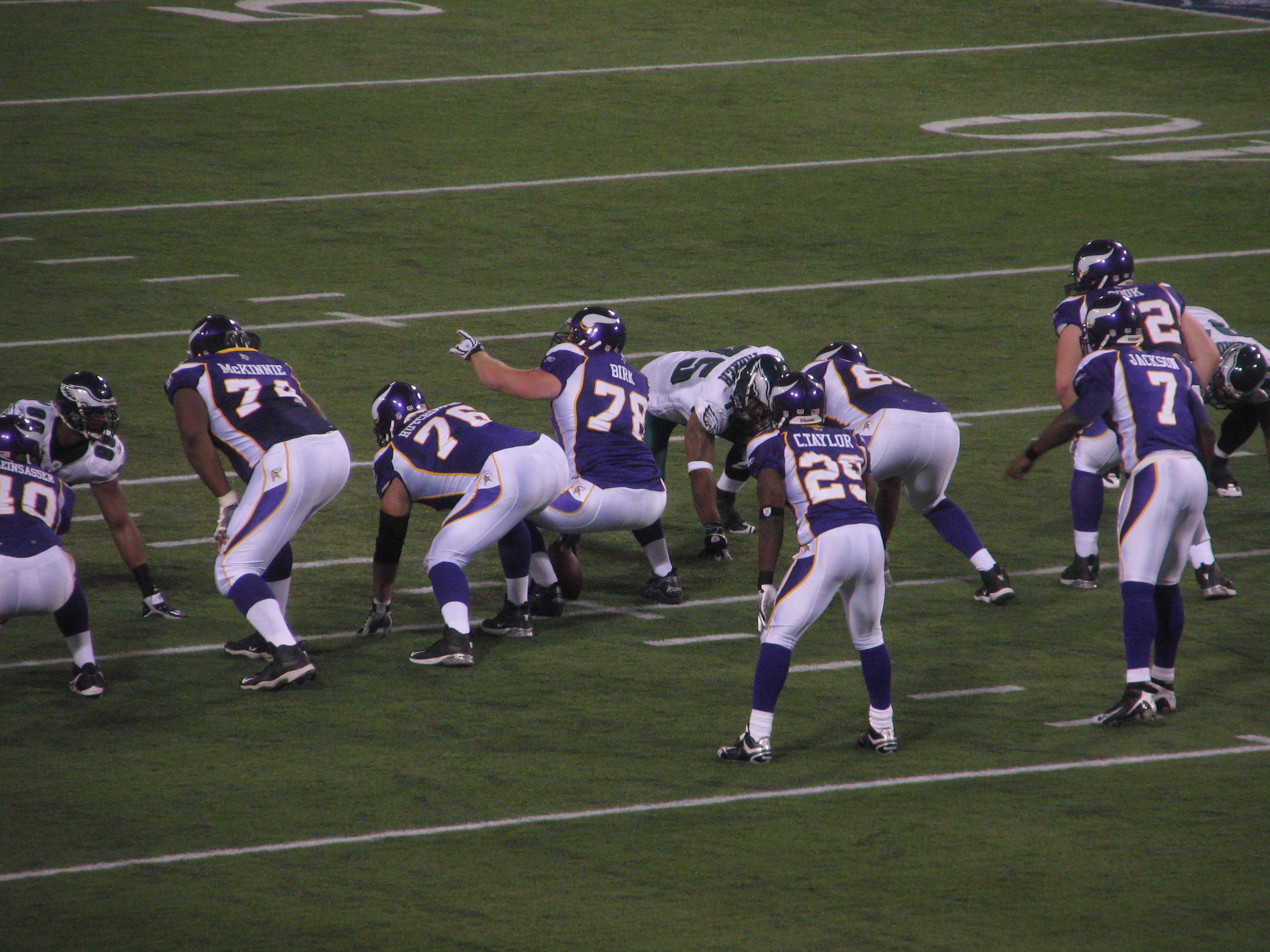
Taylor (29) lines up with the Vikings in January, 2009.

=== Minnesota Vikings ===
Taylor was signed by the Minnesota Vikings to a four-year, $14.1 million contract on March 12, 2006. On October 22, 2006, Taylor set a Vikings franchise record for longest run from scrimmage when he ran for a 95-yard touchdown in the third quarter, which is also an NFL record for the longest run in the 3rd quarter, against the Seattle Seahawks. He also broke 1000 rushing yards for the first time in his NFL career. Taylor and Adrian Peterson were considered one of the NFL's top running back tandems.

=== Chicago Bears ===
Taylor was signed by the Chicago Bears to a four-year, $12.5 million contract on March 5, 2010. In 2010, Taylor shared carries with running back Matt Forte. His stats fell compared to his times with the Ravens and Vikings and rushed for only 267 yards on 112 carries for a 2.4 yard average.

Taylor was released by Chicago during final cuts on September 3, 2011.

=== Arizona Cardinals ===
Taylor was claimed via waivers for a one-year contract by the Arizona Cardinals on September 4, 2011.

== Career statistics ==
Legend
	Led the league
**Bold**	Career high

=== NFL ===
==== Regular season ====
Year	Team	Games		Rushing					Receiving				
Year	Team	GP	GS	Att	Yds	Avg	Lng	TD	Rec	Yds	Avg	Lng	TD
2002	BAL	15	2	33	122	3.7	17	0	14	129	9.2	20	**2**
2003	BAL	16	1	63	276	4.4	32	2	20	132	6.6	23	0
2004	BAL	16	4	160	714	4.5	47	2	30	184	6.1	23	0
2005	BAL	15	1	117	487	4.2	52	0	41	292	7.1	20	1
2006	MIN	15	15	**303**	**1,216**	4.0	**95**	6	42	288	6.9	24	0
2007	MIN	14	8	157	844	**5.4**	84	**7**	29	281	**9.7**	**50**	0
2008	MIN	16	1	101	399	4.0	21	4	**45**	**399**	8.9	47	**2**
2009	MIN	16	0	94	338	3.6	25	1	44	389	8.8	33	1
2010	CHI	16	1	112	267	2.4	24	3	20	139	7.0	18	0
2011	ARI	12	1	20	77	3.9	34	1	14	91	6.5	17	0
		151	34	1,160	4,740	4.1	95	26	299	2,324	7.8	50	6

==== Postseason ====
Year	Team	Games		Rushing					Receiving				
Year	Team	GP	GS	Att	Yds	Avg	Lng	TD	Rec	Yds	Avg	Lng	TD
2003	BAL	1	0	0	0	0.0	0	0	2	19	9.5	**16**	0
2008	MIN	1	0	12	48	4.0	11	0	**5**	**36**	7.2	10	0
2009	MIN	2	0	10	**51**	**5.1**	**14**	0	**5**	34	6.8	11	0
2010	CHI	2	0	**14**	46	3.3	11	**2**	1	12	**12.0**	12	0
		6	0	36	145	4.0	14	2	13	101	7.8	16	0

=== College ===
Year	Team	GP	Rushing			
Year	Team	GP	Att	Yds	Avg	TD
1998	Toledo	10	103	570	5.5	5
1999	Toledo	11	182	1,176	**6.5**	12
2000	Toledo	11	250	**1,470**	5.9	18
2001	Toledo	11	**268**	1,430	5.3	**20**
Career		43	803	4,646	5.8	55

== See also ==
- List of Division I FBS rushing touchdown leaders
