= 2001 Eastern Illinois Panthers football team =

American college football season

2001 Eastern Illinois Panthers football

OVC champion

NCAA Division I-AA First Round, L 43–49 at Northern Iowa
- Conference: Ohio Valley Conference

Ranking
- Sports Network: No. 9
- Record: 9–2 (6–0 OVC)
- Head coach: Bob Spoo (15th season)
- Offensive coordinator: Roy Wittke (12th season)
- Home stadium: O'Brien Stadium

2001 Ohio Valley Conference football standings
	Conf.			Overall
Team	W		L	W		L
No. 9 Eastern Illinois $^	6	–	0	9	–	1
No. 18 Eastern Kentucky	5	–	1	8	–	2
No. 23 Tennessee Tech	4	–	2	7	–	3
No. 25 Tennessee State	3	–	3	8	–	3
Murray State	2	–	4	4	–	6
Southeast Missouri State	1	–	5	4	–	7
Tennessee–Martin	0	–	6	1	–	10
$ – Conference champion; ^ – NCAA Division I-AA playoff participant; Rankings from The Sports Network poll

The 2001 Eastern Illinois Panthers represented Eastern Illinois University as a member of the Ohio Valley Conference (OVC) during the 2001 NCAA Division I-AA football season. Led by 15th-year head coach Bob Spoo, the Panthers compiled an overall record of 9–2, winning the OVC title with a conference mark of 6–1. Eastern Illinois was invited to the NCAA Division I-AA Football Championship playoffs, where they lost in the first round to Northern Iowa. The Bobcats were ranked ninth in the final Sports Network poll.

== Schedule ==
Date	Time	Opponent	Rank	Site	Result	Attendance	Source
September 8		Indiana State*	No. 12	O'Brien Stadium; Charleston, IL	W 44–14		
September 15		at Illinois State*	No. 11	Hancock Stadium; Normal, IL (rivalry)	Canceled		
September 22		at Eastern Kentucky	No. 11	Roy Kidd Stadium; Richmond, KY	W 21–14		
September 29		Tennessee Tech	No. 8	O'Brien Stadium; Charleston, IL	W 44–33		
October 6	10:00 p.m.	at San Diego State*	No. 6	Qualcomm Stadium; San Diego, CA	L 7–40	20,064	
October 13		Southeast Missouri State	No. 10	O'Brien Stadium; Charleston, IL	W 12–0		
October 20	1:30 p.m.	at Southern Illinois*	No. 9	Saluki Stadium; Carbondale, IL	W 49–21	5,150	
October 27		No. 13 Tennessee State	No. 9	O'Brien Stadium; Charleston, IL	W 52–49		
November 1		at Tennessee–Martin	No. 6	Graham Stadium; Martin, TN	W 56–16		
November 10	3:00 p.m.	at Florida Atlantic*	No. 4	Pro Player Stadium; Miami Gardens, FL	W 38–10	10,286	
November 17	2:38 p.m.	Murray State	No. 3	O'Brien Stadium; Charleston, IL	W 37–6	5,243	
December 1		at No. 6 Northern Iowa*	No. 3	UNI-Dome; Cedar Falls, IA (NCAA Division I-AA First Round)	L 43–49		
*Non-conference game; Rankings from The Sports Network Poll released prior to the game; All times are in Central time
