= 2001 Illinois State Redbirds football team =

American college football season

2001 Illinois State Redbirds football
- Conference: Gateway Football Conference
- Record: 2–9 (2–5 Gateway)
- Head coach: Denver Johnson (2nd season)
- MVPs: Boomer Grigsby; Willie Watts
- Home stadium: Hancock Stadium

2001 Gateway Football Conference standings
| | Conf. | | | Overall |
| Team | W | | L | W | | L |
|---|---|---|---|---|---|---|
| No. 4 Northern Iowa $^ | 6 | – | 1 | 11 | – | 3 |
| No. 12 Western Kentucky ^ | 5 | – | 2 | 8 | – | 4 |
| No. 15 Youngstown State | 5 | – | 2 | 8 | – | 3 |
| Western Illinois | 4 | – | 3 | 5 | – | 5 |
| Southwest Missouri State | 3 | – | 4 | 6 | – | 5 |
| Indiana State | 2 | – | 5 | 3 | – | 8 |
| Illinois State | 2 | – | 5 | 2 | – | 9 |
| Southern Illinois | 1 | – | 6 | 1 | – | 10 |
$ – Conference champion; ^ – NCAA Division I-AA playoff participant; Rankings from The Sports Network poll

The 2001 Illinois State Redbirds football team represented Illinois State University as a member of the Gateway Football Conference during the 2001 NCAA Division I-AA football season. The team was led by second-year head coach Denver Johnson and played their home games at Hancock Stadium in Normal, Illinois. The Redbirds finished the season with an overall record of 2–9 and a record of 2–5 in conference play, tying for sixth place in the Gateway.

== Schedule ==
| Date | Opponent | Rank | Site | Result | Attendance | Source |
|---|---|---|---|---|---|---|
| August 30 | at Western Michigan* | No. 16 | Waldo Stadium; Kalamazoo, MI | L 7–48 | 33,976 | |
| September 8 | at Murray State* | No. 21 | Roy Stewart Stadium; Murray, KY | L 17–32 | 2,661 | |
| September 15 | No. 11 Eastern Illinois* | | Hancock Stadium; Normal, IL | Canceled | | |
| September 22 | Southeast Missouri State* | | Hancock Stadium; Normal, IL | L 33–38 | 7,027 | |
| September 29 | No. 19 Southwest Texas State* | | Hancock Stadium; Normal, IL | L 13–20 | 12,461 | |
| October 6 | at Southern Illinois | | McAndrew Stadium; Carbondale, IL | L 17–23 | 9,830 | |
| October 13 | No. 14 Western Illinois | | Hancock Stadium; Normal, IL | L 23–33 | 6,777 | |
| October 20 | at No. 5 Youngstown State | | Stambaugh Stadium; Youngstown, OH | L 30–44 | 19,171 | |
| October 27 | No. 11 Northern Iowa^{†} | | Hancock Stadium; Normal, IL | W 42–14 | 10,173 | |
| November 3 | No. 7 Western Kentucky | | Hancock Stadium; Normal, IL | L 14–58 | 6,493 | |
| November 10 | Indiana State | | Hancock Stadium; Normal, IL | W 31–17 | 5,669 | |
| November 17 | at Southwest Missouri State | | Plaster Sports Complex; Springfield | L 31–48 | 5,540 | |
*Non-conference game; ^{†}Homecoming; Rankings from The Sports Network Poll released prior to the game
