= 2001 Akron Zips football team =

American college football season

2001 Akron Zips football
- Conference: Mid-American Conference
- East Division
- Record: 4–7 (4–4 MAC)
- Head coach: Lee Owens (7th season)
- Offensive coordinator: Paul Winters (7th season)
- Captains: Zac Derr; Tim Ritley; Chris Smith; Scott Smith
- Home stadium: Rubber Bowl

2001 Mid-American Conference football standings
	Div			Conf.			Overall
Team	W		L	W		L	W		L
East Division
Marshall x	6	–	0	8	–	0	11	–	2
Miami (OH)	4	–	2	6	–	2	7	–	5
Bowling Green	4	–	2	5	–	3	8	–	3
Kent State	3	–	3	5	–	3	6	–	5
Akron	3	–	3	4	–	4	4	–	7
Buffalo	1	–	5	1	–	7	3	–	8
Ohio	0	–	6	1	–	7	1	–	10
West Division
No. 23 Toledo xy$	4	–	1	5	–	2	10	–	2
Northern Illinois x	4	–	1	4	–	3	6	–	5
Ball State x	4	–	1	4	–	3	5	–	6
Western Michigan	2	–	3	4	–	4	5	–	6
Central Michigan	1	–	4	2	–	6	3	–	8
Eastern Michigan	0	–	5	1	–	6	2	–	9
Championship: Toledo 41, Marshall 36
$ – Conference champion; x – Division champion/co-champions; Due to an unbalanced conference schedule, the team with best division record within each division was awarded that division's championship game berth.; Rankings from AP Poll

The 2001 Akron Zips football team represented Akron University in the 2001 NCAA Division I-A football season; they competed in the Mid-American Conference. They were led by seventh–year head coach Lee Owens. The Zips played their home games at the Rubber Bowl in Akron, Ohio. They were outscored by their opponents 281–360 and finished with a record of 4 wins and 7 losses (4–7).

== Schedule ==
Date	Opponent	Site	Result	Attendance
August 30	Ohio	Rubber Bowl; Akron, OH	W 31–29	13,532
September 8	at No. 24 Ohio State*	Ohio Stadium; Columbus, OH	L 14–28	102,602
September 22	at Purdue*	Ross–Ade Stadium; West Lafayette, IN	L 14–33	63,459
September 29	Kent State	Rubber Bowl; Akron, OH (Wagon Wheel)	W 14–10	
October 6	at Western Michigan	Waldo Stadium; Kalamazoo, MI	L 14–31	
October 13	at Miami (OH)	Yager Stadium; Oxford, OH	L 27–30	10,561
October 20	Bowling Green	Rubber Bowl; Akron, OH	L 11–16	14,621
October 27	at Marshall	Marshall University Stadium; Huntington, WV	L 33–50	12,607
November 3	at UCF*	Florida Citrus Bowl; Orlando, FL	L 17–57	15,779
November 17	at Buffalo	University at Buffalo Stadium; Amherst, NY	W 41–14	7,811
November 24	Eastern Michigan	Rubber Bowl; Akron, OH	W 65–62 ^{3OT}	6,019
*Non-conference game; Rankings from AP Poll released prior to the game

== Roster ==
2001 Akron Zips football team roster
Players
Coaches
Offense

Pos.	#	Name	Class
WR	2	Matthew Cherry	So
QB	5	Charlie Frye	Fr

Defense

Pos.	#	Name	Class
LB	44	Chase Blackburn	Fr

Special teams

Pos.	#	Name	Class

Head coach

- Lee Owens

Coordinators/assistant coaches

Legend

- (C) Team captain
- (S) Suspended
- (I) Ineligible
- Injured
- Redshirt
