= 2001 Western Illinois Leathernecks football team =

American college football season

2001 Western Illinois Leathernecks football
- Conference: Gateway Football Conference
- Record: 5–5 (4–3 Gateway)
- Head coach: Don Patterson (3rd season)
- Offensive coordinator: Mark Hendrickson (3rd season)
- Home stadium: Hanson Field

2001 Gateway Football Conference standings
	Conf.			Overall
Team	W		L	W		L
No. 4 Northern Iowa $^	6	–	1	11	–	3
No. 12 Western Kentucky ^	5	–	2	8	–	4
No. 15 Youngstown State	5	–	2	8	–	3
Western Illinois	4	–	3	5	–	5
Southwest Missouri State	3	–	4	6	–	5
Indiana State	2	–	5	3	–	8
Illinois State	2	–	5	2	–	9
Southern Illinois	1	–	6	1	–	10
$ – Conference champion; ^ – NCAA Division I-AA playoff participant; Rankings from The Sports Network poll

The 2001 Western Illinois Leathernecks football team represented Western Illinois University as a member of the Gateway Football Conference during the 2001 NCAA Division I-AA football season. They were led by third-year head coach Don Patterson and played their home games at Hanson Field in Macomb, Illinois. The Leathernecks finished the season with a 5–5 record overall and a 4–3 record in conference play. Western Illinois played a ten-game schedule instead of the typical eleven-game schedule in Division I-AA, as they were unable to schedule an eleventh opponent before the season began.

== Schedule ==
Date	Opponent	Rank	Site	Result	Attendance	Source
August 30	No. 3 Western Kentucky	No. 13	Hanson Field; Macomb, IL	W 17–13	11,832	
September 22	at No. 3 Youngstown State	No. 6	Stambaugh Stadium; Youngstown, OH	L 7–41	19,331	
September 29	Southern Illinois	No. 13	Hanson Field; Macomb, IL	W 38–21	13,744	
October 6	Southern Utah*	No. 14	Hanson Field; Macomb, IL	W 27–20	8,824	
October 13	at Illinois State	No. 14	Hancock Stadium; Normal, IL	W 33–23	6,777	
October 20	No. 14 Northern Iowa	No. 12	Hanson Field; Macomb, IL	L 14–17	15,637	
October 27	Southwest Missouri State	No. 16	Hanson Field; Macomb, IL	L 28–43	5,187	
November 3	at No. 19 Sam Houston State*	No. 23	Bowers Stadium; Huntsville, TX	L 24–49	2,842	
November 10	at South Florida*		Raymond James Stadium; Tampa, FL	L 17–48	23,252	
November 17	at Indiana State		Memorial Stadium; Terre Haute, IN	W 52–15	6,135	
*Non-conference game; Rankings from The Sports Network Poll released prior to the game
