= 2001 Southern Illinois Salukis football team =

American college football season

2001 Southern Illinois Salukis football
- Conference: Gateway Football Conference
- Record: 1–10 (1–6 Gateway)
- Head coach: Jerry Kill (1st season)
- Offensive coordinator: Matt Limegrover (1st season)
- Defensive coordinator: Tracy Claeys (1st season)
- Home stadium: McAndrew Stadium

2001 Gateway Football Conference standings
	Conf.			Overall
Team	W		L	W		L
No. 4 Northern Iowa $^	6	–	1	11	–	3
No. 12 Western Kentucky ^	5	–	2	8	–	4
No. 15 Youngstown State	5	–	2	8	–	3
Western Illinois	4	–	3	5	–	5
Southwest Missouri State	3	–	4	6	–	5
Indiana State	2	–	5	3	–	8
Illinois State	2	–	5	2	–	9
Southern Illinois	1	–	6	1	–	10
$ – Conference champion; ^ – NCAA Division I-AA playoff participant; Rankings from The Sports Network poll

The 2001 Southern Illinois Salukis football team represented Southern Illinois University as a member of the Gateway Football Conference during the 2001 NCAA Division I-AA football season. They were led by first-year head coach Jerry Kill and played their home games at McAndrew Stadium in Carbondale, Illinois. The Salukis finished the season with a 1–10 record overall and a 1–6 record in conference play.

== Schedule ==
Date	Opponent	Site	Result	Attendance	Source
September 8	at Southeast Missouri State*	Houck Stadium; Cape Girardeau, MO	L 5–24	9,822	
September 15	at Ball State*	Ball State Stadium; Muncie, IN	Canceled		
September 22	Murray State*	McAndrew Stadium; Carbondale, IL	L 20–24	11,675	
September 29	at No. 13 Western Illinois	Hanson Field; Macomb, IL	L 21–38	13,744	
October 6	Illinois State^{†}	McAndrew Stadium; Carbondale, IL	W 23–17	9,830	
October 13	at No. 15 Northern Iowa	UNI-Dome; Cedar Falls, IA	L 14–19	13,455	
October 20	No. 9 Eastern Illinois*	McAndrew Stadium; Carbondale, IL	L 21–49	5,150	
October 27	at Indiana State	Memorial Stadium; Terre Haute, IN	L 14–20	4,533	
November 3	No. 10 Youngstown State	McAndrew Stadium; Carbondale, IL	L 7–31	2,090	
November 10	Southwest Missouri State	McAndrew Stadium; Carbondale, IL	L 24–25	2,140	
November 17	at No. 12 Western Kentucky	L. T. Smith Stadium; Bowling Green, KY	L 6–36	5,800	
November 24	at Baylor*	Floyd Casey Stadium; Waco, TX	L 12–56	7,321	
*Non-conference game; ^{†}Homecoming; Rankings from The Sports Network Poll released prior to the game
