= 2001 Marshall Thundering Herd football team =

American college football season

2001 Marshall Thundering Herd football

MAC East Division champion GMAC Bowl champion

MAC Championship Game, L 36–41 vs. Toledo

GMAC Bowl, W 64–61 ^{2OT} vs. East Carolina
- Conference: Mid-American Conference
- East

Ranking
- Coaches: No. 21
- Record: 11–2 (8–0 MAC)
- Head coach: Bob Pruett (6th season)
- Offensive coordinator: Ed Zaunbrecher (2nd season)
- Offensive scheme: Spread
- Defensive coordinator: Kevin Kelly (5th season)
- Base defense: 3–4
- Home stadium: Marshall University Stadium

2001 Mid-American Conference football standings
	Div			Conf.			Overall
Team	W		L	W		L	W		L
East Division
Marshall x	6	–	0	8	–	0	11	–	2
Miami (OH)	4	–	2	6	–	2	7	–	5
Bowling Green	4	–	2	5	–	3	8	–	3
Kent State	3	–	3	5	–	3	6	–	5
Akron	3	–	3	4	–	4	4	–	7
Buffalo	1	–	5	1	–	7	3	–	8
Ohio	0	–	6	1	–	7	1	–	10
West Division
No. 23 Toledo xy$	4	–	1	5	–	2	10	–	2
Northern Illinois x	4	–	1	4	–	3	6	–	5
Ball State x	4	–	1	4	–	3	5	–	6
Western Michigan	2	–	3	4	–	4	5	–	6
Central Michigan	1	–	4	2	–	6	3	–	8
Eastern Michigan	0	–	5	1	–	6	2	–	9
Championship: Toledo 41, Marshall 36
$ – Conference champion; x – Division champion/co-champions; Due to an unbalanced conference schedule, the team with best division record within each division was awarded that division's championship game berth.; Rankings from AP Poll

The 2001 Marshall Thundering Herd football team represented Marshall University in the 2001 NCAA Division I-A football season. The Thundering Herd played their home games at Marshall University Stadium in Huntington, West Virginia, and competed in the East Division of the Mid-American Conference (MAC). The team was coached by sixth-year head coach Bob Pruett. Marshall finished the season with a 64–61 win over East Carolina in the GMAC Bowl. It was the highest scoring bowl game in college football history.

== Schedule ==
Date	Time	Opponent	Rank	Site	TV	Result	Attendance	Source
September 1	7:15 pm	at No. 1 Florida*		Ben Hill Griffin Stadium; Gainesville, FL	ESPN2	L 14–49	85,445	
September 8	7:00 pm	UMass*		Marshall University Stadium; Huntington, WV		W 49–20	27,533	
September 15		at TCU*		Amon G. Carter Stadium; Fort Worth, TX		canceled^{[a]}		
September 29	7:00 pm	Bowling Green		Marshall University Stadium; Huntington, WV		W 37–31	32,034	
October 6	2:00 pm	at Northern Illinois		Huskie Stadium; DeKalb, IL		W 37–15	17,367	
October 13	1:00 pm	at Buffalo		University at Buffalo Stadium; Amherst, NY		W 34–14	12,438	
October 20	4:00 pm	Central Michigan^{†}		Marshall University Stadium; Huntington, WV		W 42–21	30,063	
October 27	7:00 pm	Akron		Marshall University Stadium; Huntington, WV		W 50–33	22,129	
November 3	3:00 pm	at Kent State		Dix Stadium; Kent, OH		W 42–21	12,607	
November 10	12:00 pm	at Miami (OH)		Yager Stadium; Oxford, OH		W 27–21	24,286	
November 17	3:00 pm	Ohio	No. 24	Marshall University Stadium; Huntington, WV (Battle for the Bell)		W 42–18	24,932	
November 24	7:00 pm	Youngstown State*	No. 20	Marshall University Stadium; Huntington, WV		W 38–24	16,041	
November 30	7:30 pm	at Toledo	No. 20	Glass Bowl; Toledo, OH (MAC Championship Game)	ESPN2	L 36–41	20,025	
December 19	8:00 pm	vs. East Carolina*		Ladd–Peebles Stadium; Mobile, AL (GMAC Bowl)	ESPN2	W 64–61 ^{2OT}	40,139	
*Non-conference game; ^{†}Homecoming; Rankings from AP Poll released prior to the game; All times are in Eastern time

^{^[a]}The game between Marshall and TCU was canceled due to the September 11 attacks.

== Roster ==
2001 Marshall Thundering Herd football team roster
Players
Coaches
Offense

Pos.	#	Name	Class
WR	83	Brad Bates	Fr
C	70	Joey Stepp	So
OL	77	Josh Blakey	Fr
RB	8	Bradon Carey	So
QB	7	Byron Leftwich	Jr
G	75	Steve Sciullo	Jr
WR	40	Darius Watts	So

Defense

Pos.	#	Name	Class
DB	3	Moriah Anderson	Fr
LB	43	Kevin Atkins	Fr
LB	1	Gladstone Coke	So
FS	19	Chris Crocker	Jr
DE	50	Johnathan Goddard	Fr
DB	15	Yancey Satterwhite	Jr
LB	5	Max Yates	Sr

Special teams

Pos.	#	Name	Class
LS	54	Chris Massey	Sr

Head coach

- Bob Pruett

Coordinators/assistant coaches

- Lou Anarumo
  (Defensive backs)

Legend

- (C) Team captain
- (S) Suspended
- (I) Ineligible
- Injured
- Redshirt

Roster
Last update: 2001-12-22

== Team players drafted in the NFL ==
The following players were selected in the 2002 NFL draft.

Player	Position	Round	Pick	Franchise
Chris Massey	Fullback	7	243	St. Louis Rams
