= Jon Wauford =

American football player and coach (born 1970)

Biographical details
- Born: February 11, 1970 (age 56); Findlay, Ohio

Playing career
- 1988–1991: Miami (OH)
- 1993: Ottawa Rough Riders
- 1994: Las Vegas Posse
- Position: Defensive lineman

Coaching career (HC unless noted)
- 1995–1998: Findlay (OLB/ST)
- 1999: Miami (OH) (DL)
- 2000–2002: Miami (OH) (DC)
- 2003: Clinton HS (IA) (assistant)
- 2004–2005: Kent State (DL)
- 2006: Findlay (AHC/DC)
- 2007–2010: Findlay
- 2011–2014: Clinton HS (IA) (assistant)
- 2015–2019: Clinton HS (IA)

Head coaching record
- Overall: 14–30 (college)

Jon Wauford (born February 11, 1970) is an American football player and coach who was the head coach at the University of Findlay from 2007 to 2010.

== Playing ==
Wauford played hockey and football at Findlay High School in Findlay, Ohio . He was a Defensive lineman for Miami University from 1988 to 1991. In 1990, he led the Mid-American Conference in tackles for loss (22), while compiling 93 tackles and 14 sacks. He also played one season for the Miami men's ice hockey team, scoring two goals in thirteen games.

Wauford signed with the Ottawa Rough Riders of the Canadian Football League in 1993, but did not appear in any games. He played for the Las Vegas Posse in 1994 and had four defensive tackles and one special teams tackle.

== Coaching ==
Wauford began his coaching career at the University of Findlay, where he was the outside linebackers coach and special teams coordinator from 1995 to 1998. He returned to Miami in 1999 as defensive ends coach. He was also responsible for recruiting in Northwest Ohio and convinced Ben Roethlisberger, who also attended Findlay High School, to go to Miami. He was promoted to defensive coordinator in 2000.

Wauford was arrested for shoving a fan who stormed the field in Marshall's last-second victory over Miami on November 12, 2002. He was suspended by the university and resigned in January 2003. The criminal charges against him were dropped on July 24, 2003.

Wauford was unable to find a college coaching job in 2003. He instead worked as special education teacher and assistant football coach at Clinton High School in his wife's hometown of Clinton, Iowa. In 2004, he returned to college football as the defensive line coach at Kent State.

In 2006, Wauford was the defensive coordinator at the University of Findlay. Head coach Dan Simrell resigned at the end of the season and Wauford was chosen to succeed him. He served as the head football coach at the University of Findlay from 2007 to 2010, compiling a record of 14–30.

After leaving Findlay, Wauford returned to Clinton High School. He became the school's the head football coach in 2015.

== Head coaching record ==
=== College ===
Year	Team	Overall	Conference	Standing	Bowl/playoffs
Findlay Oilers (Great Lakes Intercollegiate Athletic Conference) (2007–2010)
2007	Findlay	4–7	3–7	T–10th	
2008	Findlay	2–9	1–9	T–11th	
2009	Findlay	7–4	6–4	T–5th	
2010	Findlay	1–10	1–9	6th (South)	
Findlay:		14–30	11–29		
Total:		14–30			
