= 2001 Western Michigan Broncos football team =

American college football season

2001 Western Michigan Broncos football
- Conference: Mid-American Conference
- West Division
- Record: 5–6 (4–4 MAC)
- Head coach: Gary Darnell (5th season)
- Offensive coordinator: Brian Rock (2nd season)
- MVP: Bryan Lape
- Home stadium: Waldo Stadium

2001 Mid-American Conference football standings
	Div			Conf.			Overall
Team	W		L	W		L	W		L
East Division
Marshall x	6	–	0	8	–	0	11	–	2
Miami (OH)	4	–	2	6	–	2	7	–	5
Bowling Green	4	–	2	5	–	3	8	–	3
Kent State	3	–	3	5	–	3	6	–	5
Akron	3	–	3	4	–	4	4	–	7
Buffalo	1	–	5	1	–	7	3	–	8
Ohio	0	–	6	1	–	7	1	–	10
West Division
No. 23 Toledo xy$	4	–	1	5	–	2	10	–	2
Northern Illinois x	4	–	1	4	–	3	6	–	5
Ball State x	4	–	1	4	–	3	5	–	6
Western Michigan	2	–	3	4	–	4	5	–	6
Central Michigan	1	–	4	2	–	6	3	–	8
Eastern Michigan	0	–	5	1	–	6	2	–	9
Championship: Toledo 41, Marshall 36
$ – Conference champion; x – Division champion/co-champions; Due to an unbalanced conference schedule, the team with best division record within each division was awarded that division's championship game berth.; Rankings from AP Poll

The 2001 Western Michigan Broncos football team represented Western Michigan University in the Mid-American Conference (MAC) during the 2001 NCAA Division I-A football season. In their fifth season under head coach Gary Darnell, the Broncos compiled a 5–6 record (4–5 against MAC opponents), finished in fourth place in the MAC's West Division, and outscored their opponents, 277 to 266. The team played its home games at Waldo Stadium in Kalamazoo, Michigan.

The team's statistical leaders included Jeff Welsh with 1,702 passing yards, Philip Reed with 539 rushing yards, and Joshua Bush with 617 receiving yards.

== Schedule ==
Date	Time	Opponent	Site	TV	Result	Attendance	Source
August 31		No. 16 Illinois State*	Waldo Stadium; Kalamazoo, MI		W 48–7	33,976	
September 8	12:00 p.m.	at No. 9 Virginia Tech*	Lane Stadium; Blacksburg, VA	ESPN2	L 0–31	53,662	
September 22	12:10 p.m.	at No. 20 Michigan*	Michigan Stadium; Ann Arbor, MI	ESPN	L 21–38	109,837	
September 29	6:00 p.m.	at Eastern Michigan	Rynearson Stadium; Ypsilanti, MI		W 31–10	17,310	
October 6		Akron	Waldo Stadium; Kalamazoo, MI		W 31–14		
October 13	4:00 p.m.	Bowling Green	Waldo Stadium; Kalamazoo, MI		W 37–28	21,874	
October 20	2:00 p.m.	at Northern Illinois	Huskie Stadium; DeKalb, IL		L 12–20	18,150	
October 27	2:30 p.m.	at Miami (OH)	Yager Stadium; Oxford, OH	FSN	L 11–25	15,850	
November 6	8:00 p.m.	at Toledo	Glass Bowl; Toledo, OH	ESPN	L 35–41	23,923	
November 17		Central Michigan	Waldo Stadium; Kalamazoo, MI (rivalry)		W 20–17	23,112	
November 24		Ball State	Waldo Stadium; Kalamazoo, MI		L 31–35		
*Non-conference game; Rankings from AP Poll released prior to the game; All times are in Eastern time
