= 2001 Central Michigan Chippewas football team =

American college football season

2001 Central Michigan Chippewas football
- Conference: Mid-American Conference
- West Division
- Record: 3–8 (2–6 MAC)
- Head coach: Mike DeBord (2nd season)
- MVP: Terrence Jackson
- Home stadium: Kelly/Shorts Stadium

2001 Mid-American Conference football standings
| | Div | | | Conf. | | | Overall |
| Team | W | | L | W | | L | W | | L |
|---|---|---|---|---|---|---|---|---|---|
East Division
| Marshall x | 6 | – | 0 | 8 | – | 0 | 11 | – | 2 |
| Miami (OH) | 4 | – | 2 | 6 | – | 2 | 7 | – | 5 |
| Bowling Green | 4 | – | 2 | 5 | – | 3 | 8 | – | 3 |
| Kent State | 3 | – | 3 | 5 | – | 3 | 6 | – | 5 |
| Akron | 3 | – | 3 | 4 | – | 4 | 4 | – | 7 |
| Buffalo | 1 | – | 5 | 1 | – | 7 | 3 | – | 8 |
| Ohio | 0 | – | 6 | 1 | – | 7 | 1 | – | 10 |
West Division
| No. 23 Toledo xy$ | 4 | – | 1 | 5 | – | 2 | 10 | – | 2 |
| Northern Illinois x | 4 | – | 1 | 4 | – | 3 | 6 | – | 5 |
| Ball State x | 4 | – | 1 | 4 | – | 3 | 5 | – | 6 |
| Western Michigan | 2 | – | 3 | 4 | – | 4 | 5 | – | 6 |
| Central Michigan | 1 | – | 4 | 2 | – | 6 | 3 | – | 8 |
| Eastern Michigan | 0 | – | 5 | 1 | – | 6 | 2 | – | 9 |
Championship: Toledo 41, Marshall 36
$ – Conference champion; x – Division champion/co-champions; Due to an unbalanced conference schedule, the team with best division record within each division was awarded that division's championship game berth.; Rankings from AP Poll

The 2001 Central Michigan Chippewas football team was an American football team that represented Central Michigan University in the Mid-American Conference (MAC) during the 2001 NCAA Division I-A football season. In their second season under head coach Mike DeBord, the Chippewas compiled a 3–8 record (2–6 against MAC opponents), finished in fifth place in the MAC's West Division, and were outscored by their opponents, 346 to 251. The team played its home games in Kelly/Shorts Stadium in Mount Pleasant, Michigan, with attendance of 89,303 in five home games.

The team's statistical leaders included Derrick Vickers with 1,156 passing yards, Terrence Jackson with 1,194 rushing yards, and Rob Turner with 668 receiving yards. Halfback Terrence Jackson was also selected at the end of the 2001 season as the team's most valuable player. Cornerback Tedaro France was selected as a first-team All-MAC player.

== Schedule ==
| Date | Opponent | Site | Result | Attendance | Source |
|---|---|---|---|---|---|
| August 30 | Eastern Kentucky | Kelly/Shorts Stadium; Mount Pleasant, MI | W 42–28 | 18,613 | |
| September 8 | at Michigan State | Spartan Stadium; East Lansing, MI | L 21–35 | 73,879 | |
| September 22 | Toledo | Kelly/Shorts Stadium; Mount Pleasant, MI | L 28–52 | 27,413 | |
| September 29 | at Buffalo | University at Buffalo Stadium; Amherst, NY | W 16–8 | 10,930 | |
| October 13 | Ohio | Kelly/Shorts Stadium; Mount Pleasant, MI | L 3–34 | 18,010 | |
| October 20 | at Marshall | Marshall University Stadium; Huntington, WV | L 21–42 | 30,063 | |
| October 27 | Northern Illinois | Kelly/Shorts Stadium; Mount Pleasant, MI | L 24–33 | 10,643 | |
| November 3 | at Ball State | Scheumann Stadium; Muncie, IN | L 34–38 | 20,757 | |
| November 10 | Eastern Michigan | Kelly/Shorts Stadium; Mount Pleasant, MI (rivalry) | W 35–30 | 14,624 | |
| November 17 | at Western Michigan | Waldo Stadium; Kalamazoo, MI (rivalry) | L 17–20 | 23,112 | |
| November 24 | at Boise State | Bronco Stadium; Boise, ID | L 10–26 | 19,963 | |
