= 2001 Northern Iowa Panthers football team =

American college football season

2001 Northern Iowa Panthers football

Gateway champion

NCAA Division I-AA Semifinal, L 0–38 at Montana
- Conference: Gateway Football Conference

Ranking
- Sports Network: No. 4
- Record: 11–3 (6–1 Gateway)
- Head coach: Mark Farley (1st season)
- Offensive coordinator: Bill Salmon (1st season)
- Home stadium: UNI-Dome

2001 Gateway Football Conference standings
	Conf.			Overall
Team	W		L	W		L
No. 4 Northern Iowa $^	6	–	1	11	–	3
No. 12 Western Kentucky ^	5	–	2	8	–	4
No. 15 Youngstown State	5	–	2	8	–	3
Western Illinois	4	–	3	5	–	5
Southwest Missouri State	3	–	4	6	–	5
Indiana State	2	–	5	3	–	8
Illinois State	2	–	5	2	–	9
Southern Illinois	1	–	6	1	–	10
$ – Conference champion; ^ – NCAA Division I-AA playoff participant; Rankings from The Sports Network poll

The 2001 Northern Iowa Panthers football team was an American football team that represented the University of Northern Iowa as a member of the Gateway Football Conference (Gateway Conference) during the 2001 NCAA Division I-AA football season. In its first year under head coach Mark Farley, the team compiled an 11–3 record (6–1 in conference games), outscored opponents by a total of 377 to 340, and won the Gateway Conference championship. Northern Iowa advanced to the NCAA Division I-AA Football Championship playoffs, where the Panthers beat Eastern Illinois in the first round and Maine in the quarterfinals, before falling to eventual national champion Montana in the semifinals. Northern Iowa played home games at the UNI-Dome in Cedar Falls, Iowa. Farley was selected as the Gateway Conference and the Region 4 coach of the year.

Linebacker Adam Vogt and placekicker MacKenzie Hoambrecker were selected as a first-team players on one or more of the 2001 Division I-AA All-America teams. Vogt was also selected as the Gateway Conference defensive player of the year. Four Northern Iowa players were selected as first-team players on the 2001 all-Gateway Conference football team: Vogt; Hoambrecker; offensive lineman Chad Setterstrom; and wide receiver and punt returner Jake Soliday. Seven others were named to the second team. Vogt led the team with 160 total tackles, including 93 unassisted. Adam Benge gained 1,383 rushing yards and 2,015 all-purpose yards. Quarterback Tom Petrie was selected as the Gateway Conference freshman of the year. Brent Browner set a school record (since broken) with four blocked kicks in 2001.

The team played its home games at the UNI-Dome in Cedar Falls, Iowa.

== Schedule ==
Date	Time	Opponent	Rank	Site	Result	Attendance	Source
August 30	7:05 p.m.	Wayne State (MI)*	No. 23	UNI-Dome; Cedar Falls, IA	W 34–14	9,210	
September 8	6:30 p.m.	at Iowa State*	No. 24	Jack Trice Stadium; Ames, IA	L 0–45	47,092	
September 15	7:00 p.m.	at Stephen F. Austin*		Homer Bryce Stadium; Nacogdoches, TX	Canceled		
September 22		at Ball State*		Ball State Stadium; Muncie, IN	W 42–39		
September 29	4:05 p.m.	No. 2 Youngstown State*		UNI-Dome; Cedar Falls, IA	W 30–11	12,518	
October 6	2:30 p.m.	at Southwest Missouri State	No. 18	Plaster Sports Complex; Springfield, MO	W 27–3		
October 13	4:05 p.m.	Southern Illinois^{†}	No. 15	UNI-Dome; Cedar Falls, IA	W 19–14	13,455	
October 20	1:07 p.m.	at No. 12 Western Illinois	No. 14	Hanson Field; Macomb, IL	W 17–14	15,637	
October 27	2:30 p.m.	at Illinois State	No. 11	Hancock Stadium; Normal, IL	L 14–42	10,173	
November 3	4:05 p.m.	Indiana State	No. 16	UNI-Dome; Cedar Falls, IA	W 34–13		
November 10	4:00 p.m.	at No. 6 Western Kentucky	No. 15	L. T. Smith Stadium; Bowling Green, KY	W 24–23	10,300	
November 17	7:05 p.m.	Cal Poly	No. 8	UNI-Dome; Cedar Falls, IA	W 31–13		
December 1		at No. 3 Eastern Illinois*	No. 6	O'Brien Stadium; Charleston, IL (NCAA I-AA First Round)	W 49–43		
December 8	1:30 p.m.	No. 16 Maine*	No. 6	UNI-Dome; Cedar Falls, IA (NCAA Division I-AA Quarterfinal)	W 56–28	9,525	
December 15	1:00 p.m.	at No. 1 Montana*	No. 6	Washington–Grizzly Stadium; Missoula, MT (NCAA Division I-AA Semifinal)	L 0–38	18,848	
*Non-conference game; ^{†}Homecoming; Rankings from The Sports Network Poll released prior to the game; All times are in Central time
