= 2001 Bowling Green Falcons football team =

American college football season

2001 Bowling Green Falcons football
- Conference: Mid-American Conference
- East
- Record: 8–3 (5–3 MAC)
- Head coach: Urban Meyer (1st season)
- Offensive coordinator: Gregg Brandon (1st season)
- Offensive scheme: Spread
- Defensive coordinator: Tim Beckman (4th season)
- Base defense: 4–3
- Home stadium: Doyt Perry Stadium

2001 Mid-American Conference football standings
	Div			Conf.			Overall
Team	W		L	W		L	W		L
East Division
Marshall x	6	–	0	8	–	0	11	–	2
Miami (OH)	4	–	2	6	–	2	7	–	5
Bowling Green	4	–	2	5	–	3	8	–	3
Kent State	3	–	3	5	–	3	6	–	5
Akron	3	–	3	4	–	4	4	–	7
Buffalo	1	–	5	1	–	7	3	–	8
Ohio	0	–	6	1	–	7	1	–	10
West Division
No. 23 Toledo xy$	4	–	1	5	–	2	10	–	2
Northern Illinois x	4	–	1	4	–	3	6	–	5
Ball State x	4	–	1	4	–	3	5	–	6
Western Michigan	2	–	3	4	–	4	5	–	6
Central Michigan	1	–	4	2	–	6	3	–	8
Eastern Michigan	0	–	5	1	–	6	2	–	9
Championship: Toledo 41, Marshall 36
$ – Conference champion; x – Division champion/co-champions; Due to an unbalanced conference schedule, the team with best division record within each division was awarded that division's championship game berth.; Rankings from AP Poll

The 2001 Bowling Green Falcons football team represented Bowling Green State University in the 2001 NCAA Division I-A football season. The team was coached by Urban Meyer and played their home games in Doyt Perry Stadium in Bowling Green, Ohio. It was the 83rd season of play for the Falcons.

== Schedule ==
Date	Time	Opponent	Site	Result	Attendance	Source
September 1	7:30 pm	at Missouri*	Faurot Field; Columbia, MO	W 20–13	51,039	
September 8	6:00 pm	Buffalo	Doyt Perry Stadium; Bowling Green, OH	W 35–0	16,183	
September 22	6:00 pm	Temple*	Doyt Perry Stadium; Bowling Green, OH	W 42–23	11,029	
September 29	7:00 pm	at Marshall	Marshall University Stadium; Huntington, WV	L 31–37	32,034	
October 6	2:00 pm	Kent State	Doyt Perry Stadium; Bowling Green, OH (Anniversary Award)	W 24–7	12,539	
October 13	4:00 pm	at Western Michigan	Waldo Stadium; Kalamazoo, MI	L 28–37	21,874	
October 20	6:00 pm	at Akron	Rubber Bowl; Akron, OH	W 16–11	14,621	
November 3	4:00 pm	Miami (OH)	Doyt Perry Stadium; Bowling Green, OH	L 21–24	22,828	
November 10	1:00 pm	at Ohio	Peden Stadium; Athens, OH	W 17–0	15,724	
November 17	12:00 pm	at Northwestern*	Ryan Field; Evanston, IL	W 43–42	23,545	
November 23	7:00 pm	Toledo	Doyt Perry Stadium; Bowling Green, OH (rivalry)	W 56–21	26,483	
*Non-conference game; All times are in Eastern time
