= 2001 Northern Illinois Huskies football team =

American college football season

2001 Northern Illinois Huskies football

MAC West Division co-champion
- Conference: Mid-American Conference
- West Division
- Record: 6–5 (4–3 MAC)
- Head coach: Joe Novak (6th season)
- Offensive coordinator: Dan Roushar (4th season)
- MVPs: Darrell Hill; Nick Duffy
- Captains: Trent Clemen; Darrell Hill; Chris Finlen; Alan Rood; Larry Williams
- Home stadium: Huskie Stadium

2001 Mid-American Conference football standings
	Div			Conf.			Overall
Team	W		L	W		L	W		L
East Division
Marshall x	6	–	0	8	–	0	11	–	2
Miami (OH)	4	–	2	6	–	2	7	–	5
Bowling Green	4	–	2	5	–	3	8	–	3
Kent State	3	–	3	5	–	3	6	–	5
Akron	3	–	3	4	–	4	4	–	7
Buffalo	1	–	5	1	–	7	3	–	8
Ohio	0	–	6	1	–	7	1	–	10
West Division
No. 23 Toledo xy$	4	–	1	5	–	2	10	–	2
Northern Illinois x	4	–	1	4	–	3	6	–	5
Ball State x	4	–	1	4	–	3	5	–	6
Western Michigan	2	–	3	4	–	4	5	–	6
Central Michigan	1	–	4	2	–	6	3	–	8
Eastern Michigan	0	–	5	1	–	6	2	–	9
Championship: Toledo 41, Marshall 36
$ – Conference champion; x – Division champion/co-champions; Due to an unbalanced conference schedule, the team with best division record within each division was awarded that division's championship game berth.; Rankings from AP Poll

The 2001 Northern Illinois Huskies football team represented Northern Illinois University as a member of the West Division of the Mid-American Conference (MAC) during the 2001 NCAA Division I-A football season. Led by sixth-year head coach Joe Novak, the Huskies compiled an overall record of 6–5 with a mark of 4–3 in conference play, sharing the MAC's West Division title with Ball State and Toledo. Northern Illinois played home games at Huskie Stadium in DeKalb, Illinois.

== Schedule ==
Date	Time	Opponent	Site	TV	Result	Attendance	Source
August 30	6:30 pm	South Florida*	Huskie Stadium; DeKalb, IL		W 20–17	14,426	
September 8	11:00 am	at Illinois*	Memorial Stadium; Champaign, IL	ESPN Plus	L 12–17	45,674	
September 22	6:30 pm	Sam Houston State*	Huskie Stadium; DeKalb, IL		W 41–16	12,463	
September 29	6:00 pm	at No. 25 Toledo	Glass Bowl; Toledo OH		L 20–41	36,502	
October 6	1:00 pm	Marshall	Huskie Stadium; DeKalb, IL	ESPNGP	L 15–37	17,367	
October 13	1:00 pm	at Kent State	Dix Stadium; Kent, OH		L 34–44	2,973	
October 20	1:00 pm	Western Michigan	Huskie Stadium; DeKalb, IL		W 20–12	18,150	
October 27	12:00 pm	at Central Michigan	Kelly/Shorts Stadium; Mount Pleasant, MI	FSN	W 33–24	10,643	
November 3	2:00 pm	Eastern Michigan	Huskie Stadium; DeKalb, IL	FSN	W 40–17	13,421	
November 17	1:00 pm	Ball State	Huskie Stadium; DeKalb, IL (rivalry)		W 33–29	11,795	
November 24	12:00 pm	at Wake Forest*	Groves Stadium; Winston-Salem, NC		L 35–38	14,100	
*Non-conference game; Rankings from AP Poll released prior to the game; All times are in Central time
