= 2001 Connecticut Huskies football team =

American college football season

2001 Connecticut Huskies football
- Conference: Independent
- Record: 2–9
- Head coach: Randy Edsall (3rd season)
- Offensive coordinator: Jerry Franks (1st season)
- Offensive scheme: Multiple
- Defensive coordinator: Kent Briggs (1st season)
- Base defense: 4–3
- Home stadium: Memorial Stadium

2001 NCAA Division I-A independents football records
	Conf.			Overall
Team	W		L	W		L
South Florida		–		8	–	3
Troy State		–		7	–	4
UCF		–		6	–	5
Notre Dame		–		5	–	6
Utah State		–		4	–	7
Connecticut		–		2	–	9
Navy		–		0	–	10
Rankings from AP Poll

The 2001 Connecticut Huskies football team represented the University of Connecticut as an independent during the 2001 NCAA Division I-A football season. Led by third-year head coach Randy Edsall, the Huskies compiled a record of 2–9. This was the program's second season competing at the NCAA Division I-A level and its final one as a transitional team, having moved from NCAA Division I-AA after the 1999 season. The team played home games at Memorial Stadium in Storrs, Connecticut.

== Schedule ==
Date	Time	Opponent	Site	TV	Result	Attendance	Source
September 1	12:00 pm	at No. 9 Virginia Tech	Lane Stadium; Blacksburg, VA	ESPN Plus	L 10–52	53,662	
September 8	1:00 pm	Eastern Washington	Memorial Stadium; Storrs, CT		L 17–35	15,723	
September 22	1:00 pm	Buffalo	Memorial Stadium; Storrs, CT		L 20–37	16,517	
September 29	7:00 pm	at Rutgers	Rutgers Stadium; Piscataway, NJ		W 20–19	24,415	
October 6	1:00 pm	Eastern Michigan	Memorial Stadium; Storrs, CT		W 19–0	11,193	
October 13	7:00 pm	at South Florida	Raymond James Stadium; Tampa, FL		L 21–40	26,802	
October 27	1:30 pm	Ball State^{†}	Memorial Stadium; Storrs, CT		L 5–10	16,041	
November 3	1:00 pm	at Cincinnati	Nippert Stadium; Cincinnati, OH		L 28–45	17,588	
November 10	12:00 pm	Utah State	Memorial Stadium; Storrs, CT		L 31–38	13,207	
November 17	3:00 pm	at Middle Tennessee State	Johnny "Red" Floyd Stadium; Murfreesboro, TN		L 14–38	13,017	
November 24	12:00 pm	at Temple	Franklin Field; Philadelphia, PA		L 7–56	10,060	
^{†}Homecoming; Rankings from AP Poll released prior to the game; All times are in Eastern time
