= 2001 Buffalo Bulls football team =

American college football season

2001 Buffalo Bulls football
- Conference: Mid-American Conference
- East Division
- Record: 3–8 (1–7 MAC)
- Head coach: Jim Hofher (1st season)
- Captains: Joe Freedy; Bob Dzvonick; Craig Rohlfs; Duane Williams
- Home stadium: University at Buffalo Stadium

2001 Mid-American Conference football standings
	Div			Conf.			Overall
Team	W		L	W		L	W		L
East Division
Marshall x	6	–	0	8	–	0	11	–	2
Miami (OH)	4	–	2	6	–	2	7	–	5
Bowling Green	4	–	2	5	–	3	8	–	3
Kent State	3	–	3	5	–	3	6	–	5
Akron	3	–	3	4	–	4	4	–	7
Buffalo	1	–	5	1	–	7	3	–	8
Ohio	0	–	6	1	–	7	1	–	10
West Division
No. 23 Toledo xy$	4	–	1	5	–	2	10	–	2
Northern Illinois x	4	–	1	4	–	3	6	–	5
Ball State x	4	–	1	4	–	3	5	–	6
Western Michigan	2	–	3	4	–	4	5	–	6
Central Michigan	1	–	4	2	–	6	3	–	8
Eastern Michigan	0	–	5	1	–	6	2	–	9
Championship: Toledo 41, Marshall 36
$ – Conference champion; x – Division champion/co-champions; Due to an unbalanced conference schedule, the team with best division record within each division was awarded that division's championship game berth.; Rankings from AP Poll

The 2001 Buffalo Bulls football team represented the University at Buffalo as a member of the Mid-American Conference (MAC) during the 2001 NCAA Division I-AA football season. Led by first-year head coach Jim Hofher, the Bulls compiled an overall record of 3–8 with a mark of 1–7 in conference play, tying for sixth place at the bottom of the standings in the MAC's East Division. The team played home games at the University at Buffalo Stadium in Amherst, New York.

== Schedule ==
Date	Time	Opponent	Site	TV	Result	Attendance	Source
August 30	7:30 pm	Rutgers*	University at Buffalo Stadium; Amherst, NY	Empire	L 15–31	22,658	
September 8	6:00 pm	at Bowling Green	Doyt Perry Stadium; Bowling Green, OH		L 0–35	16,183	
September 22	1:00 pm	at Connecticut*	Memorial Stadium; Storrs, CT		W 37–20	16,517	
September 29	7:00 pm	Central Michigan	University at Buffalo Stadium; Amherst, NY		L 8–16	10,930	
October 6	2:00 pm	at Miami (OH)	Yager Stadium; Oxford, OH		L 14–31	20,108	
October 13	1:00 pm	Marshall	University at Buffalo Stadium; Amherst, NY	Empire	L 14–34	12,438	
October 20	2:00 pm	at Kent State	Dix Stadium; Kent, OH		L 13–35	8,260	
October 27	3:00 pm	at Eastern Michigan	Rynearson Stadium; Ypsilanti, MI		L 20–24	7,320	
November 3	1:00 pm	Ohio	University at Buffalo Stadium; Amherst, NY		W 44–0	7,419	
November 10	1:00 pm	at Army*	Michie Stadium; West Point, NY		W 26–19	26,883	
November 17	1:00 pm	Akron	University at Buffalo Stadium; Amherst, NY		L 14–41	7,811	
*Non-conference game; All times are in Eastern time
