= 2001 Eastern Michigan Eagles football team =

American college football season

2001 Eastern Michigan Eagles football
- Conference: Mid-American Conference
- West Division
- Record: 2–9 (1–6 MAC)
- Head coach: Jeff Woodruff (2nd season)
- Offensive coordinator: Pete Alamar (2nd season)
- MVP: Scott Russell
- Captains: Scott Russell; Scott Russell; Kenny Philpot; Cory Annett
- Home stadium: Rynearson Stadium

2001 Mid-American Conference football standings
	Div			Conf.			Overall
Team	W		L	W		L	W		L
East Division
Marshall x	6	–	0	8	–	0	11	–	2
Miami (OH)	4	–	2	6	–	2	7	–	5
Bowling Green	4	–	2	5	–	3	8	–	3
Kent State	3	–	3	5	–	3	6	–	5
Akron	3	–	3	4	–	4	4	–	7
Buffalo	1	–	5	1	–	7	3	–	8
Ohio	0	–	6	1	–	7	1	–	10
West Division
No. 23 Toledo xy$	4	–	1	5	–	2	10	–	2
Northern Illinois x	4	–	1	4	–	3	6	–	5
Ball State x	4	–	1	4	–	3	5	–	6
Western Michigan	2	–	3	4	–	4	5	–	6
Central Michigan	1	–	4	2	–	6	3	–	8
Eastern Michigan	0	–	5	1	–	6	2	–	9
Championship: Toledo 41, Marshall 36
$ – Conference champion; x – Division champion/co-champions; Due to an unbalanced conference schedule, the team with best division record within each division was awarded that division's championship game berth.; Rankings from AP Poll

The 2001 Eastern Michigan Eagles football team represented Eastern Michigan University in the 2001 NCAA Division I-A football season. In their second season under head coach Jeff Woodruff, the Eagles compiled a 2–9 record (1–6 against conference opponents), finished in last place in the West Division of the Mid-American Conference, and were outscored by their opponents, 356 to 197. The team's statistical leaders included Kainoa Akina with 1,504 passing yards, Chris R. Roberson with 755 rushing yards, and Kevin Walter with 748 receiving yards. Scott Russell received the team's most valuable player award.

== Schedule ==
Date	Time	Opponent	Site	TV	Result	Attendance	Source
September 1	6:00 p.m.	Southeast Missouri State*	Rynearson Stadium; Ypsilanti, MI		W 16–12	16,428	
September 8	6:00 p.m.	at Maryland*	Byrd Stadium; College Park, MD		L 3–50	42,105	
September 22	6:00 p.m.	Indiana State*	Rynearson Stadium; Ypsilanti, MI		L 14–21	13,901	
September 29	6:00 p.m.	Western Michigan	Rynearson Stadium; Ypsilanti, MI		L 10–31	17,310	
October 6	1:00 p.m.	at Connecticut*	Memorial Stadium; Storrs, CT		L 0–19	11,193	
October 13	6:00 p.m.	Ball State	Rynearson Stadium; Ypsilanti, MI		L 14–35	11,423	
October 27	3:00 p.m.	Buffalo	Rynearson Stadium; Ypsilanti, MI		W 24–20	7,320	
November 3	2:00 p.m.	at Northern Illinois	Huskie Stadium; DeKalb, IL	FSN	L 17–40	13,421	
November 10	1:00 p.m.	at Central Michigan	Kelly/Shorts Stadium; Mount Pleasant, MI (rivalry)		L 30–35	14,624	
November 17	7:00 p.m.	at Toledo	Glass Bowl; Toledo, OH		L 7–28	27,831	
November 24	6:00 p.m.	at Akron	Rubber Bowl; Akron, OH		L 62–65 ^{3OT}	6,019	
*Non-conference game; All times are in Eastern time

== MAC leaders ==
Kainoa Akina

- 14 Passing Touchdowns (4th)
- 11 Passing Interceptions (4th)

Chris Roberson

- 167 Rush Attempts (3rd)
- 190 Plays From Scrimmage (5th)

Kevin Walter

- 62 Receptions (Tied 4th)
- 6 Receiving Touchdowns (Tied 4th)
- All-MAC Honorable Mention

David Rysko

- 88 Punts (1st)
- 3,152 Punting Yards (1st)

Erick Middleton

- 3 Interceptions (Tied 3rd)

Scott Russell

- Second Team All-MAC Defense

Kenny Philpot

- Second Team All-MAC Defense
