= 2001 Ohio Bobcats football team =

American college football season

2001 Ohio Bobcats football
- Conference: Mid-American Conference
- East
- Record: 1–10 (1–7 MAC)
- Head coach: Brian Knorr (1st season)
- Offensive coordinator: Greg Gregory (1st season)
- Defensive coordinator: Tim Kish (1st season)
- Home stadium: Peden Stadium

2001 Mid-American Conference football standings
	Div			Conf.			Overall
Team	W		L	W		L	W		L
East Division
Marshall x	6	–	0	8	–	0	11	–	2
Miami (OH)	4	–	2	6	–	2	7	–	5
Bowling Green	4	–	2	5	–	3	8	–	3
Kent State	3	–	3	5	–	3	6	–	5
Akron	3	–	3	4	–	4	4	–	7
Buffalo	1	–	5	1	–	7	3	–	8
Ohio	0	–	6	1	–	7	1	–	10
West Division
No. 23 Toledo xy$	4	–	1	5	–	2	10	–	2
Northern Illinois x	4	–	1	4	–	3	6	–	5
Ball State x	4	–	1	4	–	3	5	–	6
Western Michigan	2	–	3	4	–	4	5	–	6
Central Michigan	1	–	4	2	–	6	3	–	8
Eastern Michigan	0	–	5	1	–	6	2	–	9
Championship: Toledo 41, Marshall 36
$ – Conference champion; x – Division champion/co-champions; Due to an unbalanced conference schedule, the team with best division record within each division was awarded that division's championship game berth.; Rankings from AP Poll

The 2001 Ohio Bobcats football team represented Ohio University during the 2001 NCAA Division I-A football season. Ohio competed as a member of the Mid-American Conference (MAC) in the East Division. The Bobcats were led by first year Brian Knorr who had previously been the defensive coordinator under Jim Grobe. They played their home games in Peden Stadium in Athens, Ohio.

== Schedule ==
Date	Time	Opponent	Site	TV	Result	Attendance	Source
August 30	7:00 pm	at Akron	Rubber Bowl; Akron, OH		L 29–31	13,532	
September 8	1:00 pm	at West Virginia*	Mountaineer Field; Morgantown, WV		L 3–20	52,995	
September 22	1:00 pm	Iowa State*	Peden Stadium; Athens, OH		L 28–31	24,000	
October 6	6:00 pm	No. 23 Toledo	Peden Stadium; Athens, OH		L 41–48	21,918	
October 13	1:00 pm	at Central Michigan	Kelly/Shorts Stadium; Mount Pleasant, MI		W 34–3	18,010	
October 20	3:00 pm	Miami (OH)	Peden Stadium; Athens, OH (Battle of the Bricks)	FSN	L 24–36	23,427	
October 27	1:00 pm	Kent State^{†}	Peden Stadium; Athens, OH		L 14–24	19,415	
November 3	1:00 pm	at Buffalo	University at Buffalo Stadium; Amherst, NY		L 0–44	7,419	
November 10	1:00 pm	Bowling Green	Peden Stadium; Athens, OH		L 0–17	15,724	
November 17	3:00 pm	at No. 24 Marshall	Marshall University Stadium; Huntington, WV (Battle for the Bell)		L 18–42	24,932	
November 24	1:00 pm	at NC State*	Carter–Finley Stadium; Raleigh, NC		L 7–27	38,025	
*Non-conference game; ^{†}Homecoming; Rankings from AP Poll released prior to the game; All times are in Eastern time
