= 2001 NCAA Division I-A football season =

American college football season

2001 NCAA Division I-A season
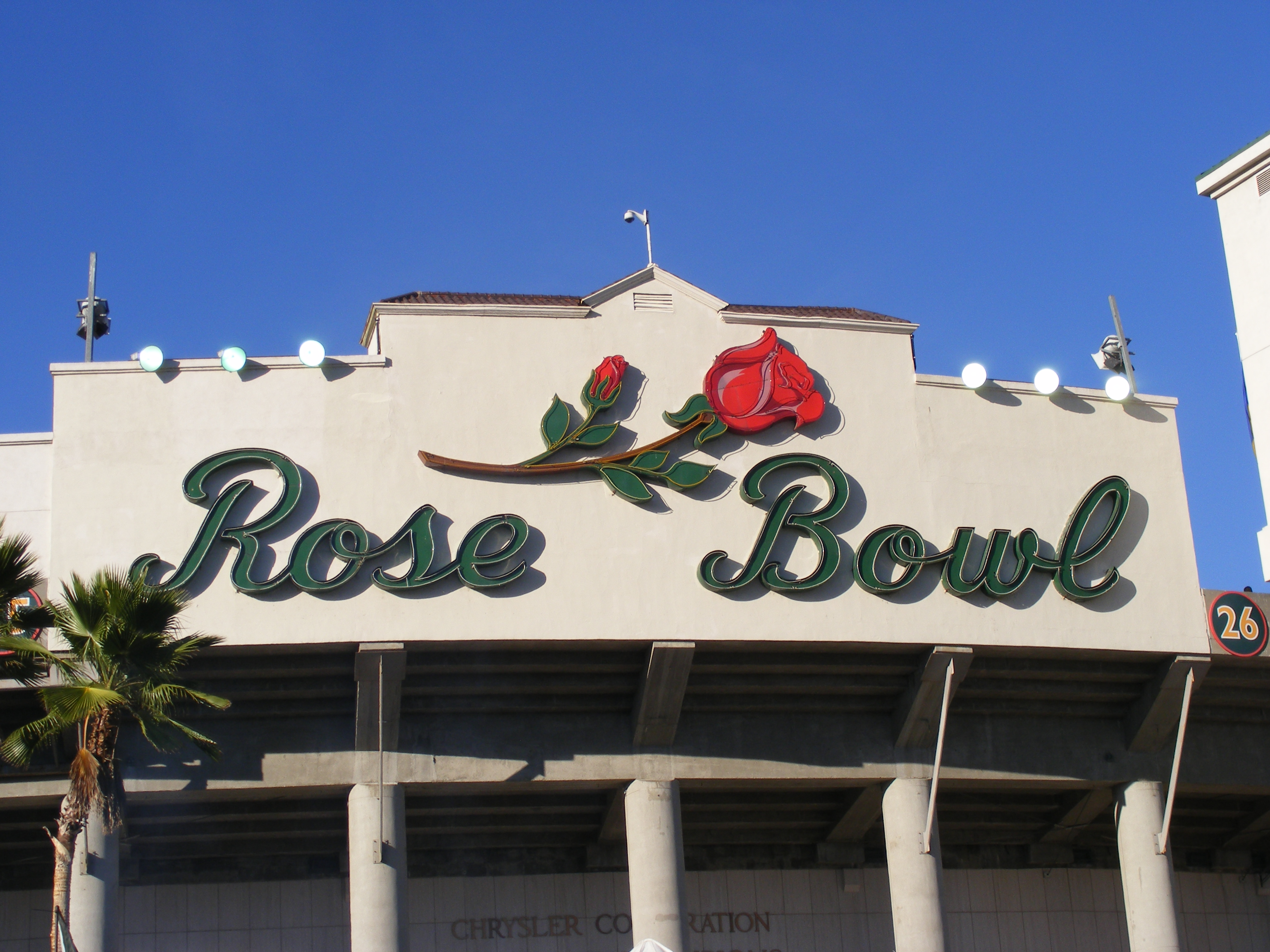
- The Rose Bowl stadium was the site of the BCS National Championship Game for the 2001 season.
- Number of teams: 117
- Preseason AP No. 1: Florida

Postseason
- Duration: December 18, 2001 – January 3, 2002
- Bowl games: 25
- Heisman Trophy: Nebraska quarterback Eric Crouch

Bowl Championship Series
- 2002 Rose Bowl
- Site: Rose Bowl Stadium, Pasadena, California
- Champion(s): Miami (FL)

Division I-A football seasons
- ← 2000 2002 →

The 2001 NCAA Division I-A football season was the first college football season of the 21st century. It ended with the University of Miami winning the national title for the fifth time.

The Hurricanes were led by Larry Coker, who was in his first year as head coach after five years as Miami's offensive coordinator under Butch Davis and became the first head coach since 1989's Dennis Erickson from the University of Miami to win a national title in his first season. Coker had the benefit of inheriting a star-studded program that Davis had rebuilt in the aftermath of NCAA sanctions in the mid-to-late '90s. Miami completed a perfect 12–0 season, which culminated in a 37–14 win over Nebraska in the Rose Bowl BCS National Championship Game.

In yet another controversial season for the BCS, (AP) No. 4 Nebraska was chosen as the national title opponent despite not having even played in the Big 12 championship game. The Huskers went into their last regularly scheduled game at Colorado undefeated, but left Boulder having lost the game by a score of 62–36. The Buffaloes went on to win the Big 12 championship game. The BCS computers, among other things, didn't weigh later games any more heavily than earlier games, and one-loss Nebraska came out ahead of two-loss No. 3 Colorado and one-loss, No. 2 Oregon. Some fans chanted "number 4" at the title game held at the Rose Bowl.

Florida State did not win the ACC championship for the first time since joining the conference in 1991, losing out to Maryland. Steve Spurrier left the Florida Gators at the end of the season to coach the Washington Redskins, accepting what was then the largest salary for an NFL head coach.

The season had one of the more competitive Heisman Trophy races with Eric Crouch of Nebraska winning by only a small margin over Rex Grossman of Florida. All of the five finalists played the quarterback position. Two of the finalists were coached at some point by Oregon offensive coordinator Jeff Tedford. Indiana quarterback Antwaan Randle El earned first-team All-America honors from the FWAA after becoming the first NCAA Division I-A quarterback to throw for 40 touchdowns and rush for 40 touchdowns in a career. He also became the first player in NCAA I-A history to record 2,500 total yards from scrimmage in four consecutive seasons.

Joe Paterno needed just 2 victories to pass legendary Alabama Coach Paul "Bear" Bryant as the winningest coach in Division I-A college football, However, after the Nittany Lions started the season 0–4 it looked like Bear Bryant's record would remain intact for at least 1 more year. After a 20–0 drubbing Penn State took against Michigan at home on Oct 6, the Nittany Lions were a dismal 1–6 since Paterno notched his 321st coaching win on October 28, 2000.

At Northwestern on October 20, the Lions lost a late 31–28 lead to fall behind 35–31 with two minutes to go. With their starting quarterback, Matt Senneca, out with an injury, Penn State put its collective hopes on the shoulders of redshirt freshman quarterback Zack Mills. Mills drove the Lions 69 yards in 1:41, leading Penn State to its first victory of the year by a 38–35 margin. The victory gave Paterno 323 career wins, tying Bear Bryant's record.

A week later, Penn State hosted Ohio State, who held on to a small lead for most of the game until the Buckeyes started to pull away with a 27–9 lead following a 44-yard interception return for a touchdown by Derek Ross in the third quarter. Penn State would fight back with a 69-yard touchdown run by Mills and a 26-yard pass to Tony Johnson to cut the lead to 27–22, and they would take the lead early in the fourth quarter with a 13-yard touchdown pass to Eric McCoo. Penn State's 29–27 win moved Paterno in to first place on the all-time coaching victories list with 324 wins. He would later slip behind Bobby Bowden at Florida State, but he would relinquish the top spot a few years later. Paterno remains the winningest coach in Division I-A college football with a final record of 409–136–3.

The newly formed Boise State/Fresno State rivalry would be a major factor in the race to be the "BCS buster" for several seasons. Both teams ultimately lost the race to Utah, who became the first to bust the BCS in 2004, and the first to make a second trip in 2008.

The Aloha Bowl and Oahu Bowl lost funding after Chrysler Corporation, which owned the former bowl's sponsor of Jeep, was acquired by Daimler-Benz and became DaimlerChrysler. The Aloha Bowl moved to Seattle and became the Seattle Bowl.

The New Orleans Bowl was first held, the host team being the Sun Belt Conference champion.

== End of season upsets and BCS drama ==
The final three weeks of the regular season saw an incredible amount of drama as several teams were in prime position to earn their way to the national championship game in the Rose Bowl. For most of November, Miami and Nebraska were the only two undefeated teams in the power conferences and clearly the top contenders for the title. But on November 23, the day after Thanksgiving, Nebraska suffered a devastating 62–36 loss to Colorado which seemingly caused their season to fall by the wayside. Conference rival Oklahoma had been ranked third behind Nebraska and Miami in the BCS standings, but the Sooners' hopes dissolved the next day when they were upset at home by Oklahoma State 16–13. These losses affected not only the national championship race but also the Big 12 standings, as the conference championship game would now feature Texas and Colorado instead of the expected Nebraska-Oklahoma matchup.

Miami, Florida, and Texas now held the top three spots in the BCS standings heading into their games on December 1, but all three teams would be pushed to the brink in a single thrilling day. Miami barely escaped Virginia Tech 26–24 to finish as the only undefeated team in the nation and clinch a Rose Bowl berth. However, the other clubs were not so fortunate. Florida lost 34–32 to Tennessee in Gainesville; as with Nebraska and Oklahoma, the loss not only ended the Gators' national championship dreams but also kept them out of the conference title game. Later that evening, Texas entered the Big 12 finals against Colorado in prime time television knowing that a win would almost certainly seal their spot in the Rose Bowl, but the Longhorns fell 39–37 in yet another nailbiter.

After their victory over Florida, Tennessee stepped into the number two spot going into the following week's SEC Championship against LSU. However, the Volunteers felt the same sting that Nebraska, Oklahoma, Florida, and Texas had all encountered the previous few weeks. After a 31–20 upset by the Tigers, Tennessee's hopes of National Championship appearance were gone as quickly as they had come.

Miami was left at the top of all the polls, and the debate began about who deserved to play in the Rose Bowl. Many felt Colorado was the hottest team in the country after dismantling Nebraska and then beating the Longhorns in the Big 12 title game, but their two losses at the beginning of the year were tough to ignore. Others felt Oregon deserved the honor, being ranked in both the AP and Coaches' Polls as the number two team in the country. Ultimately, after all of the upsets, Nebraska ended up as the number two team in the BCS, despite being the team whose loss started all of the drama three weeks earlier.

== Rules changes ==
The NCAA Rules Committee adopted the following rules changes for the 2001 season:

- Charged team time-outs are reduced to 30 seconds if the team taking the time-out requests it. Otherwise, team time-outs are 90 seconds in length.
- Eliminated TV/Radio time-outs during overtime periods.
- All penalties committed by the offense behind the neutral zone are enforced from the previous spot, completely repealing the 1991 rule that enforced offensive holding, clipping, and illegal use of hands occurring behind the line from the spot of the foul.
- Stopping the clock once a runner's helmet comes off.
- Runners are exempt from being called for hurdling.
- Roughing the passer penalties committed during a two-point conversion will be assessed on the ensuing kickoff or, if committed during overtime, on the succeeding spot.
- Guidelines for officials on lightning-related game issues are included in the rulebook.

== Conference and program changes ==
One team upgraded from Division I-AA, thus increasing the number of Division I-A schools from 116 to 117.

- The Big West Conference stopped sponsoring football after the 2000 season. Its remaining football-playing members departed for the WAC, the Sun Belt (see below), or independence:
  - Boise State joined the WAC
  - Utah State opted to become an Independent.
- The Sun Belt Conference, previously a non-football conference, began sponsoring football during the 2001 season, absorbing many of the Big West's former members.
  - Arkansas State, New Mexico State and North Texas joined from the Big West.
  - Idaho joined the Sun Belt as a football-only member
  - Louisiana–Lafayette, Louisiana–Monroe, and Middle Tennessee joined after playing as independents.
- TCU joined Conference USA from the Western Athletic Conference
- Louisiana Tech joined the Western Athletic Conference after five years as an independent.
- Two teams joined Division I-A football this season: South Florida and Troy State.

School	2000 Conference	2001 Conference
Arkansas State Indians	Big West	Sun Belt
Boise State Broncos	Big West	WAC
Idaho Vandals	Big West	Sun Belt
Louisiana–Lafayette Ragin' Cajuns	I-A Independent	Sun Belt
Louisiana–Monroe Warhawks	I-A Independent	Sun Belt
Louisiana Tech Bulldogs	I-A Independent	WAC
Middle Tennessee Blue Raiders	I-A Independent	Sun Belt
New Mexico State Aggies	Big West	Sun Belt
North Texas Mean Green	Big West	Sun Belt
South Florida Bulls	I-AA Independent	I-A Independent
TCU Horned Frogs	WAC	Conference USA
Troy State Trojans	I-AA Independent	I-A Independent
Utah State Aggies	Big West	I-A Independent

== Regular season ==
=== August–September ===
The preseason AP Poll was led by Florida at No. 1 and Miami at No. 2, followed by three consecutive Big 12 teams: defending champion Oklahoma at No. 3, Nebraska at No. 4, and Texas at No. 5.

August 25: No. 3 Oklahoma defeated North Carolina 41-27 in the Hispanic College Fund Football Classic, while No. 4 Nebraska beat Texas Christian 21-7 in the Pigskin Classic. The other leading teams had not yet begun their schedules, and the top five remained the same in the next poll.

September 1: All of the top five teams won easily: No. 1 Florida defeated Marshall 49-14, No. 2 Miami won 33-7 at Penn State, No. 3 Oklahoma visited Air Force for a 44-3 victory, No. 4 Nebraska beat Troy State 42-14, and No. 5 Texas won 41-7 over New Mexico State. Miami moved to the top of the next AP Poll: No. 1 Miami, No. 2 Florida, No. 3 Oklahoma, No. 4 Texas, and No. 5 Nebraska. Florida held onto the top spot in the Coaches Poll.

September 8: The top teams continued to dominate their opponents. No. 1 Miami shut out Rutgers 61-0, No. 2 Florida beat Louisiana-Monroe 55-6, No. 3 Oklahoma defeated North Texas 37-10, No. 4 Texas won 44-14 over North Carolina, and No. 5 Nebraska was a 27-10 winner over No. 17 Notre Dame. Miami now held the No. 1 spot in both polls, followed in the AP rankings by No. 2 Florida, No. 3 Oklahoma, No. 4 Nebraska, and No. 5 Texas.

Games scheduled for September 15 were postponed due to the terrorist attacks four days earlier. One of the affected games was a SEC matchup between No. 2 Florida and No. 8 Tennessee, which was rescheduled for early December and ended up having a major effect on the national championship picture.

September 20-22: No. 1 Miami was idle. No. 2 Florida belatedly opened conference play with a 44-10 win at Kentucky. No. 3 Oklahoma was also idle. No. 4 Nebraska breezed past Rice 48-3, and No. 5 Texas won 53-26 at Houston. The top five remained the same in the next AP Poll.

September 27-29: No. 1 Miami visited Pittsburgh for a 43-21 win. No. 2 Florida blanked No. 21 Mississippi State 52-0. No. 3 Oklahoma nearly blew a 21-point second-half lead but held on for a 38-37 nailbiter over No. 11 Kansas State. No. 4 Nebraska won 36-3 at Missouri, and No. 5 Texas beat Texas Tech 42-7. The top five again remained the same.

=== October ===
October 6: No. 1 Miami beat Troy State 38-7, but the AP voters were more impressed by No. 2 Florida’s 44-15 defeat of No. 18 LSU. No. 3 Oklahoma squared off against No. 5 Texas in the Red River Shootout, and the Longhorns were kept out of the end zone in a 14-3 Sooners win. No. 4 Nebraska won 48-14 over Iowa State, and No. 7 Oregon blasted Arizona 63-28. The next AP Poll featured No. 1 Florida, No. 2 Miami, No. 3 Oklahoma, No. 4 Nebraska, and No. 5 Oregon, with Miami retaining first place in the Coaches Poll.

October 13: No. 1 Florida fell 23-20 to Auburn on a Tigers field goal with time running out. The rivalry between No. 2 Miami and No. 14 Florida State often produced nail-biting finishes, but this time the Hurricanes pulled away in the second half on their way to a 49-27 victory. No. 3 Oklahoma won 38-10 at Kansas, No. 4 Nebraska was a 48-7 victor at Baylor, No. 5 Oregon beat California by the same 48-7 margin, and No. 7 UCLA prevailed 35-13 over No. 10 Washington. Miami returned to the No. 1 spot in both polls, followed by No. 2 Oklahoma, No. 3 Nebraska, No. 4 UCLA, and No. 5 Oregon.

October 20: No. 1 Miami was idle. No. 2 Oklahoma defeated Baylor 33-17. No. 3 Nebraska was tied at the half with Texas Tech, but the Cornhuskers ultimately managed a 41-31 victory. No. 4 UCLA beat California 51-17. No. 5 Oregon led Stanford by two touchdowns at the start of the fourth quarter, but the Cardinal made a furious comeback to defeat the Ducks 49-42. No. 6 Virginia Tech was idle but moved up in the next poll: No. 1 Miami, No. 2 Oklahoma, No. 3 Nebraska, No. 4 UCLA, and No. 5 Virginia Tech. The year’s first BCS standings were released this week, and the computers placed Oklahoma in the top spot with Miami in fourth place.

October 25-27: No. 1 Miami, lauded by the pollsters but snubbed by the BCS, improved their resume by blasting West Virginia 45-3. The biggest game of the week took place in Lincoln between No. 2 Oklahoma and No. 3 Nebraska, and the Cornhuskers broke open a defensive struggle with a trick play for a 63-yard touchdown pass and a 20-10 victory. No. 20 Stanford pulled off their second upset in a row, 38-28 over No. 4 UCLA. In another surprise, No. 5 Virginia Tech fell 22-14 to Syracuse. No. 6 Florida beat No. 15 Georgia 24-10, and No. 7 Texas won 35-16 at Missouri. With several undefeated teams losing this week, Miami and Nebraska were now the only two teams in the power conferences without a loss. The AP’s top five were No. 1 Miami, No. 2 Nebraska, No. 3 Oklahoma, No. 4 Florida, and No. 5 Texas, while the BCS ranked Nebraska at the top and put Michigan (AP No. 6) in place of Florida.

=== November ===
November 3: There was little competition at the top this week. No. 1 Miami shut out Temple 38-0, No. 2 Nebraska won 51-7 at Kansas, No. 3 Oklahoma rebounded from their loss to the Cornhuskers by blanking Tulsa 58-0, No. 4 Florida beat Vanderbilt 71-13, and No. 5 Texas visited Baylor for a 49-10 win. The AP’s top five remained the same; with Michigan losing to Michigan State on a controversial last-second play, the BCS elevated AP No. 6 Tennessee into the Wolverines’ No. 4 spot.

November 10: No. 1 Miami found themselves in deep trouble against unranked Boston College, clinging to a five-point lead as the Eagles had a first-and-goal at the Hurricanes’ nine-yard line with 30 seconds left. But a Boston College pass was deflected to Miami’s Matt Walters, who handed off to Ed Reed for an 80-yard touchdown return which clinched an 18-7 Hurricanes victory. No. 2 Nebraska trailed at the half but came back to beat Kansas State 31-21. No. 3 Oklahoma defeated Texas A&M 31-10, No. 4 Florida won 54-17 at No. 14 South Carolina, and No. 5 Texas shut out Kansas 59-0. The AP’s top five again remained the same. Despite the Longhorns’ big win, the BCS dropped Tennessee and Texas from their top five in favor of Oregon (AP No. 7) and Florida.

November 17: No. 1 Miami hosted No. 14 Syracuse, with the winner guaranteed at least a share of the Big East title. Recovering from last week’s close call, the Hurricanes overwhelmed their opponents 59-0. No. 2 Nebraska was idle. No. 3 Oklahoma won 30-13 at Texas Tech, No. 4 Florida defeated No. 21 Florida State 37-13, and No. 5 Texas was also idle. The next top five was No. 1 Miami, No. 2 Nebraska, No. 3 Florida, No. 4 Oklahoma, and No. 5 Texas.

November 23-24: Miami and Nebraska, the only undefeated teams in the major conferences, had held the top two spots in the polls throughout November. On Thanksgiving weekend, No. 1 Miami maintained their standard by blasting No. 12 Washington 65-7. However, No. 2 Nebraska received a major shock from No. 14 Colorado. The Buffaloes raced out to a 35-3 lead in the second quarter and cruised to a 62-36 victory, scoring the most points by any opponent in Cornhuskers history (including a record six touchdowns by running back Chris Brown). Since Colorado only had one conference loss, the two teams finished tied atop the Big 12 North and the head-to-head tiebreaker kept Nebraska out of the conference championship game. The Big 12 South title was decided in an equally surprising manner. No. 4 Oklahoma came into their rivalry game against Oklahoma State having outscored their last three opponents 119-23, while the Cowboys had a record of just 3-7. But the two teams engaged in a hard-fought defensive struggle until backup quarterback (and future major league baseball player) Josh Fields led Oklahoma State on a late drive which ended in a touchdown pass and a 16-13 Cowboys win. This opened the door for No. 5 Texas, who earned the right to face Colorado with a 21-7 victory at Texas A&M. No. 3 Florida and No. 6 Oregon were idle, but the chaos in the Big 12 allowed both teams to move up in the next poll. No. 7 Tennessee got the same benefit after shutting out Vanderbilt 38-0. The AP’s new top five were No. 1 Miami, No. 2 Florida, No. 3 Texas, No. 4 Oregon, and No. 5 Tennessee; the BCS agreed on the top three but kept Nebraska in the running at No. 4.

=== December ===
December 1: The late-season drama continued as each of the top five teams played a game decided by three points or less. No. 1 Miami led 20-3 at the half and 26-10 in the fourth quarter, but No. 14 Virginia Tech scored a touchdown, passed for a two-point conversion, and took a blocked punt back 59 yards for another score. This time the Hokies failed to convert the two-point play, leaving the score at 26-24. Virginia Tech got the ball back once more, but Ed Reed made his second game-saving play in less than a month with an interception that sealed Miami’s perfect regular season. No. 2 Florida matched up against No. 5 Tennessee in the game that was delayed due to the September 11 attacks, playing for the SEC East title and a berth in the conference championship game. In a back-and-forth contest with several lead changes, a missed two-point conversion again made the difference as Florida cut the score to 34-32 with 86 seconds left but failed to complete the two-point pass. With the Gators out of the way, No. 3 Texas could earn a shot at the title by winning the Big 12 Championship Game. The Longhorns had beaten No. 9 Colorado 41-7 in October, but this time the Buffaloes rushed out to a 29-10 lead in the second quarter as Texas quarterback Chris Simms committed four turnovers before leaving with an injured finger. Major Applewhite, the Longhorns’ starting QB in 1998 and 1999 who had lost his job to Simms, led the team on a furious comeback that fell just short, with Colorado winning a 39-37 decision for their second shocking upset in as many weeks. Having already clinched at least a share of the Pac-10 title, No. 5 Oregon won the conference outright in a 17-14 defensive struggle against rival Oregon State. No. 6 Nebraska had finished their schedule, but they moved up in the next AP Poll: No. 1 Miami, No. 2 Tennessee, No. 3 Oregon, No. 4 Colorado, and No. 5 Nebraska. However, the BCS ranked Nebraska at No. 3 ahead of Colorado and Oregon.

December 8: No. 2 Tennessee was in the driver’s seat for a national title berth as they matched up against No. 21 LSU in the SEC Championship Game. Just like Texas in the Big 12 title game, the Volunteers were playing an opponent they’d defeated earlier in the year. And, just like Texas, they flubbed the opportunity: LSU scored two fourth-quarter touchdowns for a 31-20 comeback win that gave coach Nick Saban his first championship of a major conference. The final AP Poll featured No. 1 Miami, No. 2 Oregon, No. 3 Colorado, No. 4 Nebraska, and No. 5 Florida—but the BCS had different plans.

Undefeated No. 1 Miami was an obvious choice to play for the national championship in the Rose Bowl, but deciding their opponent was a more difficult matter. In the last three weeks of the season, five teams ranked No. 2 or No. 3—Nebraska, Oklahoma, Florida, Texas, and Tennessee—had suffered upset losses when they were in the driver’s seat for a berth in the title game. In a controversial decision, the BCS computers selected Nebraska despite Oregon’s No. 2 ranking in both human polls and Colorado’s 26-point win over the Cornhuskers. The Ducks and Buffaloes ended up playing each other in the Fiesta Bowl. No. 5 Florida got an at-large BCS berth and faced No. 6 Maryland, the ACC champion, in the Orange Bowl; the Big Ten and SEC winners, No. 7 Illinois and No. 12 LSU, squared off in the Sugar Bowl.

== Regular season top 10 matchups ==
Rankings reflect the AP Poll. Rankings for Week 8 and beyond will list BCS Rankings first and AP Poll second. Teams that failed to be a top 10 team for one poll or the other will be noted.

- Week 5
  - No. 3 Oklahoma defeated No. 5 Texas, 14–3 (Cotton Bowl, Dallas, Texas)
- Week 6
  - No. 7 UCLA defeated No. 10 Washington, 35–13 (Rose Bowl, Pasadena, California)
- Week 8
  - No. 2/3 Nebraska defeated No. 1/2 Oklahoma, 20–10 (Memorial Stadium, Lincoln, Nebraska)
- Week 13
  - No. 6/5 Tennessee defeated No. 2/2 Florida, 34–32 (Ben Hill Griffin Stadium, Gainesville, Florida)
  - No. 7/9 Colorado defeated No. 3/3 Texas, 39–37 (2001 Big 12 Championship Game, Texas Stadium, Irving, Texas)

== Conference standings ==
2001 Atlantic Coast Conference football standings
	Conf.			Overall
Team	W		L	W		L
No. 11 Maryland $	7	–	1	10	–	2
No. 15 Florida State	6	–	2	8	–	4
North Carolina	5	–	3	8	–	5
Clemson	4	–	4	7	–	5
No. 24 Georgia Tech	4	–	4	8	–	5
NC State	4	–	4	7	–	5
Wake Forest	3	–	5	6	–	5
Virginia	3	–	5	5	–	7
Duke	0	–	8	0	–	11
$ – BCS representative as conference champion; Rankings from AP Poll

2001 Big 12 Conference football standings
	Conf.			Overall
Team	W		L	W		L
North Division
No. 9 Colorado xy$	7	–	1	10	–	3
No. 8 Nebraska x%	7	–	1	11	–	2
Iowa State	4	–	4	7	–	5
Kansas State	3	–	5	6	–	6
Missouri	3	–	5	4	–	7
Kansas	1	–	7	3	–	8
South Division
No. 5 Texas xy	7	–	1	11	–	2
No. 6 Oklahoma	6	–	2	11	–	2
Texas Tech	4	–	4	7	–	5
Texas A&M	4	–	4	8	–	4
Oklahoma State	2	–	6	4	–	7
Baylor	0	–	8	3	–	8
Championship: Colorado 39, Texas 37
$ – BCS representative as conference champion; % – BCS at-large representative; x – Division champion/co-champions; y – Championship game participant; Rankings from AP Poll

2001 Big East Conference football standings
	Conf.			Overall
Team	W		L	W		L
No. 1 Miami (FL) $#	7	–	0	12	–	0
No. 14 Syracuse	6	–	1	10	–	3
No. 18 Virginia Tech	4	–	3	8	–	4
No. 21 Boston College	4	–	3	8	–	4
Pittsburgh	4	–	3	7	–	5
Temple	2	–	5	4	–	7
West Virginia	1	–	6	3	–	8
Rutgers	0	–	7	2	–	9
# – BCS National Champion; $ – BCS representative as conference champion; Rankings from AP poll

2001 Big Ten Conference football standings
	Conf.			Overall
Team	W		L	W		L
No. 12 Illinois $	7	–	1	10	–	2
No. 20 Michigan	6	–	2	8	–	4
Ohio State	5	–	3	7	–	5
Iowa	4	–	4	7	–	5
Purdue	4	–	4	6	–	6
Penn State	4	–	4	5	–	6
Indiana	4	–	4	5	–	6
Michigan State	3	–	5	7	–	5
Wisconsin	3	–	5	5	–	7
Minnesota	2	–	6	4	–	7
Northwestern	2	–	6	4	–	7
$ – BCS representative as conference champion; Rankings from AP Poll

2001 Conference USA football standings
	Conf.			Overall
Team	W		L	W		L
No. 17 Louisville $	6	–	1	11	–	2
Cincinnati	5	–	2	7	–	5
UAB	5	–	2	6	–	5
East Carolina	5	–	2	6	–	6
Southern Miss	4	–	3	6	–	5
TCU	4	–	3	6	–	6
Memphis	3	–	4	5	–	6
Army	2	–	5	3	–	8
Tulane	1	–	6	3	–	9
Houston	0	–	7	0	–	11
$ – Conference champion; Rankings from AP Poll

2001 Mid-American Conference football standings
	Div			Conf.			Overall
Team	W		L	W		L	W		L
East Division
Marshall x	6	–	0	8	–	0	11	–	2
Miami (OH)	4	–	2	6	–	2	7	–	5
Bowling Green	4	–	2	5	–	3	8	–	3
Kent State	3	–	3	5	–	3	6	–	5
Akron	3	–	3	4	–	4	4	–	7
Buffalo	1	–	5	1	–	7	3	–	8
Ohio	0	–	6	1	–	7	1	–	10
West Division
No. 23 Toledo xy$	4	–	1	5	–	2	10	–	2
Northern Illinois x	4	–	1	4	–	3	6	–	5
Ball State x	4	–	1	4	–	3	5	–	6
Western Michigan	2	–	3	4	–	4	5	–	6
Central Michigan	1	–	4	2	–	6	3	–	8
Eastern Michigan	0	–	5	1	–	6	2	–	9
Championship: Toledo 41, Marshall 36
$ – Conference champion; x – Division champion/co-champions; Due to an unbalanced conference schedule, the team with best division record within each division was awarded that division's championship game berth.; Rankings from AP Poll

2001 Mountain West Conference football standings
	Conf.			Overall
Team	W		L	W		L
No. 25 BYU $	7	–	0	12	–	2
Colorado State	5	–	2	7	–	5
Utah	4	–	3	8	–	4
New Mexico	4	–	3	6	–	5
Air Force	3	–	4	6	–	6
UNLV	3	–	4	4	–	7
San Diego State	2	–	5	3	–	8
Wyoming	0	–	7	2	–	9
$ – Conference champion; Rankings from AP Poll

2001 Pacific-10 Conference football standings
	Conf.			Overall
Team	W		L	W		L
No. 2 Oregon $	7	–	1	11	–	1
No. 10 Washington State	6	–	2	10	–	2
No. 16 Stanford	6	–	2	9	–	3
No. 19 Washington	6	–	2	8	–	4
USC	5	–	3	6	–	6
UCLA	4	–	4	7	–	4
Oregon State	3	–	5	5	–	6
Arizona	2	–	6	5	–	6
Arizona State	1	–	7	4	–	7
California	0	–	8	1	–	10
$ – Conference champion; Rankings from AP Poll

2001 Southeastern Conference football standings
	Conf.			Overall
Team	W		L	W		L
Eastern Division
No. 4 Tennessee x	7	–	1	11	–	2
No. 3 Florida %	6	–	2	10	–	2
No. 13 South Carolina	5	–	3	9	–	3
No. 22 Georgia	5	–	3	8	–	4
Kentucky	1	–	7	2	–	9
Vanderbilt	0	–	8	2	–	9
Western Division
No. 7 LSU xy$	5	–	3	10	–	3
Auburn x	5	–	3	7	–	5
Ole Miss	4	–	4	7	–	4
Alabama	4	–	4	7	–	5
Arkansas	4	–	4	7	–	5
Mississippi State	2	–	6	3	–	8
Championship: LSU 31, Tennessee 20
$ – BCS representative as conference champion; % – BCS at-large representative; x – Division champion/co-champions; y – Championship game participant; Rankings from AP Poll

2001 Sun Belt Conference football standings
	Conf.			Overall
Team	W		L	W		L
North Texas +	5	–	1	5	–	7
Middle Tennessee +	5	–	1	8	–	3
New Mexico State	4	–	2	5	–	7
Louisiana–Lafayette	2	–	4	3	–	8
Arkansas State	2	–	4	2	–	9
Louisiana–Monroe	2	–	4	2	–	9
Idaho	1	–	5	1	–	10
+ – Conference co-champions

2001 Western Athletic Conference football standings
	Conf.			Overall
Team	W		L	W		L
Louisiana Tech $	7	–	1	7	–	5
Fresno State	6	–	2	11	–	3
Boise State	6	–	2	8	–	4
Hawaii	5	–	3	9	–	3
Rice	5	–	3	8	–	4
SMU	4	–	4	4	–	7
Nevada	3	–	5	3	–	8
San Jose State	3	–	5	3	–	9
UTEP	1	–	7	2	–	9
Tulsa	0	–	8	1	–	10
$ – Conference champion

2001 NCAA Division I-A independents football records
	Conf.			Overall
Team	W		L	W		L
South Florida		–		8	–	3
Troy State		–		7	–	4
UCF		–		6	–	5
Notre Dame		–		5	–	6
Utah State		–		4	–	7
Connecticut		–		2	–	9
Navy		–		0	–	10
Rankings from AP Poll

== I-AA team wins over I-A teams ==
Italics denotes I-AA teams.

Date	Visiting team	Home team	Site	Result	Attendance	Ref.
September 1	Sam Houston State	UL Monroe	Malone Stadium • Monroe, Louisiana	20–9	6,742	
September 8	No. 20 (I-AA) Eastern Washington	Connecticut	Memorial Stadium • Storrs, Connecticut	35–17	15,723	
September 22	Indiana State	Eastern Michigan	Rynearson Stadium • Ypsilanti, Michigan	21–14	13,901	
September 22	Jacksonville State	Arkansas State	Indian Stadium • Jonesboro, Arkansas	31–28	12,126	
September 22	Northern Iowa	Ball State	Ball State Stadium • Muncie, Indiana	42–39		
September 22	No. 24 (I-AA) Northwestern State	TCU	Amon G. Carter Stadium • Fort Worth, Texas	27–24 ^{OT}	30,409	
November 22	Nicholls State	Arkansas State	Indian Stadium • Jonesboro, Arkansas	28–22		
November 24	Idaho	No. 1 (I-AA) Montana	Washington–Grizzly Stadium • Missoula, Montana (Little Brown Stein)	33–27 ^{OT}	18,056	
^{#}Rankings from AP Poll released prior to game.

== Bowl Championship Series rankings ==
WEEK	No. 1	No. 2	EVENT
Oct 22	Oklahoma	Nebraska	Nebraska 20, Oklahoma 10
Oct 29	Nebraska	Oklahoma	Miami 38, Temple 0
Nov 5	Nebraska	Miami	Nebraska 31, Kansas St. 21
Nov 12	Nebraska	Miami	Miami 59, Syracuse 0
Nov 19	Nebraska	Miami	Colorado 62, Nebraska 36
Nov 26	Miami	Florida	Tennessee 34, Florida 32
Dec 3	Miami	Tennessee	LSU 31, Tennessee 20
FINAL	Miami	Nebraska	

== Final BCS standings ==
1. Miami
2. Nebraska
3. Colorado
4. Oregon
5. Florida
6. Tennessee
7. Texas
8. Illinois
9. Stanford
10. Maryland
11. Oklahoma
12. Washington State
13. LSU
14. South Carolina
15. Washington

== Bowl games ==
=== BCS bowls ===
- Rose Bowl: No. 1 Miami (FL) (BCS No. 1) 37, No. 4 Nebraska (BCS No. 2) 14
- Fiesta Bowl: No. 2 Oregon (Pac-10 champ) 38, No. 3 Colorado (Big 12 champ) 16
- Sugar Bowl: No. 12 LSU (SEC champ) 47, No. 7 Illinois (Big 10 champ) 34
- Orange Bowl: No. 5 Florida (At Large) 56, No. 6 Maryland (ACC champ) 23

=== Other New Year's Day bowls ===
- Cotton Bowl Classic: No. 10 Oklahoma 10, Arkansas 3
- Florida Citrus Bowl: No. 8 Tennessee 45, No. 17 Michigan 17
- Gator Bowl: No. 24 Florida State 30, No. 15 Virginia Tech 17
- Outback Bowl: No. 14 South Carolina 31, No. 22 Ohio State 28

=== December bowl games ===
- Holiday Bowl: No. 9 Texas 47, No. 21 Washington 43
- Peach Bowl: North Carolina 16, Auburn 10
- Tangerine Bowl: Pittsburgh 34, NC State 19
- Sun Bowl: No. 13 Washington State 33, Purdue 27
- Independence Bowl: Alabama 14, Iowa State 13
- Alamo Bowl: Iowa 19, Texas Tech 16
- Insight.com Bowl: No. 18 Syracuse 26, Kansas State 3
- Liberty Bowl: No. 23 Louisville (C-USA champ) 28, No. 19 BYU (MWC champ) 10
- Humanitarian Bowl: Clemson 49, Louisiana Tech (WAC Champ) 24
- Motor City Bowl: No. 25 Toledo (MAC Champ) 23, Cincinnati 16
- Seattle Bowl: Georgia Tech 24, No. 11 Stanford 14
- Music City Bowl: Boston College 20, No. 16 Georgia 16
- Las Vegas Bowl: Utah 10, Southern California 6
- GMAC Bowl: Marshall 64, East Carolina 61 (2 OT)
- Silicon Valley Classic: Michigan State 44, No. 20 Fresno State 35
- Galleryfurniture.com bowl: Texas A&M 28, TCU 9
- New Orleans Bowl: Colorado State 45, North Texas (Sun Belt Champ) 20

== Heisman Trophy voting ==
The Heisman Trophy is given to the year's most outstanding player

Player	School	Position	1st	2nd	3rd	Total
Eric Crouch	Nebraska	QB	162	98	88	770
Rex Grossman	Florida	QB	137	105	87	708
Ken Dorsey	Miami (FL)	QB	109	122	67	638
Joey Harrington	Oregon	QB	54	68	66	364
David Carr	Fresno State	QB	34	60	58	280
Antwaan Randle El	Indiana	QB	46	39	51	267
Roy Williams	Oklahoma	S	13	36	35	146
Bryant McKinnie	Miami (FL)	OT	26	12	14	116
Dwight Freeney	Syracuse	DE	2	6	24	42
Julius Peppers	North Carolina	DE	2	10	15	41

== Other annual awards ==
- Maxwell Award (College Player of the Year) – Ken Dorsey, Miami
- Walter Camp Award (Back) – Eric Crouch, Nebraska
- Davey O'Brien Award (Quarterback) – Eric Crouch, Nebraska
- Johnny Unitas Golden Arm Award (Senior Quarterback) – David Carr, Fresno State
- Doak Walker Award (Running back) – Luke Staley, BYU
- Fred Biletnikoff Award (Wide receiver) – Josh Reed, Louisiana State
- John Mackey Award (Tight end) – Daniel Graham, Colorado
- Dave Rimington Trophy (Center) – LeCharles Bentley, Ohio State
- Bronko Nagurski Trophy (Defensive Player) – Roy Williams, Oklahoma
- Chuck Bednarik Award – Julius Peppers, North Carolina
- Dick Butkus Award (Linebacker) – Rocky Calmus, Oklahoma
- Lombardi Award (Lineman or Linebacker) – Julius Peppers, North Carolina
- Outland Trophy (Interior Lineman) – Bryant McKinnie, Miami, OT
- Jim Thorpe Award (Defensive back) – Roy Williams, Oklahoma
- Lou Groza Award (Placekicker) – Seth Marler, Tulane
- Ray Guy Award (Punter) – Travis Dorsch, Purdue
- Paul "Bear" Bryant Award – Larry Coker, Miami
- The Home Depot Coach of the Year Award: Ralph Friedgen, Maryland

== Attendances ==
#	Team	Games	Total	Average
1	Michigan	6	659,447	109,908
2	Penn State	6	645,457	107,576
3	Tennessee	6	641,059	106,843
4	Ohio State	6	621,192	103,532
5	LSU	7	633,440	90,491
6	Georgia	6	519,120	86,520
7	Auburn	6	512,691	85,449
8	Florida	6	512,590	85,432
9	Texas	5	415,310	83,062
10	Texas A&M	6	496,268	82,711
11	South Carolina	7	578,295	82,614
12	Alabama	7	576,183	82,312
13	Florida State	6	488,645	81,441
14	Notre Dame	6	484,770	80,795
15	Clemson	6	480,911	80,152
16	Wisconsin	7	545,983	77,998
17	Nebraska	8	622,436	77,805
18	Oklahoma	7	527,687	75,384
19	Michigan State	6	442,292	73,715
20	Washington	6	434,811	72,469
21	Iowa	6	387,987	64,665
22	UCLA	5	323,067	64,613
23	Kentucky	6	380,881	63,480
24	Purdue	6	368,831	61,472
25	Arkansas	7	424,934	60,705
26	BYU	6	362,699	60,450
27	Southern California	6	346,465	57,744
28	Virginia	7	393,979	56,283
29	Illinois	6	319,175	53,196
30	North Carolina	6	315,500	52,583
31	Missouri	6	315,337	52,556
32	Stanford	6	309,205	51,534
33	Virginia Tech	6	304,571	50,762
34	North Carolina State	6	295,525	49,254
35	Pittsburgh	6	293,492	48,915
36	Kansas State	6	291,245	48,541
37	West Virginia	6	289,936	48,323
38	Colorado	6	284,848	47,475
39	Miami Hurricanes	6	282,790	47,132
40	Arizona State	7	327,116	46,731
41	Texas Tech	6	276,607	46,101
42	Oregon	6	275,556	45,926
43	Mississippi	6	274,439	45,740
44	Iowa State	6	271,034	45,172
45	Arizona	6	266,299	44,383
46	Maryland	7	304,953	43,565
47	Minnesota	6	258,419	43,070
48	Fresno State	6	256,815	42,803
49	Boston College	6	255,838	42,640
50	Mississippi State	7	296,456	42,351
51	Georgia Tech	6	250,111	41,685
52	Syracuse	6	246,832	41,139
53	Oklahoma State	6	242,157	40,360
54	Louisville	6	237,342	39,557
55	Kansas	7	276,450	39,493
56	Hawaii	8	313,345	39,168
57	Air Force	6	230,631	38,439
58	East Carolina	5	186,875	37,375
59	Oregon State	5	182,060	36,412
60	Indiana	6	204,780	34,130
61	Utah	5	170,347	34,069
62	Vanderbilt	6	203,940	33,990
63	Northwestern	5	168,813	33,763
64	Toledo	5	160,058	32,012
65	Navy	5	157,479	31,496
66	Army	5	155,238	31,048
67	Baylor	7	214,206	30,601
68	New Mexico	6	182,038	30,340
69	California	6	180,736	30,123
70	TCU	4	115,887	28,972
71	UTEP	5	141,800	28,360
72	UNLV	5	140,484	28,097
73	Washington State	5	138,754	27,751
74	Colorado State	5	137,814	27,563
75	Marshall	6	159,469	26,578
76	USF	7	180,737	25,820
77	Southern Miss	5	128,246	25,649
78	Memphis	6	152,676	25,446
79	Boise State	6	142,986	23,831
80	Tulane	5	115,990	23,198
81	Wake Forest	6	138,553	23,092
82	Western Michigan	5	111,978	22,396
83	Cincinnati	6	131,014	21,836
84	Utah State	5	108,922	21,784
85	Ohio	5	104,484	20,897
86	Rutgers	7	143,184	20,455
87	Louisiana Tech	4	81,730	20,433
88	Central Florida	5	98,967	19,793
89	Tulsa	6	117,051	19,509
90	Houston	6	116,744	19,457
91	Duke	6	116,343	19,391
92	New Mexico State	4	75,381	18,845
93	UAB	5	92,500	18,500
94	Temple	6	110,637	18,440
95	Middle Tennessee	5	89,286	17,857
96	Bowling Green	5	89,062	17,812
97	San Diego State	6	106,620	17,770
98	Nevada	5	87,865	17,573
99	SMU	6	104,314	17,386
100	Central Michigan	5	85,323	17,164
101	Wyoming	6	101,732	16,955
102	Rice	5	84,617	16,923
103	Idaho	5	81,150	16,230
104	Ball State	5	80,003	16,001
105	North Texas	5	76,531	15,306
106	Miami RedHawks	5	73,486	14,697
107	Northern Illinois	6	87,622	14,604
108	Eastern Michigan	5	66,382	13,276
109	Akron	4	50,445	12,611
110	Buffalo	5	61,256	12,251
111	Arkansas State	5	53,879	10,776
112	San Jose State	4	40,829	10,207
113	Louisiana-Lafayette	5	47,278	9,456
114	Louisiana-Monroe	5	38,321	7,664
115	Kent State	5	32,976	6,595
