= 2001 Toledo Rockets football team =

American college football season

2001 Toledo Rockets football

MAC champion MAC West Division co-champion Motor City Bowl champion

MAC Championship Game, W 41–36 vs. Marshall

Motor City Bowl, W 23–16 vs. Cincinnati
- Conference: Mid-American Conference

Ranking
- Coaches: No. 22
- AP: No. 23
- Record: 10–2 (6–2 MAC)
- Head coach: Tom Amstutz (1st season)
- Offensive coordinator: Rob Spence (1st season)
- Offensive scheme: Spread
- Defensive coordinator: Lou West (1st season)
- Base defense: 4–4
- Home stadium: Glass Bowl

2001 Mid-American Conference football standings
	Div			Conf.			Overall
Team	W		L	W		L	W		L
East Division
Marshall x	6	–	0	8	–	0	11	–	2
Miami (OH)	4	–	2	6	–	2	7	–	5
Bowling Green	4	–	2	5	–	3	8	–	3
Kent State	3	–	3	5	–	3	6	–	5
Akron	3	–	3	4	–	4	4	–	7
Buffalo	1	–	5	1	–	7	3	–	8
Ohio	0	–	6	1	–	7	1	–	10
West Division
No. 23 Toledo xy$	4	–	1	5	–	2	10	–	2
Northern Illinois x	4	–	1	4	–	3	6	–	5
Ball State x	4	–	1	4	–	3	5	–	6
Western Michigan	2	–	3	4	–	4	5	–	6
Central Michigan	1	–	4	2	–	6	3	–	8
Eastern Michigan	0	–	5	1	–	6	2	–	9
Championship: Toledo 41, Marshall 36
$ – Conference champion; x – Division champion/co-champions; Due to an unbalanced conference schedule, the team with best division record within each division was awarded that division's championship game berth.; Rankings from AP Poll

The 2001 Toledo Rockets football team represented the University of Toledo during the 2001 NCAA Division I-A football season. They competed as a member of the Mid-American Conference (MAC) in the West Division. The Rockets were led by head coach Tom Amstutz. Toledo's schedule originally included a game against Youngstown State on September 15, 2001, but that contest was canceled following the September 11 attacks.

== Schedule ==
Date	Time	Opponent	Rank	Site	TV	Result	Attendance	Source
August 30	7:00 pm	Minnesota*		Glass Bowl; Toledo, Ohio (13abc.com Kickoff)	BCN	W 38–7	34,950	
September 8	4:00 pm	at Temple*		Veterans Stadium; Philadelphia		W 33–7	19,751	
September 22	1:00 pm	at Central Michigan		Kelly/Shorts Stadium; Mount Pleasant, Michigan		W 52–28	27,413	
September 29	7:00 pm	Northern Illinois	No. 25	Glass Bowl; Toledo, Ohio		W 41–20	36,502	
October 6	6:00 pm	at Ohio	No. 23	Peden Stadium; Athens, Ohio		W 48–41	21,918	
October 20	2:00 pm	at Ball State	No. 25	Ball State Stadium; Muncie, Indiana	BCN	L 20–24	21,278	
October 27	7:00 pm	Navy*		Glass Bowl; Toledo, Ohio	BCN	W 21–20	36,852	
November 6	8:00 pm	Western Michigan		Glass Bowl; Toledo, Ohio	ESPN	W 41–35	23,923	
November 17	7:00 pm	Eastern Michigan		Glass Bowl; Toledo, Ohio		W 28–7	27,831	
November 23	7:00 pm	at Bowling Green		Doyt Perry Stadium; Bowling Green, Ohio (Battle of I-75)		L 21–56	26,483	
November 30	7:30 pm	No. 20 Marshall		Glass Bowl; Toledo, Ohio (MAC Championship)	ESPN2	W 41–36	20,025	
December 29	12:00 pm	vs. Cincinnati*	No. 25	Pontiac Silverdome; Pontiac, Michigan (Motor City Bowl)	ESPN	W 23–16	44,164	
*Non-conference game; Rankings from AP Poll released prior to the game; All times are in Eastern time

== Roster ==
2001 Toledo Rockets football team roster
Players
Coaches
Offense

Pos.	#	Name	Class
WR	14	Carl Ford	Jr
TB	19	Chester Taylor	Sr

Defense

Pos.	#	Name	Class
CB	25	James Stanley	Jr

Special teams

Pos.	#	Name	Class

Head coach

- Tom Amstutz

Coordinators/assistant coaches

Legend

- (C) Team captain
- (S) Suspended
- (I) Ineligible
- Injured
- Redshirt

== After the season ==
=== NFL draft ===
The following Rocket was selected in the 2002 NFL draft following the season.

Round	Pick	Player	Position	NFL club
6	207	Chester Taylor	Running back	Baltimore Ravens
