= 2001 Sun Belt Conference football season =

- League: NCAA Division I FBS (Football Bowl Subdivision)
- Sport: football
- Duration: August 23, 2001 – December 1, 2001
- Teams: 7

2002 NFL Draft
- Top draft pick: Kendall Newson (Middle Tennessee)
- Picked by: Jacksonville Jaguars, 222nd overall

Regular season
- Season champions: Middle Tennessee & North Texas
- Runners-up: New Mexico State
- Season MVP: Wes Counts
- Top scorer: Dwone Hicks (144 points)

Football seasons
- 2002

2001 Sun Belt Conference football standings
	Conf.			Overall
Team	W		L	W		L
North Texas +	5	–	1	5	–	7
Middle Tennessee +	5	–	1	8	–	3
New Mexico State	4	–	2	5	–	7
Louisiana–Lafayette	2	–	4	3	–	8
Arkansas State	2	–	4	2	–	9
Louisiana–Monroe	2	–	4	2	–	9
Idaho	1	–	5	1	–	10
+ – Conference co-champions

The 2001 Sun Belt Conference football season was the inaugural college football season for the Sun Belt Conference. During the 2001 season, seven schools competed in Sun Belt football: Arkansas State, Idaho, Louisiana–Lafayette, Louisiana–Monroe, Middle Tennessee, New Mexico State and North Texas.

The conference title was won by Middle Tennessee and North Texas.

== Coaches ==
Note: Stats shown are before the beginning of the season

Team	Head coach	Years at school	Overall record	Record at school	Sun Belt record
Arkansas State	Joe Hollis	4	15–39–1	11–34	0–0
Idaho	Tom Cable	1	5–6	5–6	0–0
Louisiana–Lafayette	Jerry Baldwin	2	3–19	3–19	0–0
Louisiana–Monroe	Bobby Keasler	2	84–50–2	6–16	0–0
Middle Tennessee	Andy McCollum	2	9–13	9–13	0–0
New Mexico State	Tony Samuel	4	14–30	14–30	0–0
North Texas	Darrell Dickey	3	8–25	8–25	0–0

== Sun Belt vs. BCS AQ Conference matchups ==
Date	Visitor	Home	Conference	Score	Notes
August 30	Idaho	Washington State	Pac-10	L 7–36	
August 30	Middle Tennessee	Vanderbilt	SEC	W 37–28	
September 1	Arkansas State	Georgia	SEC	L 17–45	
September 1	New Mexico State	Texas	Big 12	L 7–41	
September 8	Arkansas State	Baylor	Big 12	L 3–24	
September 8	Idaho	Arizona	Pac-10	L 29–36	
September 8	Louisiana-Monroe	Florida	SEC	L 6–55	
September 8	Oregon State	New Mexico State	Pac-10	L 22–27	
September 8	Louisiana-Lafayette	Minnesota	Big Ten	L 14–44	
September 8	North Texas	Oklahoma	Big 12	L 10–37	
September 22	Idaho	Washington	Pac-10	L 3–53	
September 22	New Mexico State	Kansas State	Big 12	L 0–64	
September 22	Texas Tech	North Texas	Big 12	L 14–42	Neutral Site Game at Texas Stadium
October 20	Ole Miss	Arkansas State	SEC	L 17–35	
October 6	Louisiana-Lafayette	Arizona State	Pac-10	L 27–63	
October 20	Middle Tennessee	Ole Miss	SEC	L 17–45	
November 10	Middle Tennessee	LSU	SEC	L 14–30	

== Regular season ==
Index to colors and formatting
Sun Belt member won
Sun Belt member lost
Sun Belt teams in **bold**

Start times for non-conference games are local for the Sun Belt team; for conference games, starting times are local for the home team. The following list are the teams in their respective time zones: Arkansas State, Louisiana–Monroe, Louisiana–Lafayette, Middle Tennessee, North Texas are located in the Central Time Zone; New Mexico State is in the Mountain Time Zone and Idaho is in the Pacific Time Zone.

Rankings reflect that of the USA Today Coaches poll for that week until week eight when the BCS poll will be used.

=== Week 1 ===
Date	Visiting team	Home team	Site	Result	Attendance
August 23	**New Mexico State**	Louisville	Papa John's Cardinal Stadium • Louisville, Kentucky	**L** 24–45	38,129

- **Open Week: Arkansas State, Idaho, Louisiana-Lafayette, Louisiana-Monroe, Middle Tennessee, North Texas**

=== Week 2 ===
Date	Visiting team	Home team	Site	Result	Attendance
August 30	**Idaho**	Washington State	Martin Stadium • Pullman, Washington	**L** 7–36	31,097
August 30	**Middle Tennessee**	Vanderbilt	Vanderbilt Stadium • Nashville, Tennessee	**W** 37–28	39,885
September 1	**Arkansas State**	Georgia	Sanford Stadium • Athens, Georgia	**L** 17–45	86,520
September 1	Nicholls State	**Louisiana-Lafayette**	Cajun Field • Lafayette, Louisiana	**W** 20–0	
September 1	Sam Houston State	**Louisiana-Monroe**	Malone Stadium • Monroe, Louisiana	**L** 9–20	
September 1	**New Mexico State**	#5 Texas	Darrell K Royal–Texas Memorial Stadium • Austin, Texas	**L** 7–41	82,856
September 1	TCU	**North Texas**	Fouts Field • Denton, Texas	**L** 5–19	22,837

Players of the week:

Offensive		Defensive		Special teams	
Player	Team	Player	Team	Player	Team
Dwone Hicks	Middle Tennessee	Jykine Bradley	Middle Tennessee	Jonathan Knott	Louisiana-Lafayette

=== Week 3 ===
Date	Visiting team	Home team	Site	Result	Attendance
September 8	**Arkansas State**	Baylor	Floyd Casey Stadium • Waco, Texas	**L** 3–24	28,953
September 8	**Idaho**	Arizona	Arizona Stadium • Tucson, Arizona	**L** 29–36	44,250
September 8	**Louisiana-Lafayette**	Minnesota	H. H. H. Metrodome • Minneapolis	**W** 14–44	35,089
September 8	**Louisiana-Monroe**	#2 Florida	Ben Hill Griffin Stadium • Gainesville, Florida	**L** 6–55	85,011
September 8	Troy	**Middle Tennessee**	Johnny "Red" Floyd Stadium • Murfreesboro, Tennessee	**W** 54–17	
September 8	#22 Oregon State	**New Mexico State**	Aggie Memorial Stadium • Las Cruces, New Mexico	**L** 22–27	27,238
September 8	**North Texas**	#3 Oklahoma	Oklahoma Memorial Stadium • Norman, Oklahoma	**L** 10–37	74,930

Players of the week:

Offensive		Defensive		Special teams	
Player	Team	Player	Team	Player	Team
John Welsh	Idaho	Siddeeq Shabazz	New Mexico State	James Hickenbotham	Arkansas State

=== Week 4 ===
All games scheduled for Week 4 were postponed or canceled as a result of the September 11 attacks.

=== Week 5 ===
Date	Visiting team	Home team	Site	Result	Attendance
September 22	Jacksonville State	**Arkansas State**	Indian Stadium • Jonesboro, Arkansas	**L** 28–31	
September 22	**Idaho**	#13 Washington	Huskie Stadium • Seattle, WA	**L** 3–53	70,145
September 22	Southern Miss	**Louisiana-Lafayette**	Cajun Field • Lafayette, Louisiana	**L** 10–35	14,132
September 22	**Middle Tennessee**	**Louisiana-Monroe**	Malone Stadium • Monroe, Louisiana	**MTSU** 38–20	
September 22	**New Mexico State**	#12 Kansas State	KSU Stadium • Manhattan, Kansas	**L** 0–64	49,229
September 22	Texas Tech	**North Texas**	Texas Stadium • Irving, Texas	**L** 14–42	20,852

Players of the week:

Offensive		Defensive		Special teams	
Player	Team	Player	Team	Player	Team
Wes Counts	Middle Tennessee	Scotty Brown	Middle Tennessee	Robert Billings	Middle Tennessee

=== Week 6 ===
Date	Visiting team	Home team	Site	Result	Attendance
September 29	**Idaho**	Boise State	Martin Stadium • Pullman, Washington	**L** 13–45	20,359
September 22	**Middle Tennessee**	**Louisiana-Lafayette**	Cajun Field • Lafayette, Louisiana	**MSTU** 26–9	
September 22	**New Mexico State**	**Louisiana-Monroe**	Malone Stadium • Monroe, Louisiana	**NMSU** 31–0	
September 22	**North Texas**	South Florida	Raymond James Stadium • Tampa, Florida	**L** 10–28	25,156

- **Open Week: Arkansas State**

Players of the week:

Offensive		Defensive		Special teams	
Player	Team	Player	Team	Player	Team
Reshard Lee	Middle Tennessee	Scotty Brown (2)	Middle Tennessee	Robert Billings (2)	Middle Tennessee

=== Week 7 ===
Date	Visiting team	Home team	Site	Result	Attendance
October 6	**Arkansas State**	Ole Miss	Vaught–Hemingway Stadium • Oxford, Mississippi	**L** 17–35	
October 6	**Idaho**	**Middle Tennessee**	Johnny "Red" Floyd Stadium • Murfreesboro, Tennessee	**MTSU** 70–58	
October 6	**Louisiana-Lafayette**	Arizona State	Sun Devil Stadium • Tempe, Arizona	**L** 27–63	38,118
October 6	**North Texas**	**Louisiana-Monroe**	Malone Stadium • Monroe, Louisiana	**ULM** 19–17	
October 6	**New Mexico State**	Tulsa	Skelly Stadium • Tulsa, Oklahoma	**W** 24–7	17,211

Players of the week:

Offensive		Defensive		Special teams	
Player	Team	Player	Team	Player	Team
Wes Counts (2)	Middle Tennessee	Tony Lukins	New Mexico State	Tony Lukins	New Mexico State

=== Week 8 ===
Date	Visiting team	Home team	Site	Result	Attendance
October 13	**Arkansas State**	**Louisiana-Lafayette**	Cajun Field • Lafayette, Louisiana	**ASU** 26–20	
October 13	**Idaho**	**New Mexico State**	Aggie Memorial Stadium • Las Cruces, New Mexico	**NMSU** 46–39	
October 13	**Middle Tennessee**	**North Texas**	Fouts Field • Denton, Texas	**UNT** 24–21	

- **Open Week: Louisiana-Monroe**

Players of the week:

Offensive		Defensive		Special teams	
Player	Team	Player	Team	Player	Team
Kevin Galbreath	North Texas	Chris Jones	Arkansas State	Josh Hill	North Texas

=== Week 9 ===
Date	Visiting team	Home team	Site	Result	Attendance
October 20	**Arkansas State**	**North Texas**	Fouts Field • Denton, Texas	**UNT** 45–0	
October 20	**Louisiana-Lafayette**	**Idaho**	Martin Stadium • Pullman, Washington	**ULL** 54–37	
October 20	**Louisiana-Monroe**	UCF	Florida Citrus Bowl • Orlando, Florida	**L** 6–38	23,001
October 20	**Middle Tennessee**	Ole Miss	Vaught–Hemingway Stadium • Oxford, Mississippi	**L** 17–45	

- **Open Week: New Mexico State**

Players of the week:

Offensive		Defensive		Special teams	
Player	Team	Player	Team	Player	Team
Jon Van Cleave	Louisiana-Lafayette	Brad Kassell	North Texas	Josh Hill (2)	North Texas

=== Week 10 ===
Date	Visiting team	Home team	Site	Result	Attendance
October 27	**Idaho**	**Arkansas State**	Indian Stadium • Jonesboro, Arkansas	**ASU** 34–31	
October 27	**Louisiana-Monroe**	**Louisiana-Lafayette**	Cajun Field • Lafayette, Louisiana	**ULL** 17–12	
October 27	**New Mexico State**	**Middle Tennessee**	Johnny "Red" Floyd Stadium • Murfreesboro, Tennessee	**MTSU** 39–35	

- **Open Week: North Texas**

Players of the week:

Offensive		Defensive		Special teams	
Player	Team	Player	Team	Player	Team
Kendall Newson	Middle Tennessee	Les Echols	Arkansas State	Jason Hickenbotham	Arkansas State

=== Week 11 ===
Date	Visiting team	Home team	Site	Result	Attendance
November 3	**Louisiana-Monroe**	**Idaho**	Kibbie Dome • Moscow, Idaho	**UI** 42–38	
November 3	**Arkansas State**	**Middle Tennessee**	Johnny "Red" Floyd Stadium • Murfreesboro, Tennessee	**MTSU** 54–6	
November 3	**North Texas**	**New Mexico State**	Aggie Memorial Stadium • Las Cruces, New Mexico	**UNT** 22–20	

- **Open Week: Louisiana-Lafayette**

Players of the week:

Offensive		Defensive		Special teams	
Player	Team	Player	Team	Player	Team
John Welsh (2)	Idaho	Brad Kassell (2)	North Texas	Jason Ball (3)	North Texas

=== Week 12 ===
Date	Visiting team	Home team	Site	Result	Attendance
November 10	**Arkansas State**	**New Mexico State**	Aggie Memorial Stadium • Las Cruces, New Mexico	**NMSU** 28–17	
November 10	Troy State	**Louisiana-Monroe**	Malone Stadium • Monroe, Louisiana	**L** 44–12	
November 10	**Louisiana-Lafayette**	**North Texas**	Fouts Field • Denton, Texas	**UNT** 42–17	
November 10	**Middle Tennessee**	LSU	Tiger Stadium • Baton Rouge, Louisiana	**L** 30–14	88,249

- **Open Week: Idaho**

Players of the week:

Offensive		Defensive		Special teams	
Player	Team	Player	Team	Player	Team
Scott Hall	North Texas	Tony Lukins (2)	New Mexico State	Ty Jackson	North Texas

=== Week 13 ===
Date	Visiting team	Home team	Site	Result	Attendance
November 17	**Louisiana-Monroe**	**Arkansas State**	Indian Stadium • Jonesboro, Arkansas	**ULM** 16–7	
November 17	**North Texas**	**Idaho**	Kibbie Dome • Moscow, Idaho	**UNT** 50–27	
November 17	**New Mexico State**	**Louisiana-Lafayette**	Cajun Field • Lafayette, Louisiana	**NMSU** 49–46	
November 17	Connecticut	**Middle Tennessee**	Johnny "Red" Floyd Stadium • Murfreesboro, Tennessee	**W** 38–14	13,017

Players of the week:

Offensive		Defensive		Special teams	
Player	Team	Player	Team	Player	Team
Patrick Cobbs	North Texas	Scotty Brown (3)	Middle Tennessee	Dario Aguiniga	New Mexico State

=== Week 14 ===
Date	Visiting team	Home team	Site	Result	Attendance
November 22	Nicholls State	**Arkansas State**	Indian Stadium • Jonesboro, Arkansas	**L** 28–22	
November 24	**Idaho**	Montana	Washington–Grizzly Stadium • Missoula, Montana	**L** 33–27 2OT	18,056
November 24	**Louisiana-Lafayette**	UCF	Citrus Bowl • Orlando, Florida	**L** 31–0	12,264
November 24	**New Mexico State**	New Mexico	University Stadium • Albuquerque, New Mexico	**L** 53–0	

=== Week 15 ===
Date	Visiting team	Home team	Site	Result	Attendance
December 1	**Louisiana-Monroe**	Cincinnati	Nippert Stadium • Cincinnati	**L** 42–10	15,047
December 1	**North Texas**	Troy State	Veterans Memorial Stadium • Troy, Alabama	**L** 18–16	

- **Open Week: Arkansas State, Idaho, Louisiana-Lafayette, Middle Tennessee, New Mexico State**

Players of the week:

Offensive		Defensive		Special teams	
Player	Team	Player	Team	Player	Team
Anthony Tenner	Idaho	Cody Spencer	North Texas	No candidates	

== Bowl games ==
In 2001, the Sun Belt Conference placed one team in bowl games through their tie-ins: 5-6 North Texas, who became the first team to play in a bowl game with a losing record. Middle Tennessee was also bowl-eligible but did not receive a bowl invitation.

Note: All times are local

Bowl	Date	SBC team (Record)	Opponent (Record)	Site	TV	Result	Attendance
New Orleans Bowl	December 18	North Texas (5–6)	Colorado State (6–5)	Louisiana Superdome • New Orleans	ESPN2	L 45–20	27,004

== Players of the Year ==
2001 Sun Belt Player of the Year awards

Award	Player	School
Player of the Year	Wes Counts	Middle Tennessee
Offensive Player of the Year	Dwone Hicks	Middle Tennessee
Defensive Player of the Year	Brad Kassell	North Texas
Freshman of the Year	Ja'Mel Branch	North Texas
Newcomer of the Year	Kevin Galbreath	North Texas
Coach of the Year	Darrell Dickey	North Texas

== All-Conference Teams ==
Coaches All-Conference Selections

Position	Player	Team
First-team Offense
QB	Wes Counts	Middle Tennessee
RB	Kevin Galbreath*	North Texas
RB	Dwone Hicks	Middle Tennessee
WR	Chris Lacy	Idaho
WR	Kendall Newson	Middle Tennessee
TE	Jeff Muenchow	North Texas
OL	Garry Johnson	Arkansas State
OL	J. R. Randle	North Texas
OL	Brandon Westbrook	Middle Tennessee
OL	Tony Wragge	New Mexico State
OL	Nick Zuniga	North Texas
First-team Defense
DL	Brandon Kennedy*	North Texas
DL	Donald Malveaux	UL Monroe
DL	Joe Olivo	New Mexico State
DL	Tanaka Scott	Middle Tennessee
LB	Brad Kassell*	North Texas
LB	Scotty Brown	Middle Tennessee
LB	D'Wayne Taylor	New Mexico State
DB	Jykine Bradley	Middle Tennessee
DB	Jonas Buckles	North Texas
DB	Siddeeq Shabazz	New Mexico State
DB	Charles Tillman	UL Lafayette
First-team Special Teams
K	Jason Ball	North Texas
P	Jason Ball	North Texas
RS	James Hickenbotham	Arkansas State
All-purpose	James Hickenbotham	Arkansas State

Position	Player	Team
Second-team Offense
QB	K. C. Enzminger	New Mexico State
QB	John Welsh	Idaho
RB	Jonathan Adams	Arkansas State
RB	Kenton Keith	New Mexico State
WR	Nick Dugas	UL Lafayette
WR	George Marshall	North Texas
TE	Jerry Pegues	Arkansas State
OL	Glen Elarbee	Middle Tennessee
OL	Shalimar Jackson	New Mexico State
OL	Jonathon Raush	UL Lafayette
OL	Jake Scott	Idaho
OL	Matt Turney	North Texas
Second-team Defense
DL	Jon Bradley	Arkansas State
DL	Brandon Kania	Idaho
DL	Alex Pahulu	North Texas
DL	Ron Paris	North Texas
LB	Ross Brupbacher	UL Lafayette
LB	Maurice Sonnier	UL Monroe
LB	Cody Spencer	North Texas
DB	Dedrick Buckels	UL Monroe
DB	Kyries Hebert	UL Lafayette
DB	Craig Jones	North Texas
DB	Michael Woods	Middle Tennessee
Second-team Special Teams
K	Dario Aguiniga	New Mexico State
P	Robert Billings	Middle Tennessee
RS	Tony Lukins	New Mexico State
All-purpose	ReShard Lee	Middle Tennessee
