= 2001 North Texas Mean Green football team =

American college football season

2001 North Texas Mean Green football

Sun Belt co-champion

New Orleans Bowl, L 20–45 vs. Colorado State
- Conference: Sun Belt Conference
- Record: 5–7 (5–1 Sun Belt)
- Head coach: Darrell Dickey (4th season)
- Offensive scheme: Pro spread
- Defensive coordinator: Gary DeLoach (2nd season)
- Base defense: 4–3
- Home stadium: Fouts Field

2001 Sun Belt Conference football standings
	Conf.			Overall
Team	W		L	W		L
North Texas +	5	–	1	5	–	7
Middle Tennessee +	5	–	1	8	–	3
New Mexico State	4	–	2	5	–	7
Louisiana–Lafayette	2	–	4	3	–	8
Arkansas State	2	–	4	2	–	9
Louisiana–Monroe	2	–	4	2	–	9
Idaho	1	–	5	1	–	10
+ – Conference co-champions

The 2001 North Texas Mean Green football team represented the University of North Texas as a member of the newly-formed Sun Belt Conference during the 2001 NCAA Division I-A football season. Led by fourth-year head coach Darrell Dickey, the Mean Green compiled an overall record of 5–7 with a mark 5–1 in conference play, sharing the Sun Belt title with Middle Tennessee. North Texas was invited to the New Orleans Bowl, the program's first bowl game appearance since the 1959 Sun Bowl. With a losing record of 5–6, the team usually would not have been be considered bowl-eligible, but the Mean Green were able to play in a bowl game by virtue of their conference title. Previously, the most recent bowl appearance by a team with a losing record had been William & Mary in the 1970 Tangerine Bowl. The Mean Green lost the New Orleans Bowl to Colorado State. North Texas played home games at the Fouts Field in Denton, Texas,

== Schedule ==
Date	Time	Opponent	Site	TV	Result	Attendance	Source
September 1	7:05 pm	TCU*	Fouts Field; Denton, TX		L 5–19	22,837	
September 8	6:30 pm	at No. 3 Oklahoma*	Oklahoma Memorial Stadium; Norman, OK	FSN PPV	L 10–37	74,930	
September 22	7:00 pm	vs. Texas Tech*	Texas Stadium; Irving, TX		L 14–42	20,852	
September 29	7:00 pm	at South Florida*	Raymond James Stadium; Tampa, FL		L 10–28	25,156	
October 6	6:00 pm	at Louisiana–Monroe	Malone Stadium; Monroe, LA		L 17–19	7,087	
October 13	3:05 pm	Middle Tennessee^{†}	Fouts Field; Denton, TX		W 24–21	11,621	
October 20		Arkansas State	Fouts Field; Denton, TX		W 45–0		
November 3		at New Mexico State	Aggie Memorial Stadium; Las Cruces, NM		W 22–20		
November 10		Louisiana–Lafayette	Fouts Field; Denton, TX		W 42–17		
November 17	9:00 p.m.	at Idaho	Kibbie Dome; Moscow, ID		W 50–27		
December 1		at Troy State*	Veterans Memorial Stadium; Troy, AL		L 16–18	15,307	
December 18	6:00 pm	vs. Colorado State*	Louisiana Superdome; New Orleans, LA (New Orleans Bowl)	ESPN2	L 20–45	27,004	
*Non-conference game; ^{†}Homecoming; Rankings from AP Poll released prior to the game; All times are in Central time

== Roster ==
2001 North Texas Mean Green football team roster
Players
Coaches
Offense

Pos.	#	Name	Class
RB	3	Micheal Hickmon	Jr
RB	5	Kevin Galbreath	Jr
WR	6	George Marshall	Jr
WR	7	Andy Blount	Fr
WR	8	Michael Thrash	Jr
QB	10	Jeremy Pearl	So
QB	11	Scott Hall	So
QB	12	Andrew Smith	Fr
WR	13	T. J. Culberson	Fr
QB	14	Spencer Stack	Jr
QB	16	Richard Bridges	Sr
RB	21	Roy Bishop	Fr
WR	26	Corey Watkins	Sr
FB	30	Dustin Dean	Sr
RB	34	Ja'Mel Branch	Fr
RB	38	Ben Miller	So
RB	39	Freddie Johnson	Fr
RB	43	Patrick Cobbs	Fr
OL	51	James Thaggard	Fr
OL	52	Chris Miller	Fr
OL	54	Jonathan Jusiewicz	Fr
OL	57	Andy Brewster	Fr
OL	59	Casey Carr	Fr
OL	60	Cory Hall	Fr
OL	62	Reginald Odom	Sr
OL	63	Paul Cuington	Fr
OL	64	Jason May	Fr
OL	66	K. J. Jones	Fr
OL	67	Travis Matlock	So
OL	68	Ryan Aitchison	Fr
OL	69	Troy Miller	Fr
OL	71	Mark Molamphy	Jr
OL	72	Brad Woosley	Sr
OL	74	Tim Randle	Fr
OL	76	J. R. Randle	Jr
OL	77	Nick Zuniga	So
OL	78	Matt Turney	Jr
WR	80	Kevin Howard	So
WR	81	Brent DeGroot	Sr
WR	82	Corie Massey	Sr
TE	83	Sam Parker	So
TE	84	Rusty Beck	Fr
TE	88	Bobby Gardner	So
TE	89	Jeff Muenchow	Jr

Defense

Pos.	#	Name	Class
DB	1	Jonas Buckles	Fr
DB	2	Markeith Knowlton	Fr
LB	4	Casey Taylor	So
DB	9	Dominique Mackey	Fr
DB	15	Montrell Parks	Fr
LB	17	Chris Hurd	So
DB	18	Walter Priestley	Fr
DB	20	Don McGee	Jr
DB	22	Craig Jones	So
DB	23	Ty Jackson	Jr
LB	24	Justin Claborn	So
DB	25	Keith Frazier	Jr
DB	27	Robert Conrad	Jr
LB	31	Byron Campbell	Fr
DB	32	Nathan Roberts	So
DL	40	Nick Conder	Fr
LB	41	Chris Barber	So
LB	42	Luke Coe	Fr
LB	44	Tommy Harrison	Fr
DL	45	Wayne Moore	Fr
LB	46	Cougar McBride	Fr
LB	47	Aaron Tei	Fr
LB	48	Cody Spencer	So
DB	49	Remon Williams	Fr
DL	50	Donovan Wright	Jr
DL	53	Trey Davis	So
DL	56	Ron Paris	Sr
DL	58	Darrell Daniels	Jr
DL	60	Grady Davis	Fr
DL	65	Luke Conder	So
DL	73	Alex Pahulu	Sr
DL	85	Adrian Awasom	Fr
DL	86	Lee Clay	Fr
DL	87	Eric Bridges	Jr
LB	90	Brad Kassell	Sr
DL	91	Chris Ridgeway	So
DL	92	Brandon Kennedy	So
DL	93	Gabe Hero	Sr
DL	94	Matt Bradshaw	Fr
DL	95	Evan Cardwell	Fr
DL	96	Joey Harrison	Fr
DL	97	John Ryan	Jr
DL	98	Chris McIver	Jr
DL	99	Jason McCorkle	Fr

Special teams

Pos.	#	Name	Class
K	29	Jason Ball	Sr
P	35	Brad Kadlubar	Fr

Head coach

- Darrell Dickey

Coordinators/assistant coaches

- Gary DeLoach (defensive coordinator)
- Freddie Kitchens (running backs coach)

Legend

- (C) Team captain
- (S) Suspended
- (I) Ineligible
- Injured
- Redshirt

Roster
