= 2001 New Mexico State Aggies football team =

American college football season

2001 New Mexico State Aggies football
- Conference: Sun Belt Conference
- Record: 5–7 (4–2 Sun Belt)
- Head coach: Tony Samuel (5th season)
- Offensive coordinator: Barney Cotton (5th season)
- Offensive scheme: Option
- Defensive coordinator: Steve Stanard (2nd season)
- Base defense: 4–3
- Home stadium: Aggie Memorial Stadium

2001 Sun Belt Conference football standings
	Conf.			Overall
Team	W		L	W		L
North Texas +	5	–	1	5	–	7
Middle Tennessee +	5	–	1	8	–	3
New Mexico State	4	–	2	5	–	7
Louisiana–Lafayette	2	–	4	3	–	8
Arkansas State	2	–	4	2	–	9
Louisiana–Monroe	2	–	4	2	–	9
Idaho	1	–	5	1	–	10
+ – Conference co-champions

The 2001 New Mexico State Aggies football team represented New Mexico State University in the 2001 NCAA Division I-A football season. The Aggies were coached by head coach Tony Samuel and played their home games at Aggie Memorial Stadium in Las Cruces, New Mexico. This was the first season the Aggies competed as members of the Sun Belt Conference, having previously competed in the Big West Conference from 1984 to 2000.

== Schedule ==
Date	Time	Opponent	Site	TV	Result	Attendance	Source
August 23	7:00 pm	at Louisville*	Papa John's Cardinal Stadium; Louisville, KY (John Thompson Foundation Classic)		L 24–45	38,129	
September 1	6:00 pm	at No. 5 Texas*	Darrell K Royal–Texas Memorial Stadium; Austin, TX	FSN	L 7–41	82,856	
September 8	6:00 pm	No. 22 Oregon State*	Aggie Memorial Stadium; Las Cruces, NM		L 22–27	27,238	
September 22	1:10 pm	at No. 12 Kansas State*	KSU Stadium; Manhattan, KS		L 0–64	49,229	
September 29	6:00 pm	at Louisiana–Monroe	Malone Stadium; Monroe, LA		W 31–0	6,625	
October 6	2:00 pm	at Tulsa*	Skelly Stadium; Tulsa, OK		W 24–7	17,211	
October 13		Idaho	Aggie Memorial Stadium; Las Cruces, NM		W 46–39		
October 27	2:00 pm	at Middle Tennessee	Johnny "Red" Floyd Stadium; Murfreesboro, TN		L 35–39	11,327	
November 3		North Texas	Aggie Memorial Stadium; Las Cruces, NM		L 20–22		
November 10		Arkansas State	Aggie Memorial Stadium; Las Cruces, NM		W 28–17		
November 17		at Louisiana–Lafayette	Cajun Field; Lafayette, LA		W 49–46		
November 24		at New Mexico*	University Stadium; Albuquerque, NM (Rio Grande Rivalry)		L 0–53		
*Non-conference game; Rankings from AP Poll released prior to the game; All times are in Mountain time

== Roster ==
2001 New Mexico State Aggies football team roster
Players
Coaches
Offense

Pos.	#	Name	Class
RB	4	Eric Higgins	So
QB	5	Te'Mon Wallace	Jr
RB	6	Keith Mouton	Fr
WR	7	H. B. Briscoe	Jr
WR	8	Chris Lumpkin	So
QB	10	Paul Drombowski	Fr
QB	11	Buck Pierce	Fr
QB	13	Carl Scaffidi	Fr
WR	14	Preston Williams	Fr
QB	17	K. C. Enzminger	Sr
WR	19	P. J. Winston	Jr
RB	20	Kenton Keith	Sr
RB	22	Walter Taylor	Jr
RB	23	Tony Bostic	So
WR	27	Ronshay Jenkins	So
FB	36	Kermit Okamura	Jr
FB	38	Rambo Fiaseu	Fr
FB	44	Marcus Dixon	Jr
RB	48	Keeon Johnson	Sr
C	68	B. J. Van Briesen	Jr
G	72	Adam Sinclair	Fr
G	75	Shalimar Jackson	Jr
G	77	Justin Shopbell	Fr
WR	81	Chris Duncan	So
WR	84	Manwell Talbert	Sr
TE	85	Travis Samuel	Fr
TE	87	Michael Bangs	Sr
TE	89	Alex Davis	So
TE	97	Dustin Ditmore	So

Defense

Pos.	#	Name	Class
CB	3	Robert Canidate	Jr
DB	6	Tony Lukins	Sr
DB	9	Corey Paul	Sr
DB	13	Daniel Malloy	Sr
DB	15	Nick Crawford	Sr
S	28	Siddeeq Shabazz	Jr
LB	30	Simon Ocampo	Fr
S	31	Tyrone Gifford	Jr
S	31	Shukree Shabazz	Fr
LB	34	Julmar Howard	So
LB	37	Richard Glover	Fr
LB	42	Jim Cottrell	Fr
LB	43	D'Wayne Taylor	Sr
DE	95	Lamar Hill	So

Special teams

Pos.	#	Name	Class
K	12	Dario Aguiniga	So
P	16	Brian Copple	Jr

Head coach

- Tony Samuel

Coordinators/assistant coaches

- Ross Els (Special Team Coordinator/safeties)
- Mark Mauer (Wide receivers)
- Steve Stanard (Defensive coordinator/linebacker)

Legend

- (C) Team captain
- (S) Suspended
- (I) Ineligible
- Injured
- Redshirt
