= Darrell Dickey =

American football player and coach (born 1959)

Biographical details
- Born: December 6, 1959 (age 66); Galveston, Texas, U.S.

Playing career
- 1979–1982: Kansas State
- 1983: Seattle Seahawks
- 1984: New Orleans Saints
- Position: Quarterback

Coaching career (HC unless noted)
- 1985: Texas A&M (GA)
- 1986: Memphis (TE)
- 1987: Memphis (RB)
- 1988–1989: Memphis (OC/QB)
- 1990: Mississippi State (QB/RB)
- 1991–1993: LSU (TE)
- 1994–1996: UTEP (AHC/OC/QB)
- 1997: SMU (OC/QB)
- 1998–2006: North Texas
- 2007–2008: Utah State (OC/QB)
- 2009–2010: New Mexico (OC/RB)
- 2011: Texas State (co-OC/RB)
- 2012–2014: Memphis (OC/RB)
- 2015–2016: Memphis (AHC/co-OC/RB)
- 2017: Memphis (OC/RB)
- 2018–2021: Texas A&M (OC/QB)
- 2022: Texas A&M (OC/TE)
- 2023: Georgia (OA)

Head coaching record
- Overall: 42–65
- Bowls: 1–4

Accomplishments and honors

Championships
- 4 Sun Belt (2001–2004)

Awards
- 4× Sun Belt Coach of the Year (2001–2004); Second-team All-Big Eight (1982)

Darrell Ray Dickey (born December 6, 1959) is an American football coach. He was most recently an offensive analyst for the Georgia Bulldogs during the 2023 season. Prior to joining the Georgia program, he was the offensive coordinator for the Texas A&M Aggies football team.

Before joining the Texas A&M staff he was the offensive coordinator at Memphis from the 2012 to 2017 seasons, the offensive coordinator at Texas State for the 2011 season, the University of New Mexico for the 2009 and 2010 seasons, and Utah State University for the 2007 and 2008 seasons.

He was head coach of the University of North Texas from 1998 to 2006. During the 13 years prior to his stint at North Texas, Dickey was an assistant at SMU, UTEP, LSU, Mississippi State, Memphis, and Texas A&M. Subsequent to his tenure at North Texas, he was an assistant at Utah State and New Mexico.

Dickey was a quarterback in college, playing for his father, Jim Dickey, at Kansas State University. Coached by Dickey, North Texas won the 2002 New Orleans Bowl. The win highlighted a four-year period (2001–2004) during which the Mean Green became only the 11th program in college football history to win four consecutive conference titles.

Dickey comes from a family of coaches. His father, Jim Dickey, was a successful college and Texas high school coach for over 40 years. Brother Jim Dickey Jr., has coached in Texas high schools for over 30 years.

In 2006, despite being fired by the University of North Texas, Mattress Mack, a major donor requested that school officials name the new football practice facility in honor of him. Mack did not want to have his own name branded on the practice fields, but believed the program's accomplishments under his leadership deemed Dickey worthy of the naming rights.

== Playing career ==
=== High school career ===
Graduated from Chapel Hill High School in Chapel Hill, North Carolina in 1978. Passed for 2,800 yards and 24 touchdowns in 2 years at CHHS. Voted conference player of the year in 1977 and was a 1977 Shrine Bowl Participant

=== College career ===
Dickey was the starting quarterback at Kansas State for four seasons from 1979 to 1982. In 1979, he established the school record for passing yards by a freshman with 915, a record that stood until 2005 when Allan Evridge broke the record with 1,365 yards.

Dickey concluded his collegiate career in 1982 by leading the Wildcats to the school's first bowl appearance in its 87-year history, the 1982 Independence Bowl. He left Kansas State ranked second all-time in pass completions, yards passing, touchdown passes, and total offense.

Dickey remains only player in Kansas State history to lead the school in passing yards and total offense for four consecutive seasons.

=== NFL career ===
He signed free agent contracts in 1983 and 1984 with the Seattle Seahawks and New Orleans Saints respectively.

== Coaching career ==
=== Texas A&M ===
Dickey served as the offensive graduate assistant under Jackie Sherrill at Texas A&M in 1985, where he was part of a staff that led the Aggies to their first Southwest Conference title since 1975. The defensive graduate assistant on Sherrill's 1985 coaching staff was Charlie Strong, who later served at head coach of Louisville, South Florida, and rival Texas.

To cap their Southwest Conference title, the Aggies defeated rival Texas, 42–14. Quarterbacking for Texas that day was Todd Dodge, who 21 years later would replace Dickey at North Texas.

As offensive graduate assistant, Dickey helped Aggie quarterback Kevin Murray, father of Kyler Murray, develop into the SWC Offensive Player of the Year. The Aggies defeated Auburn, which boasted Heisman Trophy winner Bo Jackson in the Cotton Bowl to finish the season 10–2.

=== Memphis ===
In 1986, Dickey was hired by Charlie Bailey at the University of Memphis to serve as tight ends coach. The Tigers won only one game, finishing the season 1–10. Dickey pupil Keith Jeffries led the Tigers in touchdowns receptions for the season.

In 1987, Dickey was moved to running backs coach. The Tigers improved to 5–5–1, with wins over SEC schools Ole Miss and Alabama, which was ranked No. 15 in the country at the time. During the game, Dickey pupil Wayne Pryor outrushed Crimson Tide Heisman Trophy candidate and future Denver Broncos star Bobby Humphrey. Pryor ran for 112 yards to Humphrey's 84, and was named AP Player of the Week for his effort.

In a nod to future Dickey pupils, Pryor excelled not only as a runner, but as a receiver. He led the Tigers in rushing and rushing touchdowns, while finishing second on the team in receptions and leading the team in touchdown receptions and overall touchdowns.

In 1988, Dickey was moved to quarterbacks coach. The Tigers improved to 6–5, with wins over SEC foes Mississippi State, Florida, and Vanderbilt.

The 1988 win against Florida at Ben Hill Griffin Stadium was notable in many ways for Dickey. First, Florida entered the game undefeated and ranked #14 in the country. Heisman Trophy candidate Emmitt Smith led the Gator squad. Florida's offensive coordinator was Lynn Amedee, who had been Texas A&M's offensive coordinator when Dickey was an offensive graduate assistant there. Gator head coach Galen Hall had been an assistant at Oklahoma, coaching alongside Dickey's dad there.

The win was notable because Dickey’s father, Jim, was Florida’s defensive coordinator at the time. In the matchup between the offensive coordinator’s son and the defensive coordinator father, Darrell and Memphis won the game.

In early 1989, Memphis' football program became embroiled in a scandal when it was revealed that a player had been paid by a booster for a summer job. The then-scandal led to the resignation of head coach Charlie Bailey. Bailey was replaced by Chuck Stobart, who was then offensive coordinator at USC. Stobart had previously been head coach at Toledo and Utah.

Although Dickey was given offensive coordinator duties in addition to quarterback coaching duties, Stobart had been offensive coordinator and quarterback coach at Southern Cal, where he had coached future NFL signal-caller, Rodney Peete. The Tigers took a step backward, going 2–9, including a loss to then I-AA Arkansas State. After the season, it was revealed that there had been discord among the coaching staff with Stobart, and he fired Dickey and five other coaches as a result.

=== Mississippi State ===
Mississippi State coach Rockey Felker hired Dickey to coach quarterbacks and running backs at Mississippi State University in 1990. Mississippi State and Memphis had played each year Dickey was an assistant there.

The Bulldogs had an up and down year, finishing 5–6, but beating LSU, 34–22, to end a five-season losing streak to the Tigers. Dickey pupil Tay Galloway ran for 111 yards and two touchdowns in the victory.

Bulldog quarterback Tony Shell was 4th in the SEC in pass completions and passing yards. Running backs Tay Galloway and Kenny Roberts each ran for over 500 yards, with Roberts finishing 5th in the SEC in yards per carry with 5.6.

On November 10, 1990, Mississippi State traveled to Memphis, where Dickey faced the coach, Chuck Stobart, who had fired him less than a year prior. The Bulldogs won, 27–23.

However, the 1990 season was Mississippi States fourth consecutive losing season, and Rockey Felker resigned after the final game, a 21–9 loss in the Egg Bowl to rival Ole Miss. Incoming coach Jackie Sherrill, who had given Dickey his collegiate coaching start in 1985, did not retain any of Felker's staff.

=== LSU ===
In 1991 Dickey became tight ends coach at Louisiana State, where he served through 1993. The 1993 LSU squad upset No. 1 Alabama in Tuscaloosa.

Dickey pupil Harold Bishop earned 2nd Team All-SEC honors following the 1993 season. Bishop was then selected in the 3rd Round if the 1994 NFL Draft.

The 1993 Tiger tight end group coached by Dickey also included freshman David LaFleur, who later became an All-American and was a 1st Round pick in the 1997 NFL Draft.

=== UTEP ===
Dickey rejoined Charlie Bailey as offensive coordinator at the University of Texas at El Paso (UTEP) in 1994 and stayed with the Miners through the 1996 season.

Running back Toraino Singleton led Dickey's offense, running for over 1,300 yards in both his junior and senior season after signing with UTEP from Coffeyville Community College. The totals were good enough for second best in the Western Athletic Conference. In Dickey's 1994 and 1995 offenses, Singleton finished third and second respectively in the Western Athletic Conference in total yards from scrimmage. He was named 2nd Team All-WAC following the 1995 season, invited to the Blue-Grey Game, and signed a free agent contract with the Tampa Bay Buccaneers in 1996.

Following the 1996 season, wide receiver Cedric Johnson was named 2nd Team All-WAC.

=== SMU ===
In 1997, Southern Methodist University (SMU) coach Mike Cavan hired Dickey to lead the Pony offense as offensive coordinator and to be the quarterbacks coach. The 1997 SMU squad posted their first winning season since the return from their NCAA-imposed "Death Penalty." The season included a 31–9 victory over former Southwest Conference foe Arkansas in Shreveport, Louisiana.

=== North Texas ===
When hired to lead the Mean Green in 1998, Darrell Dickey took over a football program which hadn't had a winning season since 1994. In his fourth season at the helm, Dickey's Mean Green won a share of their first Sun Belt Conference title and played in the first of their four consecutive New Orleans Bowl appearances. From 2001 to 2004, Dickey led UNT to four consecutive Sun Belt Conference titles.

From 2001 to 2005, Dickey's North Texas teams won 26 consecutive Sun Belt Conference games, a streak that began on October 13, 2001, with a 24–21 win over Middle Tennessee State and ended on October 4, 2005, with a 13–10 loss to Troy University.

While Dickey was coach, North Texas produced back-to-back national rushing leaders. Patrick Cobbs was the leading rusher in the nation in 2003 and Jamario Thomas was national rushing leader in 2004.

During his tenure, Darrell Dickey led the UNT to high-profile wins over Big 12 schools Texas Tech (1999) and Baylor (2003). Additionally, the Mean Green posted a 2–1 record against Boise State during his time in Denton. In 2002, he guided the Mean Green to a victory over CUSA Champion Cincinnati in the New Orleans Bowl.

After two consecutive losing seasons in 2005 and 2006, Dickey was fired. North Texas paid out the remaining years on his contract.

Current and former NFL players who played for Dickey at North Texas include:

- Phil Armour center, Indianapolis Colts (2000)
- Adrian Awasom defensive end, New York Giants (2005–2007), Minnesota Vikings (2011)
- John Baker punter, St. Louis Rams (2000–2001)
- Patrick Cobbs running back, Miami Dolphins (2006–2010)
- Brad Kassell linebacker, Tennessee Titans (2002–2005), New York Jets (2006–2007)
- Cody Spencer linebacker, Tennessee Titans (2004–2005), New York Jets (2006–2008)
- Brian Waters guard, Dallas Cowboys (1999, 2013) Kansas City Chiefs (2000–2010), New England Patriots (2011)

=== Utah State ===
Following his stint at North Texas, Dickey became the offensive coordinator and quarterbacks coach at Utah State for the 2007 and 2008 seasons.

=== New Mexico ===
Dickey was the offensive coordinator and running backs coach at New Mexico for the 2009 and 2010 seasons.

=== Texas State ===
In 2011, he joined Dennis Franchione at Texas State as co-offensive coordinator and running backs coach.

=== Return to Memphis ===
In 2012, Dickey was hired to be offensive coordinator and running backs couch at the University of Memphis. Shortly after his arrival, then head coach Justin Fuente sent him to Deltona, Florida to recruit an unheralded, lighty recruited prep quarterback named Paxton Lynch. Dickey had long ago earned a reputation for finding diamonds in the rough as a recruiter, and he reported back to Fuente that Memphis should sign Lynch. In 2016, Lynch was the 26th pick in the First Round of the NFL Draft.

In November 2015, Dickey was named interim head coach of the Memphis Tiger after head coach Justin Fuente was hired by Virginia Tech. Dickey coached the Tigers against the Auburn Tigers in the Birmingham Bowl on December 30, 2015. Auburn won the game 31–10, pulling away in the second half after ending the first half tied 10-10.

In January 2017, Dickey was elevated to offensive coordinator by Memphis head coach Mike Norvell.

=== Return to Texas A&M ===
Dickey was hired by new Texas A&M head coach Jimbo Fisher to be the Aggies' offensive coordinator and quarterbacks coach. The hiring paid immediate dividends, as the Aggies' 2018 offense finished ranked 20th in nation, up from 57th in 2017. Running back Trayveon Williams led the SEC in rushing and rushing touchdowns, while Quarterback Kellen Mond ranked fifth in the SEC with 24 touchdown passes.

== Offensive coordinator statistics ==
		Total Yds/Game	Passing Yds/Game	Rushing Yds/Game	Ref
1989	Memphis	90th	93rd	41st	
1994	UTEP	82nd	86th	38th	
1995	UTEP	63rd	60th	57th	
2007	Utah State	119th	117th	95th	
2008	Utah State	84th	78th	68th	
2009	New Mexico	103rd	63rd	110th	
2010	New Mexico	120th	106th	106th	
2012	Memphis	113th	113th	70th	
2013	Memphis	118th	108th	97th	
2014	Memphis	49th	57th	40th	
2015	Memphis	19th	18th	55th	
2016	Memphis	28th	14th	84th	
2017	Memphis	4th	7th	34th	
2018	Texas A&M	15th	44th	21st	
2019	Texas A&M	72nd	64th	68th	
2020	Texas A&M	33rd	60th	27th	
2021	Texas A&M	71st	87th	44th	
2022	Texas A&M	94th	84th	79th	

== Head coaching record ==
Year	Team	Overall	Conference	Standing	Bowl/playoffs
North Texas Mean Green (Big West Conference) (1998–2000)
1998	North Texas	3–8	3–2	T–2nd	
1999	North Texas	2–9	1–5	7th	
2000	North Texas	3–8	1–4	T–3rd	
North Texas Mean Green (Sun Belt Conference) (2001–2006)
2001	North Texas	5–7	5–1	T–1st	L New Orleans
2002	North Texas	8–5	6–0	1st	W New Orleans
2003	North Texas	9–4	7–0	1st	L New Orleans
2004	North Texas	7–5	7–0	1st	L New Orleans
2005	North Texas	2–9	2–5	7th	
2006	North Texas	3–9	2–5	7th	
North Texas:		42–64	34–22		
Memphis Tigers (American Athletic Conference) (2015)
2015	Memphis	0–1			L Birmingham
Memphis:		0–1			
Total:		42–65			
National championship Conference title Conference division title or championship game berth
