= 2001 UAB Blazers football team =

American college football season

2001 UAB Blazers football
- Conference: Conference USA
- Record: 6–5 (5–2 C-USA)
- Head coach: Watson Brown (7th season)
- Offensive coordinator: Pat Sullivan (3rd season)
- Offensive scheme: Multiple
- Defensive coordinator: Rick Christophel (1st season)
- Base defense: 4–3
- Home stadium: Legion Field

2001 Conference USA football standings
	Conf.			Overall
Team	W		L	W		L
No. 17 Louisville $	6	–	1	11	–	2
Cincinnati	5	–	2	7	–	5
UAB	5	–	2	6	–	5
East Carolina	5	–	2	6	–	6
Southern Miss	4	–	3	6	–	5
TCU	4	–	3	6	–	6
Memphis	3	–	4	5	–	6
Army	2	–	5	3	–	8
Tulane	1	–	6	3	–	9
Houston	0	–	7	0	–	11
$ – Conference champion; Rankings from AP Poll

The 2001 UAB Blazers football team represented the University of Alabama at Birmingham (UAB) as a member of the Conference USA (C-USA) during the 2001 NCAA Division I-A football season. Led by seventh-year head coach Watson Brown, the Blazers compiled an overall record of 6–5 with a mark of 4–3 in conference play, placing in a three-way tie for second in C-USA. UAB played home games at Legion Field in Birmingham, Alabama.

== Schedule ==
Date	Time	Opponent	Site	TV	Result	Attendance	Source
August 30	7:05 p.m.	Montana State*	Legion Field; Birmingham, AL	CSS	W 41–13	20,000	
September 8	5:30 p.m.	at Florida State*	Doak Campbell Stadium; Tallahassee, FL	ESPN2	L 7–29	79,388	
September 22	4:00 p.m.	Army	Legion Field; Birmingham, AL		W 55–3	25,000	
September 29	6:00 p.m.	at Southern Miss	M. M. Roberts Stadium; Hattiesburg, MS	CSS	L 0–3	29,782	
October 6	5:00 p.m.	at UCF*	Florida Citrus Bowl; Orlando, FL	CSS	L 7–24	30,820	
October 13	4:00 p.m.	Cincinnati	Legion Field; Birmingham, AL		L 17–31	14,417	
October 20	4:00 p.m.	Tulane^{†}	Legion Field; Birmingham, AL		W 34–27	16,291	
October 27	1:00 p.m.	at Memphis	Liberty Bowl Memorial Stadium; Memphis, TN (Battle for the Bones)	WABM	W 17–14	25,462	
November 10	4:00 p.m.	TCU	Legion Field; Birmingham, AL		W 38–17	16,972	
November 17	7:00 p.m.	at Houston	Robertson Stadium; Houston, TX		W 43–21	11,647	
December 1	1:30 p.m.	at Pittsburgh*	Heinz Field; Pittsburgh, PA		L 6–24	40,855	
*Non-conference game; ^{†}Homecoming; All times are in Central time

== Roster ==
2001 UAB Blazers football team roster
Players
Coaches
Offense

Pos.	#	Name	Class
WR	1	Maurice Gallery	Sr
QB	2	Jeff Aaron	Sr
WR	3	Travis Johnson	Sr
QB	4	Darrell Hackney	Fr
WR	5	Willie Quinnie	Jr
WR	6	Charles Griffin	So
WR	7	Kenny Borders	Jr
WR	9	T. J. Simmons	Jr
QB	13	Tommy Babakitis	So
QB	14	Thomas Cox	Jr
WR	22	Roddy White	Fr

Defense

Pos.	#	Name	Class
LB	10	Rod Taylor	Sr
SS	15	Andrew Kopecky	Sr
DE	46	Bryan Thomas	Sr
DT	89	Eddie Freeman	Sr

Special teams

Pos.	#	Name	Class

Head coach

- Watson Brown

Coordinators/assistant coaches

Legend

- (C) Team captain
- (S) Suspended
- (I) Ineligible
- Injured
- Redshirt

Roster
Last update: 2001-11-07
