= 2001 Arkansas State Indians football team =

American college football season

2001 Arkansas State Indians football
- Conference: Sun Belt Conference
- Record: 2–9 (2–4 Sun Belt)
- Head coach: Joe Hollis (5th season)
- Offensive coordinator: Phil Davis (1st season)
- Defensive coordinator: Leon Burtnett (3rd season)
- Home stadium: Indian Stadium

2001 Sun Belt Conference football standings
	Conf.			Overall
Team	W		L	W		L
North Texas +	5	–	1	5	–	7
Middle Tennessee +	5	–	1	8	–	3
New Mexico State	4	–	2	5	–	7
Louisiana–Lafayette	2	–	4	3	–	8
Arkansas State	2	–	4	2	–	9
Louisiana–Monroe	2	–	4	2	–	9
Idaho	1	–	5	1	–	10
+ – Conference co-champions

The 2001 Arkansas State Indians football team represented Arkansas State University as a member of the Sun Belt Conference the 2001 NCAA Division I-A football season. Led Joe Hollis in his fifth and final season as head coach, the Indians compiled an overall record of 2–9 with a mark of 2–4 in conference play, placing in a three-way tie for fourth in the Sun Belt.

== Schedule ==
Date	Time	Opponent	Site	TV	Result	Attendance	Source
September 1	1:00 p.m.	at Georgia*	Sanford Stadium; Athens, GA	PPV	L 17–45	86,520	
September 8	6:00 p.m.	at Baylor*	Floyd Casey Stadium; Waco, TX		L 3–24	28,953	
September 22	6:00 p.m.	Jacksonville State*^{†}	Indian Stadium; Jonesboro, AR		L 28–31	12,126	
October 6		Ole Miss*	Indian Stadium; Jonesboro, AR		L 17–35		
October 13		Louisiana–Lafayette	Indian Stadium; Jonesboro, AR		W 26–20		
October 20		at North Texas	Fouts Field; Denton, TX		L 0–45		
October 27	2:00 p.m.	Idaho	Indian Stadium; Jonesboro, AR		W 34–31		
November 3	2:00 p.m.	at Middle Tennessee	Johnny "Red" Floyd Stadium; Murfreesboro, TN		L 6–54	20,113	
November 10		at New Mexico State	Aggie Memorial Stadium; Las Cruces, NM		L 17–28		
November 17	2:00 p.m.	Louisiana–Monroe	Indian Stadium; Jonesboro, AR (Trail of Tears Classic)		L 7–16	8,188	
November 22		Nicholls State*	Indian Stadium; Jonesboro, AR		L 22–28		
*Non-conference game; ^{†}Homecoming; All times are in Central time
