= 2001 Tulane Green Wave football team =

American college football season

2001 Tulane Green Wave football
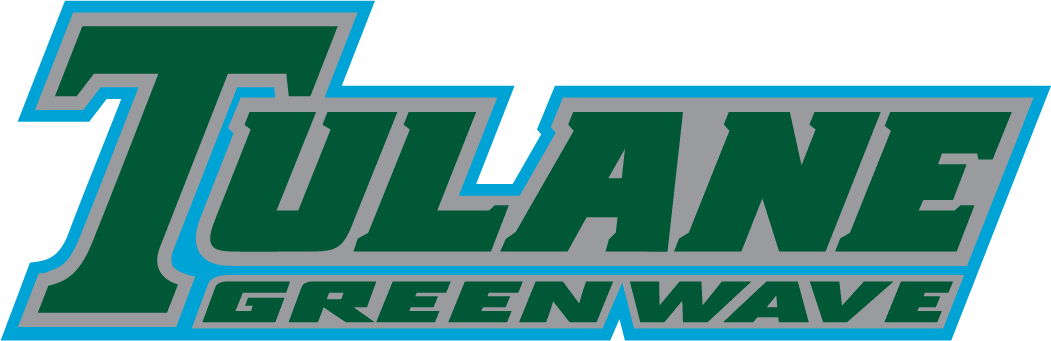
- Conference: Conference USA
- Record: 3–9 (1–6 C-USA)
- Head coach: Chris Scelfo (3rd season)
- Offensive coordinator: Frank Scelfo (1st season)
- Offensive scheme: Multiple
- Defensive coordinator: Pete McGinnis (3rd season)
- Base defense: 4–3
- Home stadium: Louisiana Superdome

2001 Conference USA football standings
	Conf.			Overall
Team	W		L	W		L
No. 17 Louisville $	6	–	1	11	–	2
Cincinnati	5	–	2	7	–	5
UAB	5	–	2	6	–	5
East Carolina	5	–	2	6	–	6
Southern Miss	4	–	3	6	–	5
TCU	4	–	3	6	–	6
Memphis	3	–	4	5	–	6
Army	2	–	5	3	–	8
Tulane	1	–	6	3	–	9
Houston	0	–	7	0	–	11
$ – Conference champion; Rankings from AP Poll

The 2001 Tulane Green Wave football team represented Tulane University in the 2001 NCAA Division I-A football season. The Green Wave played their home games at the Louisiana Superdome. They competed in Conference USA. The team was coached by head coach Chris Scelfo.

== Schedule ==
Date	Time	Opponent	Site	TV	Result	Attendance	Source
August 25	3:30 pm	at BYU*	LaVell Edwards Stadium; Provo, UT (BCA Classic)	ESPN2	L 35–70	49,008	
September 1	7:00 pm	at No. 14 LSU*	Tiger Stadium; Baton Rouge, LA (Battle for the Rag)		L 17–48	91,782	
September 8	2:30 pm	East Carolina	Louisiana Superdome; New Orleans, LA		L 24–51	19,027	
September 22	2:30 pm	UCF*	Louisiana Superdome; New Orleans, LA	SUN	L 29–36	17,497	
September 29	2:30 pm	Southern*	Louisiana Superdome; New Orleans, LA		W 41–7	41,319	
October 6	6:00 pm	at Cincinnati	Nippert Stadium; Cincinnati, OH		L 33–46	20,091	
October 13	2:30 pm	TCU^{†}	Louisiana Superdome; New Orleans, LA		W 48–22	18,778	
October 20	4:00 pm	at UAB	Legion Field; Birmingham, AL		L 27–34	16,291	
October 27	12:00 pm	at Army	Michie Stadium; West Point, NY		L 35–42	35,281	
November 3	2:30 pm	Louisville	Louisiana Superdome; New Orleans, LA		L 7–52	19,369	
November 10	11:00 am	at Navy*	Navy–Marine Corps Memorial Stadium; Annapolis, MD		W 42–28	31,456	
November 17	2:00 pm	at Southern Miss	M. M. Roberts Stadium; Hattiesburg, MS (Battle for the Bell)		L 6–59	24,054	
*Non-conference game; ^{†}Homecoming; Rankings from AP Poll released prior to the game; All times are in Central time

== Roster ==
2001 Tulane Green Wave football team roster
Players
Coaches
Offense

Pos.	#	Name	Class
QB	7	Patrick Ramsey	Sr
WR	9	Roydell Williams	So
QB	17	J. P. Losman	So
RB	26	Mewelde Moore	So
OL	60	Seth Zaunbrecher	Jr
WR	86	Zander Robonson	Sr

Defense

Pos.	#	Name	Class
DB	2	Jamal Jones	Sr
DB	3	Jeff Sanchez	Jr
LB	5	Brandon Spincer	Fr
LB	6	Darlvon Bracy	So
LB	46	Blake Baker	Fr

Special teams

Pos.	#	Name	Class
P	36	Casey Roussel	Sr
K	47	Seth Marler	Jr

Head coach

- Chris Scelfo

Coordinators/assistant coaches

Legend

- (C) Team captain
- (S) Suspended
- (I) Ineligible
- Injured
- Redshirt

Roster

== Team players in the NFL ==
Player	Position	Round	Pick	NFL club
Patrick Ramsey	Quarterback	1	32	Washington Redskins
