= 2001 Memphis Tigers football team =

American college football season

2001 Memphis Tigers football
- Conference: Conference USA
- Record: 5–6 (3–4 C-USA)
- Head coach: Tommy West (1st season)
- Offensive coordinator: Randy Fichtner (1st season)
- Offensive scheme: Pro-style
- Defensive coordinator: Rick Whitt (1st season)
- Base defense: 4–3
- Home stadium: Liberty Bowl Memorial Stadium

2001 Conference USA football standings
	Conf.			Overall
Team	W		L	W		L
No. 17 Louisville $	6	–	1	11	–	2
Cincinnati	5	–	2	7	–	5
UAB	5	–	2	6	–	5
East Carolina	5	–	2	6	–	6
Southern Miss	4	–	3	6	–	5
TCU	4	–	3	6	–	6
Memphis	3	–	4	5	–	6
Army	2	–	5	3	–	8
Tulane	1	–	6	3	–	9
Houston	0	–	7	0	–	11
$ – Conference champion; Rankings from AP Poll

The 2001 Memphis Tigers football team represented the University of Memphis in the 2001 NCAA Division I-A football season. Memphis competed as a member of the Conference USA. The team was led by head coach Tommy West. The Tigers played their home games at the Liberty Bowl Memorial Stadium.

== Schedule ==
Date	Time	Opponent	Site	TV	Result	Attendance	Source
September 3	6:00 pm	at No. 20 Mississippi State*	Scott Field; Starkville, MS	ESPN2	L 10–30	45,662	
September 8	7:00 pm	Chattanooga*	Liberty Bowl Memorial Stadium; Memphis, TN		W 43–10	24,053	
September 22	7:00 pm	South Florida	Liberty Bowl Memorial Stadium; Memphis, TN		W 17–9	26,488	
September 29	1:00 pm	at Louisville	Papa John's Cardinal Stadium; Louisville, KY (rivalry)		L 21–38	39,256	
October 6	7:00 pm	Southern Miss	Liberty Bowl Memorial Stadium; Memphis, TN (Black and Blue Bowl)		W 22–17	28,668	
October 13	7:00 pm	at Houston	Robertson Stadium; Houston, TX		W 52–33	13,513	
October 20	2:30 pm	at East Carolina	Dowdy–Ficklen Stadium; Greenville, NC	WLMT	L 11–32	38,120	
October 27	1:00 pm	UAB	Liberty Bowl Memorial Stadium; Memphis, TN (Battle for the Bones)	ESPN Plus	L 14–17	25,462	
November 10	1:00 pm	at No. 6 Tennessee*	Neyland Stadium; Knoxville, TN	PPV	L 28–49	107,221	
November 17	1:00 pm	Army	Liberty Bowl Memorial Stadium; Memphis, TN		W 42–10	23,268	
November 24	1:00 pm	Cincinnati	Liberty Bowl Memorial Stadium; Memphis, TN (rivalry)		L 34–36	26,395	
*Non-conference game; Rankings from AP Poll released prior to the game; All times are in Central time

== Roster ==
2001 Memphis Tigers football team roster
Players
Coaches
Offense

Pos.	#	Name	Class
RB	24	Dante Brown	So
WR	9	Ryan Johnson	Jr
OT	71	Wade Smith	Jr
QB	14	Neil Suber	Sr

Defense

Pos.	#	Name	Class
DT	50	Eric Taylor	So

Special teams

Pos.	#	Name	Class

Head coach

- Tommy West

Coordinators/assistant coaches

- Russ Huesman
  (Tight ends coach)

Legend

- (C) Team captain
- (S) Suspended
- (I) Ineligible
- Injured
- Redshirt
