= 2001 Middle Tennessee Blue Raiders football team =

American college football season

2001 Middle Tennessee Blue Raiders football

Sun Belt co-champion
- Conference: Sun Belt Conference
- Record: 8–3 (5–1 Sun Belt)
- Head coach: Andy McCollum (3rd season)
- Offensive coordinator: Larry Fedora (3rd season)
- Defensive coordinator: Steve Davis (1st season)
- Home stadium: Johnny "Red" Floyd Stadium

2001 Sun Belt Conference football standings
	Conf.			Overall
Team	W		L	W		L
North Texas +	5	–	1	5	–	7
Middle Tennessee +	5	–	1	8	–	3
New Mexico State	4	–	2	5	–	7
Louisiana–Lafayette	2	–	4	3	–	8
Arkansas State	2	–	4	2	–	9
Louisiana–Monroe	2	–	4	2	–	9
Idaho	1	–	5	1	–	10
+ – Conference co-champions

The 2001 Middle Tennessee Blue Raiders football team represented Middle Tennessee State University in the 2001 NCAA Division I-A football season.

== Schedule ==
Date	Time	Opponent	Site	Result	Attendance	Source
August 30	7:00 pm	at Vanderbilt*	Vanderbilt Stadium; Nashville, TN	W 37–28	39,885	
September 8	6:00 pm	Troy State*	Johnny "Red" Floyd Stadium; Murfreesboro, TN (rivalry)	W 54–17	21,723	
September 22	6:00 pm	at Louisiana–Monroe	Malone Stadium; Monroe, LA	W 38–20	12,102	
September 29	7:00 pm	at Louisiana–Lafayette	Cajun Field; Lafayette, LA	W 26–9	27,519	
October 6	6:00 pm	Idaho	Johnny "Red" Floyd Stadium; Murfreesboro, TN	W 70–58	23,106	
October 13	3:05 pm	at North Texas	Fouts Field; Denton, TX	L 21-24	11,621	
October 20	1:00 pm	at Ole Miss*	Vaught–Hemingway Stadium; Oxford, MS	L 17-45	46,886	
October 27	2:00 pm	New Mexico State	Johnny "Red" Floyd Stadium; Murfreesboro, TN	W 39–35	11,327	
November 3	2:00 pm	Arkansas State	Johnny "Red" Floyd Stadium; Murfreesboro, TN	W 54–6	20,113	
November 10	7:00 pm	at LSU*	Tiger Stadium; Baton Rouge, LA	L 16-30	88,249	
November 17	2:00 pm	Connecticut	Johnny "Red" Floyd Stadium; Murfreesboro, TN	W 38–14	13,017	
*Non-conference game; All times are in Central time

== After the season ==
=== NFL draft ===
The following Blue Raider was selected in the 2002 NFL draft following the season.

Round	Pick	Player	Position	NFL club
7	222	Kendall Newson	Wide receiver	Jacksonville Jaguars
