= Jykine Bradley =

American gridiron football player and coach (born 1980)

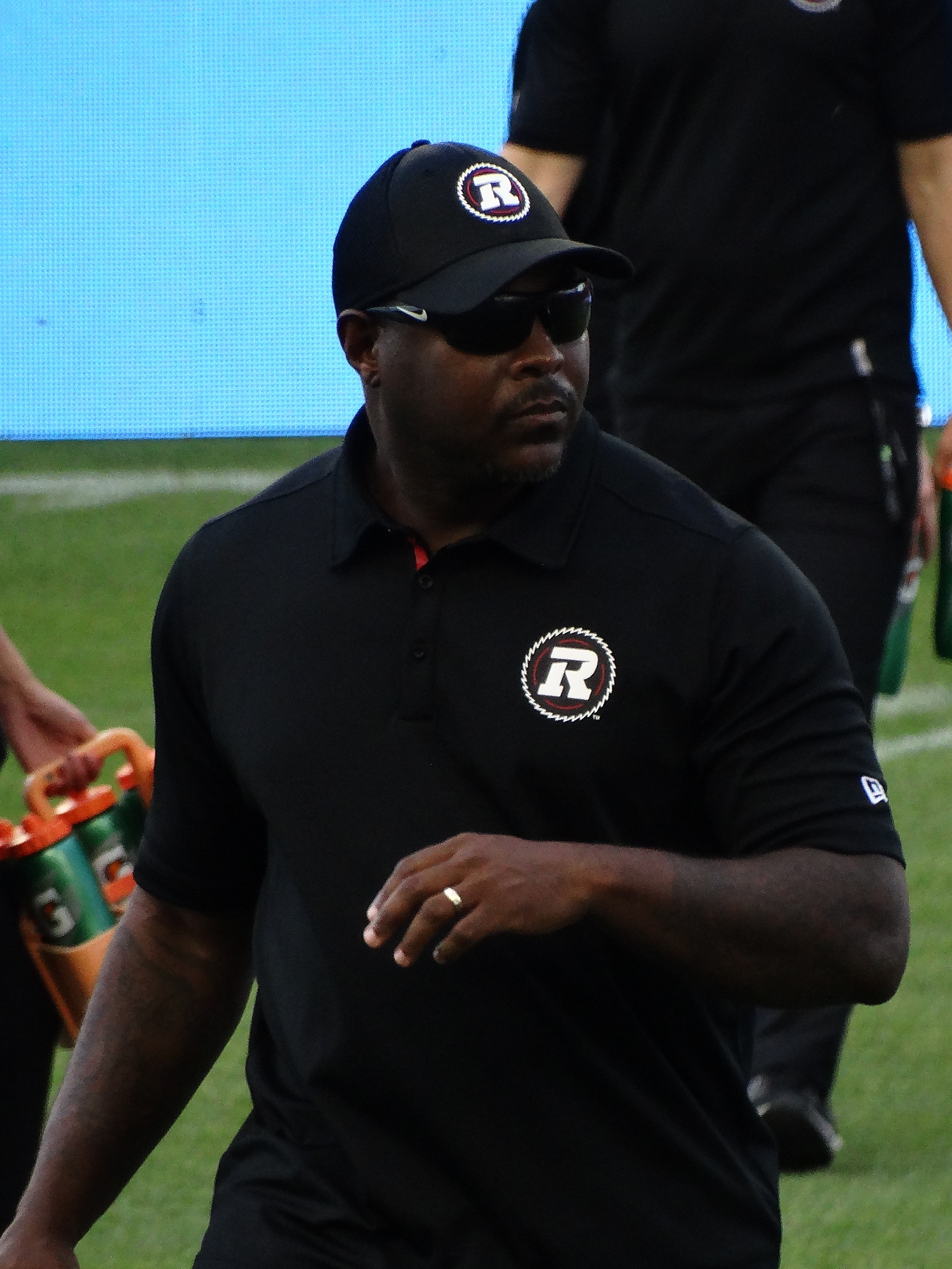
- Bradley with the Redblacks in 2023

Toronto Varsity Blues
- Title: Defensive coordinator/Defensive backs coach

Personal information
- Born: June 5, 1980 (age 46); Knoxville, Tennessee
- Listed height: 5 ft 9 in (1.75 m)
- Listed weight: 188 lb (85 kg)

Career information
- High school: Knoxville (TN) Fulton
- College: Middle Tennessee State
- NFL draft: 2003: undrafted

Career history

Playing
- Roanoke Steam (2003); Buffalo Bills (2004)*; Hamilton Tiger-Cats (2004–2010); Edmonton Eskimos (2011)
- * Offseason or practice squad member only

Coaching
- Waterloo Warriors (2017–2019) Defensive backs coach; Northwood Timberwolves (2021) Defensive backs coach; Hamilton Tiger-Cats (2022) Defensive backs coach; Ottawa Redblacks (2023) Defensive backs coach; Toronto Varsity Blues (2024–present) Defensive coordinator Defensive backs coach

Awards and highlights
- First-team All-Sun Belt (2001)
- Stats at CFL.ca (archive)

Jykine Bradley (born June 5, 1980) is a former professional gridiron football defensive back who is the defensive coordinator and defensive backs coach for the Toronto Varsity Blues of U Sports football. He played college football for the Middle Tennessee State Blue Raiders.

== Professional career ==
In his playing career Bradley was signed by the Roanoke Steam as a street free agent in 2003. Bradley also played for the Buffalo Bills, Hamilton Tiger-Cats, and Edmonton Eskimos.

== Coaching career ==
In 2022, Bradley was defensive backs coach for the Hamilton Tiger-Cats. On February 21, 2023, the Ottawa Redblacks announced they had hired Bradley as the team's defensive backs coach.

In March 2024, Bradley was named the defensive coordinator and defensive backs coach for the Toronto Varsity Blues.

== Personal life ==
Bradley lives in Brantford, Ontario and runs his own football camp called Bradley's Sports Performance (BDP). He also helps coach for the Brantford Bisons.
