= 2001 East Carolina Pirates football team =

American college football season

2001 East Carolina Pirates football

GMAC Bowl, L 61–64 ^{2OT} vs. Marshall
- Conference: Conference USA
- Record: 6–6 (5–2 C-USA)
- Head coach: Steve Logan (10th season)
- Offensive coordinator: Doug Martin (6th season)
- Offensive scheme: Spread
- Defensive coordinator: Tim Rose (3rd season)
- Base defense: 4–3
- Home stadium: Dowdy–Ficklen Stadium

2001 Conference USA football standings
	Conf.			Overall
Team	W		L	W		L
No. 17 Louisville $	6	–	1	11	–	2
Cincinnati	5	–	2	7	–	5
UAB	5	–	2	6	–	5
East Carolina	5	–	2	6	–	6
Southern Miss	4	–	3	6	–	5
TCU	4	–	3	6	–	6
Memphis	3	–	4	5	–	6
Army	2	–	5	3	–	8
Tulane	1	–	6	3	–	9
Houston	0	–	7	0	–	11
$ – Conference champion; Rankings from AP Poll

The 2001 East Carolina Pirates football team was an American football team that represented East Carolina University as a member of Conference USA during the 2001 NCAA Division I-A football season. In their tenth season under head coach Steve Logan, the team compiled a 6–6 record. The Pirates offense scored 421 points while the defense allowed 360 points.

== Schedule ==
Date	Time	Opponent	Site	TV	Result	Attendance	Source
September 1	7:00 pm	Wake Forest*	Dowdy–Ficklen Stadium; Greenville, NC		L 19–21	36,764	
September 8	3:30 pm	at Tulane	Louisiana Superdome; New Orleans, LA		W 51–24	19,027	
September 22	3:00 pm	William & Mary*	Dowdy–Ficklen Stadium; Greenville, NC		W 38–23	40,179	
September 29	1:30 pm	at Syracuse*	Carrier Dome; Syracuse, NY		L 30–44	36,347	
October 6	3:30 pm	at North Carolina*	Kenan Memorial Stadium; Chapel Hill, NC		L 21–24	58,500	
October 13	12:45 pm	at Army	Mitchie Stadium; West Point, NY	FSN	W 49–26	33,072	
October 20	3:30 pm	Memphis	Dowdy–Ficklen Stadium; Greenville, NC		W 32–11	38,120	
October 30	8:00 pm	at TCU	Amon G. Carter Stadium; Fort Worth, TX	ESPN2	W 37–30	25,134	
November 10	3:30 pm	at Cincinnati	Nippert Stadium; Cincinnati, OH	ESPN	W 28–26	19,504	
November 15	7:30 pm	No. 19 Louisville	Dowdy–Ficklen Stadium; Greenville, NC	ESPN	L 34–39	39,775	
November 23	11:00 am	Southern Miss	Dowdy–Ficklen Stadium; Greenville, NC	ESPN2	L 21–28	30,127	
December 19	8:00 pm	vs. Marshall*	Ladd–Peebles Stadium; Mobile, AL (GMAC Bowl)	ESPN2	L 61–64 ^{2OT}	40,139	
*Non-conference game; Rankings from AP Poll released prior to the game; All times are in Eastern time
