= 2001 Louisiana–Monroe Indians football team =

American college football season

2001 Louisiana–Monroe Indians football
- Conference: Sun Belt Conference
- Record: 2–9 (2–4 Sun Belt)
- Head coach: Bobby Keasler (3rd season)
- Offensive coordinator: Stan Humphries (1st season)
- Defensive coordinator: Mike Collins (3rd season)
- Home stadium: Malone Stadium

2001 Sun Belt Conference football standings
	Conf.			Overall
Team	W		L	W		L
North Texas +	5	–	1	5	–	7
Middle Tennessee +	5	–	1	8	–	3
New Mexico State	4	–	2	5	–	7
Louisiana–Lafayette	2	–	4	3	–	8
Arkansas State	2	–	4	2	–	9
Louisiana–Monroe	2	–	4	2	–	9
Idaho	1	–	5	1	–	10
+ – Conference co-champions

The 2001 Louisiana–Monroe Indians football team represented the University of Louisiana at Monroe as a member of the Sun Belt Conference during the 2001 NCAA Division I-A football season. Led by third-year head coach Bobby Keasler, the Indians compiled an overall record of 2–9 with a mark 2–4 in conference play, placing in a three-way tie for fourth in the Sun Belt. Louisiana–Monroe's offense scored 148 points while the defense allowed 351 points. The team played home games at Malone Stadium in Monroe, Louisiana.

== Schedule ==
Date	Time	Opponent	Site	TV	Result	Attendance	Source
September 1	6:00 pm	Sam Houston State*	Malone Stadium; Monroe, LA		L 9–20	6,742	
September 8	5:00 pm	at No. 2 Florida*	Ben Hill Griffin Stadium; Gainesville, FL	PPV	L 6–55	85,011	
September 22	6:00 pm	Middle Tennessee	Malone Stadium; Monroe, LA		L 20–38	9,730	
September 29	6:00 pm	New Mexico State	Malone Stadium; Monroe, LA		L 0–31	6,625	
October 6	6:00 pm	North Texas	Malone Stadium; Monroe, LA		W 19–17	7,087	
October 20	3:00 pm	at UCF*	Florida Citrus Bowl; Orlando, FL		L 6–38	23,001	
October 27	4:00 pm	at Louisiana–Lafayette	Cajun Field; Lafayette, LA (Battle on the Bayou)		L 12–17	17,353	
November 3	7:00 pm	at Idaho	Kibbie Dome; Moscow, ID		L 38–42	8,465	
November 10	6:00 pm	Troy State*	Malone Stadium; Monroe, LA		L 12–44	8,137	
November 17	2:00 pm	at Arkansas State	Indian Stadium; Jonesboro, AR (Trail of Tears Classic)		W 16–7	8,188	
December 1	12:00 pm	at Cincinnati*	Nippert Stadium; Cincinnati, OH		L 10–42	15,047	
*Non-conference game; Rankings from AP Poll released prior to the game; All times are in Central time
