= 2001 Idaho Vandals football team =

American college football season

2001 Idaho Vandals football
- Conference: Sun Belt Conference
- Record: 1–10 (1–5 SBC)
- Head coach: Tom Cable (2nd season)
- Offensive coordinator: Bret Ingalls (2nd season)
- Offensive scheme: Pro-style
- Defensive coordinator: Ed Rifilato (2nd season)
- Base defense: 4–3
- Home stadium: Martin Stadium (Pullman, WA); Kibbie Dome (Moscow, ID)

2001 Sun Belt Conference football standings
	Conf.			Overall
Team	W		L	W		L
North Texas +	5	–	1	5	–	7
Middle Tennessee +	5	–	1	8	–	3
New Mexico State	4	–	2	5	–	7
Louisiana–Lafayette	2	–	4	3	–	8
Arkansas State	2	–	4	2	–	9
Louisiana–Monroe	2	–	4	2	–	9
Idaho	1	–	5	1	–	10
+ – Conference co-champions

The 2001 Idaho Vandals football team represented the University of Idaho during the 2001 NCAA Division I-A football season. Idaho was a football-only member of the Sun Belt Conference. The Vandals' head coach was alumnus Tom Cable, in his second season, and Idaho was 1–10 overall, 1–5 in conference, their lowest win total since 1960, and most losses in a season.

Idaho played its November home games at the Kibbie Dome, an indoor 16,000-seat facility on campus in Moscow, Idaho; earlier home games in 2001 were held at Martin Stadium at Washington State University in nearby Pullman, Washington.

This was the first year of football competition in the Sun Belt Conference, which included four of the six members of the Big West from the previous football season; the three that moved to full membership were Arkansas State, New Mexico State, and North Texas. Idaho and Utah State stayed in the Big West for other sports, but the Aggies went independent for football (for two seasons). Boise State joined the Western Athletic Conference (WAC), marking the first time Idaho and BSU were not in the same conference since 1969, when the Broncos were an NAIA independent.

== Schedule ==
Date	Time	Opponent	Site	TV	Result	Attendance	Source
August 30	7:00 pm	vs. Washington State*	Martin Stadium; Pullman, WA (Battle of the Palouse)	FSN	L 7–36	31,097	
September 8	7:00 pm	at Arizona*	Arizona Stadium; Tucson, AZ		L 29–36	44,250	
September 22	12:30 pm	at No. 13 Washington*	Husky Stadium; Seattle, WA	FSN	L 3–53	70,145	
September 29	7:00 pm	Boise State	Martin Stadium; Pullman, WA (rivalry)		L 13–45	20,359	
October 6	4:00 pm	at Middle Tennessee	Floyd Stadium; Murfreesboro, TN		L 58–70	23,100	
October 13	5:00 pm	at New Mexico State	Aggie Memorial Stadium; Las Cruces, NM		L 39–46	20,323	
October 20	12:30 pm	Louisiana–Lafayette^{†}	Martin Stadium; Pullman, WA		L 37–54	13,088	
October 27	12:00 pm	at Arkansas State	Indian Stadium; Jonesboro, AR		L 31–34		
November 3	6:00 pm	Louisiana–Monroe	Kibbie Dome; Moscow, ID		W 42–38	8,465	
November 17	7:00 pm	North Texas	Kibbie Dome; Moscow, ID		L 27–50		
November 24	11:00 am	at No. 1 I-AA) Montana*	Washington–Grizzly Stadium; Missoula, MT (Little Brown Stein)		L 27–33 ^{2OT}	18,056	
*Non-conference game; ^{†}Homecoming; Rankings from AP poll; All times are in Pacific time
