= 2001 Houston Cougars football team =

American college football season

2001 Houston Cougars football
- Conference: Conference USA
- Record: 0–11 (0–7 C-USA)
- Head coach: Dana Dimel (2nd season)
- Co-offensive coordinators: Dave Warner (1st season); Clancy Barone (1st season)
- Offensive scheme: Spread
- Co-defensive coordinators: Dick Bumpas (3rd season); Bradley Dale Peveto (1st season)
- Base defense: 4–3
- Captains: Jabari Beauford; Jason Parker; Hamin Milligan; Orlando Iglesias; Clint deGroot
- Home stadium: Robertson Stadium

2001 Conference USA football standings
	Conf.			Overall
Team	W		L	W		L
No. 17 Louisville $	6	–	1	11	–	2
Cincinnati	5	–	2	7	–	5
UAB	5	–	2	6	–	5
East Carolina	5	–	2	6	–	6
Southern Miss	4	–	3	6	–	5
TCU	4	–	3	6	–	6
Memphis	3	–	4	5	–	6
Army	2	–	5	3	–	8
Tulane	1	–	6	3	–	9
Houston	0	–	7	0	–	11
$ – Conference champion; Rankings from AP Poll

The 2001 Houston Cougars football team represented the University of Houston as a member of Conference USA (C-USA) during the 2001 NCAA Division I-A football season. Led by second-year head coach Dana Dimel, the Cougars compiled an overall record of 0–11 with a mark of 0–7 in conference play, placing last out of ten teams in C-USA. The team played home games on campus, at Robertson Stadium in Houston.

== Schedule ==
Date	Time	Opponent	Site	TV	Result	Attendance	Source
September 1	7:00 pm	Rice*	Robertson Stadium; Houston, TX (rivalry)		L 14–21	23,985	
September 22	8:15 pm	No. 5 Texas*	Robertson Stadium; Houston, TX	ESPN2	L 26–53	31,784	
September 29	7:00 pm	TCU	Robertson Stadium; Houston, TX	ESPN Regional	L 17–34	19,708	
October 6	12:00 pm	at Army	Michie Stadium; West Point, NY		L 14–28	32,845	
October 13	7:00 pm	Memphis	Robertson Stadium; Houston, TX		L 33–52	13,513	
October 20	7:00 pm	Cincinnati^{†}	Robertson Stadium; Houston, TX		L 28–29	16,107	
October 27	2:00 pm	at Southern Miss	M. M. Roberts Stadium; Hattiesburg, MS		L 14–58	26,162	
November 3	6:00 pm	at South Florida*	Raymond James Stadium; Tampa, FL	Fox Sports South	L 6–45	32,711	
November 10	1:00 pm	at No. 25 Louisville	Papa John's Cardinal Stadium; Louisville, KY		L 10–34	40,479	
November 17	7:00 pm	UAB	Robertson Stadium; Houston, TX		L 21–43	11,647	
December 1	11:00 am	at No. 16 Georgia*	Sanford Stadium; Athens, GA		L 7–35	86,520	
*Non-conference game; ^{†}Homecoming; Rankings from AP Poll released prior to the game; All times are in Central time
