= 2001 Louisiana–Lafayette Ragin' Cajuns football team =

American college football season

2001 Louisiana–Lafayette Ragin' Cajuns football
- Conference: Sun Belt Conference
- Record: 3–8 (2–4 Sun Belt)
- Head coach: Jerry Baldwin (3rd season)
- Offensive coordinator: Larry Edmondson (3rd season)
- Defensive coordinator: Tony Tademy (3rd season)
- Home stadium: Cajun Field

2001 Sun Belt Conference football standings
	Conf.			Overall
Team	W		L	W		L
North Texas +	5	–	1	5	–	7
Middle Tennessee +	5	–	1	8	–	3
New Mexico State	4	–	2	5	–	7
Louisiana–Lafayette	2	–	4	3	–	8
Arkansas State	2	–	4	2	–	9
Louisiana–Monroe	2	–	4	2	–	9
Idaho	1	–	5	1	–	10
+ – Conference co-champions

The 2001 Louisiana–Lafayette Ragin' Cajuns football team represented the University of Louisiana at Lafayette as a member of the Sun Belt Conference in the 2001 NCAA Division I-A football season. They were led by third-year head coach Jerry Baldwin played their home games at Cajun Field in Lafayette, Louisiana.

== Schedule ==
Date	Opponent	Site	Result	Attendance	Source
September 1	Nicholls State*	Cajun Field; Lafayette, LA	W 20–0	13,767	
September 8	at Minnesota*	Hubert H. Humphrey Metrodome; Minneapolis, MN	L 14–44	35,089	
September 22	Southern Miss*	Cajun Field; Lafayette, LA	L 10–35	14,132	
September 29	Middle Tennessee	Cajun Field; Lafayette, LA	L 9–26	27,519	
October 6	at Arizona State*	Sun Devil Stadium; Tempe, AZ	L 27–63	38,118	
October 13	at Arkansas State	Indian Stadium; Jonesboro, AR	L 20–26		
October 20	at Idaho	Martin Stadium; Pullman, WA	W 54–37	13,088	
October 27	Louisiana–Monroe	Malone Stadium; Monroe, LA (Battle on the Bayou)	W 17–12	17,353	
November 10	at North Texas	Fouts Field; Denton, TX	L 42–17		
November 17	New Mexico State	Cajun Field; Lafayette, LA	L 46–49		
November 24	at UCF*	Florida Citrus Bowl; Orlando, FL	L 0–31	12,264	
*Non-conference game
