= 2001 Army Black Knights football team =

American college football season

2001 Army Black Knights football
- Conference: Conference USA
- Record: 3–8 (2–5 C-USA)
- Head coach: Todd Berry (2nd season)
- Offensive coordinator: John Bond (2nd season)
- Offensive scheme: Spread/option
- Defensive coordinator: Dennis Therrell (2nd season)
- Base defense: 4–4
- Captains: Clint Dodson; Brian Zickefoose
- Home stadium: Michie Stadium

2001 Conference USA football standings
	Conf.			Overall
Team	W		L	W		L
No. 17 Louisville $	6	–	1	11	–	2
Cincinnati	5	–	2	7	–	5
UAB	5	–	2	6	–	5
East Carolina	5	–	2	6	–	6
Southern Miss	4	–	3	6	–	5
TCU	4	–	3	6	–	6
Memphis	3	–	4	5	–	6
Army	2	–	5	3	–	8
Tulane	1	–	6	3	–	9
Houston	0	–	7	0	–	11
$ – Conference champion; Rankings from AP Poll

The 2001 Army Black Knights football team was an American football team that represented the United States Military Academy as a member of Conference USA (C-USA) in the 2001 NCAA Division I-A football season. In their second season under head coach Todd Berry, the Black Knights compiled a 3–8 record and were outscored by their opponents by a combined total of 365 to 229. In the annual Army–Navy Game, the Black Knights defeated Navy, 26–17. The last time they did until 2016.

== Schedule ==
Date	Time	Opponent	Site	TV	Result	Attendance	Source
September 8	1:00 p.m.	Cincinnati	Michie Stadium; West Point, NY		L 21–24	27,157	
September 22	5:00 p.m.	at UAB	Legion Field; Birmingham, AL		L 3–55	25,000	
September 29	12:00 p.m.	at Boston College*	Alumni Stadium; Chestnut Hill, MA	ESPN Plus	L 10–31	43,042	
October 6	1:00 p.m.	Houston	Michie Stadium; West Point, NY		W 28–14	32,845	
October 13	12:45 p.m.	East Carolina	Michie Stadium; West Point, NY	FSN	L 26–49	33,072	
October 20	3:00 p.m.	at TCU	Amon G. Carter Stadium; Fort Worth, TX		L 20–38	38,168	
October 27	1:00 p.m.	Tulane	Michie Stadium; West Point, NY		W 42–35	35,281	
November 3	2:00 p.m.	at Air Force*	Falcon Stadium; Colorado Springs, CO (Commander-in-Chief's Trophy, College GameDay)		L 24–34	44,910	
November 10	1:00 p.m.	Buffalo*	Michie Stadium; West Point, NY		L 19–26	26,883	
November 17	2:00 p.m.	at Memphis	Liberty Bowl Memorial Stadium; Memphis, TN		L 10–42	23,268	
December 1	12:00 p.m.	vs. Navy*	Veterans Stadium; Philadelphia, PA (Army–Navy Game)		W 26–17		
*Non-conference game; All times are in Eastern time

== Game summaries ==
=== Cincinnati ===
	1	2	3	4	Total
Bearcats	0	3	0	21	24
Black Knights	0	0	7	14	21

Statistics	CIN	ARMY
First downs	27	16
Total yards	471	363
Rushing yards	138	160
Passing yards	333	203
Turnovers	1	4
Time of possession	35:54	24:06

Team	Category	Player	Statistics
Cincinnati	Passing	Gino Guidugli	31/41, 311 yards, 3 TD
Cincinnati	Rushing	Demarco McCleskey	16 rushes, 48 yards
Cincinnati	Receiving	LaDaris Vann	12 receptions, 134 yards
Army	Passing	Chad Jenkins	19/30, 203 yards, TD, INT
Army	Rushing	Josh Holden	16 rushes, 109 yards, TD
Army	Receiving	Aris Comeaux	8 receptions, 134 yards, TD

=== At UAB ===
	1	2	3	4	Total
Black Knights	3	0	0	0	3
Blazers	14	20	14	7	55

Statistics	ARMY	UAB
First downs	13	21
Total yards	237	459
Rushing yards	46	239
Passing yards	191	220
Turnovers	6	0
Time of possession	22:57	37:03

Team	Category	Player	Statistics
Army	Passing	Chad Jenkins	15/25, 136 yards, 4 INT
Army	Rushing	Josh Holden	7 rushes, 26 yards
Army	Receiving	Brian Bruenton	3 receptions, 48 yards
UAB	Passing	Jeff Aaron	17/23, 187 yards, 2 TD
UAB	Rushing	Jegil Dugger	17 rushes, 89 yards, 2 TD
UAB	Receiving	Leron Little	5 receptions, 55 yards

=== At Boston College ===
	1	2	3	4	Total
Black Knights	0	0	7	3	10
Eagles	17	0	7	7	31

Statistics	ARMY	BC
First downs		
Total yards		
Rushing yards		
Passing yards		
Turnovers		
Time of possession		

Team	Category	Player	Statistics
Army	Passing		
Army	Rushing		
Army	Receiving		
Boston College	Passing		
Boston College	Rushing		
Boston College	Receiving		

=== Houston ===
	1	2	3	4	Total
Cougars	7	7	0	0	14
Black Knights	7	14	7	0	28

Statistics	HOU	ARMY
First downs		
Total yards		
Rushing yards		
Passing yards		
Turnovers		
Time of possession		

Team	Category	Player	Statistics
Houston	Passing		
Houston	Rushing		
Houston	Receiving		
Army	Passing		
Army	Rushing		
Army	Receiving		

=== East Carolina ===
	1	2	3	4	Total
Pirates	7	21	0	21	49
Black Knights	7	6	7	6	26

Statistics	ECU	ARMY
First downs		
Total yards		
Rushing yards		
Passing yards		
Turnovers		
Time of possession		

Team	Category	Player	Statistics
East Carolina	Passing		
East Carolina	Rushing		
East Carolina	Receiving		
Army	Passing		
Army	Rushing		
Army	Receiving		

=== At TCU ===
	1	2	3	4	Total
Black Knights	7	0	6	7	20
Horned Frogs	7	7	14	10	38

Statistics	ARMY	TCU
First downs		
Total yards		
Rushing yards		
Passing yards		
Turnovers		
Time of possession		

Team	Category	Player	Statistics
Army	Passing		
Army	Rushing		
Army	Receiving		
TCU	Passing		
TCU	Rushing		
TCU	Receiving		

=== Tulane ===
	1	2	3	4	Total
Green Wave	7	7	7	14	35
Black Knights	7	0	14	21	42

Statistics	TUL	ARMY
First downs		
Total yards		
Rushing yards		
Passing yards		
Turnovers		
Time of possession		

Team	Category	Player	Statistics
Tulane	Passing		
Tulane	Rushing		
Tulane	Receiving		
Army	Passing		
Army	Rushing		
Army	Receiving		

=== At Air Force ===
	1	2	3	4	Total
Black Knights	7	3	7	7	24
Falcons	10	7	14	3	34

Statistics	ARMY	AF
First downs		
Total yards		
Rushing yards		
Passing yards		
Turnovers		
Time of possession		

Team	Category	Player	Statistics
Army	Passing		
Army	Rushing		
Army	Receiving		
Air Force	Passing		
Air Force	Rushing		
Air Force	Receiving		

=== Buffalo ===
	1	2	3	4	Total
Bulls	9	6	3	8	26
Black Knights	0	0	13	6	19

Statistics	BUF	ARMY
First downs		
Total yards		
Rushing yards		
Passing yards		
Turnovers		
Time of possession		

Team	Category	Player	Statistics
Buffalo	Passing		
Buffalo	Rushing		
Buffalo	Receiving		
Army	Passing		
Army	Rushing		
Army	Receiving		

=== At Memphis ===
	1	2	3	4	Total
Black Knights	3	0	7	0	10
Tigers	14	7	0	21	42

Statistics	ARMY	MEM
First downs		
Total yards		
Rushing yards		
Passing yards		
Turnovers		
Time of possession		

Team	Category	Player	Statistics
Army	Passing		
Army	Rushing		
Army	Receiving		
Memphis	Passing		
Memphis	Rushing		
Memphis	Receiving		

=== Vs. Navy ===
	1	2	3	4	Total
Midshipmen	0	3	6	8	17
Black Knights	13	3	7	3	26

Statistics	NAVY	ARMY
First downs		
Total yards		
Rushing yards		
Passing yards		
Turnovers		
Time of possession		

Team	Category	Player	Statistics
Navy	Passing		
Navy	Rushing		
Navy	Receiving		
Army	Passing		
Army	Rushing		
Army	Receiving		

== Roster ==
2001 Army Black Knights football team roster
Players
Coaches
Offense

Pos.	#	Name	Class
		Ardell Daniels	Fr
QB		Chad Jenkins	Sr
QB		Curtis Zervic	Sr

Defense

Pos.	#	Name	Class
LB		Brian Zickefoose (C)	Sr

Special teams

Pos.	#	Name	Class
P	14	Dan MacElroy	Sr

Head coach

- Todd Berry

Coordinators/assistant coaches

Legend

- (C) Team captain
- (S) Suspended
- (I) Ineligible
- Injured
- Redshirt
