= 2001 TCU Horned Frogs football team =

American college football season

2001 TCU Horned Frogs football

Galleryfurniture.com Bowl, L 9–28 vs. Texas A&M
- Conference: Conference USA
- Record: 6–6 (4–3 C-USA)
- Head coach: Gary Patterson (1st season)
- Offensive coordinator: Mike Schultz (4th season)
- Offensive scheme: Spread
- Defensive coordinator: Chuck Driesbach (1st season)
- Base defense: 4–2–5
- Home stadium: Amon G. Carter Stadium

2001 Conference USA football standings
	Conf.			Overall
Team	W		L	W		L
No. 17 Louisville $	6	–	1	11	–	2
Cincinnati	5	–	2	7	–	5
UAB	5	–	2	6	–	5
East Carolina	5	–	2	6	–	6
Southern Miss	4	–	3	6	–	5
TCU	4	–	3	6	–	6
Memphis	3	–	4	5	–	6
Army	2	–	5	3	–	8
Tulane	1	–	6	3	–	9
Houston	0	–	7	0	–	11
$ – Conference champion; Rankings from AP Poll

The 2001 TCU Horned Frogs football team represented Texas Christian University as a member of Conference USA (C-USA) during the 2001 NCAA Division I-A football season. Led by first-year head coach Gary Patterson, the Horned Frogs compiled an overall record of 6–6 with a mark of 4–3 in conference play, tying for fifth place in C-USA. TCU was invited to the Galleryfurniture.com Bowl, where they lost Texas A&M. The team played home games at Amon G. Carter Stadium on campus in Fort Worth, Texas.

A game with Marshall was originally scheduled for September 15, but was canceled in the aftermath of the September 11 attacks.

== Schedule ==
Date	Time	Opponent	Site	TV	Result	Attendance	Source
August 25	12:00 p.m.	at No. 4 Nebraska*	Memorial Stadium; Lincoln, NE	ABC	L 7–21	77,473	
September 1	7:05 p.m.	at North Texas*	Fouts Field; Denton, TX		W 19–5	22,837	
September 8	6:00 p.m.	at SMU*	Gerald J. Ford Stadium; University Park, TX (rivalry)		W 38–10	24,122	
September 15		Marshall*	Amon G. Carter Stadium; Fort Worth, TX		Canceled		
September 22	6:05 p.m.	Northwestern State*	Amon G. Carter Stadium; Fort Worth, TX		L 24–27 ^{OT}	30,409	
September 29	7:00 p.m.	at Houston	Robertson Stadium; Houston, TX	ESPN Plus	W 34–17	19,708	
October 13	2:30 p.m.	at Tulane	Louisiana Superdome; New Orleans, LA		L 22–48	18,778	
October 20	2:00 p.m.	Army^{†}	Amon G. Carter Stadium; Fort Worth, TX		W 38–20	38,168	
October 30	7:00 p.m.	East Carolina	Amon G. Carter Stadium; Fort Worth, TX	ESPN2	L 30–37	25,134	
November 10	4:00 p.m.	at UAB	Legion Field; Birmingham, AL	ESPN Plus	L 17–38	16,972	
November 23	1:00 p.m.	No. 17 Louisville	Amon G. Carter Stadium; Fort Worth, TX	ESPN	W 37–22	22,176	
December 7	6:00 p.m.	at Southern Miss	M. M. Roberts Stadium; Hattiesburg, MS	ESPN2	W 14–12	23,114	
December 28	12:30 p.m.	vs. Texas A&M*	Reliant Astrodome; Houston, TX (Galleryfurniture.com Bowl, rivalry)	ESPN	L 9–28	53,480	
*Non-conference game; ^{†}Homecoming; Rankings from AP Poll released prior to the game; All times are in Central time

== Roster ==
2001 TCU Horned Frogs football team roster
Players
Coaches
Offense

Pos.	#	Name	Class
OT	55	Anthony Alabi	Fr
WR	3	LaTarence Dunbar	Jr
WR	13	Adrian Madise	Jr
QB	1	Casey Printers	Jr
TE	19	Matt Schobel	Sr

Defense

Pos.	#	Name	Class
DB	39	Jason Goss	Jr
DE	94	Robert Pollard	So
DE	21	Bo Schobel	So

Special teams

Pos.	#	Name	Class

Head coach

- Gary Patterson

Coordinators/assistant coaches

Legend

- (C) Team captain
- (S) Suspended
- (I) Ineligible
- Injured
- Redshirt

Roster
