= 2001 Troy State Trojans football team =

American college football season

2001 Troy State Trojans football
- Conference: Independent
- Record: 7–4
- Head coach: Larry Blakeney (11th season)
- Offensive coordinator: John Shannon (1st season)
- Offensive scheme: Spread
- Defensive coordinator: Wayne Bolt (5th season)
- Base defense: 4–3
- Home stadium: Veterans Memorial Stadium

2001 NCAA Division I-A independents football records
	Conf.			Overall
Team	W		L	W		L
South Florida		–		8	–	3
Troy State		–		7	–	4
UCF		–		6	–	5
Notre Dame		–		5	–	6
Utah State		–		4	–	7
Connecticut		–		2	–	9
Navy		–		0	–	10
Rankings from AP Poll

The 2001 Troy State Trojans football team represented Troy State University—now known as Troy University—as an independent during the 2001 NCAA Division I-A football season. Led by 11th-year head coach Larry Blakeney, the Trojans compiled a record of 7–4. This was Troy State's first season competing at the NCAA Division I-A level after eight seasons at the NCAA Division I-AA level. The team played home games at Veterans Memorial Stadium in Troy, Alabama.

== Schedule ==
Date	Opponent	Site	TV	Result	Attendance	Source
September 1	at No. 4 Nebraska	Memorial Stadium; Lincoln, NE	FSN	L 14–42	77,812	
September 8	at Middle Tennessee	Johnny "Red" Floyd Stadium; Murfreesboro, TN (rivalry)		L 17–54	21,723	
September 15	Appalachian State	Veterans Memorial Stadium; Troy, AL		Canceled		
September 22	Nicholls State	Veterans Memorial Stadium; Troy, AL		W 26–0	18,154	
October 6	at No. 1 Miami (FL)	Miami Orange Bowl; Miami, FL	ESPN Plus	L 7–38	36,617	
October 13	at Mississippi State	Davis Wade Stadium; Starkville, MS		W 21–9	26,000	
October 20	Cal State Northridge	Veterans Memorial Stadium; Troy, AL		W 44–31	16,852	
October 27	Southern Utah^{†}	Veterans Memorial Stadium; Troy, AL		W 20–17	17,162	
November 3	at No. 15 Maryland	Byrd Stadium; College Park, MD		L 47–14	38,415	
November 10	at Louisiana–Monroe	Malone Stadium; Monroe, LA		W 44–12	8,137	
November 17	Jacksonville State	Veterans Memorial Stadium; Troy, AL (Battle for the Ol' School Bell)		W 21–3	17,357	
December 1	North Texas	Veterans Memorial Stadium; Troy, AL		W 18–16	15,307	
^{†}Homecoming; Rankings from AP Poll released prior to the game

== Roster ==
No. Name Pos. Ht. Wt. Yr. Hometown 1 Demontray Carter TB 5-10 191 Sr. Pensacola, Fla. 2 Chris Day WR 6-0 174 So. Birmingham, Ala. 3 Heyward Skipper WR 6-0 181 Jr. Baxley, Ga. 4 Corey Sears LB 6-0 207 5/Sr. Montgomery, Ala. 6 Chris Cox DB 5-9 175 So. Melbourne, Fla. 7 Derek Bynum QB 6-1 201 Jr. Enterprise, Ala. 9 DeWhitt Betterson TB 6-0 210 R/Fr. Starke, Fla. 10 Derek Ansley DB 6-1 166 R/Fr. Tallassee, Ala. 11 Brock Nutter QB 6-1 209 5/Sr. Hoover, Ala. 12 Drew Boteler PK 5-9 156 R/Fr. Florence, Miss. 13 Adrian Moore TE 6-1 230 Jr. Oxford, Ala. 14 Travis Dunlap DB 5-8 173 So. LaGrange, Ga. 15 Ronald Harper DB 6-0 171 So. Prattville, Ala. 16 Rayshun Reed DB 5-10 179 Jr. Phenix City, Ala. 18 Hansell Bearden QB 6-2 200 R/Fr. Cairo, Ga. 19 Calvin Colquitt WR 5-11 192 So. Atlanta, Ga. 23 Pate Harrison SN 5-11 209 So. New Brockton, Ala. 24 Freeman White DB 5-9 160 So. Birmingham, Ala. 26 Neal Oates Jr. DB 5-11 191 So. Florala, Ala. 27 Deiric Jackson DB 5-9 183 Jr. Gainesville, Fla. 28 Deloise Moore DB 6-0 205 Jr. St. Martin, Miss. 31 Carl Simmons DB 5-8 186 Sr. Lineville, Ala. 32 Gordon Williams LB 6-0 216 Jr. Miami, Fla. 33 LeBarron Black TB 5-10 215 Jr. Springfield, Fla. 34 Roddric Johnson FB 5-9 225 Sr. Gulfport, Miss. 36 Michael Jackson LB 5-9 222 So. Quincy, Fla. 37 Chris Mack DB 5-11 180 Sr. Enterprise, Ala. 38 David Philyaw DB 5-8 183 Jr. Atlanta, Ga. 40 Jonathan Tomlin FB 6-3 226 Jr. Auburn, Ala. 41 Robby Farmer LB 6-1 220 So. Hayden, Ala. 42 Byron Knight DL 6-0 276 Jr. Abbeville, Ala. 44 Jordan Lesley DE 6-2 223 So. Fulton, Miss. 45 Jimmy McClain LB 6-1 221 Sr. Enterprise, Ala. 46 Naazir Yamini LB 5-11 234 Jr. Atlanta, Ga. 48 Ben Waldrop LB 6-1 225 Sr. Pensacola, Fla. 53 Greg Mills DE 6-1 274 So. Tallahassee, Fla. 55 Rodney Jordan OL 6-4 287 Jr. Goshen, Ala. 57 Trent Garmon C 6-1 313 Jr. Gadsden, Ala. 59 Lee Milliner OL 6-3 270 So. Enterprise, Ala. 60 Henry Tellis OL 6-5 297 R/Fr. Montgomery, Ala. 61 Robin Lee OL 6-2 290 Jr. Vancleave, Miss. 64 Wes Garmon OL 6-1 289 R/Fr. Gadsden, Ala. 67 Lee Walls OL 6-4 282 Jr. Valley, Ala. 69 Charlie Goodyear OL 6-1 272 5/Sr. Montgomery, Ala. 70 Donnie Bostian OL 6-6 321 So. Warner Robins, Ga. 71 Stan Curington OL 6-7 294 Jr. Ashburn, Ga. 72 Osi Umenyiora DE 6-3 267 Jr. Auburn, Ala. 73 Demetrius Summerville DE 6-0 212 Jr. Birmingham, Ala. 75 Obed Ellis OL 6-3 265 Jr. Wetumpka, Ala. 76 Branden Hall OL 6-3 325 So. Auburn, Ala. 77 Jamaal Holt DE 6-1 242 So. Quincy, Fla. 80 Chad Lucas WR 6-1 180 So. Tuskegee, Ala. 81 Thomie Venisee WR 6-2 206 Jr. Albany, Ga. 86 Cedric Phillips TE 6-2 232 So. Roanoke, Ala. 87 Daniel O’Brien WR 6-1 181 Sr. Spartanburg, S.C. 89 Brian Thorpe WR 6-2 190 So. Bon Secour, Ala. 92 Vernon Marable DE 6-2 265 5/Sr. Ashland, Ala. 93 Jose Gamboa DL 6-1 265 Jr. Crestview, Fla. 96 Davern Williams DL 6-3 283 Jr. Montgomery, Ala. 97 Carlos Stennis DL 6-1 280 5/Sr. Meridian, Miss. 98 Dewayne McQueen DL 6-3 293 Sr. Evergreen, Ala. 99 Shelton Felton DE 6-2 250 Jr. Cordele, Ga.
