= D'Wayne Taylor =

American gridiron football player (born 1979)

Profile
- Position: Linebacker

Personal information
- Born: November 6, 1979 (age 47); Oakland, California, U.S.
- Listed height: 6 ft 0 in (1.83 m)
- Listed weight: 215 lb (98 kg)

Career information
- College: New Mexico State
- CFL draft: 2003: undrafted

Career history
- 2003–2004: Saskatchewan Roughriders*
- 2005: Ottawa Renegades
- 2006–2008: Montreal Alouettes
- * Offseason or practice squad member only

Awards and highlights
- First-team All-Sun Belt (2001)
- Stats at CFL.ca

D'Wayne Taylor (born November 6, 1979) is an American former professional football linebacker. He was signed by the Saskatchewan Roughriders as an undrafted free agent in 2003. He played college football at New Mexico State.

Taylor was also a member of the Ottawa Renegades and Montreal Alouettes.
