= 2001 Louisville Cardinals football team =

American college football season

2001 Louisville Cardinals football

C-USA champion Liberty Bowl champion

Liberty Bowl, W 28–10 vs. BYU
- Conference: Conference USA

Ranking
- Coaches: No. 16
- AP: No. 17
- Record: 11–2 (6–1 C–USA)
- Head coach: John L. Smith (3rd season)
- Offensive coordinator: Scott Linehan (2nd season)
- Offensive scheme: Pro-style
- Defensive coordinator: Chris Smeland (4th season)
- Base defense: 4–3
- Home stadium: Papa John's Cardinal Stadium

2001 Conference USA football standings
	Conf.			Overall
Team	W		L	W		L
No. 17 Louisville $	6	–	1	11	–	2
Cincinnati	5	–	2	7	–	5
UAB	5	–	2	6	–	5
East Carolina	5	–	2	6	–	6
Southern Miss	4	–	3	6	–	5
TCU	4	–	3	6	–	6
Memphis	3	–	4	5	–	6
Army	2	–	5	3	–	8
Tulane	1	–	6	3	–	9
Houston	0	–	7	0	–	11
$ – Conference champion; Rankings from AP Poll

The 2001 Louisville Cardinals football team represented the University of Louisville as a member of Conference USA (C-USA) during the 2001 NCAA Division I-A football season. Led by fourth-year head coach John L. Smith, the Cardinals compiled an overall record of 11–2 with a mark of 6–1 in conference play, winning the C-USA title for the second consecutive season. Louisville was invited to the Liberty Bowl, where the Cardinals defeated BYU. The team played home game at Papa John's Cardinal Stadium in Louisville, Kentucky.

== Schedule ==
Date	Time	Opponent	Rank	Site	TV	Result	Attendance	Source
August 23	7:00 pm	New Mexico State*		Papa John's Cardinal Stadium; Louisville, KY (John Thompson Foundation Classic)		W 45–24	38,129	
September 1	12:30 pm	at Kentucky*		Commonwealth Stadium; Lexington, KY (Governor's Cup)	JPS	W 36–10	70,838	
September 8	7:00 pm	Western Carolina*		Papa John's Cardinal Stadium; Louisville, KY		W 31–7	35,214	
September 22	12:00 pm	at Illinois*	No. 25	Memorial Stadium; Champaign, IL	ESPN	L 10–34	43,232	
September 29	2:00 pm	Memphis		Papa John's Cardinal Stadium; Louisville, KY (rivalry)		W 38–21	39,256	
October 4	7:30 pm	Colorado State*		Papa John's Cardinal Stadium; Louisville, KY	ESPN	W 7–2	39,389	
October 16	8:00 pm	Southern Miss		Papa John's Cardinal Stadium; Louisville, KY	ESPN2	W 24–14	33,627	
October 27	2:00 pm	at Cincinnati		Nippert Stadium; Cincinnati, OH (The Keg of Nails)		W 28–13	31,004	
November 3	3:30 pm	at Tulane		Louisiana Superdome; New Orleans, LA		W 52–7	19,369	
November 10	2:00 pm	Houston	No. 25	Papa John's Cardinal Stadium; Louisville, KY		W 34–10	40,479	
November 15	7:30 pm	at East Carolina	No. 19	Dowdy–Ficklen Stadium; Greenville, NC	ESPN	W 39–34	39,775	
November 23	6:00 pm	at TCU	No. 17	Amon G. Carter Stadium; Fort Worth, TX	ESPN	L 22–37	22,176	
December 31	4:00 pm	vs. No. 19 BYU*	No. 23	Liberty Bowl Memorial Stadium; Memphis, TN (Liberty Bowl)	ESPN2	W 28–10	58,968	
*Non-conference game; Rankings from AP Poll released prior to the game; All times are in Eastern time

== Roster ==
2001 Louisville Cardinals football team roster
Players
Coaches
Offense

Pos.	#	Name	Class
WR	9	Deion Branch	Sr
QB	18	Jeff Brunelli	Jr
RB	23	Lionel Gates	Fr
WR	85	Tiger Jones	Fr
QB	17	Stefan LeFors	Fr
TE	89	Richard Owens	So
QB	15	Dave Ragone	Jr
WR	82	J. R. Russell	Fr
RB	32	Eric Shelton	Fr

Defense

Pos.	#	Name	Class
LB	35	Michael Brown	Jr
S	12	Curry Burns	Jr
CB	24	Anthony Floyd	Jr
DB	42	Laroni Gallishaw	Fr
CB	3	Chris Johnson	Jr
LB	54	Robert McCune	Fr
S	1	Kerry Rhodes	Fr
DE	99	Dewayne White	Jr

Special teams

Pos.	#	Name	Class
G	62	Jamason Welker	Fr
TE	89	Richard Owens	So

Head coach

- John L. Smith

Coordinators/assistant coaches

- Mike Cox (LB)

Legend

- (C) Team captain
- (S) Suspended
- (I) Ineligible
- Injured
- Redshirt

Roster
