= 2001 Cincinnati Bearcats football team =

American college football season

2001 Cincinnati Bearcats football

Motor City Bowl, L 16–23 vs. Toledo
- Conference: Conference USA
- Record: 7–5 (5–2 C-USA)
- Head coach: Rick Minter (8th season)
- Offensive coordinator: Dave Baldwin (1st season)
- Offensive scheme: Spread
- Defensive coordinator: A. J. Christoff (1st season)
- Base defense: 4–3
- Home stadium: Nippert Stadium

2001 Conference USA football standings
	Conf.			Overall
Team	W		L	W		L
No. 17 Louisville $	6	–	1	11	–	2
Cincinnati	5	–	2	7	–	5
UAB	5	–	2	6	–	5
East Carolina	5	–	2	6	–	6
Southern Miss	4	–	3	6	–	5
TCU	4	–	3	6	–	6
Memphis	3	–	4	5	–	6
Army	2	–	5	3	–	8
Tulane	1	–	6	3	–	9
Houston	0	–	7	0	–	11
$ – Conference champion; Rankings from AP Poll

The 2001 Cincinnati Bearcats football team represented the University of Cincinnati in the 2001 NCAA Division I-A football season. The team, coached by Rick Minter, played its home games in Nippert Stadium, as it has since 1924.

== Schedule ==
Date	Time	Opponent	Site	TV	Result	Attendance	Source
September 2	2:30 pm	Purdue*	Nippert Stadium; Cincinnati, OH	ESPN2	L 14–19	35,097	
September 8	1:00 pm	at Army	Michie Stadium; West Point, NY		W 24–21	27,157	
September 22	2:00 pm	at Miami (OH)*	Yager Stadium; Oxford, OH (Victory Bell)		L 14–21	25,036	
October 6	7:00 pm	Tulane	Nippert Stadium; Cincinnati, OH		W 46–33	20,091	
October 13	5:00 pm	at UAB	Legion Field; Birmingham, AL		W 31–17	14,417	
October 20	8:00 pm	at Houston	Robertson Stadium; Houston, TX		W 29–28	16,107	
October 27	2:00 pm	Louisville	Nippert Stadium; Cincinnati, OH (The Keg of Nails)	ESPN Plus	L 13–28	31,004	
November 3	1:00 pm	Connecticut*	Nippert Stadium; Cincinnati, OH		W 45–28	17,588	
November 10	3:30 pm	East Carolina	Nippert Stadium; Cincinnati, OH	ESPN	L 26–28	19,504	
November 24	2:00 pm	at Memphis	Liberty Bowl Memorial Stadium; Memphis, TN (rivalry)		W 36–34	26,395	
December 1	1:00 pm	Louisiana–Monroe*	Nippert Stadium; Cincinnati, OH		W 42–10	15,047	
December 29	12:00 pm	vs. No. 25 Toledo*	Pontiac Silverdome; Pontiac, MI (Motor City Bowl)	ESPN	L 16–23	44,164	
*Non-conference game; Rankings from AP Poll released prior to the game; All times are in Eastern time

== Roster ==
2001 Cincinnati Bearcats football team roster
Players
Coaches
Offense

Pos.	#	Name	Class
WR	3	Tye Keith	Jr
QB	8	Gino Guidugli	Fr
RB	33	Ray Jackson	Sr
WR	81	Tim Walker	Sr
TE	83	J. R. Deatherage	Sr
WR	84	Jon Olinger	Jr

Defense

Pos.	#	Name	Class
CB	4	LaVar Glover	Sr
SS	20	Aaron Butler	Sr
FS	21	Frank Lang	Jr
DE	56	Antwan Peek	Jr
DT	94	Kirk Thompson	Sr

Special teams

Pos.	#	Name	Class
K	16	Jonathan Ruffin	Jr

Head coach

- Rick Minter

Coordinators/assistant coaches

Legend

- (C) Team captain
- (S) Suspended
- (I) Ineligible
- Injured
- Redshirt

Roster

== Players in the 2002 NFL draft ==
Player	Position	Round	Pick	NFL club
Lavar Glover	CB	7	212	Pittsburgh Steelers
