= Tony Samuel =

American football player and coach (born 1955)

Biographical details
- Born: November 14, 1955 (age 70); Trinidad
- Education: University of Nebraska–Lincoln (B.S.)

Playing career
- 1974–1977: Nebraska
- Position: Defensive end

Coaching career (HC unless noted)
- 1982–1983: Western Michigan (DL)
- 1984–1985: Stanford (DL)
- 1986–1996: Nebraska (DE/OLB)
- 1997–2004: New Mexico State
- 2005: Purdue (DE)
- 2006–2013: Southeast Missouri State
- 2014: Georgia State (OLB)
- 2015: Georgia State (DL)
- 2016–2019: UNLV (DL)

Head coaching record
- Overall: 65–117
- Tournaments: 0–1 (NCAA D-I playoffs)

Accomplishments and honors

Championships
- 1 OVC (2010)

Awards
- Eddie Robinson Award (2010); OVC Coach of the Year (2010)

Marlon Anthony Samuel (born November 14, 1955) is an American college football coach and former player. He served as head football coach at New Mexico State University (NMSU) from 1997 to 2004 and Southeast Missouri State University (SEMO) from 2005 to 2013, compiling a career college football record of 65 wins and 117 losses. Samuel had a 34–57 record at New Mexico State, which puts him at third all-time for wins in program history.

== Playing career ==
Samuel played four years at the University of Nebraska–Lincoln and was a member of Tom Osborne's first recruiting class. He was a two-year starter at defensive end, played in four bowl games and earned honorable mention All-Big Eight Conference honors as a senior.

== Early coaching career ==
From 1986 to 1996, Samuel coached the outside linebackers and rush ends at Nebraska, his alma mater, for head coach Tom Osborne. He mentored six first-team All-Americans and 12 future National Football League players, including first-round draft picks Broderick Thomas (1989), Mike Croel (1991), Trev Alberts (1994) and Grant Wistrom (1998). During Samuel's 11 seasons with the Cornhuskers, they were national champions in 1994 and 1995, captured seven Big Eight or Big 12 Conference championships, averaged 10 wins per year and played in 11 bowl games.

== Head coaching tenures ==
At New Mexico State from 1997 to 2004 as his contract was not renewed, Samuel compiled a 34–57 record. Their 6–5 record in 1999 was the best since 1992 and a 7–5 record in 2002 was their best record since 1970 until the 2023 season.

== Personal life ==
A native of Trinidad, Trinidad and Tobago, West Indies, Samuel moved to Jersey City, New Jersey, at the age of 10. He earned his B.S. degree in education from Nebraska in 1981.

== Head coaching record ==
Year	Team	Overall	Conference	Standing	Bowl/playoffs	Media^{#}	Coaches^{°}
New Mexico State Aggies (Big West Conference) (1997–2000)
1997	New Mexico State	2–9	0–5	6th			
1998	New Mexico State	3–8	1–4	6th			
1999	New Mexico State	6–5	3–2	3rd			
2000	New Mexico State	3–8	1–4	4th			
New Mexico State Aggies (Sun Belt Conference) (2001–2004)
2001	New Mexico State	5–7	4–2	3rd			
2002	New Mexico State	7–5	5–1	2nd			
2003	New Mexico State	3–9	2–5	7th			
2004	New Mexico State	5–6	4–3	T–3rd			
New Mexico State:		34–57	15–11				
Southeast Missouri State Redhawks (Ohio Valley Conference) (2006–2013)
2006	Southeast Missouri State	4–7	2–6	7th			
2007	Southeast Missouri State	3–8	1–5	9th			
2008	Southeast Missouri State	4–8	2–6	7th			
2009	Southeast Missouri State	2–9	1–7	9th			
2010	Southeast Missouri State	9–3	7–1	1st	L NCAA Division I Second Round	13	13
2011	Southeast Missouri State	3–8	2–6	T–7th			
2012	Southeast Missouri State	3–8	2–6	7th			
2013	Southeast Missouri State	3–9	2–6	8th			
Southeast Missouri State:		31–60	19–43				
Total:		65–117					
National championship Conference title Conference division title or championship game berth
^{#}Rankings for Southeast Missouri State from final Sports Network poll..; ^{°}Rankings from final Coaches' Poll..
