= Jerry Baldwin (American football) =

American football coach

Biographical details
- Born: Natchez, Mississippi, U.S.

Coaching career (HC unless noted)
- 1982–1991: Louisiana Tech (assistant)
- 1992–1998: LSU (assistant)
- 1999–2001: Louisiana–Lafayette

Head coaching record
- Overall: 6–27

Jerry L. Baldwin is an American college football coach. He served as the head football coach at the University of Louisiana at Lafayette from 1999 to 2001, compiling a record of 6–27. He was an assistant coach at Louisiana Tech University from 1982 to 1991 and Louisiana State University from 1992 to 1998.

Baldwin fired from his job at Louisiana–Lafayette following the 2001 season. In 2007, he was awarded $2 million by a jury in civil suit over his firing. The verdict was later reversed in an appeal. Baldwin now resides in Ruston, Louisiana, where he is a pastor at New Living Word Ministries and the principal of New Living Word school. He also coaches their football program.

== Head coaching record ==
Year	Team	Overall	Conference	Standing	Bowl/playoffs
Louisiana–Lafayette Ragin' Cajuns (NCAA Division I-A independent) (1999–2000)
1999	Louisiana–Lafayette	2–9			
2000	Louisiana–Lafayette	1–10			
Louisiana–Lafayette:		3–19			
Louisiana–Lafayette Ragin' Cajuns (Sun Belt Conference) (2001)
2001	Louisiana–Lafayette	3–8	2–4		
Louisiana–Lafayette:		3–8	2–4		
Total:		6–27			
