= 2001 New Orleans Bowl =

Colorado State Rams	North Texas Mean Green
(6–5)	(5–6)
Mountain West	Sun Belt
45	20
Head coach: Sonny Lubick	Head coach: Darrell Dickey
	1	2	3	4	Total
Colorado State	17	7	7	14	45
North Texas	0	14	0	6	20
- Date: December 18, 2001
- Season: 2001
- Stadium: Louisiana Superdome
- Location: New Orleans, Louisiana
- MVP: Colorado State DB Justin Gallimore
- Referee: Tom DeJoseph (Big East)
- Attendance: 27,004
- Payout: US$750,000

United States TV coverage
- Network: ESPN2
- Announcers: Mark Jones, Chris Spielman, Holly Rowe
- Nielsen ratings: 1.37

The 2001 New Orleans Bowl featured the North Texas Mean Green and the Colorado State Rams. It was the inaugural playing of the bowl game. North Texas became the first team in NCAA college football history to play in a bowl after starting their season 0–5. They were the Sun Belt Conference co-champions (5–1 in conference), which gave them bowl eligibility despite having an overall losing record (5–6).

Running back Brad Svoboda got Colorado State on the board first with a 2-yard touchdown run, to give them a 7–0 lead. Kent Naughton later connected on a 46-yard field goal to increase CSU's lead to 10–0. Quarterback Bradlee Van Pelt threw an 8-yard touchdown pass to wide receiver Jose Ochoa to give CSU a 17–0 lead.

Quarterback Scott Hall threw a 5-yard touchdown pass to Dustin Dean to get North Texas on the scoreboard, 17–7. Bradlee Van Pelt rushed 6 yards for a touchdown, and a 24–7 Colorado State lead. Scott Hall threw a 42-yard touchdown pass to Ja'Mel Branch to cut the lead to 24–14. In the third quarter, Justin Gallimore recovered a blocked punt in the end zone for a touchdown and a 31–14 lead.

In the fourth quarter, Chad Dixon rushed for a 2-yard touchdown, to increase the lead to 38–14. Running back Michael Vomhof rushed 20 yards for a touchdown to increase the lead again to 45–14. Back-up quarterback Michael Bridges threw a 13-yard touchdown pass to Andy Blount, making the final score 45–20.
