= 2001 UCF Golden Knights football team =

American college football season

2001 UCF Golden Knights football
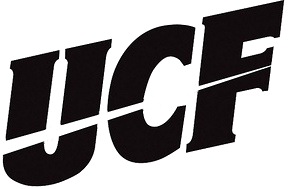
- Conference: Independent
- Record: 6–5
- Head coach: Mike Kruczek (4th season)
- Offensive coordinator: Robert McFarland (1st season)
- Defensive coordinator: Gene Chizik (4th season)
- Home stadium: Florida Citrus Bowl

2001 NCAA Division I-A independents football records
	Conf.			Overall
Team	W		L	W		L
South Florida		–		8	–	3
Troy State		–		7	–	4
UCF		–		6	–	5
Notre Dame		–		5	–	6
Utah State		–		4	–	7
Connecticut		–		2	–	9
Navy		–		0	–	10
Rankings from AP Poll

The 2001 UCF Golden Knights football team represented the University of Central Florida in the 2001 NCAA Division I-A football season. Their head coach was Mike Kruczek, who was in his fourth season with the team. The season marked the Golden Knights last season as an independent. In 2002, UCF joined the Mid-American Conference in the East Division, the first conference for the Golden Knights since ascending to the Division I Football Bowl Subdivision in 1996.

On opening day, UCF traveled to No. 19 Clemson. The Tigers outlasted UCF, and won by the score of 21–13. UCF quarterback Ryan Schneider threw for 297 yards, but an ineffective rushing game was the difference in the game. UCF scored a touchdown with 8:09 left in regulation, but a missed extra point and a punt on their next possession allowed Clemson to run out the clock and preserve the win. On October 13, UCF blew out Liberty 63–0, the largest shutout victory in school history. The Golden Knights scored on their first six possessions, jumping out to a 42–0 halftime lead. In UCF's final game as an Independent school, the Golden Knights earned a 31–0 win over Louisiana–Lafayette in their second shutout of the year, and fourth blowout win since October. Finishing with a winning record of 6–5, UCF did not receive a bowl invitation.

The game against Louisiana–Lafayette was originally scheduled for Saturday September 15, but was rescheduled to November 24 due to 9/11.

== Schedule ==
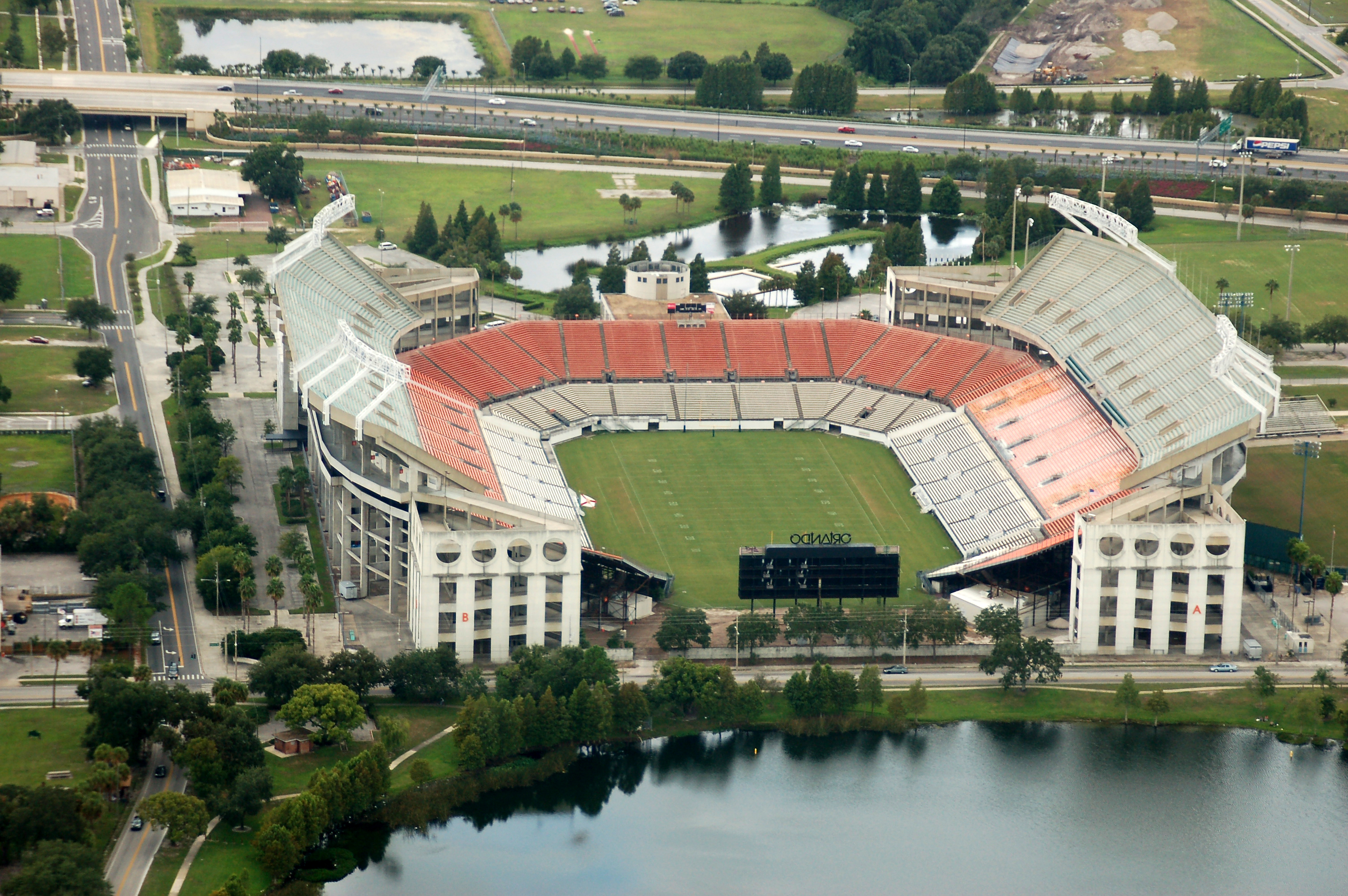
The Citrus Bowl, the Knights home field.

Date	Time	Opponent	Site	TV	Result	Attendance	Source
September 1	1:00 pm	at No. 19 Clemson	Memorial Stadium; Clemson, SC		L 13–21	81,482	
September 8	12:00 pm	at Syracuse	Carrier Dome; Syracuse, NY	SUN	L 10–21	35,938	
September 22	3:30 pm	at Tulane	Louisiana Superdome; New Orleans, LA	SUN	W 36–29	17,497	
September 29	12:00 pm	at No. 8 Virginia Tech	Lane Stadium; Blacksburg, VA	SUN	L 14–46	53,662	
October 6	6:00 pm	UAB	Florida Citrus Bowl; Orlando, FL	CSS	W 24–7	30,820	
October 13	6:00 pm	Liberty	Florida Citrus Bowl; Orlando, FL		W 63–0	17,103	
October 20	4:00 pm	Louisiana–Monroe^{†}	Florida Citrus Bowl; Orlando, FL		W 38–6	23,001	
October 27	5:05 pm	at Utah State	Romney Stadium; Logan, UT		L 27–30	16,135	
November 3	6:00 pm	Akron	Florida Citrus Bowl; Orlando, FL		W 57–17	15,779	
November 10	2:00 pm	at Arkansas	Donald W. Reynolds Razorback Stadium; Fayetteville, AR		L 20–27	61,527	
November 24	1:00 pm	Louisiana–Lafayette	Florida Citrus Bowl; Orlando, FL		W 31–0	12,264	
^{†}Homecoming; Rankings from AP Poll released prior to the game; All times are in Eastern time
