= 2001 Southern Miss Golden Eagles football team =

American college football season

2001 Southern Miss Golden Eagles football
- Conference: Conference USA
- Record: 6–5 (4–3 C-USA)
- Head coach: Jeff Bower (12th season)
- Offensive coordinator: Chris Klenakis (2nd season)
- Offensive scheme: Multiple
- Defensive coordinator: Tyrone Nix (1st season)
- Base defense: 3–4
- Home stadium: M. M. Roberts Stadium

2001 Conference USA football standings
	Conf.			Overall
Team	W		L	W		L
No. 17 Louisville $	6	–	1	11	–	2
Cincinnati	5	–	2	7	–	5
UAB	5	–	2	6	–	5
East Carolina	5	–	2	6	–	6
Southern Miss	4	–	3	6	–	5
TCU	4	–	3	6	–	6
Memphis	3	–	4	5	–	6
Army	2	–	5	3	–	8
Tulane	1	–	6	3	–	9
Houston	0	–	7	0	–	11
$ – Conference champion; Rankings from AP Poll

The 2001 Southern Miss Golden Eagles football team represented the University of Southern Mississippi in the 2001 NCAA Division I-A football season. The Golden Eagles were led by head coach Jeff Bower and played their home games at M. M. Roberts Stadium. They were a member of Conference USA.

== Schedule ==
Date	Time	Opponent	Site	TV	Result	Attendance	Source
September 1	11:00 am	Oklahoma State*	M. M. Roberts Stadium; Hattiesburg, MS	ESPN	W 17–9	25,134	
September 22	5:00 pm	at Louisiana–Lafayette*	Cajun Field; Lafayette, LA		W 35–10	14,132	
September 29	6:00 pm	UAB	M. M. Roberts Stadium; Hattiesburg, MS	CSS	W 3–0	29,782	
October 6	7:00 pm	at Memphis	Liberty Bowl Memorial Stadium; Memphis, TN (Black and Blue Bowl)		L 17–22	28,668	
October 16	7:00 pm	at Louisville	Papa John's Cardinal Stadium; Louisville, KY	ESPN2	L 14–24	33,627	
October 27	2:00 pm	Houston^{†}	M. M. Roberts Stadium; Hattiesburg, MS		W 58–14	26,162	
November 3	11:00 am	at Penn State*	Beaver Stadium; State College, PA	ESPN2	L 20–38	106,158	
November 17	2:00 pm	Tulane	M. M. Roberts Stadium; Hattiesburg, MS		W 59–6	24,054	
November 23	10:00 am	at East Carolina	Dowdy–Ficklen Stadium; Greenville, NC	ESPN	W 28–21	30,127	
November 29	6:00 pm	at Alabama*	Legion Field; Birmingham, AL	ESPN2	L 15–28	79,947	
December 7	6:00 pm	TCU	M. M. Roberts Stadium; Hattiesburg, MS	ESPN2	L 12–14	23,114	
*Non-conference game; ^{†}Homecoming; All times are in Central time

== Roster ==
2001 Southern Miss Golden Eagles football team roster
Players
Coaches
Offense

Pos.	#	Name	Class
G	73	Jeremy Bridges	Jr
QB	17	Jeff Kelly	Sr
RB	43	Derrick Nix	Jr
G	76	Torrin Tucker	Jr

Defense

Pos.	#	Name	Class
LB	27	Michael Boley	Fr
DB	5	Greg Brooks	So
LB	42	Antoine Cash	Fr
LB	24	Rod Davis	So
CB	34	Etric Pruitt	So
S	9	Chad Williams	Sr

Special teams

Pos.	#	Name	Class

Head coach

- Jeff Bower

Coordinators/assistant coaches

Legend

- (C) Team captain
- (S) Suspended
- (I) Ineligible
- Injured
- Redshirt

Roster
Last update: 2001-12-21
