= Brad Kassell =

American football player (born 1980)

No. 55
- Position: Linebacker

Personal information
- Born: January 7, 1980 (age 46); Llano, Texas, U.S.
- Listed height: 6 ft 3 in (1.91 m)
- Listed weight: 242 lb (110 kg)

Career information
- High school: Llano
- College: North Texas (1998–2001)
- NFL draft: 2002: undrafted

Career history
- Tennessee Titans (2002–2005); New York Jets (2006–2008)

Awards and highlights
- Sun Belt Defensive Player of the Year (2001); First-team All-Sun Belt (2001)

Career NFL statistics
- Total tackles: 291
- Forced fumbles: 3
- Fumble recoveries: 4
- Pass deflections: 9
- Interceptions: 1
- Defensive touchdowns: 1
- Stats at Pro Football Reference

Robert Bradley Kassell (born January 7, 1980) is an American former professional football player who was a linebacker in the National Football League (NFL). He played college football for the North Texas Mean Green and was signed by the Tennessee Titans as an undrafted free agent after the 2002 NFL draft. Kassell also played for the New York Jets.

== Early life ==
Kassell attended Llano High School in Llano, Texas and was a letterman in football as a quarterback. In football, as a senior, he rushed for 1431 yards and 20 touchdowns and passed for 839 yards and eight touchdowns. He was named the Class 3A All-West MVP, and won All-State second-team honors. Brad Kassell graduated from Llano High School in 1998.

== College career ==
Kassell was a four-year letterman who played in 44 games at the University of North Texas and was named Sun Belt Conference Defensive Player of the Year during his junior and senior season. Kassell received a unanimous first-team selection to the conference teams and was team MVP in his final two seasons. He ranks third on the school's all-time tackle list.

== Professional career ==
=== Tennessee Titans ===
In 2002, he was signed as an undrafted free agent by the Tennessee Titans. He played for the team from 2002 to 2005.

=== New York Jets ===
In 2006, Kassell was signed as a free agent by the New York Jets. He led the Jets special teams with 26 tackles in 2007. His only professional interception was returned for a touchdown in 2005.

On February 19, 2009, Kassell was released by the Jets.

== Other work ==
In 2012, Kassell joined Catz Sports Performance and Physical Therapy in Austin, Texas, as president and partner.

In 2014, he started teaching and coaching at Lago Vista High School in Lago Vista, Texas, coaching the linebacker position of the football team, powerlifting, and girls' track and field.

== NFL career statistics ==
Legend
**Bold**	Career high

=== Regular season ===
Year	Team	Games		Tackles					Interceptions					Fumbles			
Year	Team	GP	GS	Cmb	Solo	Ast	Sck	TFL	Int	Yds	TD	Lng	PD	FF	FR	Yds	TD
2002	TEN	9	0	8	6	2	0.0	0	0	0	0	0	0	**1**	0	0	0
2003	TEN	**16**	4	41	31	10	0.0	0	0	0	0	0	2	0	0	0	0
2004	TEN	15	**14**	**104**	**76**	**28**	0.0	**4**	0	0	0	0	1	**1**	1	0	0
2005	TEN	**16**	**14**	78	54	24	0.0	3	**1**	**21**	**1**	**21**	**4**	**1**	**3**	0	0
2006	NYJ	**16**	1	33	23	10	0.0	0	0	0	0	0	1	0	0	0	0
2007	NYJ	**16**	1	27	15	12	0.0	0	0	0	0	0	1	0	0	0	0
		88	34	291	205	86	0.0	7	1	21	1	21	9	3	4	0	0

=== Playoffs ===
Year	Team	Games		Tackles					Interceptions					Fumbles			
Year	Team	GP	GS	Cmb	Solo	Ast	Sck	TFL	Int	Yds	TD	Lng	PD	FF	FR	Yds	TD
2002	TEN	**2**	0	1	1	0	0.0	0	0	0	0	0	0	0	0	0	0
2003	TEN	**2**	**1**	**11**	**7**	**4**	0.0	0	0	0	0	0	0	0	0	0	0
2006	NYJ	1	0	4	3	1	0.0	0	0	0	0	0	0	0	0	0	0
		5	1	16	11	5	0.0	0	0	0	0	0	0	0	0	0	0
