= Cody Spencer =

American football player and coach (born 1981)

No. 53, 56
- Position: Linebacker

Personal information
- Born: June 1, 1981 (age 45); Port Lavaca, Texas, U.S.
- Listed height: 6 ft 2 in (1.88 m)
- Listed weight: 245 lb (111 kg)

Career information
- High school: Grapevine (TX)
- College: North Texas
- NFL draft: 2004: 6th round, 182nd overall pick

Career history

Playing
- Oakland Raiders (2004)*; Tennessee Titans (2004–2005); New York Jets (2006–2008); Detroit Lions (2009)
- * Offseason or practice squad member only

Coaching
- Texarkana (TX) Texas (2010–2014) Assistant coach

Awards and highlights
- 3× First-team All-Sun Belt (2001–2003); UNT Hall of Fame; UNT All Century Team

Career NFL statistics
- Total tackles: 68
- Fumble recoveries: 1
- Stats at Pro Football Reference

Thomas Cody Spencer (born June 1, 1981) is an American former professional football player who was a linebacker in the National Football League (NFL). He played college football for North Texas Mean Green and was selected by the Oakland Raiders in the sixth round of the 2004 NFL draft.

Spencer was also a member of the Tennessee Titans and New York Jets.

== Early life ==
Spencer won two state championships at Grapevine high school. Three-year starter for North Texas and two-time all-conference first-team selection.

- Three-time winner of Byron Gross Award, presented to team's outstanding LB, who started 33 of 41 games during college career and totaled 297 tackles (154 solos), seven sacks, 22 TFL, two FR, one FF, seven INTs and eight PDs.
- As senior, led Mean Green with 121 tackles and added two sacks, five TFL and three PD en route to earning All-Sun Belt Conference honors.
- As junior, earned all-conference first-team honors despite missing nearly four games with injury, totaling 66 tackles, three INTs, and five sacks.
- Limited to ST duties as UNT freshman before earning starting job at strongside LB as sophomore, then shifting to MLB as junior.
- Attended Grapevine (TX) HS, where he was named all-district first-teamer at TE as junior when Grapevine won Class 4A Division I title, and all-district second-teamer at OLB as senior.

Off the field

- Majored in applied arts.
- Most summers as a youth, Spencer spent time on Gulf of Mexico, working with grandfather, George Spencer, on shrimping boat based out of Seadrift, TX.
- Older brother Jeremy is member of U.S. Army and is now serving third term in Iraq.
- He, wife, Kristin, and son, Gage, split time between Nashville, TN, and Grapevine, TX.
- Has interest in coaching after playing career.
- Enjoys hunting and fishing in spare time.

Spencer attended Grapevine High School in Grapevine, Texas. State Champs '96/'98

== Coaching career ==
After leaving the NFL, he accepted the job at Texas High School in Texarkana, Texas. He coached there from 2010 to 2014. Served as the Special Teams coordinator and Defensive coordinator.

== Post-football career ==
After the 2014 season, he moved back to his home area to work as a fishing guide. Following guiding, he got a better opportunity and now runs a 72 ft Viking sport fisher.
