= 2001 Alabama Crimson Tide football team =

American college football season

2001 Alabama Crimson Tide football

Independence Bowl champion

Independence Bowl, W 14–13 vs. Iowa State
- Conference: Southeastern Conference
- Western Division
- Record: 7–5 (4–4 SEC)
- Head coach: Dennis Franchione (1st season)
- Offensive coordinator: Les Koenning (1st season)
- Offensive scheme: Multiple
- Defensive coordinator: Carl Torbush (1st season)
- Base defense: 4–3
- Captains: Jarret Johnson; Terry Jones; Saleem Rasheed; Tyler Watts; Andrew Zow
- Home stadium: Bryant–Denny Stadium; Legion Field

2001 Southeastern Conference football standings
	Conf.			Overall
Team	W		L	W		L
Eastern Division
No. 4 Tennessee x	7	–	1	11	–	2
No. 3 Florida %	6	–	2	10	–	2
No. 13 South Carolina	5	–	3	9	–	3
No. 22 Georgia	5	–	3	8	–	4
Kentucky	1	–	7	2	–	9
Vanderbilt	0	–	8	2	–	9
Western Division
No. 7 LSU xy$	5	–	3	10	–	3
Auburn x	5	–	3	7	–	5
Ole Miss	4	–	4	7	–	4
Alabama	4	–	4	7	–	5
Arkansas	4	–	4	7	–	5
Mississippi State	2	–	6	3	–	8
Championship: LSU 31, Tennessee 20
$ – BCS representative as conference champion; % – BCS at-large representative; x – Division champion/co-champions; y – Championship game participant; Rankings from AP Poll

The 2001 Alabama Crimson Tide football team represented the University of Alabama as a member of the Southeastern Conference (SEC) during 2001 NCAA Division I-A football season. Led by first-year head coach Dennis Franchione, the Crimson Tide compiled an overall record of 7–5 with a mark of 4–4 in conference play, placing in a three-way tie for third in the SEC's Western Division. Alabama was invited to the Independence Bowl, where the Crimson Tide defeated Iowa State. The team played home games at Bryant–Denny Stadium in Tuscaloosa, Alabama, and Legion Field in Birmingham, Alabama.

== Schedule ==
Date	Time	Opponent	Rank	Site	TV	Result	Attendance	Source
September 1	6:45 p.m.	No. 17 UCLA*	No. 25	Bryant–Denny Stadium; Tuscaloosa, AL (College GameDay)	ESPN	L 17–20	83,818	
September 8	11:30 a.m.	at Vanderbilt		Vanderbilt Stadium; Nashville, TN	JPS	W 12–9	37,318	
September 22	2:30 p.m.	Arkansas		Bryant–Denny Stadium; Tuscaloosa, AL	CBS	W 31–10	83,818	
September 29	11:30 a.m.	at No. 15 South Carolina		Williams–Brice Stadium; Columbia, SC	JPS	L 36–37	84,100	
October 6	2:00 p.m.	UTEP*		Legion Field; Birmingham, AL	PPV	W 56–7	77,146	
October 13	11:30 a.m.	at Ole Miss		Vaught–Hemingway Stadium; Oxford, MS (rivalry)	JPS	L 24–27	47,110	
October 20	2:30 p.m.	No. 11 Tennessee		Bryant–Denny Stadium; Tuscaloosa, AL (Third Saturday in October)	CBS	L 24–35	83,818	
November 3	2:30 p.m.	LSU^{†}		Bryant–Denny Stadium; Tuscaloosa, AL (rivalry)	CBS	L 21–35	83,818	
November 10	11:30 a.m.	Mississippi State		Bryant–Denny Stadium; Tuscaloosa, AL (rivalry)	JPS	W 24–17	83,818	
November 17	2:30 p.m.	at No. 17 Auburn		Jordan-Hare Stadium; Auburn, AL (Iron Bowl)	CBS	W 31–7	86,063	
November 29	6:05 p.m.	Southern Miss*		Legion Field; Birmingham, AL	ESPN2	W 28–15	79,947	
December 27	6:30 p.m.	vs. Iowa State*		Independence Stadium; Shreveport, LA (Independence Bowl)	ESPN	W 14–13	45,627	
*Non-conference game; ^{†}Homecoming; Rankings from AP Poll released prior to the game; All times are in Central time

== Rankings ==
Ranking movements Legend: ██ Increase in ranking ██ Decrease in ranking — = Not ranked
	Week																
Poll	Pre	1	2	3	4	5	6	7	8	9	10	11	12	13	14	15	Final
AP	25	25	—	—	—	—	—	—	—	—	—	—	—	—	—	—	—
Coaches	25	25	—	—	—	—	—	—	—	—	—	—	—	—	—	—	—
BCS	Not released								—	—	—	—	—	—	—	—	Not released

== Game summaries ==
=== UCLA ===
	1	2	3	4	Total
Bruins	0	7	13	0	20
Crimson Tide	7	3	0	7	17

Dennis Franchione's first game as Alabama's head coach pitted the Crimson Tide against the Bruins of the Pacific-10 Conference. ESPN's College Gameday was in Tuscaloosa for the first time ever (they had previously visited Alabama home games at Legion Field in Birmingham). Although Alabama outgained UCLA in total offense 458–291, the Bruins were victorious by a final score of 20–17 before a sold-out home crowd. The Tide took an early 10–0 lead on a 78-yard Antonio Carter touchdown reception from Tyler Watts and 30-yard Neal Thomas field goal. UCLA responded with 20 consecutive points to take a lead that would not be relinquished. The final Alabama score came late in the fourth on a 71-yard touchdown pass from Andrew Zow to Freddie Milons. The 2001 meeting marked the third all-time meeting between the two schools.

Statistics	UCLA	Alabama
First downs	13	17
Total yards	291	458
Rushing yards	168	159
Passing yards	123	299
Turnovers	0	2
Time of possession	26:29	33:31

Team	Category	Player	Statistics
UCLA	Passing	Cory Paus	8–22, 123 yards, 1 TD
UCLA	Rushing	DeShaun Foster	22 carries, 110 yards
UCLA	Receiving	Tab Perry	5 receptions, 113 yards, 1 TD
Alabama	Passing	Tyler Watts	12–22, 204 yards, 1 TD, 1 INT
Alabama	Rushing	Ahmaad Galloway	21 carries, 76 yards
Alabama	Receiving	Freddie Milons	4 receptions, 124 yards, 1TD

=== Vanderbilt ===
	1	2	3	4	Total
Crimson Tide	0	6	3	3	12
Commodores	3	3	0	3	9

Dennis Franchione notched his first win as head coach of the Crimson Tide, in a game of field goals, and defeated Vanderbilt 12–9.

Statistics	Alabama	Vanderbilt
First downs	17	20
Total yards	357	396
Rushing yards	229	143
Passing yards	128	253
Turnovers	0	1
Time of possession	30:19	29:41

Team	Category	Player	Statistics
Alabama	Passing	Tyler Watts	10–17, 128 yards
Alabama	Rushing	Ahmaad Galloway	24 carries, 144 yards
Alabama	Receiving	Antonio Carter	3 receptions, 30 yards
Vanderbilt	Passing	Greg Zolman	17–34, 253 yards
Vanderbilt	Rushing	Lew Thomas	10 carries, 89 yards
Vanderbilt	Receiving	Dan Stricker	3 receptions, 75 yards

=== Arkansas ===
	1	2	3	4	Total
Arkansas	3	7	0	0	10
Crimson Tide	7	7	10	7	31

As a result of the September 11 Attacks, the September 15, 2001, contest with Southern Miss was postponed, resulting in the Razorbacks being the Tide's third opponent on the season. Although outgained in total offense, a pair of defensive touchdowns put the Tide over the top before an emotional home crowd 31–10. Bama would score its first points on an 11-yard Ahmaad Galloway touchdown run to take a 7–3 lead in the first quarter. In the second, the teams would alternate touchdowns with Reggie Myles scoring on a 42-yard fumble recovery for the Tide and Brandon Holmes scoring on a 1-yard run to have Bama leading 14–10 at the half. The Tide would open their second half scoring with a 36-yard Neal Thomas field goal followed by a 39-yard Freddie Milons touchdown reception from Tyler Watts. The final points of the evening would come with only 00:20 remaining in the game when Thurman Ward returning an interception 60-yards for a touchdown.

Statistics	Arkansas	Alabama
First downs	21	11
Total yards	315	249
Rushing yards	106	116
Passing yards	209	133
Turnovers	4	2
Time of possession	35:28	24:32

Team	Category	Player	Statistics
Arkansas	Passing	Ryan Sorahan	14–19, 133 yards
Arkansas	Rushing	Brandon Holmes	17 carries, 81 yards, 1 TD
Arkansas	Receiving	George Wilson	7 receptions, 73 yards
Alabama	Passing	Tyler Watts	9–16, 133 yards, 1 TD
Alabama	Rushing	Ahmaad Galloway	20 carries, 63 yards, 1 TD
Alabama	Receiving	Freddie Milons	2 receptions, 45 yards, 1 TD

=== South Carolina ===
	1	2	3	4	Total
Crimson Tide	6	17	6	7	36
South Carolina	0	10	14	13	37

Although the Tide gained 516 yards of total offense, the Gamecocks prevailed by a final score of 37–36. The South Carolina victory marked their first victory over Alabama in school history.

Statistics	Alabama	South Carolina
First downs	30	17
Total yards	516	359
Rushing yards	285	68
Passing yards	231	291
Turnovers	3	2
Time of possession	38:55	21:05

Team	Category	Player	Statistics
Alabama	Passing	Tyler Watts	20–25, 231 yards, 1 TD, 1 INT
Alabama	Rushing	Tyler Watts	22 carries, 162 yards, 2 TD's
Alabama	Receiving	Freddie Milons	8 receptions, 72 yards
South Carolina	Passing	Phil Petty	19–33, 291 yards, 3 TD's
South Carolina	Rushing	Derek Watson	9 carries, 24 yards, 1 TD
South Carolina	Receiving	Matthew Thomas	4 receptions, 83 yards

=== UTEP ===
	1	2	3	4	Total
UTEP	0	0	0	7	7
Crimson Tide	21	21	7	7	56

The Tide gained 588 yards of total offense, and defeated the Miners by a final score of 56–7 in the first Legion Field game of the 2001 season. Bama scored 21 points in first on a pair of Donnie Lowe touchdown runs (2 and 1 yard respectively) and a 10-yard Triandos Luke touchdown reception from Tyler Watts. Another 21 points were scored in the second on a pair of Watts touchdown runs (16 and 9 yard respectively) and a 2-yard Luke touchdown reception to give Bama a 42–0 halftime lead. The scoring continued in the second half on a 12-yard Marvin Brown touchdown run and 2-yard Ray Hudson touchdown run. This was the most points Alabama had scored in a game since 1993 vs. Louisiana Tech (56-3).

Statistics	UTEP	Alabama
First downs	7	27
Total yards	232	588
Rushing yards	133	360
Passing yards	99	228
Turnovers	3	1
Time of possession	24:31	35:29

Team	Category	Player	Statistics
UTEP	Passing	Wesley Phillips	5–14, 60 yards, 1 INT
UTEP	Rushing	Jon Schaper	5 carries, 70 yards, 1 TD
UTEP	Receiving	Terrance Minor	2 receptions, 33 yards
Alabama	Passing	Tyler Watts	12–18, 147 yards, 2 TD's
Alabama	Rushing	Tyler Watts	9 carries, 101 yards, 2 TD's
Alabama	Receiving	Freddie Milons	4 receptions, 74 yards

=== Ole Miss ===
	1	2	3	4	Total
Crimson Tide	7	10	7	0	24
Ole Miss	0	14	0	13	27

Thirteen unanswered points in the fourth resulted in the Rebels defeating the Tide before the home crowd by a final score of 27–24. Bama scored first on a 6-yard Ahmaad Galloway touchdown run, only to have Ole Miss take the lead after touchdown runs on a 1-yard Toward Sanford run and 25-yard Joe Gunn run. The Tide responded with a 58-yard Sam Collins touchdown reception from Tyler Watts and 31 yard Neal Thomas field goal to take a 17–14 halftime lead.

Alabama extended their lead to 24–14 in the third on a 7-yard Triandos Luke touchdown reception. Ole Miss would respond with a 19-yard Charles Stackhouse touchdown run and Eli Manning hitting Gunn for a 3-yard touchdown pass to seal the victory with 00:46 remaining in the game. For the game, Ole Miss outgained the Tide 430–363 in total offense.

Statistics	Alabama	Ole Miss
First downs	15	22
Total yards	363	430
Rushing yards	227	105
Passing yards	136	325
Turnovers	1	1
Time of possession	26:33	33:27

Team	Category	Player	Statistics
Alabama	Passing	Tyler Watts	7–24, 136 yards 2 TD's, 1 INT
Alabama	Rushing	Tyler Watts	13 carries, 110 yards
Alabama	Receiving	Sam Collins	1 reception, 58 yards, 1 TD
Ole Miss	Passing	Eli Manning	22–41, 325 yards, 1 TD
Ole Miss	Rushing	Joe Gunn	14 carries, 78 yards, 1 TD
Ole Miss	Receiving	Chris Collins	8 receptions, 110 yards

=== Tennessee ===
	1	2	3	4	Total
Volunteers	7	7	7	14	35
Crimson Tide	3	7	14	0	24

Although Alabama took a 24–21 lead into the fourth quarter, 14 unanswered points in the fourth resulted in Bama losing its seventh consecutive contest to the Vols in the annual Third Saturday in October game. After falling behind 14–3 on a 21-yard pass from Casey Clausen to Donté Stallworth and a 60-yard Travis Stephens run, the Tide responded with a pair of Sam Collins touchdown receptions to take a 17–14 lead.

The Vols responded and took a 21–17 lead following a 21-yard Jason Witten touchdown reception, only to again fall behind 24–21 after a four-yard Ahmaad Galloway touchdown run. Tennessee again came from behind and dominated the fourth quarter and seal the victory with a one-yard Clausen and one-yard Stephens touchdown runs in the fourth.

Statistics	Tennessee	Alabama
First downs	23	13
Total yards	480	328
Rushing yards	187	163
Passing yards	293	165
Turnovers	0	0
Time of possession	36:19	23:41

Team	Category	Player	Statistics
Tennessee	Passing	Casey Clausen	21–28, 293 yards, 2 TD's
Tennessee	Rushing	Travis Stephens	33 carries, 162 yards, 2 TD's
Tennessee	Receiving	Kelley Washington	4 receptions, 93 yards
Alabama	Passing	Tyler Watts	10–23, 165 yards, 2 TD's
Alabama	Rushing	Santonio Beard	10 carries, 141 yards
Alabama	Receiving	Freddie Milons	2 receptions, 46 yards

=== LSU ===
	1	2	3	4	Total
Tigers	14	0	14	7	35
Crimson Tide	0	10	11	0	21

On homecoming in Tuscaloosa, LSU dominated in gaining 611 yards of total offense (with a record 528 yards through the air) and defeated the Tide 35–21. LSU took a 14–0 lead in the first quarter on a 3-yard LaBrandon Toefield run and a 34-yard touchdown pass from Rohan Davey to Jerel Myers. Bama responded in the second with a 22-yard Neal Thomas field goal and 5-yard touchdown pass from Tyler Watts to Terry Jones to make the score to 14–10 at the half.

Early in the third, Toefield again scored on a two-yard run to give the Tigers a 21–10 lead. Bama tied the game at 21 after another Thomas field goal and 22-yard Watts touchdown run. LSU responded and scored on a 25-yard Josh Reed touchdown reception late in the third and on a 6-yard Toefield touchdown run in the fourth. Reed's 293 yards receiving set a SEC record for receiving yardage in a game.

Statistics	LSU	Alabama
First downs	30	18
Total yards	611	383
Rushing yards	83	174
Passing yards	528	209
Turnovers	3	1
Time of possession	31:02	28:58

Team	Category	Player	Statistics
LSU	Passing	Rohan Davey	35–44, 528 yards, 2 TD's, 1 INT
LSU	Rushing	LaBrandon Toefield	23 carries, 73 yards, 3 TD's
LSU	Receiving	Josh Reed	19 receptions, 293 yards, 1 TD
Alabama	Passing	Tyler Watts	13–22, 165 yards, 1 TD
Alabama	Rushing	Tyler Watts	21 carries, 86 yards, 1 TD
Alabama	Receiving	Freddie Milons	5 receptions, 91 yards

=== Mississippi State ===
	1	2	3	4	Total
Bulldogs	0	7	10	0	17
Crimson Tide	7	3	0	14	24

Bama put an end to a three-game losing streak and defeated the Bulldogs of Mississippi State 24–17 before the home crowd. The Tide took a 10–0 lead late into the second quarter on a 6-yard Santonio Beard touchdown run and 20-yard Neal Thomas field goal. The Bulldogs answered, and scored the next 17 points on a pair of Kevin Fant touchdown passes and a 43-yard John M. Marlin field goal to take a 17–10 lead into the fourth quarter. In the fourth, Andrew Zow hit Donnie Lowe for a 10-yard touchdown strike to tie the game at 17, with Beard scoring his second touchdown on a game-winning, 14-yard run.

Statistics	Mississippi State	Alabama
First downs	16	22
Total yards	300	401
Rushing yards	117	228
Passing yards	183	173
Turnovers	1	2
Time of possession	29:38	30:22

Team	Category	Player	Statistics
Mississippi State	Passing	Kevin Fant	17–29, 175 yards, 2 TD's
Mississippi State	Rushing	Dontae Walker	15 carries, 101 yards
Mississippi State	Receiving	Dicenzo Miller	2 receptions, 43 yards, 1 TD
Alabama	Passing	Andrew Zow	12–22, 157 yards, 1 TD
Alabama	Rushing	Santonio Beard	15 carries, 95 yards, 2 TD's
Alabama	Receiving	Antonio Carter	4 receptions, 58 yards

=== Auburn ===
	1	2	3	4	Total
Crimson Tide	0	14	7	10	31
Tigers	0	7	0	0	7

On The Plains, Alabama outgained the Tigers in total offense 549–272 and secured the Tide's upset victory at Auburn 31–7 in the 2001 Iron Bowl. After a scoreless first, Bama scored first on an eight-yard Santonio Beard touchdown run. Auburn answered with their lone score on a 5-yard Ronnie Brown run. The Tide scored next with Andrew Zow connecting with Jason McAddley for a 45-yard touchdown strike to give the visitors a 14–7 lead at the half.

The second half again saw the Tide strike early on a 47-yard Beard run, with the final scores coming in the fourth on a 10-yard Terry Jones touchdown reception and a 26-yard Neal Thomas field goal. Although slightly outgained in passing yardage 221–231, Bama outrushed the Tigers 328–41 to give Alabama the 31–7 victory.

Statistics	Alabama	Auburn
First downs	25	15
Total yards	549	272
Rushing yards	328	41
Passing yards	221	231
Turnovers	0	1
Time of possession	34:01	25:59

Team	Category	Player	Statistics
Alabama	Passing	Andrew Zow	22–29, 221 yards, 2 TD's
Alabama	Rushing	Santonio Beard	20 carries, 199 yards, 2 TD's
Alabama	Receiving	Freddie Milons	6 receptions, 79 yards
Auburn	Passing	Daniel Cobb	9–17, 139 yards
Auburn	Rushing	Ronnie Brown	15 carries, 41 yards, 1 TD
Auburn	Receiving	Robert Johnson	2 receptions, 47 yards

=== Southern Miss ===
	1	2	3	4	Total
Golden Eagles	0	6	9	0	15
Crimson Tide	0	7	15	6	28

The contest against the Golden Eagles was originally to have been played on September 15, 2001; however, as a result of the September 11 attacks, the game was postponed and subsequently played on November 29, a Thursday night, at Legion Field. Although mired in rainy and windy conditions, both Ahmaad Galloway (on runs of 40 and 11 yards respectively) and Andrew Zow (on a 14-yard pass to Sam Collins, and a 26-yard pass to Freddie Milons) each notched a pair of touchdowns in the victory.

Statistics	Southern Miss	Alabama
First downs	22	16
Total yards	286	311
Rushing yards	47	221
Passing yards	239	90
Turnovers	3	3
Time of possession	33:26	26:34

Team	Category	Player	Statistics
Southern Miss	Passing	Jeff Kelly	23–36, 239 yards 2 TD's, 1 INT
Southern Miss	Rushing	James Walley	22 carries, 65 yards
Southern Miss	Receiving	Leroy Handy	7 receptions, 80 yards, 2 TD's
Alabama	Passing	Andrew Zow	7–19, 90 yards, 2 TD's, 1 INT
Alabama	Rushing	Ahmaad Galloway	24 carries, 126 yards, 2 TD's
Alabama	Receiving	Freddie Milons	2 receptions, 44 yards, 1 TD

=== Iowa State ===
	1	2	3	4	Total
Cyclones	3	7	3	0	13
Crimson Tide	0	7	0	7	14

In the 26th annual Independence Bowl, the Tide struggled against the Cyclones offensively and were outgained 456 yards of offense to 269, but a missed 47-yard field goal attempt with 46 seconds left in the game sealed the victory for Alabama.

Statistics	Iowa State	Alabama
First downs	23	15
Total yards	456	269
Rushing yards	172	150
Passing yards	284	119
Turnovers	0	1
Time of possession	30:38	29:22

Team	Category	Player	Statistics
Iowa State	Passing	Seneca Wallace	25–42, 284 yards
Iowa State	Rushing	Ennis Haywood	20 carries, 125 yards
Iowa State	Receiving	Craig Campbell	7 receptions, 109 yards
Alabama	Passing	Andrew Zow	11–19, 119 yards, 1 TD, 1 INT
Alabama	Rushing	Ahmaad Galloway	16 carries, 90 yards
Alabama	Receiving	Terry Jones	2 receptions, 44 yards, 1 TD

== Personnel ==
=== Coaching staff ===
Name	Position	Consecutive seasons at Alabama
Dennis Franchione	Head coach	1st
Les Koenning	Offensive coordinator/quarterback coach	1st
Kenith Pope	Assistant head coach/wide receivers coach	1st
Jim Bob Helduser	Offensive line coach	1st
Mark Tommerdahl	Special teams coordinator/tight end coach	1st
Lee Fobbs	Running backs coach	1st
Carl Torbush	Defensive coordinator/ Linebackers coach	1st
Chris Thurmond	Cornerbacks coach	1st
Ron Case	Safeties coach	1st
Stan Eggen	Defensive line coach	1st

=== Roster ===
2001 Alabama Crimson Tide football team roster
Players
Coaches
Offense

Pos.	#	Name	Class
QB	14	Tyler Watts	Jr
WR	19	Josh Averett	Fr
OT	65	Dante Ellington	Fr
C	58	Alonzo Ephraim	Jr
TE	82	Terry Jones	Sr
WR	84	Triandos Luke	So
C	51	Evan Mathis	Fr
WR	80	Jason McAddley	Sr
WR	15	Freddie Milons	Sr
RB	29	Ahmad Galloway	Jr
QB	13	Spencer Pennington	Fr
G	71	Marico Portis	Jr
G	78	Justin Smiley	Fr
RB	27	Ray Hudson	So
QB	5	Andrew Zow	Sr

Defense

Pos.	#	Name	Class
DB	24	Waine Bacon	Jr
DT	97	Anthony Bryant	Fr
CB	41	Roman Harper	Fr
DE	96	Jarret Johnson	Jr
DT	55	Kenny King	Jr
DE	54	Kindal Moorehead	Jr
DB	23	Reggie Myles	Sr
DE	98	Antwan Odom	So
DB	26	Charlie Peprah	Fr
LB	11	Saleem Rasheed	Sr
LB	15	Cornelius Wortham	Fr

Special teams

Pos.	#	Name	Class
PK	27	Gabe Giardina	Fr

Head coach

- Dennis Franchione

Coordinators/assistant coaches

- Mike Bloomgren (Graduate assistant)

Legend

- (C) Team captain
- (S) Suspended
- (I) Ineligible
- Injured
- Redshirt

Roster

=== Recruiting class ===
College recruiting
Name	Hometown	School	Height	Weight	Commit date
Mark Anderson; TE	Tulsa, OK	Booker T. Washington High School	6 ft 5 in (1.96 m)	210 lb (95 kg)	Jan 23, 2001
Mark Anderson; TE	Recruit ratings: No ratings found				
Bryan Bass; WR	Fayette, AL	Westminster Academy	6 ft 1 in (1.85 m)	180 lb (82 kg)	Feb 7, 2001
Bryan Bass; WR	Recruit ratings: No ratings found				
Todd Bates; LB	Heflin, AL	Cleburne County High School	6 ft 4 in (1.93 m)	220 lb (100 kg)	Jan 25, 2001
Todd Bates; LB	Recruit ratings: No ratings found				
Quentin Bowens; FB	Killen, AL	Brooks High School	6 ft 0 in (1.83 m)	265 lb (120 kg)	
Quentin Bowens; FB	Recruit ratings: No ratings found				
Brandon Brooks; WR	Irondale, AL	Shades Valley High School	5 ft 4 in (1.63 m)	152 lb (69 kg)	
Brandon Brooks; WR	Recruit ratings: No ratings found				
Donald Clark; TE	Boca Raton, FL	Fort Scott Community College	6 ft 6 in (1.98 m)	260 lb (120 kg)	Jan 16, 2001
Donald Clark; TE	Recruit ratings: No ratings found				
J.B. Closner; OL	San Antonio, TX	Tom C. Clark High School	6 ft 4 in (1.93 m)	290 lb (130 kg)	
J.B. Closner; OL	Recruit ratings: No ratings found				
Brodie Croyle; QB	Rainbow City, AL	Westbrook Christian School	6 ft 2 in (1.88 m)	185 lb (84 kg)	
Brodie Croyle; QB	Recruit ratings: No ratings found				
Marquez Dupree; RB	Philadelphia, MS	Philadelphia High School	6 ft 0 in (1.83 m)	215 lb (98 kg)	
Marquez Dupree; RB	Recruit ratings: No ratings found				
Von Ewing; OT	Troy, AL	Charles Henderson High School	6 ft 5 in (1.96 m)	297 lb (135 kg)	Jan 27, 2001
Von Ewing; OT	Recruit ratings: No ratings found				
Roman Harper; DB	Prattville, AL	Prattville High School	6 ft 1 in (1.85 m)	180 lb (82 kg)	Feb 7, 2001
Roman Harper; DB	Recruit ratings: No ratings found				
Atlas Herrion; OL	Daphne, AL	Dodge City Community College	6 ft 5 in (1.96 m)	299 lb (136 kg)	Feb 7, 2001
Atlas Herrion; OL	Recruit ratings: No ratings found				
Clint Johnston; TE	Wetumpka, AL	Wetumpka High School	6 ft 4 in (1.93 m)	235 lb (107 kg)	Feb 7, 2001
Clint Johnston; TE	Recruit ratings: No ratings found				
Juke King; DE	Theodore, AL	Theodore High School	6 ft 2 in (1.88 m)	205 lb (93 kg)	
Juke King; DE	Recruit ratings: No ratings found				
Anthony Madison; DB	Thomasville, AL	Thomasville High School	5 ft 9 in (1.75 m)	180 lb (82 kg)	
Anthony Madison; DB	Recruit ratings: No ratings found				
Mike McLaughlin; PK	Gautier, MS	Gautier High School	6 ft 1 in (1.85 m)	190 lb (86 kg)	Feb 7, 2001
Mike McLaughlin; PK	Recruit ratings: No ratings found				
Spencer Pennington; QB	Fayette, AL	Fayette County High School	6 ft 4 in (1.93 m)	215 lb (98 kg)	Feb 7, 2001
Spencer Pennington; QB	Recruit ratings: No ratings found				
Charlie Peprah; DB	Plano, TX	Plano East Senior High School	6 ft 1 in (1.85 m)	184 lb (83 kg)	Jan 28, 2001
Charlie Peprah; DB	Recruit ratings: No ratings found				
Freddie Roach; LB	Killen, AL	Brooks High School	6 ft 2 in (1.88 m)	225 lb (102 kg)	Feb 7, 2001
Freddie Roach; LB	Recruit ratings: No ratings found				
Mark Sanders; OL	Ashville, AL	Ashville High School	6 ft 7 in (2.01 m)	305 lb (138 kg)	Feb 7, 2001
Mark Sanders; OL	Recruit ratings: No ratings found				
Mac Tyler; DL	Bessemer, AL	Milford Academy	6 ft 6 in (1.98 m)	335 lb (152 kg)	
Mac Tyler; DL	Recruit ratings: No ratings found				
Overall recruit ranking:
Note: In many cases, Scout, Rivals, 247Sports, On3, and ESPN may conflict in their listings of height and weight.; In these cases, the average was taken. ESPN grades are on a 100-point scale.; Sources: "Alabama Signee List 2001". Rivals.; "Scout.com Football Recruiting: Alabama". Scout.; "2001 Player Signees- Alabama". ESPN.; "Scout.com Team Recruiting Rankings". Scout.; "2001 Team Ranking". Rivals.com.

== Statistics ==
=== Team ===
	Team	Opp
Scoring	304	219
Points per game	27.6	19.9
First downs	211	206
Rushing	119	73
Passing	80	114
Penalty	12	19
Total offense	4503	3972
Avg per play	6.2	5.4
Avg per game	409.4	361.1
Fumbles-Lost	24–10	27–13
Penalties-Yards	93–737	67–565
Avg per game	67.0	51.4

	Team	Opp
Punts-Yards	52–2,016	54–2,151
Avg per punt	38.8	39.8
Time of possession/Game	30:16	29:44
3rd down conversions	66/156	60/154
4th down conversions	1–6	7–17
Touchdowns scored	37	28
Field goals-Attempts	15–21	8–16
PAT-Attempts	33–35	25–28
Attendance	576,183	254,591
Games/Avg per Game	82,312	63,648

==== Scores by quarter ====
	1	2	3	4	Total
Alabama	58	105	80	61	304
Opponents	27	68	67	57	219

=== Offense ===
==== Rushing ====
Name	GP	Att	Yards	Avg	TD	Long	Avg/G
Ahmaad Galloway	11	174	881	5.1	6	40	80.1
Santonio Beard	8	77	633	8.2	4	69	79.1
Tyler Watts	9	111	564	5.1	5	32	62.7
Ray Hudson	11	37	205	5.5	1	35	18.6
Donnie Lowe	9	19	78	4.1	2	19	8.7
Andrew Zow	6	29	69	2.4	0	18	11.5
Marvin Brown	10	9	54	6.0	1	13	5.4
Freddie Milons	11	4	10	2.5	0	13	0.9
Jonathan Richey	11	3	6	2.0	0	6	0.5
Nick Signaigo	1	1	4	4.0	0	4	4.0
Brandon Miree	2	3	3	0.7	0	3	1.0
Neal Thomas	11	1	0	0	0	0	0
TEAM	4	3	−5	−1.7	0	0	−1.2
Dre Fulgham	8	1	−11	−11	0	0	−1.4
Total	11	472	2,490	5.3	19	69	226.4
Opponents	11	382	1,198	3.1	15	74	108.9

==== Passing ====
Name	GP	Effic	Att-Cmp-Int	Pct	Yds	TD	Lng	Avg/G
Tyler Watts	9	135.06	172–94–3	54.7	1,325	10	78	147.2
Andrew Zow	6	143.06	83–48–2	57.8	654	6	71	109.0
Antonio Carter	11	192.80	2–1–0	50.0	34	0	34	3.1
Jonathan Richey	11	0.00	2–0–0	50.0	0	0	0	0
TEAM	4	0.00	1–0–0	50.0	0	0	0	0
Total	11	136.50	260–143–5	55.0	2,013	16	78	183.0
Opponents	11	131.64	360–210–6	58.3	2,774	13	58	252.2

==== Receiving ====
Name	GP	No.	Yds	Avg	TD	Long	Avg/G
Freddie Milons	11	36	626	17.4	3	71	56.9
Antonio Carter	11	32	428	13.4	1	78	38.9
Jason McAddley	11	18	259	14.4	2	45	23.5
Sam Collins	11	18	252	14.0	4	58	22.9
Triandos Luke	11	15	152	10.1	3	29	13.8
Terry Jones	11	12	156	13.0	2	39	14.2
Donnie Lowe	9	3	26	8.7	1	12	12.9
Ahmaad Galloway	11	3	20	6.7	0	7	1.8
Dre Fulgham	8	2	42	21.0	0	34	5.2
Ray Hudson	11	1	26	26.0	0	26	2.4
Theo Sanders	11	1	26	26.0	0	26	2.4
Santonio Beard	8	1	8	8.0	0	8	1.0
Marico Portis	11	1	−8	−8.0	0	0	−0.7
Total	11	143	2,013	14.1	16	78	183.0
Opponents	11	210	2,774	13.2	13	58	252.2
