= 2001 Independence Bowl =

2001 MainStay Independence Bowl
Alabama Crimson Tide	Iowa State Cyclones
(6–5)	(7–4)
SEC	Big 12
14	13
Head coach: Dennis Franchione	Head coach: Dan McCarney
	1	2	3	4	Total
Alabama	0	7	0	7	14
Iowa State	3	7	3	0	13
- Date: December 27, 2001
- Season: 2001
- Stadium: Independence Stadium
- Location: Shreveport, Louisiana
- MVP: QB Seneca Wallace (Iowa State); S Waine Bacon (Alabama); LB Matt Word (Iowa State)
- Referee: Ron Cherry (ACC)
- Attendance: 45,627
- Payout: US$2,344,214

United States TV coverage
- Network: ESPN
- Announcers: Rich Waltz (Play by Play); Mark May (Analyst); Heather Cox (Sideline)

The 2001 MainStay Independence Bowl, part of the 2001–02 bowl game season, took place on December 27, 2001, at Independence Stadium in Shreveport, Louisiana. The competing teams were the Alabama Crimson Tide, representing the Southeastern Conference (SEC), and the Iowa State Cyclones of the Big 12 Conference (Big 12). Alabama won the game, 14–13 in what was the first all-time game between the programs. It was also the first bowl game for Dennis Franchione at Alabama and the second bowl game for Dan McCarney at Iowa State.

== Teams ==
=== Alabama ===
The 2001 Alabama squad finished the regular season with a 6–5 record in head coach Dennis Franchione's first season leading the Crimson Tide. Through eight games, the Crimson Tide were 3–5 with losses to UCLA, South Carolina, Ole Miss, Tennessee and LSU. However, Alabama was able to win their final three games against Mississippi State, Auburn and Southern Miss to finish the regular season bowl eligible with a 6–5 record.

On December 9, Alabama accepted a bid to play in the Independence Bowl for the first time in school history. There was some controversy with the selection of Alabama instead over Ole Miss, as the Rebels (which did not go to a bowl in 2001) had beaten Alabama that year and had a better record of 7–4. Presumably, Alabama was selected because it had a larger fan base and Ole Miss had just played in the Independence Bowl in 1998 and 1999. The appearance marked the 51st all-time bowl appearance for Alabama.

=== Iowa State ===
Iowa State finished the regular season with a 7–4 record with losses against Nebraska, Texas A&M, Kansas State and Colorado. On December 9, Iowa State accepted a bid to play in the Independence Bowl for the first time in school history. The appearance marked the sixth all-time bowl appearance for the Cyclones.

== Game summary ==
Iowa State scored first on a 36-yard Tony Yelk field goal to lead 3–0 in the first quarter. After reaching the 1-yard line on a 33-yard catch by Lane Danielsen to close the quarter, the Cyclones scored the game's first touchdown on a 1-yard run by Joe Woodley, for a 10–0 lead. Alabama responded later in the quarter with an 8-yard touchdown run by Andrew Zow to close the gap to 10–7. Yelk missed a 25-yard field goal with 26 seconds remaining in the quarter, to keep the score 10–7 at the half.

Third quarter scoring was limited to a 41-yard Yelk field goal to bring the Cyclones' lead to 13–7 heading into the fourth. With 5:31 remaining in the game, Waine Bacon blocked a Yelk punt and Alabama recovered at the Iowa State 29-yard line. Two plays later, Zow hit Terry Jones for a 27-yard touchdown reception, and the extra point gave the Crimson Tide a 14–13 lead.

The Cyclones drove and attempted a late field goal. The kick sailed over the upright and was ruled no good. The victory sent Alabama to a 7–5 overall record for the season.

Scoring summary

Quarter	Time	Drive			Team	Scoring information	Score	
Quarter	Time	Plays	Yards	TOP	Team	Scoring information	Alabama	Iowa State
1	13:18	5	48	1:42	Iowa State	36-yard field goal by Tony Yelk	0	3
2	14:26	5	60	1:49	Iowa State	Joe Woodley 1-yard touchdown run, Tony Yelk kick good	0	10
2	9:19	10	80	5:07	Alabama	Andrew Zow 8-yard touchdown run, Neal Thomas kick good	7	10
3	2:11	6	31	1:57	Iowa State	41-yard field goal by Tony Yelk	7	13
4	4:44	2	29	0:47	Alabama	Terry Jones 27-yard touchdown reception from Andrew Zow, Neal Thomas kick good	14	13
"TOP" = time of possession. For other American football terms, see Glossary of American football.							14	13
