= 2001 All-SEC football team =

Team selected for the All-Southeastern Conference in 2001

The 2001 All-SEC football team consists of American football players selected to the All-Southeastern Conference (SEC) chosen by various selectors for the 2001 NCAA Division I-A football season.

The LSU Tigers won the conference, upsetting the Tennessee Volunteers 31 to 20 in the SEC Championship game. Tennessee had previously upset the preseason #1 Florida Gators 34 to 32 in a game rescheduled due to the 9/11 Attacks. All three teams finished in top ten of both the AP and coaches poll, with Florida and Tennessee ranking in both of the top five. Florida led the conference with five consensus first-team All-SEC selections by both the AP and the coaches. Both LSU and Tennessee tied for second with three.

Florida quarterback Rex Grossman, the runner-up for the Heisman Trophy, was voted the coaches SEC Player of the Year and AP SEC Offensive Player of the Year. Florida defensive end Alex Brown was the AP SEC Defensive Player of the Year.

== Offensive selections ==
=== Quarterbacks ===
- Rex Grossman†, Florida (AP-1, Coaches-1)
- Rohan Davey, LSU (AP-2, Coaches-2)

=== Running backs ===
- Travis Stephens†, Tennessee (AP-1, Coaches-1)
- LaBrandon Toefield*, LSU (AP-1, Coaches-1)
- Joe Gunn, Ole Miss (AP-2, Coaches-2)
- Earnest Graham, Florida (AP-2)
- Fred Talley, Arkansas (Coaches-2)
- Lew Thomas, Vanderbilt (Coaches-2)

=== Wide receivers ===
- Jabar Gaffney†, Florida (AP-1, Coaches-1)
- Josh Reed*, LSU (AP-1, Coaches-1)
- Reche Caldwell, Florida (AP-2, Coaches-2)
- Dan Stricker, Vanderbilt (AP-2, Coaches-2)
- Donté Stallworth, Tennessee (Coaches-2)
- Kelley Washington, Tennessee (Coaches-2)

=== Centers ===
- Zac Zedalis, Florida (AP-2 [as g], Coaches-1)
- Alonzo Ephraim, Alabama (AP-1)
- Ben Claxton, Ole Miss (AP-2, Coaches-2)
- Curt McGill, Georgia (AP-2, Coaches-2)

=== Guards ===
- Fred Weary, Tennessee (AP-1, Coaches-1)
- Kendall Simmons, Auburn (AP-1, Coaches-1)
- Kenny Sandlin, Alabama (AP-2)
- Shane Hall, South Carolina (Coaches-2)

=== Tackles ===
- Mike Pearson, Florida (AP-1, Coaches-1)
- Terrence Metcalf, Ole Miss (AP-1, Coaches-1)
- Jon Stinchcomb, Georgia (AP-1, Coaches-2)
- Melvin Paige, South Carolina (AP-2, Coaches-2)
- Shawn Andrews, Arkansas (AP-2)
- Pat Green, Vanderbilt (Coaches-2)
- Jason Baggett, LSU (Coaches-2)

=== Tight ends ===
- Randy McMichael, Georgia (AP-1, Coaches-1)
- Robert Royal, LSU (AP-2)
- Doug Zeigler, Ole Miss (AP-2)
- Terry Jones, Alabama (Coaches-2)

== Defensive selections ==
=== Defensive ends ===
- Alex Brown, Florida (AP-1, Coaches-1)
- Will Overstreet, Tennessee (AP-2, Coaches-1)
- Dennis Johnson, Kentucky (AP-1)
- Charles Grant, Georgia (AP-2, Coaches-2)
- Carlos Hall, Arkansas (AP-2)
- Jarvis Green, LSU (Coaches-2)

=== Defensive tackles ===
- John Henderson, Tennessee (AP-1, Coaches-1)
- Jarrett Johnson, Alabama (AP-1)
- Albert Haynesworth, Tennessee (AP-2)
- Ian Scott, Florida (AP-2)
- Kenny King, Alabama (Coaches-2)
- Kindal Moorehead, Alabama (Coaches-2)

=== Linebackers ===
- Kalimba Edwards#, South Carolina (AP-1, Coaches-1)
- Trev Faulk, LSU (AP-1, Coaches-1)
- Andra Davis, Florida (AP-1, Coaches-2)
- Saleem Rasheed, Alabama (AP-2, Coaches-1)
- Jermaine Petty, Arkansas (AP-1)
- Bradie James, LSU (Coaches-1)
- Tony Bua, Arkansas (AP-2)
- Mario Haggan, Miss. St (AP-2)
- Boss Bailey, Georgia (Coaches-2)
- Eddie Strong, Ole Miss (Coaches-2)
- Dontarrious Thomas, Auburn (Coaches-2)

=== Cornerbacks ===
- Lito Sheppard, Florida (AP-1, Coaches-1)
- Tim Wansley, Georgia (AP-1, Coaches-1)
- Syniker Taylor, Ole Miss (AP-2, Coaches-1)
- Sheldon Brown, South Carolina (AP-2, Coaches-1)

=== Safeties ===
- Pig Prather, Miss. St. (AP-1, Coaches-2)
- Todd Johnson, Florida (AP-1, Coaches-2)
- Ken Hamlin, Arkansas (AP-1)
- Andre Lott, Tennessee (Coaches-1)
- Rashad Faison, South Carolina (AP-2)
- Josh Morgan, Miss. St. (AP-2)

== Special teams ==
=== Kickers ===
- Jeff Chandler, Florida (AP-1, Coaches-2)
- Damon Duval, Auburn (AP-2, Coaches-1)

=== Punters ===
- Glenn Pakulak, Kentucky (AP-1, Coaches-2)
- Damon Duval, Auburn (AP-2, Coaches-1)

=== All purpose/return specialist ===
- Derek Abney, Kentucky (AP-1)
- Domanick Davis, LSU (AP-2)

== Key ==
Bold = Consensus first-team selection by both the coaches and AP

AP = Associated Press.

Coaches = Selected by the SEC coaches

* = unanimous selection of AP

# = unanimous selection of the coaches

† = Unanimous selection of both AP and Coaches

== See also ==
- 2001 College Football All-America Team
