= Alonzo Ephraim =

American football player (born 1981)

No. 50, 76, 63, 58
- Position: Center

Personal information
- Born: November 8, 1981 (age 44); Birmingham, Alabama, U.S.
- Listed height: 6 ft 4 in (1.93 m)
- Listed weight: 312 lb (142 kg)

Career information
- High school: Wenonah (Birmingham)
- College: Alabama
- NFL draft: 2003: undrafted

Career history
- Philadelphia Eagles (2003–2004); Miami Dolphins (2005); Cleveland Browns (2006); New York Dragons (2007–2008); Team Alabama (2008)*
- * Offseason or practice squad member only

Awards and highlights
- Second-team All-American (2002); 2× First-team All-SEC (2001, 2002)

Career NFL statistics
- Games played: 43
- Games started: 5
- Stats at Pro Football Reference

Career AFL statistics
- Total tackles: 2
- Stats at ArenaFan.com

Alonzo Brandon Ephraim (born November 8, 1981) is an American former professional football player who was an offensive lineman in the National Football League (NFL). He played college football for the Alabama Crimson Tide.

Ephraim was originally signed as an undrafted free agent by the Philadelphia Eagles in 2003. In 2006, while with the Cleveland Browns, he was suspended four games for violating the league's substance-abuse policy, after which he was waived by the Browns.

On July 27, 2007, Ephraim signed with the All American Football League to play for Team Alabama when the league began play.

== Early life ==
Ephraim attended Wenonah High School, where he played center on offense and defensive end on defense. He was also the starting center on the school's basketball team. He was on the baseball and track teams as well. In 1998, as a senior he was selected as the Class 6A Offensive Lineman of the Year. He was a Super 12 (All-State) team Honorable Mention, along with future college teammates Dante Ellington and Saleem Rasheed. When he graduated he had a 3.2 GPA.

== College career ==
Ephraim received interest from schools such as Alabama, Michigan, UCLA, Notre Dame, Georgia Tech, Nebraska. In the end, he chose Alabama. As a true freshman, he appeared in just two games, for a total of 29 plays. He then played as a back-up for every game as a sophomore. He became a starter as a junior, and had 708 plays that season, the most among Alabama offensive linemen. He also recorded 118 knock-down blocks. He was a second-team All-America selection his senior year. He was also an All-SEC selection as a junior. As a senior, he was one of seven Alabama players selected as All-SEC. As a senior, he was named to the Rimington Trophy watchlist.

== Professional career ==
=== Philadelphia Eagles ===
Ephraim went unselected in the 2003 NFL draft. However, he signed as an undrafted free agent with the Philadelphia Eagles and played in 16 games as a rookie. In 2004, he played in 13 games with two starts at right guard for the Eagles. He was released on April 28, 2005.

=== Miami Dolphins ===
On August 2, 2005, he signed with the Miami Dolphins. In his lone season with the Dolphins, he played in 13 games, with three starts.

=== Cleveland Browns ===
In 2006, he signed as an unrestricted free agent with the Cleveland Browns but was suspended for four games for violating the league's substance-abuse policy. He was waived after he completed his suspension. Over his four-year NFL career, he played in a total of 43 games.

=== New York Dragons ===
On April 24, 2008, Ephraim signed with the New York Dragons of the Arena Football League and played in three games as a rookie.

=== All American Football League ===
At the All American Football League's national try-outs held on July 27, 2007, Ephraim, along with fellow Alabama alumni Reggie Myles and Marcus Spencer, signed with the league to play for Team Alabama. However, the league postponed their inaugural season until 2009.

== See also ==
- List of Philadelphia Eagles players
- List of Miami Dolphins players
- List of Arena Football League and National Football League players
