= Tony Bua =

American gridiron football player (born 1980)

No. 51, 7
- Position: Linebacker

Personal information
- Born: February 11, 1980 (age 46); New Orleans, Louisiana, U.S.
- Listed height: 5 ft 11 in (1.80 m)
- Listed weight: 180 lb (82 kg)

Career information
- High school: River Ridge (LA) Curtis Christian
- College: Arkansas
- NFL draft: 2004: 5th round, 160th overall pick

Career history
- Miami Dolphins (2004); Dallas Cowboys (2005)*; Cincinnati Bengals (2005–2006)*; Calgary Stampeders (2007); Team Arkansas (2008)*
- * Offseason or practice squad member only

Awards and highlights
- First-team All-SEC (2003); 2× Second-team All-SEC (2001, 2002)
- Stats at Pro Football Reference

Tony Bua (born February 11, 1980) is an American former professional football player who was a linebacker in the National Football League (NFL). He played college football for the Arkansas Razorbacks. His hometown is Liberty, Texas.

== College career ==
Bua had a distinguished college career as a linebacker/safety while playing at the University of Arkansas, and entered the draft with Mark Bloom as his agent. Although Bua was selected as a linebacker, he mainly was used to play on special teams, primarily during punting situations.

== Professional career ==
=== NFL ===
Bua was drafted in the 5th round of the 2004 NFL draft by the Miami Dolphins. During preseason workouts, Bua was praised by Dolphins head coach Dave Wannstedt for his work ethic and performance, and was stated to have a chance to make the roster. During the season, Bua missed a 4-week stretch in the early part of the season due to a hamstring injury, and then on Week 11 during a game with the Seattle Seahawks, he injured his quadriceps and was placed on the injured reserve. He played a total of seven regular season games for the Dolphins.

While Bua was moved to safety to begin the 2005 season, the Dolphins waived him on September 4. He was then signed to the Dallas Cowboys's practice squad but was waived on October 19. He was then signed by the Cincinnati Bengals, but on August 20, 2006, he again was waived. Bua reportedly worked out with the Minnesota Vikings, but was never signed.

=== CFL ===
Bua played four games for the Calgary Stampeders, but was released during the season.

=== AAFL ===
Bua signed to play in the AAFL in its inaugural season, for Team Arkansas.
