= Bradie James =

American football player (born 1981)

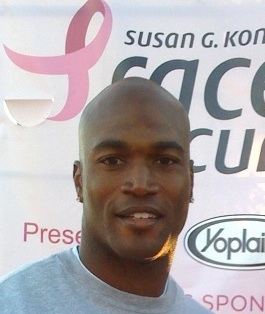
- James at the Komen Race for the Cure in 2009

No. 56, 53
- Position: Linebacker

Personal information
- Born: January 17, 1981 (age 45); Monroe, Louisiana, U.S.
- Listed height: 6 ft 2 in (1.88 m)
- Listed weight: 240 lb (109 kg)

Career information
- High school: West Monroe (West Monroe, Louisiana)
- College: LSU
- NFL draft: 2003: 4th round, 103rd overall pick

Career history
- Dallas Cowboys (2003–2011); Houston Texans (2012)

Awards and highlights
- First-team All-American (2002); 2× First-team All-SEC (2001, 2002)

Career NFL statistics
- Total tackles: 834
- Sacks: 16
- Forced fumbles: 10
- Fumble recoveries: 14
- Interceptions: 2
- Defensive touchdowns: 1
- Stats at Pro Football Reference

Bradie Gene James (born January 17, 1981) is an American former professional football player who was a linebacker in the National Football League (NFL) for the Dallas Cowboys and Houston Texans. He played college football for the LSU Tigers.

== Early life ==
James went to Wossman High School in Monroe, Louisiana, from 1995 to 1997. In 1998, he transferred to West Monroe High School in West Monroe, Louisiana, where he played under legendary coach Don Shows.

During his senior year, James posted 136 tackles (10 for loss), five sacks and three fumble recoveries, while helping his team win the 1998 Class 5A state title. He also earned Parade All-American, All-State, Football Magazine's All-Louisiana Team, class 5A defensive MVP and district defensive MVP honors.

== College career ==
In 1999, James accepted a scholarship from Louisiana State University (LSU) to play college football for LSU's football team. He became the second player in LSU history to register more than 400 career tackles (behind Al Richardson), finishing with 418 tackles, including 33 for a loss, 29 quarterback pressures, 14 sacks, eight pass deflections, four forced fumbles, two fumble recoveries and two interceptions.

As a freshman (1999), he was named the starter at weakside linebacker, posting 41 tackles, three sacks, and one interception. The following year, he recorded 110 tackles (second on the team), five sacks (led the team) and was named the Defensive MVP of the 2000 Peach Bowl.

During his junior year, LSU's defense was dubbed "the James Gang defense", a term applied to the unit largely because of his leadership. That year, he had 113 tackles (second on the team) and three sacks.

In his final season at LSU, James was the team captain of the defense and was moved to middle linebacker, recording 154 tackles (an LSU single season record), three sacks, and one interception. He also was the first Tiger linebacker to achieve All-SEC honors two years in a row since Warren Capone was (All-SEC in 1972 and 1973). James was named a National Scholar Athlete and a member of the SEC Academic Honor Roll. He finished second on the school's all-time career tackle list with 418 tackles. James also posted 14 sacks, 33 tackles for loss, 29 quarterback pressures, eight passes defensed, four forced fumbles, two fumble recoveries and two interceptions.

== Professional career ==
Pre-draft measurables
Height	Weight	Arm length	Hand span	20-yard shuttle	Three-cone drill	Vertical jump	Broad jump
6 ft 2 3/8 in (1.89 m)	242 lb (110 kg)	32 1/4 in (0.82 m)	9 1/2 in (0.24 m)	4.54 s	7.53 s	32.5 in (0.83 m)	9 ft 5 in (2.87 m)
All values from NFL Combine

=== Dallas Cowboys ===
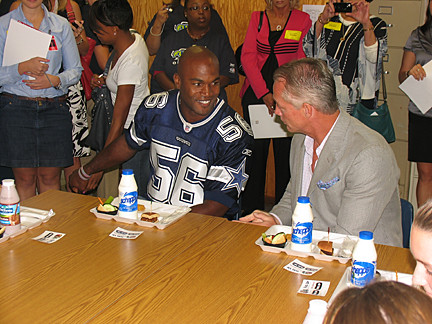
James and Daryl Johnston in 2010

James was selected in the fourth round (103rd overall) of the 2003 NFL draft by the Dallas Cowboys. He was the sixth middle/inside linebacker taken, behind Nick Barnett of Oregon State, Kawika Mitchell of South Florida, Gerald Hayes of Pittsburgh, Cie Grant of Ohio State, and Angelo Crowell of Virginia.

He backed up Pro Bowl outside linebacker Dexter Coakley in a 4–3 defense during his first two seasons in the league, while showing playmaking ability as a special teams performer. In 2003, he was fourth on the team with 16 special teams tackles and the next year he led the team with 24.

In 2005, the Cowboys changed to a 3–4 defense, allowing him to have a breakout year, while making the transition from special teams player to starting middle linebacker to lead the Cowboys with 109 tackles. he led the team in combined tackles the following 2 years as well.

James was the first player to lead the Cowboys in tackles for more than three straight seasons, eventually reaching a total of six consecutive years, the longest streak in franchise history. He also had a streak of five straight seasons with at least 100 tackles, that ended after the 2010 season.

James only missed two games in his Cowboys career (because he was deactivated as a rookie) and dealt each season, with the uncertainty of who would start at the other inside linebacker position, having to play with different teammates who included: Scott Shanle, Akin Ayodele, Zach Thomas, Keith Brooking and Sean Lee.

In 2011, with the emergence of Lee, James and Brooking split snaps at the other inside linebacker spot. At the end of the season, the club decided not to re-sign him, with James leaving as its sixth career leading tackler.

=== Houston Texans ===
After the Houston Texans traded DeMeco Ryans to the Philadelphia Eagles, they signed James to a one-year contract on April 12, 2012, reuniting with defensive coordinator Wade Phillips, who was his head coach with the Dallas Cowboys. He started 15 games (missing one with a hamstring injury), finished third on the team in tackles (77) and called all of the defense's signals/audibles. He wasn't re-signed after his contract expired at the end of the year.

After being out of football for a year, on May 6, 2014, he signed a one-day contract to retire with the Dallas Cowboys.

== NFL career statistics ==
Legend
**Bold**	Career high

=== Regular season ===
Year	Team	Games		Tackles					Interceptions					Fumbles			
Year	Team	GP	GS	Cmb	Solo	Ast	Sck	TFL	Int	Yds	TD	Lng	PD	FF	FR	Yds	TD
2003	DAL	14	0	14	12	2	0.0	0	0	0	0	0	0	1	1	0	0
2004	DAL	**16**	2	54	40	14	0.0	1	0	0	0	0	2	0	0	0	0
2005	DAL	**16**	**16**	93	73	20	2.5	4	0	0	0	0	4	0	0	0	0
2006	DAL	**16**	**16**	103	66	**37**	0.0	2	**1**	**15**	**1**	**15**	**9**	2	2	0	0
2007	DAL	**16**	**16**	101	64	**37**	3.0	5	0	0	0	0	0	0	**3**	**1**	0
2008	DAL	**16**	**16**	117	**81**	36	**8.0**	**15**	0	0	0	0	4	**3**	2	0	0
2009	DAL	**16**	**16**	113	80	33	2.0	6	0	0	0	0	5	1	1	0	0
2010	DAL	**16**	**16**	**118**	**81**	**37**	0.0	4	**1**	11	0	11	3	2	2	0	0
2011	DAL	**16**	13	44	29	15	0.0	0	0	0	0	0	1	1	1	0	0
2012	HOU	15	15	77	46	31	0.5	3	0	0	0	0	2	0	2	0	0
		157	126	834	572	262	16.0	40	2	26	1	15	30	10	14	1	0

=== Playoffs ===
Year	Team	Games		Tackles					Interceptions					Fumbles			
Year	Team	GP	GS	Cmb	Solo	Ast	Sck	TFL	Int	Yds	TD	Lng	PD	FF	FR	Yds	TD
2003	DAL	1	0	0	0	0	0.0	0	0	0	0	0	0	0	0	0	0
2006	DAL	1	1	11	8	3	0.0	0	0	0	0	0	0	0	0	0	0
2007	DAL	1	1	4	2	2	0.0	0	0	0	0	0	0	0	0	0	0
2009	DAL	**2**	**2**	11	**10**	1	**1.0**	**3**	0	0	0	0	**1**	**1**	**2**	0	0
2012	HOU	**2**	**2**	**15**	6	**9**	0.0	2	0	0	0	0	0	0	0	0	0
		7	6	41	26	15	1.0	5	0	0	0	0	1	1	2	0	0

== Personal life ==
In 2006, James was the co-host of Inside The Huddle, a one-hour player commentary show that aired live on sports talk radio in Dallas along with quarterback Tony Romo. He is a member of Omega Psi Phi fraternity. He was married on May 30, 2009.

=== Foundation 56 ===
James established Foundation 56 as a breast cancer outreach program dedicated to providing access to quality services and resources for breast cancer patients and survivors.

Foundation 56 is a tribute to Bradie's mother Etta, who died from the disease in 2001. Bradie often says if there had been the types of services offered because of Foundation 56 his mother would still be alive.

The Foundation supports education, mammogram screenings, diagnostic testing and social therapy programs. Twice a year, the Foundation awards grants to organizations committed to effectively promoting awareness of services and resources to breast cancer patients and survivors. He is a devout Christian.
