= 1999 All-SEC football team =

American college football all-star team

The 1999 All-SEC football team consists of American football players selected to the All-Southeastern Conference (SEC) chosen by the Associated Press (AP) and the conference coaches for the 1999 NCAA Division I-A football season.

The Alabama Crimson Tide won the conference, beating the Florida Gators 34 to 7 in the SEC Championship game.

Alabama running back Shaun Alexander was unanimously voted the coaches SEC Player of the Year and was selected as the AP SEC Offensive Player of the Year. Tennessee safety Deon Grant was voted the AP SEC Defensive Player of the Year.

== Offensive selections ==
=== Quarterbacks ===
- Tee Martin, Tennessee (AP-1, Coaches-1)
- Clint Stoerner, Arkansas (AP-2, Coaches-2)
- Quincy Carter, Georgia (AP-2)

=== Running backs ===
- Shaun Alexander, Alabama (AP-1, Coaches-1)
- Deuce McAllister, Ole Miss (AP-1, Coaches-1)
- Joe Gunn, Ole Miss (AP-2, Coaches-2)
- Jamal Lewis, Tennessee (AP-2, Coaches-2)

=== Wide receivers ===
- Darrell Jackson, Florida (AP-1, Coaches-1)
- Anthony Lucas, Arkansas (AP-1, Coaches-2)
- Freddie Milons, Alabama (Coaches-1)
- Ronney Daniels, Auburn (AP-2, Coaches-2)
- Cory Peterson, Ole Miss (AP-2)
- Cedrick Wilson Sr., Tennessee (AP-2)

=== Centers ===
- Miles Luckie, Georgia (AP-1, Coaches-2)
- Paul Hogan, Alabama (AP-2, Coaches-1)
- Jeff Barnett, Vanderbilt (AP-1)

=== Guards ===
- Cosey Coleman, Tennessee (AP-1, Coaches-1)
- Cooper Carlisle, Florida (AP-2, Coaches-1)
- Steve Herndon, Georgia (AP-1)
- Cheston Blackshear, Florida (AP-2, Coaches-2)
- Wes Shivers, Miss. St. (AP-2)
- Bobbie Williams, Arkansas (Coaches-2)
- Tutan Reyes, Ole Miss (Coaches-2)

=== Tackles ===
- Chris Samuels, Alabama (AP-1, Coaches-1)
- Todd Wade, Ole Miss (AP-1, Coaches-1)
- Kenyatta Walker, Florida (AP-2, Coaches-2)
- Jeno James, Auburn (Coaches-2)
- Chad Clifton, Tennessee (Coaches-2)

=== Tight ends ===
- James Whalen, Kentucky (AP-1, Coaches-1)
- Joe Dean Davenport, Arkansas (AP-2, Coaches-2)
- Elliott Carson, Vanderbilt (AP-2, Coaches-2)

== Defensive selections ==
=== Defensive ends ===
- Alex Brown, Florida (AP-1, Coaches-1)
- Shaun Ellis, Tennessee (AP-1, Coaches-1)
- Dennis Johnson, Kentucky (AP-2)
- Kenny Smith, Alabama (AP-2)

=== Defensive tackles ===
- Darwin Walker, Tennessee (AP-1, Coaches-1)
- Richard Seymour, Georgia (AP-1)
- Gerard Warren, Florida (AP-2, Coaches-2)
- Kindal Moorehead, Alabama (AP-2)
- Kendrick Clancy, Ole Miss (AP-2)

=== Linebackers ===
- Jamie Winborn, Vanderbilt (AP-1, Coaches-1)
- Raynoch Thompson, Tennessee (AP-1, Coaches-1)
- Barrin Simpson, Miss. St. (AP-1, Coaches-1)
- Jeff Snedegar, Kentucky (Coaches-1)
- John Abraham, South Carolina (AP-2, Coaches-2)
- Kendrell Bell, Georgia (AP-2, Coaches-2)
- Orantes Grant, Georgia (AP-2, Coaches-2)
- Armegis Spearman, Ole Miss (AP-2)
- Eddie Strong, Ole Miss (Coaches-2)

=== Cornerbacks ===
- Robert Bean, Miss. St. (AP-1, Coaches-2)
- Fred Smoot, Miss. St. (AP-1, Coaches-2)
- Dwayne Goodrich, Tennessee (AP-2, Coaches-1)
- Larry Casher, Auburn (AP-1)
- David Barrett, Arkansas (AP-2, Coaches-2)

=== Safeties ===
- Deon Grant, Tennessee (AP-1, Coaches-1)
- Ashley Cooper, Miss. St. (AP-1, Coaches-1)
- Kenoy Kennedy, Arkansas (AP-2, Coaches-1)
- Ainsley Battles, Vanderbilt (AP-2, Coaches-2)
- Anthony Wajda, Kentucky (Coaches-2)

== Special teams ==
=== Kickers ===
- Jeff Chandler, Florida (AP-1, Coaches-1)
- Scott Westerfield, Miss. St. (AP-2, Coaches-2)
- Les Binkley, Ole Miss (AP-2)

=== Punters ===
- Andy Smith, Kentucky (AP-1, Coaches-1)
- Jeff Walker, Miss. St. (AP-2, Coaches-2)
- Corey Gibbs, LSU (AP-2)

=== All purpose/return specialist ===
- Bo Carroll, Florida (AP-1)
- Deuce McAllister, Ole Miss (AP-2)

== Key ==
AP = Associated Press.

Coaches = selected by the SEC coaches

== See also ==
- 1999 College Football All-America Team
