= Chris Thurmond =

American football coach

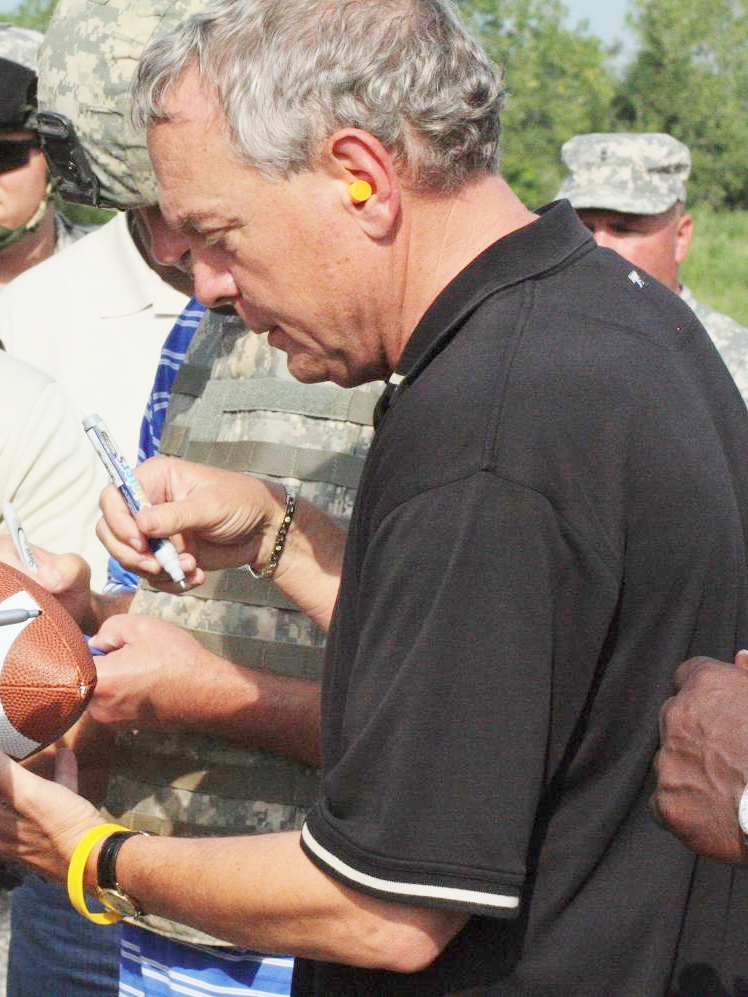
- Thurmond signs an autograph for Kentucky Army National Guard servicemembers in 2010.

Current position
- Title: Offensive analyst
- Team: Oklahoma State
- Conference: Big 12

Biographical details
- Born: February 25, 1953 (age 73); Tulsa, Oklahoma, U.S
- Education: Tulsa

Coaching career (HC unless noted)
- 1975–1976: McAlester HS (OK) (DB)
- 1977–1979: Charles Page HS (OK) (DB)
- 1980: Claremore (HS (OK) (DC)
- 1981–1982: Charles Page HS (OK)
- 1983–1991: Tulsa (DB)
- 1992–1993: East Carolina (DC/DB)
- 1994: Tulsa (DB)
- 1995: TCU (DB)
- 1996–1997: Oklahoma (DB)
- 1998–2000: TCU (DB)
- 2001–2002: Alabama (CB)
- 2003–2005: Texas A&M (CB)
- 2006–2007: Houston (CB/RC)
- 2007: Houston (interim HC)
- 2008–2010: Kentucky (DB)
- 2011: Rice (CB)
- 2012–2016: Rice (DC/CB)
- 2018–present: Oklahoma State (offensive analyst)

Head coaching record
- Overall: 0–1
- Bowls: 0–1

David Christopher Thurmond (born February 25, 1953) is an American football coach. He is an offensive analyst at Oklahoma State University, a position he has held since 2017. Thurmond served as the interim head football coach at the University of Houston for the final game of the 2007 season, the 2007 Texas Bowl.

== Early life ==
Born in Tulsa, Oklahoma, Thurmond grew up in Sand Springs, Oklahoma. Thurmond was a quarterback on the Charles Page High School football team and graduated in 1971. Thurmond then earned a bachelor's degree in education from the University of Tulsa in 1975.

== Coaching career ==
From 1975 to 1976, Thurmond was defensive backs coach at McAlester High School in McAlester, Oklahoma. He returned to his alma mater Charles Page High School to be defensive backs coach from 1977 to 1979. In 1980, Thurmond was defensive coordinator at Claremore High School in Claremore, Oklahoma before returning to Page to be head coach 1983.

Moving to the college ranks, from 1983 to 1991, Thurmond coached cornerbacks and defensive backs at Tulsa. During this period, Tulsa had four different head coaches: John Cooper (1983–1984), Don Morton (1985–1986), George Henshaw (1987), and David Rader (1988–1991). Tulsa appeared in the 1989 Independence Bowl and won the 1991 Freedom Bowl. Thurmond then became the defensive backs coach at East Carolina from 1992 to 1993, Tulsa in 1994, TCU in 1995, Oklahoma from 1996 to 1997, and again at TCU from 1998 to 2000. In Thurmond's second stint at TCU, TCU won the 1998 Sun Bowl and 1999 Mobile Alabama Bowl and lost the 2000 Mobile Alabama Bowl.

Thurmond was cornerbacks coach at Alabama from 2001 to 2002 under Dennis Franchione; Alabama won the 2001 Independence Bowl. Thurmond then followed Franchione to Texas A&M in 2003 and was cornerbacks coach there until 2005. From 2006 to 2007, Thurmond was cornerbacks coach and recruiting coordinator at Houston under Art Briles. After Briles resigned to accept the head coaching job at Baylor, Thurmond served as Houston interim head coach for the 2007 Texas Bowl; Houston lost to TCU.

From 2008 to 2010, Thurmond was defensive backs coach at Kentucky, under Rich Brooks from 2008 to 2009 then Joker Phillips in 2010. Thurmond's tenure at Kentucky included a win in the 2009 Liberty Bowl following the 2008 season. In 2011, Thurmond joined David Bailiff's staff at Rice to be cornerbacks coach; Thurmond added defensive coordinator to his duties in 2012. Rice won the 2012 Armed Forces Bowl in Thurmond's first season as defensive coordinator.

== Head coaching record ==
Year	Team	Overall	Conference	Standing	Bowl/playoffs
Houston Cougars (Conference USA) (2007)
2007	Houston (Note: After Art Briles resigned, Thurmond was named interim head coach on November 28 and coached the team in the Texas Bowl.)	0–1			L Texas
Houston:		0–1			
Total:		0–1			
