= Boss Bailey =

American football player (born 1979)

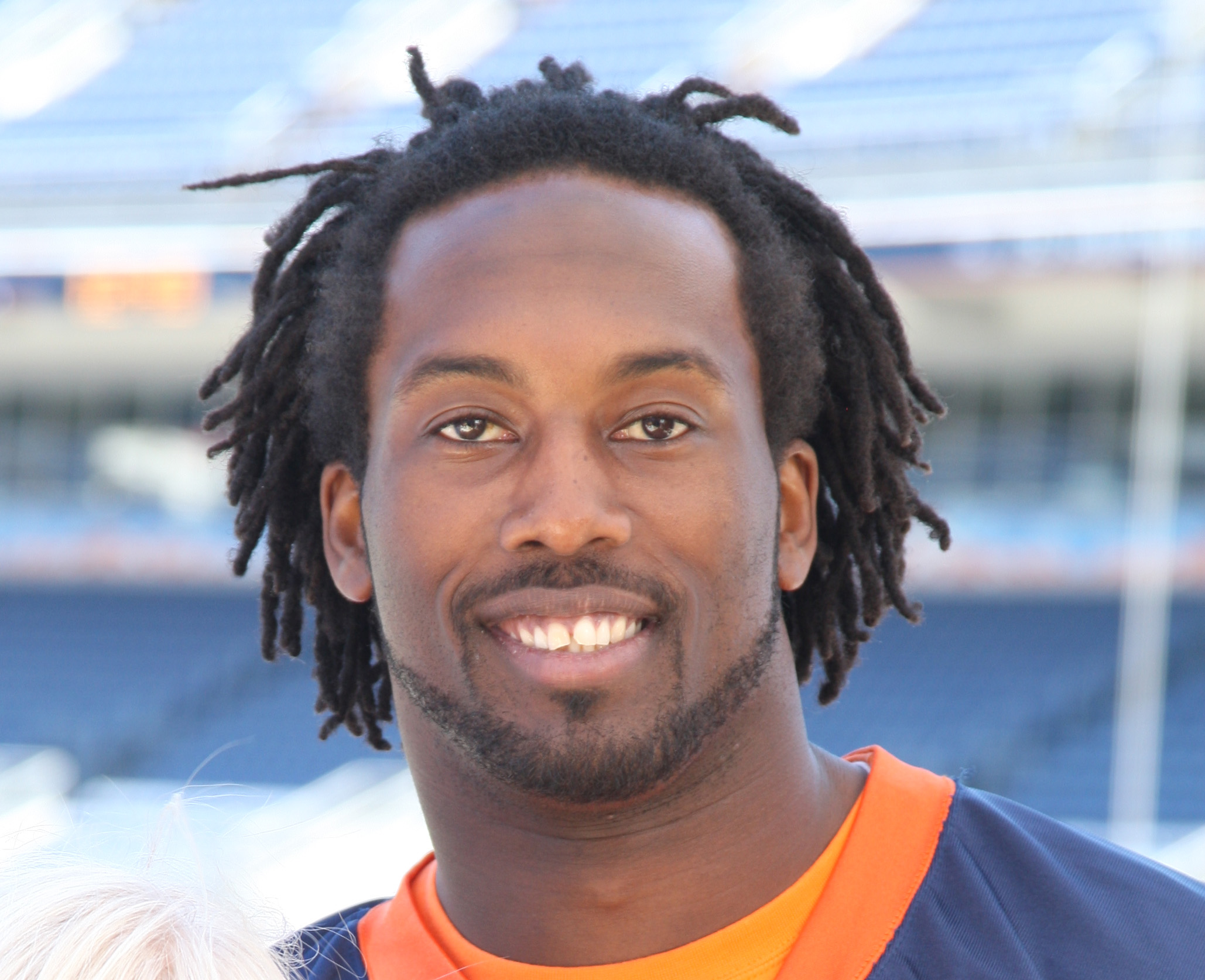
- Bailey with the Denver Broncos in 2008

No. 97
- Position: Linebacker

Personal information
- Born: October 14, 1979 (age 47); Folkston, Georgia, U.S.
- Listed height: 6 ft 3 in (1.91 m)
- Listed weight: 232 lb (105 kg)

Career information
- High school: Charlton County (Folkston, Georgia)
- College: Georgia
- NFL draft: 2003: 2nd round, 34th overall pick

Career history
- Detroit Lions (2003–2007); Denver Broncos (2008–2009)

Awards and highlights
- First-team All-American (2002); First-team All-SEC (2002); Second-team All-SEC (2001)

Career NFL statistics
- Total tackles: 305
- Sacks: 7
- Forced fumbles: 2
- Fumble recoveries: 2
- Interceptions: 2
- Defensive touchdowns: 2
- Stats at Pro Football Reference

Rodney "Boss" Bailey (born October 14, 1979) is an American former professional football player who was a linebacker in the National Football League (NFL). He was originally selected by the Detroit Lions in the second round of the 2003 NFL draft. He played college football at the University of Georgia. He is the brother of Hall of Fame NFL cornerback Champ Bailey.

== Early life ==
Bailey was born in Folkston, Georgia. He received honorable mention All-America honors from USA Today at Charlton County High School in Folkston Georgia.

== College career ==
Bailey was a three-year starter at Georgia. As a senior, he was a first-team All-SEC selection as well as a semifinalist for the Butkus and Lombardi Awards.

== Professional career ==
Pre-draft measurables
Height	Weight	Arm length	Hand span	40-yard dash	Vertical jump	Broad jump
6 ft 3 1/8 in (1.91 m)	233 lb (106 kg)	32 1/2 in (0.83 m)	9 3/4 in (0.25 m)	4.58 s	42.0 in (1.07 m)	11 ft 3 in (3.43 m)
All values from NFL Combine

Bailey appeared in 58 career games (51 starts), posting 265 tackles (204 solo), seven sacks (40.5 yds.) and two interceptions (32 yds.). He also registered 13 pass breakups, one forced fumble, one fumble recovery and seven special-teams tackles for his career.

=== Detroit Lions ===
He was named All-Rookie by ESPN.com and Football Digest with Detroit in 2003 when he set a career-high with 88 tackles (77 solo) as a 16-game starter. After missing the 2004 season with a knee injury, Bailey started all 11 games played in 2005 and had 58 tackles, one sack and one interception, which he returned 34 yards for a touchdown. He started eight games at strongside linebacker and four contests at middle linebacker for the Lions in 2006, appearing in all 16 games and totaling 67 tackles (51 solo) with one sack that year. In 2007, Bailey posted a career-high 3.5 sacks (16.0 yds.) while adding 51 tackles (37 solo), two pass breakups and one forced fumble in 15 games (12 starts) at strongside linebacker for Detroit.

=== Denver Broncos ===
On March 6, 2008, Boss signed a five-year contract worth $17.5 million that included $8 million in guarantees over the first two seasons. Bailey was released on June 17, 2009.

== NFL career statistics ==
Year	Team	GP	Tackles				Fumbles			Interceptions					
Year	Team	GP	Comb	Solo	Ast	Sck	FF	FR	Yds	Int	Yds	Avg	Lng	TD	PD
2003	DET	16	88	68	20	1.5	0	1	0	1	-2	-2	-2	0	6
2005	DET	11	59	39	20	1.0	0	0	0	1	34	34	34	1	3
2006	DET	16	67	51	16	1.0	0	0	0	0	0	0	0	0	2
2007	DET	15	51	37	14	3.5	1	0	0	0	0	0	0	0	2
2008	DEN	6	40	31	9	0.0	1	1	0	0	0	0	0	0	0
Career		64	305	226	79	7.0	2	2	0	2	32	16	34	1	13
