= 2002 All-SEC football team =

American college football all-star team

The 2002 All-SEC football team consists of American football players selected to the All-Southeastern Conference (SEC) chosen by the Associated Press (AP) and the conference coaches for the 2002 NCAA Division I-A football season.

The Georgia Bulldogs won the conference, beating the Arkansas Razorbacks 30 to 3 in the SEC Championship game. The Bulldogs went on to defeat the Florida State Seminoles 26 to 13 in the Sugar Bowl.

Georgia defensive end David Pollack was voted both the coaches SEC Player of the Year and AP SEC Defensive Player of the Year. Kentucky running back Artose Pinner was voted the AP SEC Offensive Player of the Year.

== Offensive selections ==
=== Quarterbacks ===
- David Greene, Georgia (AP-1, Coaches-1)
- Jared Lorenzen, Kentucky (AP-2, Coaches-2)
- Eli Manning, Ole Miss (AP-2)
- Rex Grossman, Florida (Coaches-2)

=== Running backs ===
- Artose Pinner, Kentucky (AP-1, Coaches-1)
- Musa Smith, Georgia (AP-1, Coaches-2)
- Fred Talley, Arkansas (AP-2, Coaches-1)
- Ronnie Brown, Auburn (AP-2, Coaches-2)
- Domanick Davis, LSU (Coaches-2)

=== Wide receivers ===
- Taylor Jacobs, Florida (AP-1, Coaches-1)
- Terrence Edwards, Georgia (AP-1, Coaches-1)
- Michael Clayton, LSU (AP-2, Coaches-2)
- Chris Collins, Ole Miss (AP-2)
- Dan Stricker, Vanderbilt (Coaches-2)

=== Centers ===
- Ben Nowland, Auburn (AP-1, Coaches-1)
- Alonzo Ephraim, Alabama (AP-1)
- Ben Claxton, Ole Miss (AP-2, Coaches-2)

=== Guards ===
- Marico Portis, Alabama (AP-2, Coaches-1)
- Stephen Peterman, (Coaches-1)
- Justin Smiley, Alabama (AP-2, Coaches-2)
- Kevin Breedlove, Georgia (AP-2, Coaches-2)
- Shannon Snell, Florida (Coaches-2)

=== Tackles ===
- Shawn Andrews, Arkansas (AP-1, Coaches-1)
- Wesley Britt, Alabama (AP-1, Coaches-1)
- Jon Stinchcomb, Georgia (AP-1, Coaches-1)
- Will Ofenheusle, Tennessee (AP-1, Coaches-2)
- Antonio Hall, Kentucky (AP-2, Coaches-1)

=== Tight ends ===
- Jason Witten, Tennessee (AP-1, Coaches-1)
- Aaron Walker, Florida (AP-2, Coaches-2)

== Defensive selections ==
=== Defensive linemen ===
- David Pollack, Georgia (AP-1, Coaches-1)
- Kindal Moorehead, Alabama (AP-1, Coaches-1)
- Jarrett Johnson, Alabama (AP-1, Coaches-2)
- Johnathan Sullivan, Georgia (AP-1, Coaches-2)
- Kenny King, Alabama (Coaches-1)
- Dewayne Robertson, Kentucky (AP-2, Coaches-2)
- Chad Lavalais, LSU (AP-2)
- Vincent Burns, Kentucky (AP-2)
- Jason Clark, Miss. St. (AP-2)
- Langston Moore, South Carolina (Coaches-2)

=== Linebackers ===
- Bradie James, LSU (AP-1, Coaches-1)
- Boss Bailey, Georgia (AP-1, Coaches-1)
- Karlos Dansby, Auburn (AP-1, Coaches-1)
- Hunter Hillenmeyer, Vanderbilt (AP-2, Coaches-1)
- Eddie Strong, Ole Miss (Coaches-1)
- Mario Haggan, Miss. St (AP-2, Coaches-2)
- Tony Bua, Arkansas (AP-2, Coaches-2)
- Byron Hardman, Florida (AP-2)
- Brooks Daniels, Alabama (AP-2)
- Eddie Moore, Tennessee (Coaches-2)
- Mark Brown, Auburn (Coaches-2)

=== Defensive backs ===
- Corey Webster, LSU (AP-1, Coaches-1)
- Ken Hamlin, Arkansas (AP-1, Coaches-1)
- Travaris Robinson, Auburn (AP-1, Coaches-1)
- Keiwan Ratliff, Florida (AP-1, Coaches-2)
- Matt Grier, Ole Miss (AP-2, Coaches-1)
- Julian Battle, Tennessee (AP-2, Coaches-1)
- Rashad Baker, Tennessee (AP-2, Coaches-1)
- Todd Johnson, Florida (AP-2, Coaches-2)
- Demetrius Hookfin, LSU (AP-2)
- Kentrell Curry, Georgia (Coaches-2)
- Ahmad Carroll, Arkansas (Coaches-2)
- Gerald Dixon, Alabama (Coaches-2)
- Guss Scott, Florida (Coaches-2)

== Special teams ==
=== Kickers ===
- Billy Bennett, Georgia (AP-1, Coaches-1)
- Brent Smith, Miss. St. (AP-2)
- John Corbello, LSU (Coaches-2)

=== Punters ===
- Glenn Pakulak, Kentucky (AP-1, Coaches-1)
- Damon Duval, Auburn (AP-2)
- Donnie Jones, LSU (Coaches-2)

=== All purpose/return specialist ===
- Derek Abney, Kentucky (AP-1, Coaches-1)
- Domanick Williams, LSU (AP-2, Coaches-2)

== Key ==
Bold = Consensus first-team selection by both the coaches and AP

AP = Associated Press.

Coaches = Selected by the SEC coaches

== See also ==
- 2002 College Football All-America Team
