= Mario Haggan =

American football player (born 1980)

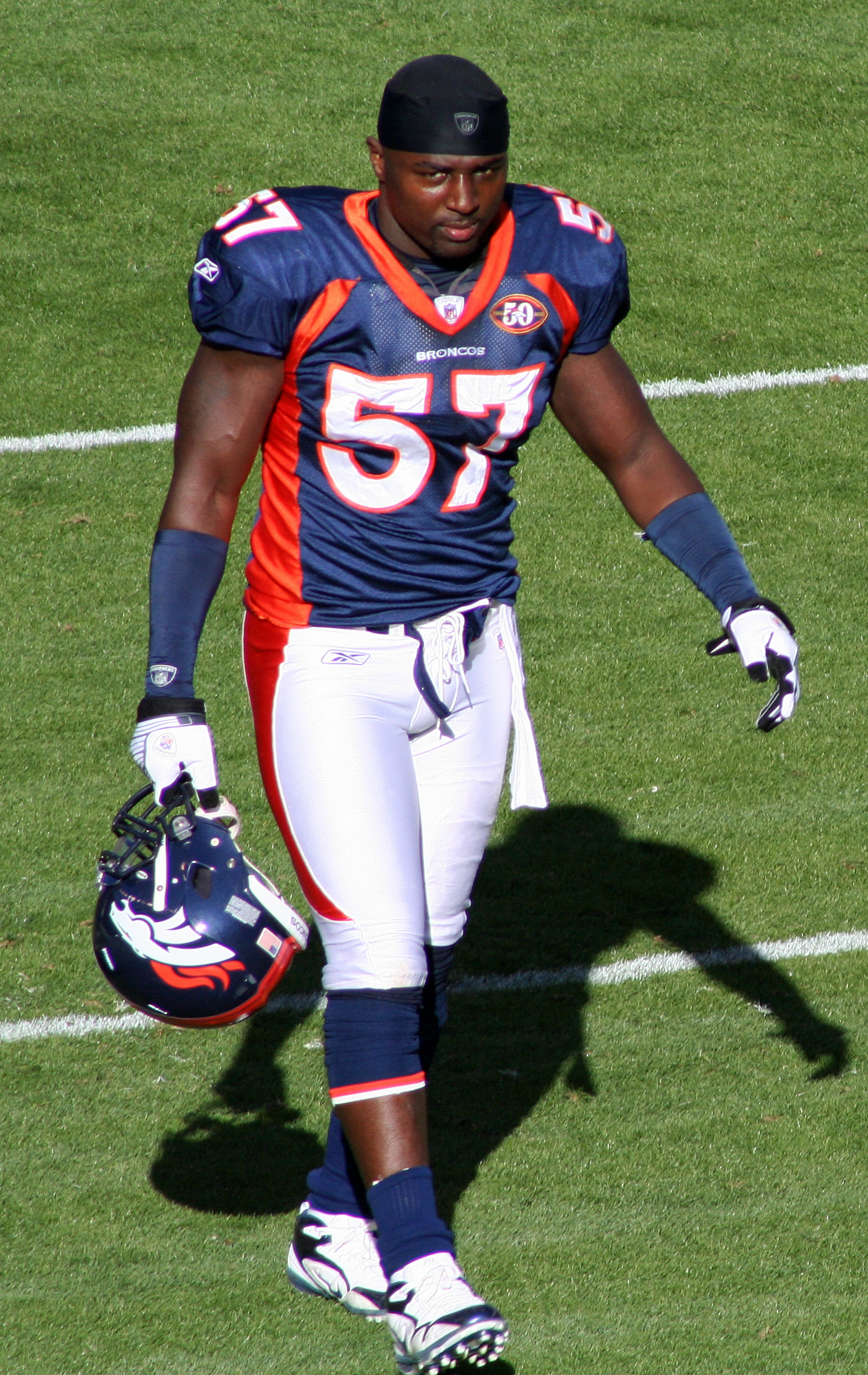
- Haggan with the Denver Broncos in 2009

No. 53, 57, 51
- Position: Linebacker

Personal information
- Born: March 3, 1980 (age 46); Clarksdale, Mississippi, U.S.
- Listed height: 6 ft 3 in (1.91 m)
- Listed weight: 274 lb (124 kg)

Career information
- High school: Clarksdale
- College: Mississippi State
- NFL draft: 2003: 7th round, 228th overall pick

Career history
- Buffalo Bills (2003–2007); Denver Broncos (2008–2011); St. Louis Rams (2012)

Awards and highlights
- First-team All-SEC (2000); 2× Second-team All-SEC (2001, 2002); 2015 SEC Football Legend

Career NFL statistics
- Total tackles: 293
- Sacks: 9.0
- Forced fumbles: 8
- Fumble recoveries: 4
- Interceptions: 1
- Defensive touchdowns: 1
- Stats at Pro Football Reference

Mario Marcell Haggan (born March 3, 1980) is an American former professional football player who was a linebacker in the National Football League (NFL) for the Buffalo Bills, Denver Broncos, and St. Louis Rams. He was selected by the Bills in the seventh round of the 2003 NFL draft after playing college football for the Mississippi State Bulldogs.

== Early life ==
Haggan grew up in Clarksdale, Mississippi, where he attended Clarksdale High School, played football and was named an All-American. He was named first-team all-state by the Jackson Clarion-Ledger and played in the Mississippi/Alabama All-Star Game. Haggan led his team to the state Class 4A championship in 1997. As a senior, he recorded 158 tackles with three fumble recoveries and earned Honorable Mention All-American honors from USA Today.

== College career ==
Haggan played at Mississippi State University from 1998 to 2002 playing both linebacker and defensive end. Haggan was a member of the Bulldogs’ 1998 SEC Western Division championship squad as well as the 10-win 1999 team that led the nation in defense. During his time at MSU the Bulldogs played in the SEC Championship Game, the Cotton Bowl, the Peach Bowl, and the Independence Bowl. Haggan was a first-team All-SEC selection by the Associated Press and second-team All-America honoree by The Sporting News in 2000 and a second-team All-SEC selection in both 2001 and 2002. He was the Bulldogs’ leading tackler in each of his last three seasons, including 119 tackles his senior season and ranks eighth in MSU history with 359 total tackles.

== Professional career ==
=== Buffalo Bills ===
Haggan was selected by the Buffalo Bills in the seventh round of the 2003 NFL draft, playing in 65 games for the Bills while collecting 78 tackles from 2003 to 2007.

=== Denver Broncos ===
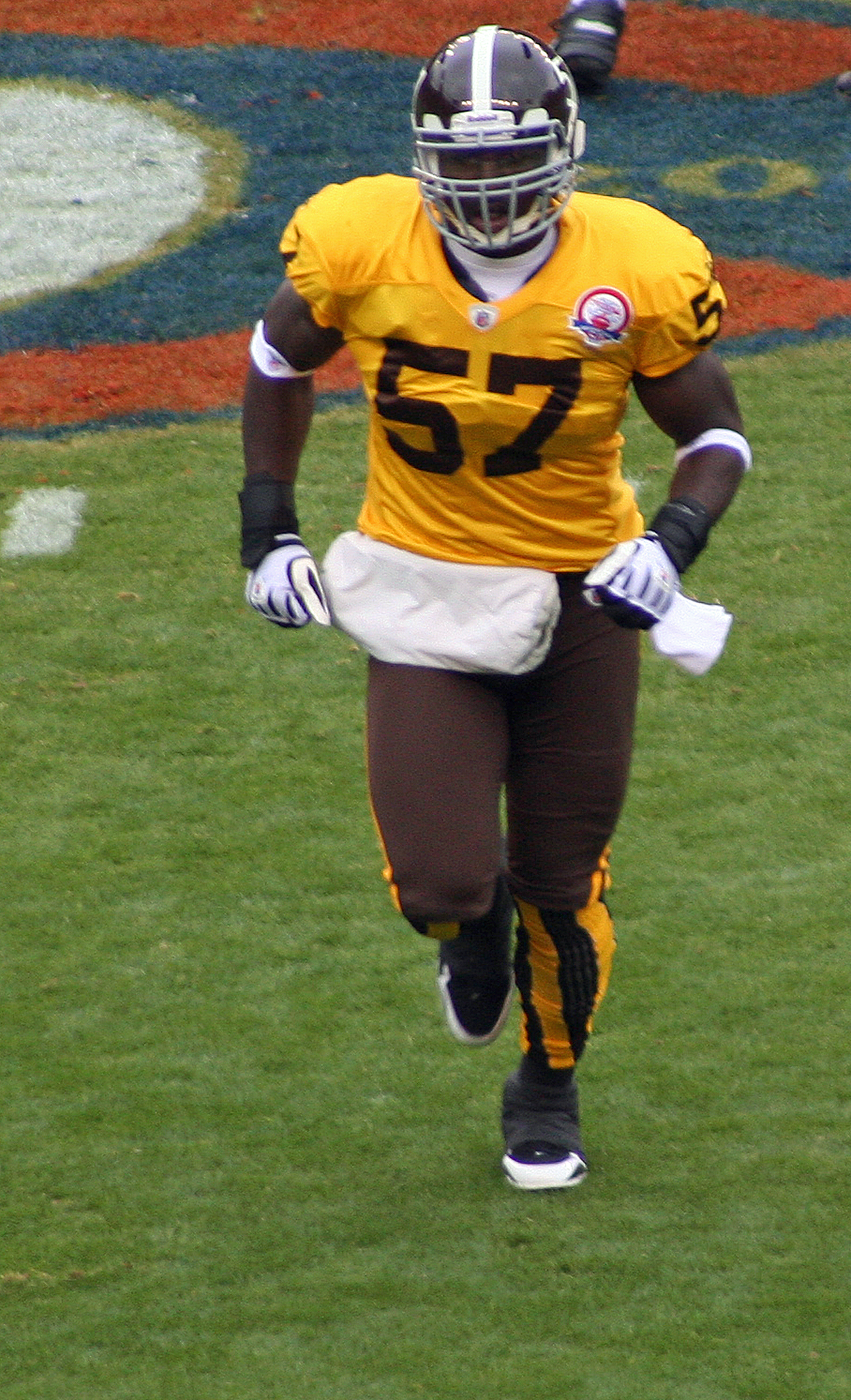
Haggan with the Broncos in 2009

In 2008, Haggan was signed by the Denver Broncos. Haggan was named a starting OLB and a defensive captain for 2009 and started all 16 games that year. In 2010, he was moved to ILB and delivered the best season of his career, with 87 tackles in 16 more starts. Haggan was one of only two Bronco players to start every game in 2009 and 2010. Haggan was valued by the Broncos as a depth player for his versatility, having played all three linebacker positions and both defensive end positions.

=== St. Louis Rams ===
Haggan signed with the Rams on May 15, 2012. During his one season with the Rams he played in 11 games, registering 11 tackles, one forced fumble and one fumble recovery.

During his 10-year NFL career, Haggan had 293 tackles and eight forced fumbles in 132 games.

== NFL career statistics ==
Legend
**Bold**	Career high

=== Regular season ===
Year	Team	Games		Tackles					Interceptions					Fumbles			
Year	Team	GP	GS	Cmb	Solo	Ast	Sck	TFL	Int	Yds	TD	Lng	PD	FF	FR	Yds	TD
2003	BUF	1	0	1	1	0	0.0	0	0	0	0	0	0	0	0	0	0
2004	BUF	**16**	0	19	15	4	0.0	0	0	0	0	0	0	1	**2**	0	0
2005	BUF	**16**	0	22	13	9	0.0	0	0	0	0	0	0	0	0	0	0
2006	BUF	**16**	0	18	14	4	0.0	0	0	0	0	0	0	1	0	0	0
2007	BUF	**16**	0	27	21	6	1.0	4	0	0	0	0	0	0	0	0	0
2008	DEN	8	0	19	17	2	1.0	2	0	0	0	0	0	0	0	0	0
2009	DEN	**16**	**16**	64	52	**12**	1.0	9	0	0	0	0	**1**	**3**	0	0	0
2010	DEN	**16**	**16**	**87**	**75**	**12**	**5.0**	**10**	0	0	0	0	**1**	2	1	0	0
2011	DEN	**16**	1	23	13	10	0.0	3	**1**	**16**	**1**	**16**	**1**	0	0	0	0
2012	STL	11	2	13	11	2	1.0	1	0	0	0	0	0	1	1	0	0
		132	35	293	232	61	9.0	29	1	16	1	16	3	8	4	0	0

=== Playoffs ===
Year	Team	Games		Tackles					Interceptions					Fumbles			
Year	Team	GP	GS	Cmb	Solo	Ast	Sck	TFL	Int	Yds	TD	Lng	PD	FF	FR	Yds	TD
2011	DEN	**2**	0	0	0	0	0.0	0	0	0	0	0	0	0	0	0	0
		2	0	0	0	0	0.0	0	0	0	0	0	0	0	0	0	0

== Personal ==
He is married to Tanika Haggan who was a volleyball player at Mississippi State and also served as a business education teacher and volleyball coach at Rowlett High School in Rowlett, Texas.
