= Mark Brown (linebacker, born 1980) =

American football player (born 1980)

No. 50, 55
- Position: Linebacker

Personal information
- Born: May 19, 1980 (age 46); Paterson, New Jersey, U.S.
- Listed height: 6 ft 0 in (1.83 m)
- Listed weight: 238 lb (108 kg)

Career information
- High school: Germantown (Germantown, Tennessee)
- College: Auburn
- NFL draft: 2003: undrafted

Career history
- New York Jets (2003–2005); Arizona Cardinals (2006)*
- * Offseason or practice squad member only

Awards and highlights
- Second-team All-SEC (2002)

Career NFL statistics
- Tackles: 92
- Sacks: 1.5
- Interceptions: 2
- Stats at Pro Football Reference

Marquis Brown (born May 19, 1980) is an American former professional football player who was a linebacker for three seasons with the New York Jets of the National Football League (NFL). He played college football for the Auburn Tigers, before signing with the Jets as an undrafted free agent in 2003.

== Early life and college ==
Brown attended Germantown High School in Germantown, Tennessee.

He played college football for the Tigers at Auburn University from 1999 to 2002. He was redshirted in 1998. Brown earned second-team All-SEC honors in 2002. He was also invited to the Senior Bowl after his senior year.

== Professional career ==
=== New York Jets ===
Brown signed with the New York Jets on May 2, 2003, after going undrafted in the 2003 NFL draft. He was waived on August 31 and re-signed to the practice squad on September 2. He was released on October 16 and re-signed to the practice squad again on November 12. Brown was promoted to the active roster on December 17, 2003, and played in one game for the Jets during the 2003 season but recorded no statistics.

Brown re-signed with the Jets on March 22, 2004. He played in 12 games, starting six, in 2004, recording nine solo tackles, six assisted tackles, one forced fumble and one pass breakup. He appeared in 15 games, starting 11, for the Jets in 2005, totaling 38 solo tackles, 39 assisted tackles, 1.5 sacks, one fumble recovery, two pass breakups and two interceptions (one of which was returned for a touchdown).

=== Arizona Cardinals ===
Brown was signed by the Arizona Cardinals on May 5, 2006. He was waived on September 2, 2006.

== Personal life ==
Brown has spent time working as a personal trainer.
