= Freddie Milons =

American football player (born 1980)

No. 85, 81
- Position: Wide receiver

Personal information
- Born: June 27, 1980 (age 46); Starkville, Mississippi, U.S.
- Listed height: 5 ft 11 in (1.80 m)
- Listed weight: 187 lb (85 kg)

Career information
- High school: Starkville
- College: Alabama
- NFL draft: 2002: 5th round, 162nd overall pick

Career history
- Philadelphia Eagles (2002); Pittsburgh Steelers (2003); Baltimore Ravens (2004)*; Cincinnati Bengals (2004–2005)*; Team Alabama (2008)*
- * Offseason or practice squad member only

Awards and highlights
- First-team All-SEC (1999)

Freddie Milons (born June 27, 1980) is an American former professional football player who was a wide receiver in the National Football League (NFL). He was selected by the Philadelphia Eagles in the fifth round of the 2002 NFL draft. He played college football for the Alabama Crimson Tide.

Milons was also a member of the Pittsburgh Steelers, Baltimore Ravens, Cincinnati Bengals and Team Alabama.

== Early life ==
Milons attended Starkville High School in Starkville, Mississippi. He rushed for over 1,000 yards and passed for over 600 yards as the starting quarterback during his senior year.

== College career ==
Milons played college football for the Alabama Crimson Tide, where he set the school record for career receptions with 152. In 2001, Milons made 36 receptions for 626 yards and three touchdowns. He won the Most Valuable Player award in the SEC Championship Game in 1999.

== Professional career ==
Pre-draft measurables
Height	Weight	Arm length	Hand span	40-yard dash	10-yard split	20-yard split	Three-cone drill	Vertical jump	Broad jump
5 ft 10 1/8 in (1.78 m)	190 lb (86 kg)	31 1/2 in (0.80 m)	8 3/4 in (0.22 m)	4.51 s	1.59 s	2.58 s	6.84 s	33.5 in (0.85 m)	9 ft 9 in (2.97 m)
All values from NFL Combine

Milons was drafted by the Philadelphia Eagles in the fifth round (162 overall) of the 2002 NFL draft. He signed a three-year deal with the team on June 21, 2002. He suffered a fractured fibula during the team's final preseason game on August 30 and was inactive for every game during the season.

On August 31, 2003, Milons was traded to the Pittsburgh Steelers in exchange for a conditional draft pick. The Eagles would only receive a draft pick if Milons played in a game for the Steelers, but he was inactive for the entire season and the Eagles did not acquire the draft pick. He was released on August 31, 2004.

Milons was signed to the Baltimore Ravens' practice squad on September 7, 2004, but was released on November 10. He was signed to the Cincinnati Bengals' practice squad on November 23 and spent the rest of the 2004 season on the practice squad. He was re-signed on January 4, 2005. He was waived on August 21. He was signed to a one-year contract worth $80,000 with Team Alabama of the All American Football League on July 26, 2007.

== See also ==
- Alabama Crimson Tide football yearly statistical leaders
