= Todd Johnson =

American football player (born 1978)

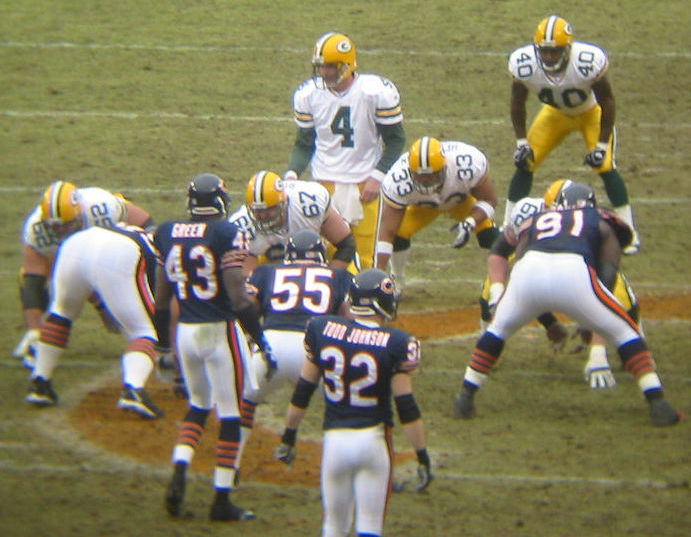
- Johnson (32) with the Chicago Bears in 2005

No. 32, 35
- Position: Safety

Personal information
- Born: December 18, 1978 (age 47); Sarasota, Florida, U.S.
- Listed height: 6 ft 1 in (1.85 m)
- Listed weight: 202 lb (92 kg)

Career information
- High school: Riverview (Sarasota)
- College: Florida
- NFL draft: 2003: 4th round, 100th overall pick

Career history
- Chicago Bears (2003–2006); St. Louis Rams (2007–2008); Buffalo Bills (2009)

Awards and highlights
- 2× First-team All-SEC (2000, 2001); Second-team All-SEC (2002)

Career NFL statistics
- Total tackles: 196
- Sacks: 1
- Forced fumbles: 2
- Fumble recoveries: 2
- Pass deflections: 5
- Stats at Pro Football Reference

Todd Edward Johnson (born December 18, 1978) is an American former professional football player who was a safety for seven seasons in the National Football League (NFL) during the 2000s. Johnson played college football for the Florida Gators, and thereafter, he played in the NFL for the Chicago Bears, St. Louis Rams, and Buffalo Bills.

== Early life ==
Johnson was born in Sarasota, Florida, in 1978. He attended Riverview High School in Sarasota, where he was a standout defensive back for the Riverview Rams high school football team. Johnson was an all-state selection and a SuperPrep All-American as a senior, and set the school record for the 110-yard intermediate hurdles in track & field.

== College career ==
Johnson accepted an athletic scholarship to attend the University of Florida in Gainesville, Florida, where he played for coach Steve Spurrier and coach Ron Zook's Gators football teams from 1998 to 2002. The Gators coaching staff decided to redshirt him as a true freshman in 1998, and he spent the season practicing with the scout team; subsequently, Johnson became a four-year letterman and started in thirty-three out of forty-nine games in which he played. As a redshirt freshman in 1999, he had twenty-four tackles, four passes defensed, one forced fumble and one fumble recovery. During his sophomore season in 2000, he started all thirteen games, led the team with a career-high 102 tackles, and had five interceptions, three passes defensed, one forced fumble, and four fumble recoveries, including one returned seventy-six yards for a touchdown, and received first-team All-Southeastern Conference (SEC) honors. Johnson started all eleven games as junior in 2001, tallying seventy-two tackles, three passes defensed, and two interceptions and again received first-team All-SEC honors. As a senior team captain in 2002, he started all thirteen games, and compiled eighty-eight tackles and two interceptions and was a second-team All-SEC selection. Johnson finished his Gator career with a total of 284 tackles and nine interceptions.

Johnson graduated from the University of Florida with a bachelor's degree in applied physiology and kinesiology in 2009.

== Professional career ==
Pre-draft measurables
Height	Weight	Arm length	Hand span	40-yard dash	10-yard split	20-yard split	20-yard shuttle	Three-cone drill	Vertical jump	Broad jump	Bench press
6 ft 0 7/8 in (1.85 m)	206 lb (93 kg)	30 1/4 in (0.77 m)	9 in (0.23 m)	4.60 s	1.57 s	2.64 s	4.19 s	7.01 s	33 1/2 in (0.85 m)	9 ft 9 in (2.97 m)	19 reps
Arm and hand spans from Pro Day, all other values from NFL Combine.

=== Chicago Bears ===
Johnson was selected by the Chicago Bears in the fourth round (100th pick overall) in the 2003 NFL draft. He played for the Bears for four seasons from 2003 to 2006. He did not appear in any regular season games in 2003, after suffering a broken jaw in a preseason game. He returned in 2004, playing in sixteen games including ten starts, and finished the season with seventy-five tackles. Johnson was Mike Brown's immediate backup during his time with the Bears, and saw extended playing time following Brown's season-ending injury in 2004. The following year, 2005, Johnson saw action in fourteen games, totaling thirty-five tackles. Johnson made thirty-two tackles during 2006, and was released following the season.

=== St. Louis Rams ===
Johnson signed a four-year $4 million contract to play with the St. Louis Rams on March 12, 2007. In his first season with the Rams, he finished the campaign with 29 tackles. In 2008 Johnson made 23 tackles in a backup safety role. He was waived by the Rams on September 5, 2009.

=== Buffalo Bills ===
On October 13, 2009, Johnson signed a one-year free agent contract with the Buffalo Bills. Johnson was placed on injured reserve on January 2, 2010, due to a hamstring injury.

== NFL career statistics ==
Legend
**Bold**	Career high

=== Regular season ===
Year	Team	Games		Tackles					Interceptions					Fumbles			
Year	Team	GP	GS	Cmb	Solo	Ast	Sck	TFL	Int	Yds	TD	Lng	PD	FF	FR	Yds	TD
2004	CHI	**16**	**10**	**75**	**63**	**12**	0.0	**1**	0	0	0	0	2	0	**1**	0	0
2005	CHI	14	2	37	29	8	0.0	0	0	0	0	0	0	0	0	0	0
2006	CHI	12	6	33	26	7	0.0	0	0	0	0	0	**3**	**1**	0	0	0
2007	STL	**16**	1	22	19	3	**1.0**	0	0	0	0	0	0	0	0	0	0
2008	STL	14	3	24	20	4	0.0	**1**	0	0	0	0	0	**1**	0	0	0
2009	BUF	8	0	5	3	2	0.0	0	0	0	0	0	0	0	**1**	0	0
		80	22	196	160	36	1.0	2	0	0	0	0	5	2	2	0	0

=== Playoffs ===
Year	Team	Games		Tackles					Interceptions					Fumbles			
Year	Team	GP	GS	Cmb	Solo	Ast	Sck	TFL	Int	Yds	TD	Lng	PD	FF	FR	Yds	TD
2005	CHI	1	0	**5**	**5**	0	0.0	0	0	0	0	0	0	0	0	0	0
2006	CHI	**3**	0	4	2	**2**	0.0	**1**	0	0	0	0	0	0	0	0	0
		4	0	9	7	2	0.0	1	0	0	0	0	0	0	0	0	0

== Coaching career ==
Johnson became the head football coach of his alma mater, Riverview High School, in 2011. He has also been a fill-in substitute teacher since 2012.

== See also ==
- Florida Gators football, 1990–99
- List of Buffalo Bills players
- List of Chicago Bears players
- List of Florida Gators in the NFL draft
- List of St. Louis Rams players
- List of University of Florida alumni
