= Marico Portis =

American football player (born 1979)

No. 61
- Position: Offensive guard

Personal information
- Born: November 29, 1979 (age 46); Birmingham, Alabama, U.S.
- Listed height: 6 ft 2 in (1.88 m)
- Listed weight: 313 lb (142 kg)

Career information
- High school: Vigor (Prichard, Alabama)
- College: Alabama (1998–2002)
- NFL draft: 2003: undrafted

Career history
- Tennessee Titans (2003–2004); Indianapolis Colts (2005)*
- * Offseason or practice squad member only

Awards and highlights
- First-team All-SEC (2002)
- Stats at Pro Football Reference

Marico Jermond Portis (born November 29, 1979) is an American former professional football offensive guard who played for the Tennessee Titans of the National Football League (NFL). He played college football for the Alabama Crimson Tide.

== Early life ==
Marico Jermond Portis was born on November 29, 1979, in Birmingham, Alabama. He played high school football at Vigor High School in Prichard, Alabama, earning All-State honors twice and USA Today honorable mention All-American honors once.

== College career ==
Portis enrolled at the University of Alabama to play college football for the Crimson Tide. He redshirted the 1998 season. He was a letterman in 1999, 2001, and 2002. Portis also played for the varsity team in 2000 but did not earn a letter. He was a two-year starter. In November 2002, The Tuscaloosa News said Portis was an "unsung hero on the Alabama offensive line". He was named second-team All-Southeastern Conference (SEC) by the Associated Press and first-team All-SEC by the Coaches for his performance at offensive guard during the 2002 season.

== Professional career ==
After going undrafted in the 2003 NFL draft, Portis signed with the Tennessee Titans on May 6, 2003. He was waived on August 29, signed to the practice squad on September 2, released on November 4, signed to the practice squad again on November 12, released again on December 9, signed to the practice squad for the third time on December 17, released for the fourth time on December 23, 2003, and signed to the practice squad for the fourth time on January 6, 2004. Portis re-signed with the Titans on March 23, 2004. He was waived on September 5 and signed to the practice squad on September 14. He was promoted to the active roster for the first time on December 31, 2004, and played in the regular season finale on January 2, 2005.

Portis became a free agent after the 2004 season, and signed with the Indianapolis Colts on March 31, 2005. He was waived on August 16, 2005.
