= Kindal Moorehead =

American football player and coach (born 1978)

No. 94
- Position: Defensive tackle

Personal information
- Born: October 14, 1978 (age 48); Memphis, Tennessee, U.S.
- Listed height: 6 ft 2 in (1.88 m)
- Listed weight: 285 lb (129 kg)

Career information
- High school: Melrose (Memphis)
- College: Alabama
- NFL draft: 2003: 5th round, 145th overall pick

Career history
- Carolina Panthers (2003–2007); Atlanta Falcons (2008)

Awards and highlights
- First-team All-SEC (2002); 2× Second-team All-SEC (1999, 2001)

Career NFL statistics
- Total tackles: 123
- Sacks: 10.5
- Forced fumbles: 2
- Fumble recoveries: 3
- Interceptions: 1
- Defensive touchdowns: 1
- Stats at Pro Football Reference

Kindal Jerome Moorehead (born October 14, 1978) is an American former professional football player who was a defensive tackle in the National Football League (NFL). He was selected by the Carolina Panthers in the fifth round of the 2003 NFL draft. He played college football for the Alabama Crimson Tide.

== Early life ==
Moorehead played high school football for Melrose High School in Memphis, Tennessee where he earned USA All-American, Parade All-American, Mr. Football and a state championship in 1997. He was teammates with Cedrick Wilson Sr. who also made it to the NFL and earned a Super Bowl ring with the Pittsburgh Steelers in 2005.

== College career ==
Moorehead was a first-team All SEC college football for the Alabama Crimson Tide.

== Professional career ==
=== Carolina Panthers ===
Moorehead was selected 145th overall by the Carolina Panthers in the fifth round of the 2003 NFL draft. He played for the Panthers from 2003 to 2007. During the 2004 season, he served as a replacement for the injured Kris Jenkins at defensive tackle, despite playing with a sore shoulder.

=== Atlanta Falcons ===
Moorehead joined the Atlanta Falcons during the 2008 season.

== Coaching career ==
In 2010, Moorehead joined Nick Saban's staff at Alabama as an assistant strength and conditioning coach. In July 2020, he was hired at Tennessee in the same capacity.
