= Chris Collins (American football) =

American football player (born 1982)

No. 6
- Position: Wide receiver

Personal information
- Born: August 16, 1982 (age 44); Gloster, Mississippi, U.S.
- Listed height: 6 ft 0 in (1.83 m)
- Listed weight: 192 lb (87 kg)

Career information
- High school: Amite County (Liberty, Mississippi)
- College: Ole Miss (2000–2003)
- NFL draft: 2004: undrafted

Career history
- Tampa Bay Buccaneers (2004)*; Minnesota Vikings (2004)*; Arizona Cardinals (2004)*; Pittsburgh Steelers (2004–2005)*; → Hamburg Sea Devils (2005)
- * Offseason or practice squad member only

Awards and highlights
- First-team All-SEC (2003); Second-team All-SEC (2002)

Chris Collins (born August 20, 1982) is an American former professional football player who was a wide receiver for one season with the Pittsburgh Steelers of the National Football League (NFL). He played college football for the Ole Miss Rebels.
