= Jarret Johnson =

American football player (born 1981)

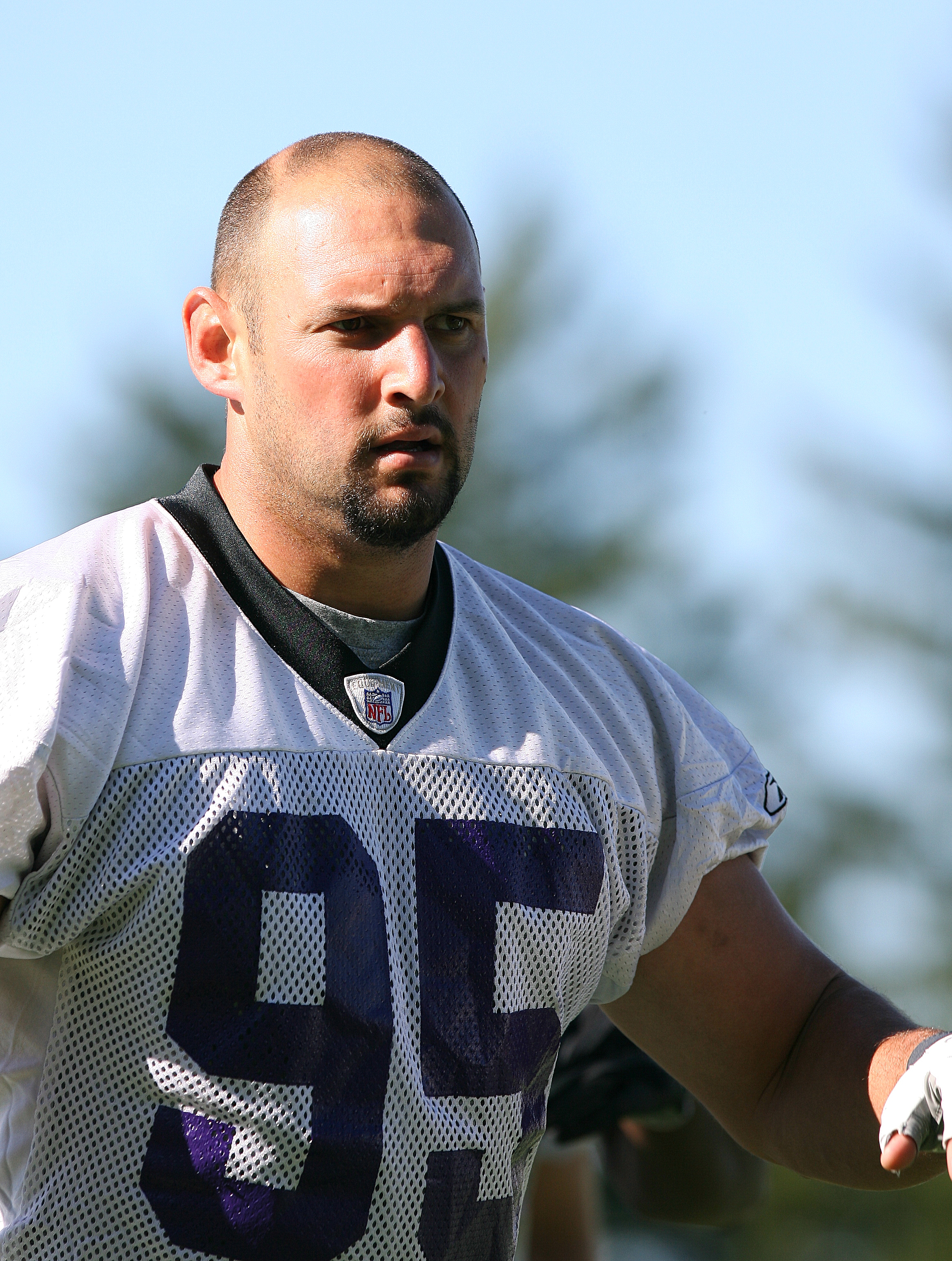
- Johnson with the Baltimore Ravens in 2007

No. 76, 95, 96
- Position: Linebacker

Personal information
- Born: August 14, 1981 (age 45); Cedar Key, Florida, U.S.
- Listed height: 6 ft 3 in (1.91 m)
- Listed weight: 260 lb (118 kg)

Career information
- High school: Chiefland (Chiefland, Florida)
- College: Alabama (1999–2002)
- NFL draft: 2003: 4th round, 109th overall pick

Career history
- Baltimore Ravens (2003–2011); San Diego Chargers (2012–2014)

Awards and highlights
- Third-team All-American (2002); 2× First-team All-SEC (2001, 2002)

Career NFL statistics
- Total tackles: 526
- Sacks: 25.5
- Forced fumbles: 11
- Fumble recoveries: 3
- Interceptions: 3
- Defensive touchdowns: 2
- Stats at Pro Football Reference

Jarret Webster Johnson (born August 14, 1981) is an American former professional football player who was a linebacker for 12 seasons in the National Football League (NFL). He played college football for the Alabama Crimson Tide and was selected by the Baltimore Ravens in the fourth round of the 2003 NFL draft. He also played for the San Diego Chargers.

== Early life ==
Johnson grew up mostly in Cedar Key, Florida and attended Chiefland High School where he was a second-team all-state defensive end and tackle as a junior. He also led his team to the State Title game.

== College career ==
Johnson attended the University of Alabama where he played defensive end for the Crimson Tide. He was the only 2-time captain in Alabama Crimson Tide history. As a senior, he was a First-team SEC pick and Second-team All-American, he finished second in University of Alabama history with 23 sacks. His 25 tackles for a loss tied Leroy Cook (1972–75) for second place on the school's career-record list behind Kindal Moorehead's record of 34 (1998–2002). He was a public relations major.

When Johnson left Alabama, he ranked second in sacks and was tied for second in tackles for loss in school history. Only the late Derrick Thomas had more sacks.

== Professional career ==
Pre-draft measurables
| Height | Weight | Arm length | Hand span | 40-yard dash | 10-yard split | 20-yard split | 20-yard shuttle | Three-cone drill | Vertical jump | Broad jump | Bench press | Wonderlic |
|---|---|---|---|---|---|---|---|---|---|---|---|---|
| 6 ft 2 5/8 in (1.90 m) | 284 lb (129 kg) | 31 1/2 in (0.80 m) | 9 in (0.23 m) | 5.09 s | 1.76 s | 2.94 s | 4.52 s | 7.72 s | 28.5 in (0.72 m) | 8 ft 11 in (2.72 m) | 21 reps | 20 |
All values from NFL Combine

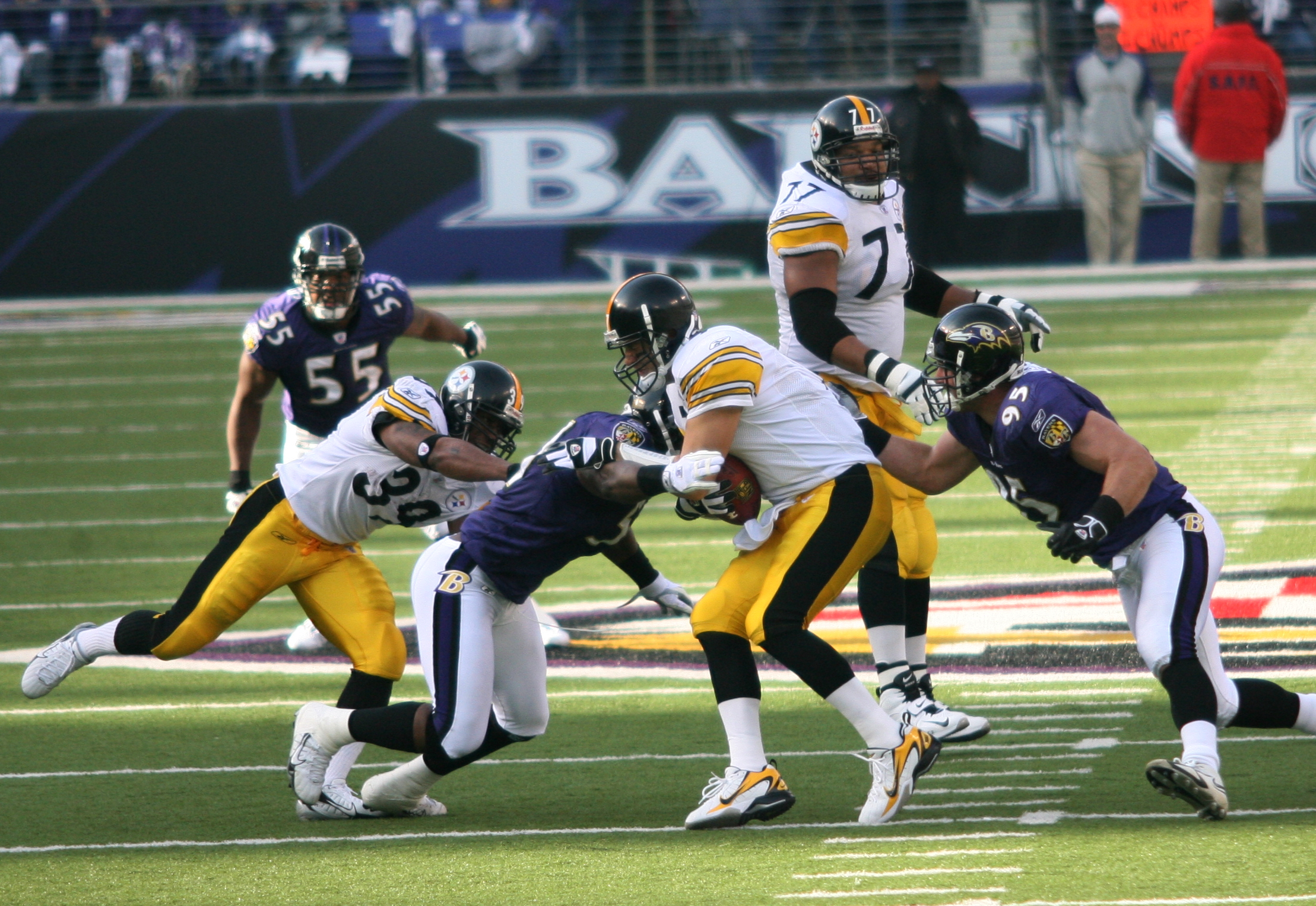
Johnson (95) and Bart Scott sacking Ben Roethlisberger of the Pittsburgh Steelers in 2006. Terrell Suggs looks on.

=== Baltimore Ravens ===
Johnson was selected in the fourth round (109th overall) of the 2003 NFL draft by the Baltimore Ravens. In his rookie season he played in 15 games and started one contest, recording 18 tackles in the process for Baltimore. He started his first NFL game on November 30 versus the San Francisco 49ers. The following season, he played in 16 games posting 30 tackles. That season, he also recorded his first career interception which he returned for his first NFL touchdown versus the Miami Dolphins on January 2. In 2005, he again saw action in all 16 games and this time he started 12 of them. He finished the season with 61 tackles and 1.5 sacks. In the 2006 season, his fourth with the team, he played in all 16 games starting two and finished the campaign with 35 tackles. On March 3, 2007, Johnson signed a 5-year $21.7 million deal with the Ravens that included $8.1 million in bonuses/guaranteed money. In 2007 Johnson started all 16 games for the first time in his career and finished the season with a career-high 94 tackles (59 solo), despite being slowed for much of the year with a broken thumb. The next season, 2008, he again started all 16 games for the finishing with 82 tackles (46 solo), a career-high 5 sacks, 4 passes defensed, 2 forced fumbles, and 1 fumble recovery as part of the NFL's second ranked defense.

In 2009, Johnson was named in Pro Football Weekly's list of the ten most underrated players in the NFL. He made 50 tackles (36 solo), 6 sacks, 1 forced fumble, and 2 interceptions in the 2009 NFL season.

In 2010, Johnson surpassed Peter Boulware's franchise record for consecutive starts (111), starting his 115th consecutive game in a divisional round match-up vs. the rival Pittsburgh Steelers.

In 2011, Johnson won NFL Defensive Player of the Week after recovering a fumble and returning it for a touchdown in a Sunday Night Football win against the New York Jets after Haloti Ngata sacked New York City quarterback Mark Sanchez.

He left Baltimore having played in a team-record 129-straight regular-season games, including 80 consecutive starts.

=== San Diego Chargers ===
On March 14, 2012, Johnson agreed to a four-year deal with the San Diego Chargers. Johnson brought stability to the strong-side linebacker position for the Chargers, he also served as a valued mentor for fellow strong-side linebacker, Melvin Ingram, the Chargers’ top pick in the 2012 NFL draft, and he finished his first season in San Diego with 47 tackles and 1.5 sacks. But more importantly, Johnson's consistency and effort helped the Bolts rank ninth in the NFL in total defense and sixth against the run. He was voted along with teammate Malcom Floyd as the Chargers' Most Inspirational Player in 2014. Johnson announced his retirement on February 24, 2015.

== NFL career statistics ==
Legend
| **Bold** | Career high |

=== Regular season ===
| Year | Team | Games | | Tackles | | | | | Interceptions | | | | | Fumbles | | | |
| Year | Team | GP | GS | Cmb | Solo | Ast | Sck | TfL | Int | Yds | TD | Lng | PD | FF | FR | Yds | TD |
|---|---|---|---|---|---|---|---|---|---|---|---|---|---|---|---|---|---|
| 2003 | BAL | 15 | 1 | 24 | 19 | 5 | 0.0 | 5 | 0 | 0 | 0 | 0 | 0 | 0 | 0 | 0 | 0 |
| 2004 | BAL | **16** | 0 | 23 | 15 | 8 | 0.0 | 4 | 1 | 6 | **1** | 6 | 2 | 0 | **1** | 0 | 0 |
| 2005 | BAL | **16** | 12 | 38 | 26 | 12 | 1.5 | 6 | 0 | 0 | 0 | 0 | 3 | 1 | 0 | 0 | 0 |
| 2006 | BAL | **16** | 2 | 23 | 17 | 6 | 1.5 | 3 | 0 | 0 | 0 | 0 | 2 | 0 | 0 | 0 | 0 |
| 2007 | BAL | **16** | **16** | 58 | 42 | 16 | 2.0 | 8 | 0 | 0 | 0 | 0 | 2 | **2** | 0 | 0 | 0 |
| 2008 | BAL | **16** | **16** | 57 | **45** | 12 | 5.0 | **9** | 0 | 0 | 0 | 0 | 3 | **2** | **1** | 22 | 0 |
| 2009 | BAL | **16** | **16** | 50 | 36 | 14 | **6.0** | **9** | **2** | **8** | 0 | **8** | **4** | 1 | 0 | 0 | 0 |
| 2010 | BAL | **16** | **16** | **73** | 43 | **30** | 1.5 | 5 | 0 | 0 | 0 | 0 | 2 | **2** | 0 | 0 | 0 |
| 2011 | BAL | **16** | **16** | 56 | 40 | 16 | 2.5 | 6 | 0 | 0 | 0 | 0 | 3 | 1 | **1** | **26** | **1** |
| 2012 | SD | 15 | 14 | 40 | 27 | 13 | 1.5 | 2 | 0 | 0 | 0 | 0 | 0 | 1 | 0 | 0 | 0 |
| 2013 | SD | 11 | 9 | 33 | 22 | 11 | 3.0 | 4 | 0 | 0 | 0 | 0 | 3 | 0 | 0 | 0 | 0 |
| 2014 | SD | 15 | 14 | 51 | 36 | 15 | 1.0 | 5 | 0 | 0 | 0 | 0 | 1 | 1 | 0 | 0 | 0 |
| Career | | 184 | 132 | 526 | 368 | 158 | 25.5 | 66 | 3 | 14 | 1 | 8 | 25 | 11 | 3 | 48 | 1 |

=== Playoffs ===
| Year | Team | Games | | Tackles | | | | | Interceptions | | | | | Fumbles | | | |
| Year | Team | GP | GS | Cmb | Solo | Ast | Sck | TfL | Int | Yds | TD | Lng | PD | FF | FR | Yds | TD |
|---|---|---|---|---|---|---|---|---|---|---|---|---|---|---|---|---|---|
| 2003 | BAL | 1 | 0 | 0 | 0 | 0 | 0.0 | 0 | 0 | 0 | 0 | 0 | 0 | 0 | 0 | 0 | 0 |
| 2006 | BAL | 1 | 0 | 2 | 2 | 0 | 0.0 | 0 | 0 | 0 | 0 | 0 | 0 | 0 | 0 | 0 | 0 |
| 2008 | BAL | **3** | **3** | 6 | 6 | 0 | 0.0 | 0 | 0 | 0 | 0 | 0 | 0 | **1** | 0 | 0 | 0 |
| 2009 | BAL | 2 | 2 | 5 | 5 | 0 | **1.0** | 0 | 0 | 0 | 0 | 0 | 0 | 0 | 0 | 0 | 0 |
| 2010 | BAL | 2 | 2 | 4 | 2 | 2 | 0.0 | **1** | 0 | 0 | 0 | 0 | 0 | 0 | 0 | 0 | 0 |
| 2011 | BAL | 2 | 2 | 6 | 3 | **3** | 0.0 | 0 | 0 | 0 | 0 | 0 | 0 | 0 | 0 | 0 | 0 |
| 2013 | SD | 2 | 2 | **11** | **9** | 2 | **1.0** | **1** | 0 | 0 | 0 | 0 | 0 | 0 | 0 | 0 | 0 |
| Career | | 13 | 11 | 34 | 27 | 7 | 2.0 | 2 | 0 | 0 | 0 | 0 | 0 | 1 | 0 | 0 | 0 |

== Post-retirement ==
In 2017 Johnson joined the Ravens' radio broadcast crew, to serve as a color analyst for four regular-season games.

== Personal life ==
Johnson married Anna Grimes on April 3, 2004. They reside in Niceville, Florida, close to Eglin Air Force Base.

Johnson is an avid outdoorsman who loves to boat, hunt and fish. He comes from a family with a long and trying legacy of men who made a living as commercial crabbers and fishermen. Beginning with his great-grandfather, all of the men in the Johnson family worked on the water, including his father, Ludwig, who was lost at sea two weeks before Jarret's eighth birthday.
