= Ahmaad Galloway =

American football player (1980–2023)

No. 27, 30, 28, 29
- Position: Running back

Personal information
- Born: March 10, 1980; Millington, Tennessee, U.S.
- Died: January 9, 2023 (aged 42)

Career information
- College: Alabama
- NFL draft: 2003: 7th round, 235th overall pick

Career history
- 2003: Denver Broncos
- 2004: Scottish Claymores
- 2004–2005: San Diego Chargers*
- 2005: Frankfurt Galaxy
- * Offseason or practice squad member only

Ahmaad Galloway (March 10, 1980 – January 9, 2023) was an American football coach and running back.

== College career ==
Galloway played four years at the University of Alabama. He wore number 29 to honor his former high school teammate, Mario Reed, who suffered a severe spinal cord injury in a game. In his freshman year of 1999, he played sparingly behind former Crimson Tide running back and future NFL star Shaun Alexander. That year, he won an SEC Championship under head coach Mike Dubose. Galloway rushed for 33 yards on seven carries.

Fall 2000 served as his coming out year. His sophomore campaign started on a high note as he scored a pair of touchdowns against UCLA. While not the feature back that season, he still played a significant role in each of the Crimson Tide's games. He shared time with former Alabama running back Santonio Beard; He rushed for 659 yards on 137 carries. Galloway had seven touchdowns to his credit that season.

Galloway's junior year of 2001, gave Crimson Tide fans glimpses of greatness. He rushed for over 230 yards in his second game against the Vanderbilt Commodores. However, his most notable game was against the Tide's biggest rival Auburn University. He rushed for over 130 yards to lead the Tide to a victory over the Tigers. Galloway carried the ball 174 times for 881 yards and six touchdowns that season.

Galloway had great expectations coming into his senior year of 2002. However, in an early game against Southern Mississippi, he suffered a season-ending knee injury. This caused him to sit out the remainder of his senior season in which the Crimson Tide finished 10-3 under former head coach Dennis Franchione. He rushed for 257 yards, four touchdowns on 58 carries. For his collegiate career, Ahmaad Galloway carried the ball 376 times for 1,830 yards and seventeen touchdowns.

== Professional career ==
In the spring of 2003, Galloway was drafted in the seventh round by the Denver Broncos. However, Galloway was forced to sit out during the 2003 season due to the injury he suffered his senior year at the University of Alabama. Very aware of Galloway's enormous potential, Denver labeled him as their "future". Upon reaching full recovery, Ahmaad was sent to the Scottish Claymores, Denver's NFL Europe affiliate. As the Claymore's feature back, Galloway achieved great recognition for his accomplishments during the NFL Europe season. The above-mentioned title was soon short lived, as he was traded to the San Diego Chargers after the 2003 season. Before arriving in San Diego, Galloway spent time with the Frankfurt Galaxy of NFL Europe. At the completion of the 2004 season, Ahmaad Galloway was released from the San Diego Chargers.

== Coaching career ==
In 2010, he accepted a position as Assistant Coach at Oak Mountain High School (Div 6A). He was hired by head Coach Jeff Harris. In 2011, he was hired as Assistant Coach at Thompson High School by Coach Caleb Ross (Div 6A).

== Death ==
Galloway died unexpectedly on January 9, 2023, at the age of 42.

== See also ==
- Alabama Crimson Tide football yearly statistical leaders
