= Glenn Pakulak =

American football player (born 1980)

No. 4, 0
- Position: Punter

Personal information
- Born: April 9, 1980 (age 46); Pontiac, Michigan, U.S.
- Listed height: 6 ft 3 in (1.91 m)
- Listed weight: 220 lb (100 kg)

Career information
- College: Kentucky
- NFL draft: 2003: undrafted

Career history
- Seattle Seahawks (2003)*; Pittsburgh Steelers (2003)*; Atlanta Falcons (2004)*; Oakland Raiders (2006)*; Amsterdam Admirals (2006); Tennessee Titans (2007)*; Amsterdam Admirals (2007); Chicago Bears (2008)*; Oakland Raiders (2008)*; New Orleans Saints (2008); New York Jets (2009)*; Washington Redskins (2009); San Diego Chargers (2010)*; Oakland Raiders (2011)*
- * Offseason or practice squad member only

Awards and highlights
- Second-team All-American (2002); First-team All-SEC (2002); Mosi Tatupu Award (2002)

Career NFL statistics
- Punts: 37
- Punting yards: 1,642
- Punting average: 44.4
- Stats at Pro Football Reference

Glenn Adam Pakulak, Jr. (born April 9, 1980) is an American former professional football player who was a punter in the National Football League (NFL). He played college football for the Kentucky Wildcats and was signed by the Seattle Seahawks as an undrafted free agent in 2003.

Pakulak also played in the NFL for the Pittsburgh Steelers, Atlanta Falcons, Tennessee Titans, Chicago Bears, Oakland Raiders, New Orleans Saints and New York Jets.

== Early life ==
Pakulak attended Lapeer East High School in Lapeer, Michigan where he was a two-year starter as a placekicker, punter, linebacker and wide receiver for the Lapeer East Eagles football team.

Pakulak made first-team all league and all area punter as a junior and senior, averaging 39.5 yards per punt as a junior and 40.1 as a senior. Also all league and all area receiver and second-team all league linebacker as a senior.

Pakulak played basketball as well, making first-team all-League and second-team all-area as a junior. He took home first-team all-league and all-area and honorable mention all-state in his senior year. On top of this he also played baseball with which he earned second-team all-area and all-league. He was granted the school’s scholar athlete award.

== College career ==
Pakulak spent his freshman year at Rochester Christian University where he played basketball and baseball.

Pakulak transferred to Kentucky where he had to redo his freshman year, was redshirted and punted for the Wildcats' junior varsity team.

As a sophomore, Pakulak was allowed to punt the final three games of the season and averaged 37.8 per punt.

As a junior, Pakulak posted an average of 44.5 per punt with opponents having zero return yards in three games. He was selected third-team All-American by Football News, an honorable mention All America CollegeFootballNews.com, first-team all Southeastern Conference by the Associated Press, and Football News (2001) and second-team all Southeastern Conference by SEC coaches.

As a senior, Pakulak led the conference and ranked third in the nation with an average of 45.6 per punt. He was selected All American first-team by The NFL Draft Report and CBSSports.com, second-team by College Football News and third-team by the Associated press. he was selected as a first-team all Southeastern Conference by Associated Press and second-team by the leagues coaches. He was a finalist for the Ray Guy Award, given to the nation’s top punter. Was awarded the Mosi Tatupu Award, given to the nation’s Special Teams Player of the Year. While at Kentucky, he majored in Kinesiology.

=== Collegiate statistics ===
Year	School	Class	Pos	G	Punts	Yds	Avg
2000	Kentucky	Sophomore	P	11	12	454	37.8
2001	Kentucky	Junior	P	11	56	2,492	44.5
2002	Kentucky	Senior	P	12	66	3,008	45.6
Career					134	5,954	44.4

== Professional career ==
=== Seattle Seahawks ===
Pakulak signed with the Seattle Seahawks as an undrafted free agent in May 2003 but was released on July 27.

=== Pittsburgh Steelers ===
Pakulak was claimed off waivers by the Pittsburgh Steelers on August 4 but was released two weeks later.

=== Atlanta Falcons ===
Pakulak joined the Atlanta Falcons on February 5, 2004, but was cut during training camp on August 15.

He did not play the entire year but did attend a kicking camp in the winter of 2005.

=== Amsterdam Admirals ===
Pakulak signed with the Oakland Raiders on January 19, 2006. The Raiders allocated Glenn Pakulak to the Amsterdam Admirals of the NFL Europe.

Pakulak appeared in all 10 regular season games and helped the Amsterdam Admirals to a 7-3 record, finishing the season in first place and gaining them a World Bowl berth. Also appeared in World Bowl XIV in which he punted a 69 yarder. He had not been exactly shy of getting in the thick of the action before but became an instant fan favorite for preventing a touchdown by making a solo tackle when one of his punts looked to be returned all the way in front of his home crowd. He earned Special Teams Player of NFL Europe Week 9 honors, in which he punted for a total of 317 yards for 7 attempts, with his furthest punt 59 yards, one touchback and 3 inside the 20, averaging 45.3 per punt. Led NFL Europe with an average of 42.1.

=== Oakland Raiders ===
Pakulak was released by the Oakland Raiders on August 28.

=== Tennessee Titans ===
Pakulak signed with the Tennessee Titans on January 13. He was re-allocated to the Amsterdam Admirals for a second year of NFL Europe.

=== Chicago Bears ===
Pakulak signed with the Chicago Bears on January 29, 2008. One of three punters on the Bears' roster, he was waived on June 1.

=== Oakland Raiders (second stint) ===
On August 13, 2008, the Raiders re-signed Pakulak after releasing linebacker Edgerton Hartwell He was waived on August 30 but re-signed to the team's practice squad a day later. However, on September 3, he was released from the practice squad.

=== New Orleans Saints ===
Pakulak was signed by the New Orleans Saints on October 29, 2008, to replace the recently released Ben Graham. On November 9, he made his NFL debut with three punts for 145 net yards for a 48.33 average against the Atlanta Falcons. Overall, he finished the 2008 season with 24 punts for 1,144 net yards for a 47.67 average. He was waived on August 27, 2009.

=== New York Jets ===
Pakulak was claimed off waivers by the New York Jets on August 28, 2009. He was waived on September 2 after the Jets signed tight end Ben Hartsock.

=== Washington Redskins ===
Pakulak was signed to the Washington Redskins' practice squad on October 6, 2009. He was signed from the practice squad on October 10 after starting punter, Hunter Smith suffered a groin injury. He made his Redskins debut with five punts for 212 net yards for a 42.40 average against the Carolina Panthers. He was waived on October 12 and re-signed to the practice squad on October 15. For the second straight week, Pakulak was signed from the practice squad on October 17. In the next game, against the Kansas City Chiefs, he had eight punts for 286 net yards for a 35.75 average.

=== San Diego Chargers ===
Pakulak was signed to the San Diego Chargers on August 31, 2010. He did not make the team's 53-man roster.

=== Oakland Raiders (third stint) ===
On January 5, 2011, the Raiders re-signed Pakulak. On September 3, 2011, the Raiders waived Pakulak.

=== Professional statistics ===
Year	Team	GS	Punts	Yards	Lng	Blk	Avg
2008	NO	8	24	1,144	70	0	47.7
2009	WAS	2	13	498	57	0	38.3
Career		10	37	1,642	70	0	44.4

== Personal life ==
Pakulak's grandfather, Roger Susin, was awarded a Purple Heart during World War II, after losing an arm, and surviving an incident where all of his comrades perished. He was teammate and roommate of, Arena Football League star receiver and former NFL Europe Berlin Thunder star, Aaron Boone, for whom he ended up doing the laundry for a semester over the sale of a coffee table in college. Pakulak enjoys listening to 80s music. His all-time favorite football player is Barry Sanders.

In 2005, Pakulak did not play for any NFL or NFL Europa team, but instead spent the year working at a steel factory and training in New Orleans with his college friend Shane Boyd (who also played in NFL Europa in 2006, but as quarterback for the Cologne Centurions). Pakulak also returned to Lexington to follow some classes there.

Pakulak appeared on the Bravo television series Most Eligible Dallas in 2011.

Pakulak also appeared on the GSN television gameshow America Says in 2019.
