= Tony Yelk =

American football player (born 1981)

No. 14
- Position: Kicker

Personal information
- Born: September 29, 1981 (age 45); Madison, Wisconsin, U.S.
- Listed height: 6 ft 1 in (1.85 m)
- Listed weight: 205 lb (93 kg)

Career information
- College: Iowa State
- NFL draft: 2006: undrafted

Career history
- Atlanta Falcons (2006)*; Jacksonville Jaguars (2007)*; Edmonton Eskimos (2008)*
- * Offseason or practice squad member only

Tony Yelk (born September 29, 1981) is a former National Football League (NFL) placekicker. He attended high school in Poynette, Wisconsin and played on the college football team at Iowa State University. He was a four-year letter winner for the Cyclones and an All-Big 12 Conference and Freshman All-American.

After graduating from ISU, Yelk signed with the Atlanta Falcons, where he spent part of his rookie year on the practice squad. He continued his playing career with the Jacksonville Jaguars in 2007, and signed with the Edmonton Eskimos of the Canadian Football League in 2008.

Yelk is the founder of Elite Kicking Solutions (EKS), which provides instruction to aspiring athletes. EKS is based in Atlanta, Georgia. Yelk also speaks at coaching clinics and is a special teams consultant.
