= Kenny King (defensive lineman) =

American gridiron football player (born 1981)

No. 72, 99
- Position: Defensive end

Personal information
- Born: April 23, 1981 (age 45); Daphne, Alabama, U.S.
- Listed height: 6 ft 3 in (1.91 m)
- Listed weight: 285 lb (129 kg)

Career information
- High school: Daphne
- College: Alabama
- NFL draft: 2003: 5th round, 141st overall pick

Career history

Playing
- Arizona Cardinals (2003–2006); Baltimore Ravens (2007); → Frankfurt Galaxy (2007); Calgary Stampeders (2009)*
- * Offseason or practice squad member only

Coaching
- Daphne High School (Alabama) (2016–present)

Awards and highlights
- First-team All-SEC (2002); Second-team All-SEC (2001)

Career NFL statistics
- Total tackles: 18
- Sacks: 2
- Forced fumbles: 1
- Fumble recoveries: 1
- Stats at Pro Football Reference

Kenneth Bernard King (born April 23, 1981) is an American former professional football player who was a defensive end in the National Football League (NFL). He was selected by the Arizona Cardinals in the fifth round of the 2003 NFL draft. He played college football at Alabama.

King was also a member of the Baltimore Ravens of the NFL, the Frankfurt Galaxy of NFL Europa, and the Calgary Stampeders of the Canadian Football League.

== Early life ==
King played high school football at Daphne High School in Daphne, Alabama, graduating in 1999.

== College career ==
King played college football for the Alabama Crimson Tide and was a four-year starter. He was named second-team All-SEC by the coaches in 2001. In 2002, he was named first-team All-SEC by the coaches and honorable mention All-SEC by the Associated Press.

King played in 43 games during his college career, recording 190 tackles (88 of which were solo) and 11.5 sacks. He was also a two-time Academic All-SEC selection and garnered CoSIDA/Verizon Academic All-American recnogition in 2002. He won the Paul W. Bryant Alumni-Athlete Award in 2023.

== Professional career ==
King was selected by the Arizona Cardinals in the fifth round of the 2003 NFL draft. He officially signed with the team on June 11, 2003. He played in 11 games, starting one, for the Cardinals in 2003, totaling 14 solo tackles, four assisted tackles, two sacks, one forced fumble and one fumble recovery. King was placed on injured reserve on September 5, 2004. He was placed on injured reserve again on August 29, 2005. He was waived/injured on August 28, 2006 and reverted to injured reserve the next day. King was waived by the Cardinals on September 1, 2006. He was later re-signed by the Cardinals on December 4, 2006 but released on December 12, 2006.

King signed with the Baltimore Ravens on February 6, 2007. He was allocated to NFL Europa, where he played for the Frankfurt Galaxy during the 2007 NFL Europa season. He appeared in five games, starting four, for the Galaxy, recording five solo tackles, one assisted tackle, one sack and one fumble recovery. King was released on February 19, 2008.

King was signed by the Calgary Stampeders of the Canadian Football League on February 19, 2009. He was placed on the suspended list on June 3, 2009.

== Coaching career ==
King has been the head coach at his alma mater, Daphne High School since 2016.
