= Waine Bacon =

American football player (born 1979)

No. 26
- Position: Cornerback

Personal information
- Born: April 11, 1979 (age 47); Washington, D.C., U.S.
- Listed height: 5 ft 10 in (1.78 m)
- Listed weight: 191 lb (87 kg)

Career information
- High school: McNamara (Forestville, Maryland)
- College: Alabama
- NFL draft: 2003: 6th round, 202nd overall pick

Career history
- Atlanta Falcons (2003)*; Tampa Bay Buccaneers (2003)*; Indianapolis Colts (2003–2004); Indianapolis Colts (2006)*; Nashville Kats (2007); Dallas Desperados (2007)
- * Offseason or practice squad member only

Career NFL statistics
- Tackles: 16
- INT: 1
- Passes defended: 3
- Stats at Pro Football Reference

Waine Bacon (born April 11, 1979) is an American former professional football player who was a cornerback in the National Football League (NFL). He was selected by the Atlanta Falcons in the sixth round of the 2003 NFL draft. He played college football at Alabama.

== Early life and college ==
Bacon attended Bishop McNamara High School in Forestville, Maryland. He played college football for the Alabama Crimson Tide. He recorded four interceptions his senior season in 2002.

== Professional career ==
Bacon was selected by the Atlanta Falcons in the sixth round, with the 202nd overall pick, of the 2003 NFL draft. He officially signed with the team on June 18, 2003. He was waived on August 30, 2003.

Bacon was signed to the practice squad of the Tampa Bay Buccaneers on September 4, 2003. He was released on September 9, 2003.

Bacon was signed to the Indianapolis Colts' practice squad on December 10, 2003. He signed a reserve/future contract with the Colts on January 9, 2004. He was waived on September 5, 2004, re-signed to the practice squad on September 7, released on October 1, 2004, signed to the practice squad on October 6, and promoted to the active roster on October 9, 2004. Bacon then played in 11 games for the Colts during the 2004 season, recording 13 solo tackles, three assisted tackles, one interception and three pass breakups. He was waived on September 3, 2005. He re-signed with the Colts the next year on August 14, 2006, but was waived again September 2, 2006.

Bacon signed with the Nashville Kats of the Arena Football League (AFL) on October 9, 2006. He played in one game for the Kats during the 2007 season, totaling five solo tackles. He was waived on March 5, 2007.

Bacon was signed to the practice squad of the Dallas Desperados of the AFL on April 24, 2007. He was promoted to the active roster on May 13, 2007, and played in three games for the Desperados, recording eight solo tackles, one assisted tackle and one forced fumble. He was waived on June 13, 2007.
