= Saleem Rasheed =

American football player (born 1981)

No. 51
- Position: Linebacker

Personal information
- Born: June 15, 1981 (age 45); Birmingham, Alabama, U.S.
- Listed height: 6 ft 2 in (1.88 m)
- Listed weight: 233 lb (106 kg)

Career information
- High school: Irondale (AL) Shades Valley
- College: Alabama
- NFL draft: 2002: 3rd round, 69th overall pick

Career history
- San Francisco 49ers (2002–2005); Houston Texans (2006)*; Calgary Stampeders (2008)
- * Offseason or practice squad member only

Awards and highlights
- Grey Cup champion (2008); First-team All-SEC (2001)

Career NFL statistics
- Tackles: 58
- Sacks: 1
- Forced fumbles: 2
- Fumble recoveries: 1
- Stats at Pro Football Reference

Saleem Abdul Rasheed (born June 15, 1981) is an American former professional football player who was a linebacker in the National Football League (NFL) and Canadian Football League (CFL).

Rasheed played high school football at Shades Valley High School in Birmingham, Alabama. As a senior, he was named the state's Gatorade Player of the Year.

Rasheed played college football for the University of Alabama between 1999 and 2001. He was selected to the 2001 All-SEC football team.

Rasheed was selected by the San Francisco 49ers in the third round of the 2002 NFL draft with the 69th overall pick. As a rookie in 2002, he missed substantial playing time due to a nagging quadriceps injury. He also played for the Houston Texans though he was cut during the 2006 preseason.

The Calgary Stampeders signed him on May 7, 2008. He helped the Stampeders win the 2008 Grey Cup. On May 4, 2009, he was released.

From 2009 to 2011 he worked as a teacher and coach at Erwin High School.

In February 2012, Rasheed was charged with food stamp fraud and falsifying documents in Birmingham, Alabama. He pleaded guilty to receiving $5,551 in food stamps while falsely claiming to be unemployed and, in July 2012, he was sentenced to eight months in prison. Rasheed also pleaded guilty to immigration fraud arising from his allegedly marrying a Moroccan woman and subsequently marrying an American woman without divorcing his first wife. In April 2013, Rasheed was sentenced to three years in prison for having sex with two students while a teacher at Woodlawn High School in Birmingham. Although the students were at or above the age of consent in Alabama, it is illegal for a teacher to have sex with students in the state.
