= Terry Jones (tight end) =

American football player (born 1979)

No. 82, 49
- Position: Tight end

Personal information
- Born: December 3, 1979 (age 46); Tuscaloosa, Alabama, U.S.
- Listed height: 6 ft 3 in (1.91 m)
- Listed weight: 260 lb (118 kg)

Career information
- College: Alabama
- NFL draft: 2002: 5th round, 155th overall pick

Career history
- Baltimore Ravens (2002–2005); San Francisco 49ers (2005)

Awards and highlights
- Second-team All-SEC (2001)

Career NFL statistics
- Receptions: 59
- Receiving yards: 493
- Yards per reception: 8.4
- Receiving touchdowns: 5
- Stats at Pro Football Reference

Terry Jones Jr. (born December 3, 1979) is an American former professional football player who was a tight end in the National Football League (NFL). He played college football for four years with the Alabama Crimson Tide. He was selected 155th overall by the Baltimore Ravens in the fifth round of the 2002 NFL draft.

== College career ==
Jones started three years at the University of Alabama, the alma mater of his father, Terry Jones Sr., who was a defensive tackle for the Green Bay Packers from 1978 to 1984. Jones Jr. was chosen as team captain for his senior season, when he earned All-SEC honors after posting 10 catches for 115 yards and 2 touchdowns. He missed five games his junior season after tearing a ligament in his left knee. He started as a true freshman. He has a degree in business from the university.

== Professional career ==
Pre-draft measurables
Height	Weight	Arm length	Hand span	40-yard dash	10-yard split	20-yard split	20-yard shuttle	Three-cone drill	Vertical jump	Broad jump	Bench press
6 ft 2 7/8 in (1.90 m)	265 lb (120 kg)	33 1/2 in (0.85 m)	9 1/2 in (0.24 m)	4.84 s	1.68 s	2.81 s	4.43 s	7.43 s	33.5 in (0.85 m)	9 ft 3 in (2.82 m)	20 reps
All values from NFL Combine

Jones played in 14 games his rookie season, managing one touchdown and 11 catches in 14 games, and posted similar numbers over his three years overall in Baltimore, periodically picking up more game time when starter Todd Heap was sidelined with injuries. He was waived by the Baltimore Ravens on November 12, 2005, after seeing no action with the team, where the San Francisco 49ers were awarded his rights off waivers on November 15, 2005, and Jones finished out 7 games. He was re-signed after the season and ultimately waived in early September during the 2006 NFL season. He was also a member of Team Alabama of the All American Football League.
