= Reggie Myles =

American football player (born 1979)

No. 37
- Position: Cornerback

Personal information
- Born: October 10, 1979 (age 47); Pascagoula, Mississippi, U.S.
- Listed height: 5 ft 11 in (1.80 m)
- Listed weight: 185 lb (84 kg)

Career information
- College: Alabama

Career history
- 2002–2005: Cincinnati Bengals
- Stats at Pro Football Reference

Reginald L. Myles is an American former professional football player who was a cornerback for four seasons with the Cincinnati Bengals of the National Football League (NFL).

== College football career ==
He played college football for the Alabama Crimson Tide.
