= Alabama Crimson Tide football statistical leaders =

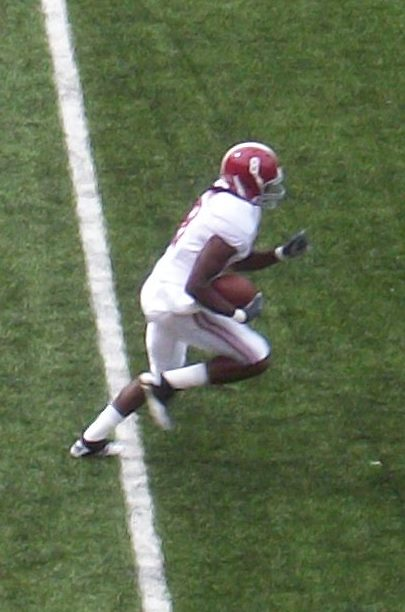
Julio Jones set several receiving records during his tenure at Alabama, which were broken later by Amari Cooper and DeVonta Smith.

Alabama Crimson Tide football statistical leaders identify individual statistical leaders of the Alabama Crimson Tide football program in various offensive categories, including passing, rushing, and receptions and defensive categories, including tackles, interceptions and quarterback sacks. Within those areas, the lists identify single-game, single-season and career leaders. The Alabama Crimson Tide football program is a college football team that represents the University of Alabama in the National Collegiate Athletic Association's (NCAA) Southeastern Conference (SEC).

These stats are updated through Week 11 of the 2026 season. Active players are listed in bold.

== Offensive statistics ==
=== Passing records ===
==== Passing yards ====
Career
Rank	Player	Yards	Years
1	A. J. McCarron	9,019	2010 2011 2012 2013
2	Bryce Young	8,356	2020 2021 2022
3	John Parker Wilson	7,924	2005 2006 2007 2008
4	Tua Tagovailoa	7,442	2017 2018 2019
5	Brodie Croyle	6,382	2002 2003 2004 2005
6	Mac Jones	6,126	2018 2019 2020
7	Jalen Milroe	6,016	2021 2022 2023 2024
8	Andrew Zow	5,983	1998 1999 2000 2001
9	Greg McElroy	5,691	2007 2008 2009 2010
10	Jay Barker	5,689	1991 1992 1993 1994

Single season
Rank	Player	Yards	Year
1	Bryce Young	4,872	2021
2	Mac Jones	4,500	2020
3	Tua Tagovailoa	3,966	2018
4	Ty Simpson	3,567	2025
5	Blake Sims	3,487	2014
6	Bryce Young	3,328	2022
7	Jake Coker	3,110	2015
8	A. J. McCarron	3,063	2013
9	Greg McElroy	2,987	2010
10	A. J. McCarron	2,933	2012

Single game
Rank	Player	Yards	Year	Opponent
1	Bryce Young	559	2021	Arkansas
2	Scott Hunter	484	1969	Auburn
3	Mac Jones	464	2020	Ohio State (CFP National Championship)
4	Bryce Young	455	2022	Tennessee
5	Blake Sims	445	2014	Florida
6	Tua Tagovailoa	444	2019	South Carolina
7	Mac Jones	435	2020	Texas A&M
8	Bryce Young	421	2021	Georgia (SEC Championship Game)
9	Tua Tagovailoa	418	2019	Ole Miss
	Tua Tagovailoa	418	2019	LSU

==== Passing touchdowns ====
Career
Rank	Player	TDs	Years
1	Tua Tagovailoa	87	2017 2018 2019
2	Bryce Young	80	2020 2021 2022
3	A. J. McCarron	77	2010 2011 2012 2013
4	Mac Jones	56	2018 2019 2020
5	Jalen Hurts	48	2016 2017 2018
6	John Parker Wilson	47	2005 2006 2007 2008
7	Jalen Milroe	45	2021 2022 2023 2024
8	Brodie Croyle	41	2002 2003 2004 2005
9	Greg McElroy	39	2007 2008 2009 2010
10	Mike Shula	35	1983 1984 1985 1986
	Andrew Zow	35	1998 1999 2000 2001

Single season
Rank	Player	TDs	Year
1	Bryce Young	47	2021
2	Tua Tagovailoa	43	2018
3	Mac Jones	41	2020
4	Tua Tagovailoa	33	2019
5	Bryce Young	32	2022
6	A. J. McCarron	30	2012
7	A. J. McCarron	28	2013
	Blake Sims	28	2014
	Ty Simpson	28	2025
10	Jalen Hurts	23	2016
	Jalen Milroe	23	2023

Single game
Rank	Player	TDs	Year	Opponent
1	Tua Tagovailoa	6	2019	Ole Miss
2	Gary Hollingsworth	5	1989	Ole Miss
	Tua Tagovailoa	5	2018	Auburn
	Tua Tagovailoa	5	2019	South Carolina
	Tua Tagovailoa	5	2019	Southern Miss
	Mac Jones	5	2020	Auburn
	Mac Jones	5	2020	Florida (SEC Championship Game)
	Mac Jones	5	2020	Ohio State (CFP National Championship)
	Bryce Young	5	2021	Southern Miss
	Bryce Young	5	2021	New Mexico State
	Bryce Young	5	2022	Utah State
	Bryce Young	5	2022	Kansas State (Sugar Bowl)

=== Rushing records ===
==== Rushing yards ====
Career
Rank	Player	Yards	Years
1	Najee Harris	3,843	2017 2018 2019 2020
2	Derrick Henry	3,591	2013 2014 2015
3	Shaun Alexander	3,565	1996 1997 1998 1999
4	Bobby Humphrey	3,420	1985 1986 1987 1988
5	Kenneth Darby	3,324	2003 2004 2005 2006
6	T. J. Yeldon	3,322	2012 2013 2014
7	Mark Ingram II	3,261	2008 2009 2010
8	Trent Richardson	3,130	2009 2010 2011
9	Damien Harris	3,073	2015 2016 2017 2018
10	Johnny Musso	2,741	1969 1970 1971

Single season
Rank	Player	Yards	Year
1	Derrick Henry	2,219	2015
2	Trent Richardson	1,679	2011
3	Mark Ingram II	1,658	2009
4	Bobby Humphrey	1,471	1986
5	Najee Harris	1,466	2020
6	Shaun Alexander	1,383	1999
	Glen Coffee	1,383	2008
8	Shaud Williams	1,367	2003
9	Brian Robinson Jr.	1,343	2021
10	Sherman Williams	1,341	1994

Single game
Rank	Player	Yards	Year	Opponent
1	Shaun Alexander	291	1996	LSU
2	Bobby Humphrey	284	1986	Mississippi State
3	Derrick Henry	271	2015	Auburn
4	Mark Ingram II	246	2009	South Carolina
5	Derrick Henry	236	2015	Texas A&M
6	Bobby Marlow	233	1951	Auburn
7	Johnny Musso	221	1970	Auburn
8	Bobby Humphrey	220	1987	Penn State
9	Glen Coffee	218	2008	Kentucky
10	Bobby Humphrey	217	1986	Tennessee

==== Rushing touchdowns ====
Career
Rank	Player	TDs	Years
1	Najee Harris	46	2017 2018 2019 2020
2	Mark Ingram II	42	2008 2009 2010
	Derrick Henry	42	2013 2014 2015
4	Shaun Alexander	41	1996 1997 1998 1999
5	T. J. Yeldon	37	2012 2013 2014
6	Trent Richardson	35	2009 2010 2011
7	Johnny Musso	34	1969 1970 1971 1972
8	Bobby Humphrey	33	1985 1986 1987 1988
	Jalen Milroe	33	2021 2022 2023 2024
10	Eddie Lacy	30	2010 2011 2012

Single season
Rank	Player	TDs	Year
1	Derrick Henry	28	2015
2	Najee Harris	26	2020
3	Trent Richardson	21	2011
4	Jalen Milroe	20	2024
5	Shaun Alexander	19	1999
6	Siran Stacy	17	1989
	Mark Ingram II	17	2009
	Eddie Lacy	17	2012
9	Johnny Musso	16	1971
10	Cotton Clark	15	1962
	Tony Nathan	15	1977
	Bobby Humphrey	15	1986

Single game
Rank	Player	TDs	Year	Opponent
1	Shaun Alexander	5	1998	BYU
	Santonio Beard	5	2002	Ole Miss
	Najee Harris	5	2020	Ole Miss
4	Johnny Musso	4	1971	Florida
	David Casteal	4	1988	Mississippi State
	Siran Stacy	4	1989	Memphis State
	Shaun Alexander	4	1996	LSU
	Trent Richardson	4	2011	Ole Miss
	Brian Robinson Jr.	4	2021	Ole Miss
	Jalen Milroe	4	2023	LSU
	Jalen Milroe	4	2024	LSU

=== Receiving records ===
==== Receptions ====
Career
Rank	Player	Rec	Years
1	DeVonta Smith	235	2017 2018 2019 2020
2	Amari Cooper	228	2012 2013 2014
3	Calvin Ridley	224	2015 2016 2017
4	D. J. Hall	194	2004 2005 2006 2007
5	Julio Jones	179	2008 2009 2010
6	Jerry Jeudy	159	2017 2018 2019
7	John Metchie III	155	2019 2020 2021
8	Freddie Milons	152	1998 1999 2000 2001
9	Marquis Maze	136	2008 2009 2010 2011
10	David Bailey	132	1969 1970 1971

Single season
Rank	Player	Rec	Year
1	Amari Cooper	124	2014
2	DeVonta Smith	117	2020
3	John Metchie III	96	2021
4	Calvin Ridley	89	2015
5	Jameson Williams	79	2021
6	Julio Jones	78	2010
7	Jerry Jeudy	77	2019
8	Calvin Ridley	72	2016
9	Jerry Jeudy	68	2018
	DeVonta Smith	68	2019

Single game
Rank	Player	Rec	Year	Opponent
1	DeVonta Smith	15	2020	Florida (SEC Championship Game)
2	D. J. Hall	13	2007	Tennessee
	Amari Cooper	13	2014	Florida Atlantic
	Amari Cooper	13	2014	Auburn
	DeVonta Smith	13	2020	Ole Miss
	John Metchie III	13	2021	Auburn
7	David Bailey	12	1969	Tennessee
	David Bailey	12	1970	Tennessee
	Julio Jones	12	2010	Tennessee
	Amari Cooper	12	2014	West Virginia
	Amari Cooper	12	2014	Missouri (SEC Championship Game)
	DeVonta Smith	12	2020	Ohio State (CFP National Championship)

==== Receiving yards ====
Career
Rank	Player	Yards	Years
1	DeVonta Smith	3,965	2017 2018 2019 2020
2	Amari Cooper	3,463	2012 2013 2014
3	D. J. Hall	2,923	2004 2005 2006 2007
4	Calvin Ridley	2,781	2015 2016 2017
5	Jerry Jeudy	2,742	2017 2018 2019
6	Julio Jones	2,653	2008 2009 2010
7	John Metchie III	2,081	2019 2020 2021
8	Ozzie Newsome	2,070	1974 1975 1976 1977
10	**Ryan Coleman-Williams**	2,063	2024 2025 2026
9	Jaylen Waddle	1,999	2018 2019 2020

Single season
Rank	Player	Yards	Year
1	DeVonta Smith	1,856	2020
2	Amari Cooper	1,727	2014
3	Jameson Williams	1,572	2021
4	Jerry Jeudy	1,315	2018
5	DeVonta Smith	1,256	2019
6	Jerry Jeudy	1,163	2019
7	John Metchie III	1,142	2021
8	Julio Jones	1,133	2010
9	D. J. Hall	1,056	2006
10	Calvin Ridley	1,045	2015

Single game
Rank	Player	Yards	Year	Opponent
1	DeVonta Smith	274	2019	Ole Miss
2	DeVonta Smith	231	2020	LSU
3	Amari Cooper	224	2014	Tennessee
	Amari Cooper	224	2014	Auburn
5	Julio Jones	221	2010	Tennessee
6	David Palmer	217	1993	Vanderbilt
7	DeVonta Smith	215	2020	Ohio State (CFP National Championship)
8	DeVonta Smith	213	2019	LSU
9	O. J. Howard	208	2015	Clemson (CFP National Championship)
10	Jerry Jeudy	204	2019	Michigan (Citrus Bowl)

==== Receiving touchdowns ====
Career
Rank	Player	TDs	Years
1	DeVonta Smith	46	2017 2018 2019 2020
2	Amari Cooper	31	2012 2013 2014
3	Jerry Jeudy	26	2017 2018 2019
4	Henry Ruggs III	24	2017 2018 2019
5	Calvin Ridley	19	2015 2016 2017
6	Dennis Homan	18	1965 1966 1967
7	D. J. Hall	17	2004 2005 2006 2007
	Jaylen Waddle	17	2018 2019 2020
	**Ryan Coleman-Williams**	17	2024 2025 2026
10	Ozzie Newsome	16	1974 1975 1976 1977

Single season
Rank	Player	TDs	Year
1	DeVonta Smith	23	2020
2	Amari Cooper	16	2014
3	Jameson Williams	15	2021
4	Jerry Jeudy	14	2018
5	DeVonta Smith	13	2019
6	Amari Cooper	11	2012
	Henry Ruggs III	11	2018
8	Al Lary	10	1950
	Jerry Jeudy	10	2019
10	Dennis Homan	9	1967

Single game
Rank	Player	TDs	Year	Opponent
1	DeVonta Smith	5	2019	Ole Miss
2	DeVonta Smith	4	2020	Mississippi State
3	Al Lary	3	1950	Tulane
	Al Lary	3	1950	Southern Miss
	Dennis Homan	3	1968	Southern Miss
	Michael Vaughn	3	1998	Southern Miss
	Amari Cooper	3	2014	Florida
	Amari Cooper	3	2014	Auburn
	ArDarius Stewart	3	2016	Mississippi State
	Jerry Jeudy	3	2019	New Mexico State
	Jaylen Waddle	3	2019	Auburn
	DeVonta Smith	3	2020	LSU
	Najee Harris	3	2020	Florida (SEC Championship Game)
	DeVonta Smith	3	2020	Notre Dame (Rose Bowl)
	DeVonta Smith	3	2020	Ohio State (CFP National Championship)
	Jameson Williams	3	2021	New Mexico State
	Jameson Williams	3	2021	Arkansas
	Isaiah Horton	3	2025	Auburn

=== Total offense (combined passing/rushing stats) ===
==== Combined yards ====
Career
Rank	Player	Yards	Years
1	A. J. McCarron	8,969	2010 2011 2012 2013
2	Bryce Young	8,518	2020 2021 2022
3	John Parker Wilson	8,099	2005 2006 2007 2008
4	Tua Tagovailoa	7,782	2017 2018 2019
5	Jalen Hurts	7,606	2016 2017 2018
6	Jalen Milroe	7,593	2021 2022 2023 2024
7	Brodie Croyle	6,205	2002 2003 2004 2005
8	Mac Jones	6,168	2018 2019 2020
9	Andrew Zow	5,958	1998 1999 2000 2001
10	Greg McElroy	5,762	2007 2008 2009 2010

Single season
Rank	Player	Yards	Year
1	Bryce Young	4,872	2021
2	Mac Jones	4,514	2020
3	Tua Tagovailoa	4,156	2018
4	Blake Sims	3,837	2014
5	Jalen Hurts	3,734	2016
6	Ty Simpson	3,660	2025
7	Jalen Milroe	3,570	2024
8	Bryce Young	3,513	2022
9	Jalen Milroe	3,365	2023
10	Jake Coker	3,178	2015

Single game
Rank	Player	Yards	Year	Opponent
1	Bryce Young	548	2021	Arkansas
2	Jalen Milroe	491	2024	Georgia
3	Blake Sims	484	2014	Florida
4	Mac Jones	475	2020	Ohio State (CFP National Championship)
5	Bryce Young	461	2021	Georgia (SEC Championship Game)
6	Scott Hunter	457	1969	Auburn
7	Bryce Young	451	2022	Tennessee
8	Jalen Hurts	447	2016	Mississippi State
9	Mac Jones	433	2020	Texas A&M
10	Tua Tagovailoa	432	2019	South Carolina

==== Touchdowns responsible for ====
"Touchdowns responsible for" is the NCAA's official term for combined passing and rushing touchdowns.

Career
Rank	Player	TDs	Years
1	Tua Tagovailoa	96	2017 2018 2019
2	Bryce Young	87	2020 2021 2022
3	A. J. McCarron	80	2010 2011 2012 2013
4	Jalen Milroe	78	2021 2022 2023 2024
5	Jalen Hurts	71	2016 2017 2018
6	John Parker Wilson	58	2005 2006 2007 2008
	Mac Jones	58	2018 2019 2020
8	Najee Harris	57	2017 2018 2019 2020
9	Shaun Alexander	49	1996 1997 1998 1999
10	Harry Gilmer	48	1944 1945 1946 1947

Single season
Rank	Player	TDs	Year
1	Bryce Young	50	2021
2	Tua Tagovailoa	48	2018
3	Mac Jones	42	2020
4	Jalen Hurts	36	2016
	Bryce Young	36	2022
	Jalen Milroe	36	2024
7	Blake Sims	35	2014
	Tua Tagovailoa	35	2019
	Jalen Milroe	35	2023
10	A. J. McCarron	31	2012

Single game
Rank	Player	TDs	Year	Opponent
1	Tua Tagovailoa	7	2019	Ole Miss
2	Tua Tagovailoa	6	2018	Auburn
	Bryce Young	6	2022	Utah State
	Jalen Milroe	6	2023	Kentucky
5	Gary Hollingsworth	5	1989	Ole Miss
	Shaun Alexander	5	1998	BYU
	Santonio Beard	5	2002	Ole Miss
	Blake Sims	5	2014	Auburn
	Jalen Hurts	5	2016	Mississippi State
	Tua Tagovailoa	5	2018	Texas A&M
	Tua Tagovailoa	5	2019	South Carolina
	Tua Tagovailoa	5	2019	Southern Miss
	Najee Harris	5	2020	Ole Miss
	Mac Jones	5	2020	Auburn
	Mac Jones	5	2020	Florida (SEC Championship)
	Mac Jones	5	2020	Ohio St. (CFP National Championship)
	Bryce Young	5	2021	Southern Miss
	Bryce Young	5	2021	New Mexico State
	Bryce Young	5	2022	Kansas State (Sugar Bowl)
	Jalen Milroe	5	2023	Middle Tennessee
	Jalen Milroe	5	2024	Western Kentucky
	Jalen Milroe	5	2024	Wisconsin
	Keelon Russell	5	2026	South Carolina
	Austin Mack	5	2026	Chattanooga

== Defensive statistics ==
=== Interceptions ===
Career
Rank	Player	Ints	Years
1	Antonio Langham	19	1990 1991 1992 1993
2	Harry Gilmer	16	1944 1945 1946 1947
	Jeremiah Castille	16	1979 1980 1981 1982
	John Mangum	16	1986 1987 1988 1989
5	Steve Higginbotham	14	1969 1970 1971
	Kermit Kendrick	14	1985 1986 1987 1988
	George Teague	14	1989 1990 1991 1992
	Robert Lester	14	2009 2010 2011 2012
9	Tommy Johnson	12	1991 1992 1993 1994
	Kevin Jackson	12	1995 1996
	Simeon Castille	12	2004 2005 2006 2007
	Mark Barron	12	2008 2009 2010 2011

Single Season
Rank	Player	Ints	Year
1	Hootie Ingram	10	1952
2	Harry Gilmer	8	1946
	Robert Lester	8	2010
4	Steve Higginbotham	7	1971
	Jeremiah Castille	7	1982
	Antonio Langham	7	1993
	Kevin Jackson	7	1996
	Mark Barron	7	2009

Single Game
Rank	Player	Ints	Year	Opponent
1	Bobby Wilson	3	1951	Georgia
	Dicky Thompson	3	1966	Ole Miss
	Jeremiah Castille	3	1982	Tennessee
	Jeremiah Castille	3	1982	Illinois
	Kevin Jackson	3	1995	Georgia
	Rashad Johnson	3	2008	LSU
	Minkah Fitzpatrick	3	2016	Arkansas

=== Tackles ===
Career
Rank	Player	Tackles	Years
1	Wayne Davis	327	1983 1984 1985 1986
2	Tom Boyd	324	1979 1980 1981 1982
3	C. J. Mosley	319	2010 2011 2012 2013
4	Woodrow Lowe	315	1972 1973 1974 1975
5	DeMeco Ryans	309	2002 2003 2004 2005
6	Roman Harper	307	2002 2003 2004 2005
7	Marcus Spencer	303	1997 1998 1999 2000
8	Cornelius Bennett	287	1983 1984 1985 1986
9	Robbie Jones	284	1979 1980 1981 1982
10	Saleem Rasheed	280	1999 2000 2001

Single Season
Rank	Player	Tackles	Year
1	Woodrow Lowe	134	1973
2	DeMeco Ryans	126	2003
3	Wayne Davis	125	1985
4	Mike Hall	120	1968
	Tom Boyd	120	1980
6	Marty Lyons	119	1978
	Keith McCants	119	1989
	Jihaad Campbell	119	2024
9	Saleem Rasheed	115	2001
	Reuben Foster	115	2016

Single Game
Rank	Player	Tackles	Year	Opponent
1	Lee Roy Jordan	31	1962	Oklahoma
2	DeMeco Ryans	25	2003	Arkansas
3	Mike Hall	24	1968	Clemson
	Wayne Davis	24	1985	Texas A&M
5	Leroy Cook	22	1975	Mississippi State

=== Sacks ===
Career
Rank	Player	Sacks	Years
1	Derrick Thomas	52.0	1985 1986 1987 1988
2	Will Anderson Jr.	34.5	2020 2021 2022
3	Jonathan Allen	28.0	2013 2014 2015 2016
4	Kindal Moorehead	25.0	1998 1999 2000 2001 2002
5	Jarret Johnson	23.0	1999 2000 2001 2002
6	Eric Curry	22.5	1990 1991 1992
	Dallas Turner	22.5	2021 2022 2023
8	Wallace Gilberry	21.5	2004 2005 2006 2007
9	Tim Williams	21.0	2013 2014 2015 2016
10	Antwan Odom	20.5	2000 2001 2002 2003

Single season
Rank	Player	Sacks	Year
1	Derrick Thomas	27.0	1988
2	Derrick Thomas	18.0	1987
3	Will Anderson Jr.	17.5	2021
4	Jonathan Allen	12.0	2015
5	Emanuel King	11.0	1983
6	John Copeland	10.5	1992
	Eric Curry	10.5	1992
	Tim Williams	10.5	2015
	Jonathan Allen	10.5	2016
10	Cornelius Bennett	10.0	1986
	Darrell Blackburn	10.0	1995
	Damien Jeffries	10.0	1994
	Jeremy Nunley	10.0	1993
	Wallace Gilberry	10.0	2007
	Will Anderson Jr.	10.0	2022
	Dallas Turner	10.0	2023

Single game
Rank	Player	Sacks	Year	Opponent
1	Derrick Thomas	5.0	1988	Texas A&M
2	Derrick Thomas	4.0	1988	Kentucky
	Leroy Cook	4.0	1975	Tennessee
	Will Anderson Jr.	4.0	2021	Mississippi State

== Kicking statistics ==
=== Field goals ===
Career
Rank	Player	FGs	Years
1	Will Reichard	84	2019 2020 2021 2022 2023
2	Leigh Tiffin	83	2006 2007 2008 2009
3	Philip Doyle	78	1987 1988 1989 1990
4	Michael Proctor	65	1992 1993 1994 1995
5	Van Tiffin	59	1983 1984 1985 1986
6	Adam Griffith	57	2013 2014 2015 2016
7	Jeremy Shelley	44	2009 2010 2011 2012
8	Brian Bostick	38	2002 2003 2004
9	Peter Kim	37	1980 1981 1982
10	Jamie Christensen	29	2005 2006
	**Conor Talty**	29	2023 2024 2025 2026

Single season
Rank	Player	FGs	Year
1	Leigh Tiffin	30	2009
2	Leigh Tiffin	25	2007
3	Philip Doyle	24	1990
4	Adam Griffith	23	2015
5	Philip Doyle	22	1989
	Michael Proctor	22	1993
	Will Reichard	22	2021
	Will Reichard	22	2022
	Will Reichard	22	2023
10	Jeremy Shelley	21	2011
	Adam Griffith	21	2016

Single game
Rank	Player	FGs	Year	Opponent
1	Philip Doyle	6	1990	Southwestern Louisiana
2	Leigh Tiffin	5	2009	Ole Miss
	Jeremy Shelley	5	2012	LSU
	Adam Griffith	5	2015	Auburn

=== Field goal percentages ===
Career
Rank	Player	FG%	FGs	Years
1	Will Reichard	84%	84	2019 2020 2021 2022 2023
2	Jeremy Shelley	80.0%	44	2009 2010 2011 2012
3	**Conor Talty**	76.3%	29	2023 2024 2025 2026
4	Joseph Bulovas	75.9%	22	2018 2019
5	Leigh Tiffin	74.8%	83	2006 2007 2008 2009
6	Philip Doyle	74.3%	78	1987 1988 1989 1990
7	Brian Bostick	73.1%	38	2002 2003 2004
	Andy Pappanastos	73.1%	19	2016 2017
9	Michael Proctor	71.4%	65	1992 1993 1994 1995
10	Neal Thomas	70.6%	24	2000 2001

Single season
Rank	Player	FG%	FGs	Year
1	Will Reichard	100.0%	14	2020
	Jeremy Shelley	100.0%	11	2012
3	Philip Doyle	88.0%	22	1989
	Will Reichard	88.0%	22	2023
5	Leigh Tiffin	85.7%	30	2009
6	Will Reichard	84.6%	22	2022
7	Brian Bostick	84.2%	16	2004
8	Philip Doyle	82.8%	24	1990
9	Michael Proctor	81.3%	13	1994
10	Will Reichard	78.6%	22	2021

=== Longest Field goals ===
Single game
Rank	Player	Yards	Year	Opponent
1	Van Tiffin	57	1985	Texas A&M
2	Ryan Pflugner	55	1998	Arkansas
	Adam Griffith	55	2015	LSU
4	Leigh Tiffin	54	2008	Clemson
5	Van Tiffin	53	1984	Penn State
	Philip Doyle	53	1988	Temple
	Michael Proctor	53	1993	Ole Miss
	Cade Foster	53	2013	Ole Miss
9	Van Tiffin	52	1984	Auburn
	Van Tiffin	52	1985	Auburn
	Philip Doyle	52	1987	Memphis State
	Leigh Tiffin	52	2008	Utah
	Cade Foster	52	2012	Florida Atlantic
	Will Reichard	52	2020	Georgia
	Will Reichard	52	2022	Texas
	Will Reichard	52	2023	Michigan (Rose Bowl)

== See also ==
- Alabama Crimson Tide football yearly statistical leaders
