= Gerry DiNardo =

American football player and coach (born 1952)

Biographical details
- Born: November 10, 1952 (age 73); Brooklyn, New York, U.S.

Playing career
- 1972–1974: Notre Dame
- Position: Guard

Coaching career (HC unless noted)
- 1975–1976: Maine (GA/ADL)
- 1977–1981: Eastern Michigan (DL/OL)
- 1982: Colorado (DL)
- 1983: Colorado (OL)
- 1984–1990: Colorado (OC)
- 1991–1994: Vanderbilt
- 1995–1999: LSU
- 2001: Birmingham Thunderbolts
- 2002–2004: Indiana

Head coaching record
- Overall: 59–76–1 (college); 2–8 (XFL)
- Bowls: 3–0

Accomplishments and honors

Championships
- AP national champion (1990); 2 SEC Western Division (1996–1997)

Awards
- Consensus All-American (1974); SEC Coach of the Year (1991)

Gerard Paul DiNardo (born November 10, 1952) is an American former football player and coach. He played college football as a guard for the Notre Dame Fighting Irish where he was selected as an All-American in 1974. DiNardo served as the head football coach at Vanderbilt University (1991–1994), Louisiana State University (1995–1999), and Indiana University (2002–2004), compiling a career college football record of 59–76–1. In 2001, he was the head coach of the Birmingham Thunderbolts of the XFL.

== Playing career ==
DiNardo went to college at the University of Notre Dame, where he played guard from 1972 to 1974 for coach Ara Parseghian. DiNardo was a member of the school's 1973 national championship team, and an All-American in 1974. Incidentally, DiNardo honed his blocking skills against Rudy Ruettiger, a member of the scout team during DiNardo's time at Notre Dame. The football movie Rudy was based on Ruettiger's life. DiNardo's older brother, Larry, was also an All-American at Notre Dame, playing from 1968 to 1970.

== Coaching career ==
DiNardo began his coaching career at the University of Maine in 1975. From 1977 to 1981, he was an assistant at Eastern Michigan University. In 1982, he joined the coaching staff at the University of Colorado under head coach Bill McCartney. DiNardo was the offensive coordinator when Colorado won the national championship in 1990. The Buffaloes' offensive line coach from 1982 through 1986 was Les Miles, who was LSU's head coach from 2005 to 2016.

=== Vanderbilt ===
In December 1990, DiNardo took the head coach job at Vanderbilt University, starting in the 1991 season. During 1988, 1989, and 1990, Vanderbilt finished 3–8, 1–10, and 1–10. DiNardo took over and went 5–6, 4–7, 5–6, and 5–6 from 1991 to 1994. DiNardo's two biggest wins were when he led the Commodores to victory over No. 17 Georgia on October 19, 1991, and No. 25 Ole Miss on September 19, 1992.

=== LSU ===
On December 12, 1994, DiNardo left Vanderbilt and took the head coach position at LSU. He took over a program that had six straight losing seasons and that had not been ranked in the AP Poll since 1989.

DiNardo promised "to bring back the magic", and for his first three seasons, he had considerable success, including a victory in the 1996 Peach Bowl. As the team's fortunes improved, DiNardo brought back the tradition of wearing white jerseys during home games.

In his first season at LSU in 1995, the Tigers opened with a loss at No. 3 Texas A&M on September 2, 1995. However, during LSU's first home game on September 16, 1995, DiNardo led LSU to a 12–6 upset victory over No. 5 Auburn, a game which went down to the last play. Following the victory, LSU spent the next three weeks in the AP Poll before losing to No. 3 Florida on October 7, 1995. LSU's next losses were to unranked Kentucky on October 14, 1995, and No. 16 Alabama on November 4, 1995. LSU finished the season by beating No. 14 Arkansas on November 18, 1995. The Tigers then went to the Independence Bowl, where they beat unranked Michigan State, 45–26, coached by Nick Saban, who would go on to replace DiNardo at LSU in 1999.

In 1996, LSU began the season with a preseason ranking of No. 19. After LSU defeated No. 14 Auburn, the Tigers lost to No. 1 Florida, and No. 10 Alabama, finishing the regular season at 9–2. LSU went to the Peach Bowl where they beat unranked Clemson, by a score of 10–7. LSU finished the season ranked No. 12.

In 1997, LSU started the season with a preseason ranking of No. 10. After losing to No. 12 Auburn, LSU faced off against No. 1 Florida at Tiger Stadium. LSU upset the Gators, 28–21, on October 11, making the cover of Sports Illustrated. The next week LSU lost to unranked Ole Miss. LSU's only other loss of the season was to unranked Notre Dame on November 15, which the Tigers avenged by beating the Fighting Irish, 27–9, in a rematch in the Independence Bowl. LSU finished the season ranked No. 13.

In 1998, LSU started the season with a preseason ranking of No. 9. They climbed to No. 6 before losing to No. 12 Georgia on October 3. The next week the No. 11-ranked Tigers lost to the No. 6 Florida. After the defeat by the Gators, LSU dropped 13 of the next 17 games, including losses to a No. 10 Notre Dame and No. 13 Arkansas later in the 1998 season. In 1999 LSU lost to No. 10 Georgia, No. 8 Florida, No. 12 Mississippi State, No. 25 Ole Miss, and No. 12 Alabama.

On November 15, 1999, two days after the Tigers lost to unranked Houston at home, LSU chancellor Mark Emmert fired DiNardo, over the objection of athletic director Joe Dean, with one game remaining in the season. DiNardo was given the option to coach the final game of the season against Arkansas, but DiNardo declined (in stark contrast to predecessors Curley Hallman and Mike Archer, who agreed to finish out seasons after Hallman was fired in 1994 and Archer resigned under pressure in 1990). Instead, offensive line coach Hal Hunter was named interim coach, leading LSU to a 35–10 victory over the Razorbacks.

The 1999 season was the last season in which LSU did not participate in a bowl game until 2020. The Tigers recorded 20 consecutive winning seasons since under Nick Saban, Les Miles, and Ed Orgeron between 2000 and 2019, and did not finish with a losing record until 2021.

Saban, then in his fifth season at Michigan State, was named as DiNardo's replacement on November 30. Saban guided the Tigers to a Southeastern Conference title in 2001 and the BCS national championship in 2003 before leaving LSU for the National Football League's Miami Dolphins in January 2005.

=== XFL ===
DiNardo's next head coaching job was in the ill-fated XFL in 2001. He was the coach of the Birmingham Thunderbolts, which posted the league's worst record at 2–8. The league folded after one season.

Unlike the XFL's other teams, DiNardo banned his players from substituting nicknames for their last names on the backs of their jerseys. DiNardo was the only coach who issued a ban; the Orlando Rage's ban was due to a team vote, not the action of coach Galen Hall.

=== Indiana ===
After the XFL folded, DiNardo moved on to become head coach of the Indiana Hoosiers in 2002. He was largely unsuccessful in the Big Ten Conference, never winning more than three games in a season, and was fired after the 2004 season.

== Post-coaching career ==
Starting in 2005, DiNardo worked as a college football analyst for ESPN and could be heard weekly as part of College GameDay. He currently works as a studio analyst for the Big Ten Network and college football expert for WSCR's Boers and Bernstein radio show in Chicago.

DiNardo also owned DeAngelo's Italian Restaurant in Bloomington, Indiana.

== Family ==
DiNardo was born in Howard Beach, Queens. He is the youngest son of Pasquale Richard DiNardo and Maria Inez DiNardo and has three brothers, John, Robert, and Lawrence. He currently lives in Sandestin Beach Resort inside the gates of the exclusive Burnt Pine neighborhood in Miramar Beach Florida with his wife, Terri. He has two children, Kate and Michael.

== Head coaching record ==
=== College ===
| Year | Team | Overall | Conference | Standing | Bowl/playoffs | Coaches^{#} | AP^{°} |
|---|---|---|---|---|---|---|---|
Vanderbilt Commodores (Southeastern Conference) (1991–1994)
| 1991 | Vanderbilt | 5–6 | 3–4 | T–6th | | | |
| 1992 | Vanderbilt | 4–7 | 2–6 | T–5th (Eastern) | | | |
| 1993 | Vanderbilt | 5–6 | 2–6 | T–5th (Eastern) | | | |
| 1994 | Vanderbilt | 5–6 | 2–6 | 5th (Eastern) | | | |
| Vanderbilt: | | 19–25 | 9–22 | | | | |
LSU Tigers (Southeastern Conference) (1995–1999)
| 1995 | LSU | 7–4–1 | 4–3–1 | 4th (Western) | W Independence | 25 | |
| 1996 | LSU | 10–2 | 6–2 | T–1st (Western) | W Peach | 13 | 12 |
| 1997 | LSU | 9–3 | 6–2 | T–1st (Western) | W Independence | 13 | 13 |
| 1998 | LSU | 4–7 | 2–6 | 5th (Western) | | | |
| 1999 | LSU | 2–8 (Note: DiNardo was fired after the first ten games of the 1999 season. Hal Hunter served as interim head coach for the final game of the season. LSU finished the year with an overall record of 3–8 and a mark of 1–7 in conference play, placing last out of six teams in the Western Division of the Southeastern Conference (SEC).) | 0–7 | (Western) | | | |
| LSU: | | 32–24–1 | 18–20–1 | | | | |
Indiana Hoosiers (Big Ten Conference) (2002–2004)
| 2002 | Indiana | 3–9 | 1–7 | T–10th | | | |
| 2003 | Indiana | 2–10 | 1–7 | T–9th | | | |
| 2004 | Indiana | 3–8 | 1–7 | T–10th | | | |
| Indiana: | | 8–27 | 3–21 | | | | |
| Total: | | 59–76–1 | | | | | |
National championship Conference title Conference division title or championship game berth
^{#}Rankings from final Coaches Poll.; ^{°}Rankings from final AP Poll.

=== XFL ===
| Team | Year | Regular season | | | | | Postseason | | | |
| Team | Year | Won | Lost | Ties | Win % | Finish | Won | Lost | Win % | Result |
|---|---|---|---|---|---|---|---|---|---|---|
| BIR | 2001 | 2 | 8 | 0 | .200 | 4th in Eastern Division | did not qualify | | | |
| Total | | 2 | 8 | 0 | .200 | | 0 | 0 | .000 | |
