= Santonio =

Santonio may refer to:

- Santonio Beard, American football player
- Santonio Holmes, American football player
- Santonio Thomas, American football player
- A nickname for San Antonio, Texas
