= 2000 Orange Bowl =

2000 FedEx Orange Bowl
- BCS Bowl Game; 66th Orange Bowl
Michigan Wolverines	Alabama Crimson Tide
(9–2)	(10–2)
Big Ten	SEC
35	34
Head coach: Lloyd Carr	Head coach: Mike DuBose
AP / Coaches / BCS; 8 / 8 / 8	AP / Coaches / BCS; 5 / 6 / 4
	1	2	3	4	OT	Total
Michigan	0	7	21	0	7	35
Alabama	0	14	14	0	6	34
- Date: January 1, 2000
- Season: 1999
- Stadium: Pro Player Stadium
- Location: Miami Gardens, Florida
- MVP: David Terrell (Michigan WR)
- Favorite: Alabama by 2.5 (48.5)
- Referee: Chuck McFerrin (Pac-10)
- Attendance: 70,461

United States TV coverage
- Network: ABC
- Announcers: Brad Nessler (Play by Play); Bob Griese (Analyst); Lynn Swann (Sideline)
- Nielsen ratings: 11.4

International TV coverage
- Network: ESPN Radio
- Announcers: Dave Barnett, Bill Curry, and Dave Ryan

The 2000 FedEx Orange Bowl game was a post-season college football bowl game between the Michigan Wolverines and the Alabama Crimson Tide on January 1, 2000, at Pro Player Stadium in Miami Gardens, Florida. Michigan defeated Alabama 35–34 in an overtime battle. The game was part of the 1999–2000 Bowl Championship Series (BCS) of the 1999 NCAA Division I-A football season and represented the concluding game of the season for both teams. The Orange Bowl was first played in 1935, and the 2000 game represented the 66th edition of the Orange Bowl. The contest was televised in the United States on ABC.

Quarterback Tom Brady, making his final collegiate appearance, led Michigan to the win, throwing for a career-high 369 yards and four touchdowns, while leading the team back from a pair of 14-point deficits in regulation (14–0 in the first half, and 28–14 in the second). Brady threw the game-winning score in overtime on a bootleg to tight end Shawn Thompson. The game was won by Michigan when Alabama's placekicker, Ryan Pflugner, missed an extra point following their own touchdown. This was the first BCS Bowl game to go into overtime.

This was Brady's final game for the Michigan Wolverines. He was selected 199th overall in the 2000 NFL draft by the New England Patriots.

== Scoring summary ==
=== 1st quarter ===
No scoring

=== 2nd quarter ===
Alabama: Shaun Alexander 5 yard run (Ryan Pflunger kick) 9:48 UA 7 UM 0

Alabama: Shaun Alexander 6 yard run (Ryan Pflunger kick) 6:51 UA 14 UM 0

Michigan: David Terrell 27 yard pass from Tom Brady (Hayden Epstein kick) 0:58 UA 14 UM 7

=== 3rd quarter ===
Michigan: David Terrell 57 yard pass from Tom Brady (Hayden Epstein kick) 13:03 UA 14 UM 14

Alabama: Shaun Alexander 50 yard run (Ryan Pflunger kick) 11:00 UA 21 UM 14

Alabama: Freddie Milons 62 yard punt return (Dave Crittenden kick) 8:29 UA 28 UM 14

Michigan: David Terrell 20 yard pass from Tom Brady (Hayden Epstein kick) 5:42 UA 28 UM 21

Michigan: Anthony Thomas 3 yard run (Hayden Epstein kick) 1:01 UA 28 UM 28

=== 4th quarter ===
No scoring

=== Overtime ===
Michigan: Shawn Thompson 25 yard pass from Tom Brady (Hayden Epstein kick) UM 35 UA 28

Alabama: Antonio Carter 21 yard pass from Andrew Zow (kick failed) UM 35 UA 34
