= 1999 Kentucky Wildcats football team =

American college football season

1999 Kentucky Wildcats football
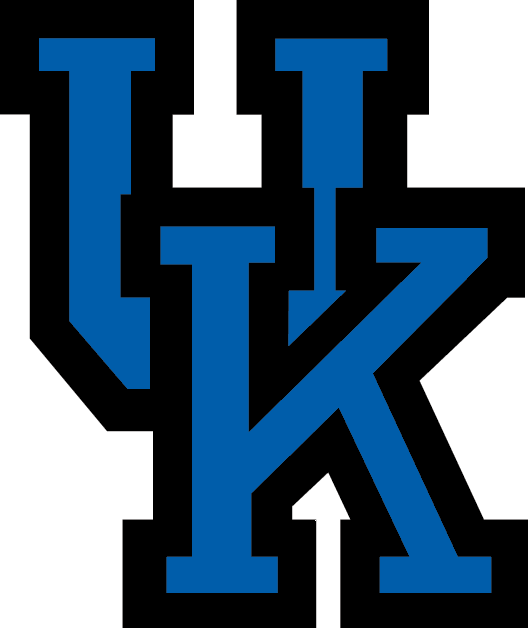

Music City Bowl, L 13–20 vs. Syracuse
- Conference: Southeastern Conference
- Eastern Division
- Record: 6–6 (4–4 SEC)
- Head coach: Hal Mumme (3rd season)
- Offensive coordinator: Tony Franklin (1st season)
- Offensive scheme: Air raid
- Defensive coordinator: Mike Major (3rd season)
- Base defense: 4–3
- Home stadium: Commonwealth Stadium

1999 Southeastern Conference football standings
	Conf.			Overall
Team	W		L	W		L
Eastern Division
No. 12 Florida x	7	–	1	9	–	4
No. 9 Tennessee	6	–	2	9	–	3
No. 16 Georgia	5	–	3	8	–	4
Kentucky	4	–	4	6	–	6
Vanderbilt	2	–	6	5	–	6
South Carolina	0	–	8	0	–	11
Western Division
No. 8 Alabama x$	7	–	1	10	–	3
No. 13 Mississippi State	6	–	2	10	–	2
No. 22 Ole Miss	4	–	4	8	–	4
No. 17 Arkansas	4	–	4	8	–	4
Auburn	2	–	6	5	–	6
LSU	1	–	7	3	–	8
Championship: Alabama 34, Florida 7
$ – BCS representative as conference champion; x – Division champion/co-champions; Rankings from AP Poll

The 1999 Kentucky Wildcats football team represented the University of Kentucky as a member of the Eastern Division of the Southeastern Conference (SEC) during the 1999 NCAA Division I-A football season. Led by third-year head coach Hal Mumme, the Wildcats compiled an overall record of 5–6 with a mark of 2–6 in conference place, placing fourth in the SEC's Eastern Division. Kentucky was invited to the Music City Bowl, where the Wildcats lost to Syracuse. The team played home games at Commonwealth Stadium in Lexington, Kentucky.

== Schedule ==
Date	Time	Opponent	Site	TV	Result	Attendance	Source
September 4	3:30 pm	Louisville*	Commonwealth Stadium; Lexington, KY (Governor's Cup)	FSN	L 28–56	70,692	
September 11	1:30 pm	Connecticut*	Commonwealth Stadium; Lexington, KY		W 45–14	63,879	
September 18	12:00 pm	at Indiana*	Memorial Stadium; Bloomington, IN (rivalry)	ESPN	W 44–35	39,146	
September 25	7:30 pm	No. 3 Florida	Commonwealth Stadium; Lexington, KY (rivalry)	ESPN	L 10–38	70,971	
October 2	1:30 pm	No. 20 Arkansas	Commonwealth Stadium; Lexington, KY	PPV	W 31–20	62,602	
October 9	1:00 pm	at South Carolina	Williams–Brice Stadium; Columbia, SC	PPV	W 30–10	73,150	
October 16	12:30 pm	LSU^{†}	Commonwealth Stadium; Lexington, KY	JPS	W 31–5	67,370	
October 23	12:30 pm	at No. 14 Georgia	Sanford Stadium; Athens, GA	JPS	L 34–49	86,117	
November 4	8:00 pm	at No. 8 Mississippi State	Scott Field; Starkville, MS	ESPN	L 22–23	39,149	
November 13	9:00 pm	at Vanderbilt	Vanderbilt Stadium; Nashville, TN (rivalry)	ESPN2	W 19–17	41,000	
November 20	12:30 pm	No. 7 Tennessee	Commonwealth Stadium; Lexington, KY (rivalry)	JPS	L 21–56	71,022	
December 29	4:00 pm	vs. Syracuse*	Adelphia Coliseum; Nashville, TN (Music City Bowl)	ESPN	L 13–20	59,221	
*Non-conference game; ^{†}Homecoming; Rankings from AP Poll released prior to the game; All times are in Eastern time

== Roster ==
1999 Kentucky Wildcats football team roster
Players
Coaches
Offense

Pos.	#	Name	Class
[[American football positions|]]
[[American football positions|]]

Defense

Pos.	#	Name	Class
[[American football positions|]]

Special teams

Pos.	#	Name	Class

}}

Head coach

- [[]]

Coordinators/assistant coaches

Legend

- (C) Team captain
- (S) Suspended
- (I) Ineligible
- Injured
- Redshirt
