= 1999 Auburn Tigers football team =

American college football season

1999 Auburn Tigers football
- Conference: Southeastern Conference
- Western Division
- Record: 5–6 (2–6 SEC)
- Head coach: Tommy Tuberville (1st season)
- Offensive coordinator: Noel Mazzone (1st season)
- Offensive scheme: Pro-style
- Defensive coordinator: John Lovett (1st season)
- Base defense: Multiple 4–3
- Home stadium: Jordan–Hare Stadium

1999 Southeastern Conference football standings
	Conf.			Overall
Team	W		L	W		L
Eastern Division
No. 12 Florida x	7	–	1	9	–	4
No. 9 Tennessee	6	–	2	9	–	3
No. 16 Georgia	5	–	3	8	–	4
Kentucky	4	–	4	6	–	6
Vanderbilt	2	–	6	5	–	6
South Carolina	0	–	8	0	–	11
Western Division
No. 8 Alabama x$	7	–	1	10	–	3
No. 13 Mississippi State	6	–	2	10	–	2
No. 22 Ole Miss	4	–	4	8	–	4
No. 17 Arkansas	4	–	4	8	–	4
Auburn	2	–	6	5	–	6
LSU	1	–	7	3	–	8
Championship: Alabama 34, Florida 7
$ – BCS representative as conference champion; x – Division champion/co-champions; Rankings from AP Poll

The 1999 Auburn Tigers football team was an American football team that represented Auburn University as a member of the Southeastern Conference (SEC) during the 1999 NCAA Division I-A football season. In their first year under head coach Tommy Tuberville, the Tigers team compiled an overall record of 5–6 with a mark of 2–6 in conference play, and placing fifth in the SEC's Western Division. The team played home games at Jordan–Hare Stadium in Auburn, Alabama.

== Schedule ==
Date	Time	Opponent	Site	TV	Result	Attendance	Source
September 4	6:00 pm	Appalachian State*	Jordan–Hare Stadium; Auburn, AL		W 22–15	78,128	
September 11	6:00 pm	Idaho*	Jordan–Hare Stadium; Auburn, AL		W 30–23	76,365	
September 18	4:00 pm	at LSU	Tiger Stadium; Baton Rouge, LA (Tiger Bowl)	ESPN	W 41–7	80,562	
September 25	11:30 am	Ole Miss	Jordan–Hare Stadium; Auburn, AL (rivalry)	JPS	L 17–24 ^{OT}	85,214	
October 2	6:30 pm	at No. 8 Tennessee	Neyland Stadium; Knoxville, TN (rivalry)	ESPN	L 0–24	106,424	
October 9	11:30 am	No. 14 Mississippi State	Jordan–Hare Stadium; Auburn, AL	JPS	L 16–18	80,394	
October 16	8:00 pm	No. 7 Florida	Jordan–Hare Stadium; Auburn, AL (rivalry)	ESPN	L 14–32	85,214	
October 30	11:30 am	at Arkansas	Razorback Stadium; Fayetteville, AR	JPS	L 10–34	51,133	
November 6	1:00 pm	UCF*^{†}	Jordan–Hare Stadium; Auburn, AL	PPV	W 28–10	75,804	
November 13	5:00 pm	at No. 14 Georgia	Sanford Stadium; Athens, GA (Deep South's Oldest Rivalry)	ESPN2	W 38–21	86,117	
November 20	6:30 pm	No. 8 Alabama	Jordan–Hare Stadium; Auburn, AL (Iron Bowl)	ESPN	L 17–28	85,214	
*Non-conference game; ^{†}Homecoming; Rankings from AP Poll released prior to the game; All times are in Central time

== Roster ==
1999 Auburn Tigers football team roster
Players
Coaches
Offense

Pos.	#	Name	Class
WR	2	Tim Carter	So
OT	73	Kendall Simmons	So

Defense

Pos.	#	Name	Class

Special teams

Pos.	#	Name	Class

Head coach

- Tommy Tuberville

Coordinators/assistant coaches

Legend

- (C) Team captain
- (S) Suspended
- (I) Ineligible
- Injured
- Redshirt

Roster
