= 1999 Vanderbilt Commodores football team =

American college football season

1999 Vanderbilt Commodores football
- Conference: Southeastern conference
- Eastern Division
- Record: 5–6 (2–6 SEC)
- Head coach: Woody Widenhofer (3rd season)
- Offensive coordinator: Steve Crosby (2nd season)
- Offensive scheme: Pro-style
- Defensive coordinator: Dino Folino (1st season)
- Base defense: 4–3
- Captains: Jeff Barnett; Ainsley Battles; Lamont Turner; Todd Yoder
- Home stadium: Vanderbilt Stadium

1999 Southeastern Conference football standings
	Conf.			Overall
Team	W		L	W		L
Eastern Division
No. 12 Florida x	7	–	1	9	–	4
No. 9 Tennessee	6	–	2	9	–	3
No. 16 Georgia	5	–	3	8	–	4
Kentucky	4	–	4	6	–	6
Vanderbilt	2	–	6	5	–	6
South Carolina	0	–	8	0	–	11
Western Division
No. 8 Alabama x$	7	–	1	10	–	3
No. 13 Mississippi State	6	–	2	10	–	2
No. 22 Ole Miss	4	–	4	8	–	4
No. 17 Arkansas	4	–	4	8	–	4
Auburn	2	–	6	5	–	6
LSU	1	–	7	3	–	8
Championship: Alabama 34, Florida 7
$ – BCS representative as conference champion; x – Division champion/co-champions; Rankings from AP Poll

The 1999 Vanderbilt Commodores football team represented Vanderbilt University as a member of the Eastern Division of the Southeastern Conference (SEC) during the 1999 NCAA Division I-A football season. Led by third-year head coach Woody Widenhofer, the Commodores compiled an overall record of 5–6 with a mark of 2–6 in conference play, placing fifth in the SEC's Eastern Division. The team played its home games at Vanderbilt Stadium in Nashville, Tennessee.

== Schedule ==
Date	Time	Opponent	Site	TV	Result	Attendance	Source
September 4	11:30 a.m.	No. 20 Alabama	Vanderbilt Stadium; Nashville, TN	JPS	L 17–28	41,600	
September 11	3:00 p.m.	Northern Illinois*	Vanderbilt Stadium; Nashville, TN	WSMV	W 34–31	28,514	
September 18	11:30 a.m.	at Ole Miss	Vaught–Hemingway Stadium; Oxford, MS (rivalry)	JPS	W 37–34 ^{OT}	41,622	
September 25	6:00 p.m.	at Duke*	Wallace Wade Stadium; Durham, NC		W 31–14	20,483	
October 2	1:00 p.m.	No. 16 Mississippi State	Vanderbilt Stadium; Nashville, TN		L 14–42	37,120	
October 9	1:00 p.m.	The Citadel*	Vanderbilt Stadium; Nashville, TN		W 58–0	17,844	
October 16	1:00 p.m.	No. 14 Georgia	Vanderbilt Stadium; Nashville, TN (rivalry)		L 17–27	39,210	
October 23	6:00 p.m.	at South Carolina	Williams–Brice Stadium; Columbia, SC		W 11–10	74,806	
November 6	2:30 p.m.	at No. 5 Florida	Ben Hill Griffin Stadium; Gainesville, FL	CBS	L 6–13	85,117	
November 13	8:00 p.m.	Kentucky	Vanderbilt Stadium; Nashville, TN (rivalry)	ESPN2	L 17–19	41,000	
November 27	11:00 a.m.	at No. 7 Tennessee	Neyland Stadium; Knoxville, TN (rivalry)	CBS	L 10–38	105,781	
*Non-conference game; Rankings from AP Poll released prior to the game; All times are in Central time

== Roster ==
1999 Vanderbilt Commodores football team roster
Players
Coaches
Offense

Pos.	#	Name	Class
RB	2	Rodney Williams	So
WR	3	Billy Miller	Sr
HB	4	Lew Thomas	So
WR	6	Adam Ditto	So
WR	7	Tavarus Hogans	Sr
QB	8	Benji Walker	Fr
WR	9	Jimmy Williams	Jr
WR	10	Anthony Jones	So
QB	12	Greg Zolman	So
QB	13	Duce Reeder	Jr
QB	15	Sean O'Connor	Fr
WR	16	Zach Winkler	Sr
QB	17	David Wallace	So
QB	18	Justin Purkey	Fr
WR	21	Bo Lancaster	Jr
WR	24	MJ Garrett	Fr
HB, WR	25	Everett Robinson	Sr
RB	29	Chris Mitacek	Fr
RB	30	Jonathan Shaub	Fr
WR	31	Ryan Cuffee	Fr
RB	33	Jared McGrath	Jr
FB	34	Juan Rojas	So
FB	35	Jacob Mason	Fr
WR	36	Jason Shields	So
WR	37	Ethan McDaniel	So
TE	38	Wes Gunter	Fr
WR	46	Shane Daly	So
RB	47	Andrew Kerr	Sr
C	50	Jeff Barnett	Sr
C	55	Jamie Byrum	Fr
OL	58	Jason Tant	Fr
OT	60	Pat Green	Jr
OL	61	Duncan Cave	So
G	62	Dustin Wuest	Sr
OT	64	Brian Gruber	Jr
OL	65	Jordan Hill	Fr
G	69	Matt Hill	Jr
OT	70	Raminté Byndom	Sr
G	71	Bara Cola	So
OL	72	Jim May	Fr
OL	74	Jordan Pettit	Fr
OT	75	JP Fougerousse	So
G	77	Darren Rothenberg	Jr
G	78	Michael Saltsman	Jr
OL	79	Brent Preacher	Fr
TE	80	Elliot Carson	Jr
HB	81	Todd Yoder	Sr
WR	82	Nezih Hasanoglu	So
TE	83	Nick Getter	Fr
TE	84	Tom Simone	Fr
WR	85	Dan Stricker	Fr
WR	86	Andre Woods	Jr
WR	88	Markessus House	Fr
WR	89	Tyson Radtke	So
TE	90	Jaron Stern	So

Defense

Pos.	#	Name	Class
DB	5	Aaron McWherter	Fr
CB	9	Jimmy Williams	Jr
DB	11	Rushen Jones	Fr
S	14	Brooks Collins	Jr
DB	14	Mike Martin	Fr
S	22	Ainsley Battles	Sr
CB	23	Harold Lercius	So
LB	26	Matt Stewart	Jr
DB	27	Jerrol Jackson	Fr
DB	28	Brian Taylor	So
DB	31	Ryan Cuffee	Fr
DB	32	Justin Giboney	Fr
LB	39	David Meadows	So
LB	40	Nate Morrow	So
LB	41	Antuian Bradford	So
LB	42	Justin Winborn	So
LB	43	Brandon Walthour	Fr
LB	44	Lamont Turner	Sr
LB	45	Diek VanNort	Sr
LB	48	AJ McGrew	Jr
S	49	Steve Rock	Jr
DL	51	Joe Doyle	Fr
DL	52	Ryan McSwain	Jr
LB	53	Mike Adam	Fr
DE	54	Chuck Losey	So
DE	56	Ryan Nungesser	Fr
DL	57	William Lowery	Jr
LB	59	Hunter Hillenmeyer	Fr
DL	63	Libnir Telusca	Fr
LB	67	Aaron Lara	Jr
DE	73	Russ Nicoll	Jr
LB	76	Andrew Gardella	Fr
FS	87	Thomas Gallant	Sr
DL	92	Brett Beard	Fr
DE	93	Doyle Crosby	So
DL	95	Steve Trese	So
DL	96	Nick Sterling	Fr
DT	97	Tyler Unzicker	So
DT	98	Ryan Aulds	Jr
LB	99	Reggie Washington	So

Special teams

Pos.	#	Name	Class
K	19	John Markham	Jr
P	46	Shane Daly	So
P	91	Joe Webb	Jr

Head coach

- Woody Widenhofer

Coordinators/assistant coaches

Legend

- (C) Team captain
- (S) Suspended
- (I) Ineligible
- Injured
- Redshirt

Roster
