= 1999 SEC Championship Game =

- Conference Championship
- 1999 SEC Championship logo
Florida Gators	Alabama Crimson Tide
(9–2)	(9–2)
7	34
Head coach: Steve Spurrier	Head coach: Mike Dubose
AP / Coaches / BCS; 5 / 5 / 4	AP / Coaches / BCS; 7 / 8 / 7
	1	2	3	4	Total
Florida	7	0	0	0	7
Alabama	0	12	3	19	34
- Date: December 4, 1999
- Season: 1999
- Stadium: Georgia Dome
- Location: Atlanta, Georgia
- MVP: Freddie Milons, Alabama
- Favorite: Florida by 7
- Referee: Rogers Redding
- Attendance: 74,309

United States TV coverage
- Network: ABC
- Announcers: Brad Nessler (play-by-play); Bob Griese (color)

1999 Southeastern Conference football standings
	Conf.			Overall
Team	W		L	W		L
Eastern Division
No. 12 Florida x	7	–	1	9	–	4
No. 9 Tennessee	6	–	2	9	–	3
No. 16 Georgia	5	–	3	8	–	4
Kentucky	4	–	4	6	–	6
Vanderbilt	2	–	6	5	–	6
South Carolina	0	–	8	0	–	11
Western Division
No. 8 Alabama x$	7	–	1	10	–	3
No. 13 Mississippi State	6	–	2	10	–	2
No. 22 Ole Miss	4	–	4	8	–	4
No. 17 Arkansas	4	–	4	8	–	4
Auburn	2	–	6	5	–	6
LSU	1	–	7	3	–	8
Championship: Alabama 34, Florida 7
$ – BCS representative as conference champion; x – Division champion/co-champions; Rankings from AP Poll

The 1999 SEC Championship Game was won by the Alabama Crimson Tide 34–7 over the Florida Gators. The game was played in the Georgia Dome in Atlanta, on December 4, 1999, and was televised to a national audience on ABC.

== Scoring summary ==
Quarter	Time	Drive		Team	Scoring Information	Score	
Quarter	Time	Length	Time	Team	Scoring Information	Florida	Alabama
1	13:20	4 plays, 55 yards	1:40	Florida	Erron Kinney 3 yd pass from Earnest Graham (Jeff Chandler kick)	7	0
2	11:03	9 plays, 61 yards	4:01	Alabama	Ryan Pflugner 29 yd field goal	7	3
2	2:03	4 plays, 5 yards	2:00	Alabama	Ryan Pflugner 48 yd field goal	7	6
2	0:30	4 plays, 36 yards	1:12	Alabama	Jason McAddley 27 yd pass from Andrew Zow (two-point conversion failed)	7	12
3	3:12	14 plays, 23 yards	7:15	Alabama	Ryan Pflugner 49 yd field goal	7	15
4	11:54	5 plays, 92 yards	2:59	Alabama	Freddie Milons 77 yd run (Ryan Pflugner kick)	7	22
4	11:36	—		Alabama	Reggie Grimes 38 yd interception return (Ryan Pflugner kick failed)	7	28
4	3:58	2 plays, 12 yards	0:49	Alabama	Shaun Alexander 7 yd run (two-point conversion failed)	7	34
Final Score						7	34
