= 1999 South Carolina Gamecocks football team =

American college football season

1999 South Carolina Gamecocks football
- Conference: Southeastern Conference
- Eastern Division
- Record: 0–11 (0–8 SEC)
- Head coach: Lou Holtz (1st season)
- Offensive coordinator: Skip Holtz (1st season)
- Offensive scheme: Multiple
- Defensive coordinator: Charlie Strong (1st season)
- Base defense: 4–3
- Home stadium: Williams–Brice Stadium

1999 Southeastern Conference football standings
| | Conf. | | | Overall |
| Team | W | | L | W | | L |
|---|---|---|---|---|---|---|
Eastern Division
| No. 12 Florida x | 7 | – | 1 | 9 | – | 4 |
| No. 9 Tennessee | 6 | – | 2 | 9 | – | 3 |
| No. 16 Georgia | 5 | – | 3 | 8 | – | 4 |
| Kentucky | 4 | – | 4 | 6 | – | 6 |
| Vanderbilt | 2 | – | 6 | 5 | – | 6 |
| South Carolina | 0 | – | 8 | 0 | – | 11 |
Western Division
| No. 8 Alabama x$ | 7 | – | 1 | 10 | – | 3 |
| No. 13 Mississippi State | 6 | – | 2 | 10 | – | 2 |
| No. 22 Ole Miss | 4 | – | 4 | 8 | – | 4 |
| No. 17 Arkansas | 4 | – | 4 | 8 | – | 4 |
| Auburn | 2 | – | 6 | 5 | – | 6 |
| LSU | 1 | – | 7 | 3 | – | 8 |
Championship: Alabama 34, Florida 7
$ – BCS representative as conference champion; x – Division champion/co-champions; Rankings from AP Poll

The 1999 South Carolina Gamecocks football team represented the University of South Carolina as a member of the Eastern Division of the Southeastern Conference (SEC) during the 1999 NCAA Division I-A football season. Led by first-year head coach Lou Holtz, the Gamecocks compiled an overall record of 0–11 with a mark of 0–8 in conference play, placing last out of six teams in the SEC's Eastern Division. The team played home games at Williams–Brice Stadium in Columbia, South Carolina.

South Carolina's record of 0–11 surpassing the previous season's mark of 1–10 as the worst season record in program history. This was the Gamecocks' first winless season since 1897. South Carolina finished the 1990s with a 41–67–3 record.

== Schedule ==
| Date | Time | Opponent | Site | TV | Result | Attendance | Source |
|---|---|---|---|---|---|---|---|
| September 4 | 7:30 pm | at No. 24 NC State* | Carter–Finley Stadium; Raleigh, NC | ESPN | L 0–10 | 51,500 | |
| September 11 | 5:00 pm | at No. 12 Georgia | Sanford Stadium; Athens, GA (rivalry) | ESPN2 | L 9–24 | 86,117 | |
| September 18 | 7:00 pm | East Carolina* | Williams–Brice Stadium; Columbia, SC | | L 3–21 | 82,605 | |
| September 25 | 7:00 pm | at No. 23 Mississippi State | Scott Field; Starkville, MS | | L 0–17 | 37,693 | |
| October 2 | 7:00 pm | Ole Miss | Williams–Brice Stadium; Columbia, SC | PPV | L 10–36 | 81,600 | |
| October 9 | 1:00 pm | Kentucky | Williams–Brice Stadium; Columbia, SC | PPV | L 10–30 | 73,150 | |
| October 16 | 7:00 pm | at Arkansas | War Memorial Stadium; Little Rock, AR | | L 14–48 | 55,123 | |
| October 23 | 7:00 pm | Vanderbilt^{†} | Williams–Brice Stadium; Columbia, SC | | L 10–11 | 74,806 | |
| October 30 | 1:00 pm | at No. 4 Tennessee | Neyland Stadium; Knoxville, TN (rivalry) | CSS | L 7–30 | 105,941 | |
| November 13 | 12:30 pm | No. 4 Florida | Williams–Brice Stadium; Columbia, SC | JPS | L 3–20 | 73,951 | |
| November 20 | 12:30 pm | Clemson* | Williams–Brice Stadium; Columbia, SC (rivalry) | JPS | L 21–31 | 83,523 | |
*Non-conference game; ^{†}Homecoming; Rankings from AP Poll released prior to the game; All times are in Eastern time

== Roster ==
1999 South Carolina Gamecocks football team roster
Players
Coaches
Offense

| Pos. | # | Name | Class |
|---|---|---|---|
| RB | 4 | Boo Williams | Sr |
| QB | | Erik Kimrey | So |

Defense

| Pos. | # | Name | Class |
|---|---|---|---|
| DB | 3 | Ray Green | Sr |
| CB | 24 | Sheldon Brown | So |
| CB | 35 | André Goodman | So |
| DE | 55 | Kalimba Edwards | So |
| DT | 90 | Errol Rochester | Sr |
| DE | 91 | John Stamper | So |
| DL | 92 | C.J. Frye | Fr |
| DE | 93 | Dennis Quinn | Fr |
| DE | 94 | Matt Marsters | Sr |

Special teams

| Pos. | # | Name | Class |

Head coach

- Lou Holtz

Coordinators/assistant coaches

- Skip Holtz
  (Offensive coordinator/quarterbacks)
- Charlie Strong
  (Defensive coordinator/defensive backs)
- Chris Cosh
  (Linebackers)
- Oliver Pough
  (Running backs)
- Jon Michael Fabris
  (Defensive line)
- Todd Fitch
  (Wide receivers)
- John Gutekunst
  (Defensive backs)

Legend

- (C) Team captain
- (S) Suspended
- (I) Ineligible
- Injured
- Redshirt

Roster
Last update: 1999-10-17

== Game summaries ==
=== At No. 24 NC State ===
| | 1 | 2 | 3 | 4 | Total |
|---|---|---|---|---|---|
| Gamecocks | 0 | 0 | 0 | 0 | 0 |
| No. 24 Wolfpack | 0 | 3 | 0 | 7 | 10 |

| Statistics | SC | NCST |
|---|---|---|
| First downs | 11 | 6 |
| Total yards | 232 | 96 |
| Rushes–yards | 53–153 | 38–78 |
| Passing yards | 79 | 18 |
| Passing: comp–att–int | 5–18–1 | 3–7–0 |
| Turnovers | 5 | 3 |

| Team | Category | Player | Statistics |
|---|---|---|---|
| South Carolina | Passing | Phil Petty | 4/10, 70 yards, INT |
| South Carolina | Rushing | Derek Watson | 15 rushes, 118 yards |
| South Carolina | Receiving | Antione Nesmith | 1 reception, 47 yards |
| NC State | Passing | Jamie Barnette | 3/7, 18 yards |
| NC State | Rushing | Ray Robinson | 15 rushes, 71 yards |
| NC State | Receiving | Ryan Hamrick | 1 reception, 13 yards |

=== At No. 12 Georgia ===
| | 1 | 2 | 3 | 4 | Total |
|---|---|---|---|---|---|
| Gamecocks | 0 | 0 | 3 | 6 | 9 |
| No. 12 Bulldogs | 0 | 14 | 3 | 7 | 24 |

| Statistics | SC | UGA |
|---|---|---|
| First downs | 12 | 21 |
| Total yards | 218 | 431 |
| Rushes–yards | 30–46 | 43–180 |
| Passing yards | 172 | 251 |
| Passing: comp–att–int | 12–28–2 | 21–38–0 |
| Turnovers | 2 | 1 |

| Team | Category | Player | Statistics |
|---|---|---|---|
| South Carolina | Passing | Phil Petty | 12/28, 172 yards, TD, 2 INT |
| South Carolina | Rushing | Derek Watson | 10 rushes, 29 yards |
| South Carolina | Receiving | Kerry Hood | 3 receptions, 72 yards |
| Georgia | Passing | Quincy Carter | 21/38, 251 yards, TD |
| Georgia | Rushing | Jasper Sanks | 22 rushes, 130 yards, TD |
| Georgia | Receiving | Terrence Edwards | 7 receptions, 90 yards, TD |

=== East Carolina ===
| | 1 | 2 | 3 | 4 | Total |
|---|---|---|---|---|---|
| Pirates | 7 | 0 | 7 | 7 | 21 |
| Gamecocks | 3 | 0 | 0 | 0 | 3 |

| Statistics | ECU | SC |
|---|---|---|
| First downs | 15 | 20 |
| Total yards | 274 | 302 |
| Rushes–yards | 40–192 | 41–129 |
| Passing yards | 82 | 173 |
| Passing: comp–att–int | 10–21–0 | 14–35–3 |
| Turnovers | 1 | 4 |

| Team | Category | Player | Statistics |
|---|---|---|---|
| East Carolina | Passing | David Garrard | 10/19, 82 yards, TD |
| East Carolina | Rushing | Jamie Wilson | 21 rushes, 145 yards |
| East Carolina | Receiving | Corey Floyd | 3 receptions, 25 yards, TD |
| South Carolina | Passing | Phil Petty | 12/31, 134 yards, 3 INT |
| South Carolina | Rushing | Derek Watson | 17 rushes, 69 yards |
| South Carolina | Receiving | Jermale Kelly | 3 receptions, 42 yards |

=== At No. 23 Mississippi State ===
| | 1 | 2 | 3 | 4 | Total |
|---|---|---|---|---|---|
| Gamecocks | 0 | 0 | 0 | 0 | 0 |
| No. 23 Bulldogs | 3 | 7 | 7 | 0 | 17 |

| Statistics | SC | MSST |
|---|---|---|
| First downs | 20 | 9 |
| Total yards | 296 | 181 |
| Rushes–yards | 50–116 | 31–88 |
| Passing yards | 180 | 93 |
| Passing: comp–att–int | 13–28–2 | 9–16–0 |
| Turnovers | 2 | 0 |

| Team | Category | Player | Statistics |
|---|---|---|---|
| South Carolina | Passing | Phil Petty | 7/14, 96 yards, INT |
| South Carolina | Rushing | Derek Watson | 23 rushes, 70 yards |
| South Carolina | Receiving | Jermale Kelly | 5 receptions, 78 yards |
| Mississippi State | Passing | Wayne Madkin | 9/16, 93 yards, TD |
| Mississippi State | Rushing | Chris Rainey | 13 rushes, 45 yards |
| Mississippi State | Receiving | Kelvin Love | 3 receptions, 35 yards, TD |

=== Ole Miss ===
| | 1 | 2 | 3 | 4 | Total |
|---|---|---|---|---|---|
| Rebels | 3 | 21 | 10 | 2 | 36 |
| Gamecocks | 0 | 7 | 3 | 0 | 10 |

| Statistics | MISS | SC |
|---|---|---|
| First downs | 18 | 10 |
| Total yards | 393 | 163 |
| Rushes–yards | 43–248 | 36–16 |
| Passing yards | 145 | 147 |
| Passing: comp–att–int | 13–16–0 | 8–15–0 |
| Turnovers | 1 | 2 |

| Team | Category | Player | Statistics |
|---|---|---|---|
| Ole Miss | Passing | Romaro Miller | 9/12, 129 yards, TD |
| Ole Miss | Rushing | Joe Gunn | 16 rushes, 127 yards |
| Ole Miss | Receiving | Jamie Armstrong | 2 receptions, 50 yards, TD |
| South Carolina | Passing | Mikal Goodman | 8/15, 147 yards |
| South Carolina | Rushing | Andrew Pinnock | 8 rushes, 16 yards |
| South Carolina | Receiving | Jermale Kelly | 4 receptions, 79 yards |

=== Kentucky ===
| | 1 | 2 | 3 | 4 | Total |
|---|---|---|---|---|---|
| Wildcats | 3 | 17 | 7 | 3 | 30 |
| Gamecocks | 3 | 0 | 0 | 7 | 10 |

| Statistics | UK | SC |
|---|---|---|
| First downs | 24 | 9 |
| Total yards | 337 | 233 |
| Rushes–yards | 39–74 | 30–55 |
| Passing yards | 263 | 178 |
| Passing: comp–att–int | 23–35–1 | 7–19–2 |
| Turnovers | 3 | 4 |

| Team | Category | Player | Statistics |
|---|---|---|---|
| Kentucky | Passing | Dusty Bonner | 23/35, 263 yards, TD, INT |
| Kentucky | Rushing | Derek Homer | 20 rushes, 86 yards |
| Kentucky | Receiving | James Whalen | 9 receptions, 119 yards |
| South Carolina | Passing | Mikal Goodman | 6/13, 181 yards, TD, INT |
| South Carolina | Rushing | Andrew Pinnock | 6 rushes, 37 yards |
| South Carolina | Receiving | Kerry Hood | 2 receptions, 100 yards, TD |

=== At Arkansas ===
| | 1 | 2 | 3 | 4 | Total |
|---|---|---|---|---|---|
| Gamecocks | 0 | 7 | 0 | 7 | 14 |
| Razorbacks | 24 | 7 | 14 | 3 | 48 |

| Statistics | SC | ARK |
|---|---|---|
| First downs | 14 | 20 |
| Total yards | 180 | 346 |
| Rushes–yards | 41–102 | 37–171 |
| Passing yards | 78 | 175 |
| Passing: comp–att–int | 10–31–3 | 14–19–2 |
| Turnovers | 5 | 3 |

| Team | Category | Player | Statistics |
|---|---|---|---|
| South Carolina | Passing | Kevin Sides | 6/25, 48 yards, 3 INT |
| South Carolina | Rushing | Andrew Pinnock | 12 rushes, 31 yards |
| South Carolina | Receiving | Kerry Hood | 3 receptions, 33 yards |
| Arkansas | Passing | Clint Stoerner | 13/16, 168 yards, 3 TD, 2 INT |
| Arkansas | Rushing | Chrys Chukwuma | 13 rushes, 59 yards, TD |
| Arkansas | Receiving | Michael Williams | 4 receptions, 38 yards, TD |

=== Vanderbilt ===
| | 1 | 2 | 3 | 4 | Total |
|---|---|---|---|---|---|
| Commodores | 0 | 3 | 0 | 8 | 11 |
| Gamecocks | 0 | 3 | 5 | 2 | 10 |

| Statistics | VAN | SC |
|---|---|---|
| First downs | 11 | 10 |
| Total yards | 189 | 163 |
| Rushes–yards | 33–86 | 36–95 |
| Passing yards | 103 | 68 |
| Passing: comp–att–int | 9–19–2 | 9–22–2 |
| Turnovers | 3 | 2 |

| Team | Category | Player | Statistics |
|---|---|---|---|
| Vanderbilt | Passing | Greg Zolman | 9/17, 103 yards, TD, 2 INT |
| Vanderbilt | Rushing | Rodney Williams | 18 rushes, 96 yards |
| Vanderbilt | Receiving | Elliott Carson | 3 receptions, 50 yards |
| South Carolina | Passing | Kyle Crabb | 6/17, 37 yards, INT |
| South Carolina | Rushing | Andrew Pinnock | 11 rushes, 56 yards |
| South Carolina | Receiving | Jermale Kelly | 2 receptions, 26 yards |

=== At No. 4 Tennessee ===
| | 1 | 2 | 3 | 4 | Total |
|---|---|---|---|---|---|
| Gamecocks | 0 | 0 | 0 | 7 | 7 |
| No. 4 Volunteers | 7 | 13 | 3 | 7 | 30 |

| Statistics | SC | TENN |
|---|---|---|
| First downs | 11 | 17 |
| Total yards | 225 | 413 |
| Rushes–yards | 42–103 | 36–176 |
| Passing yards | 122 | 237 |
| Passing: comp–att–int | 8–17–1 | 12–24–1 |
| Turnovers | 1 | 3 |

| Team | Category | Player | Statistics |
|---|---|---|---|
| South Carolina | Passing | Mikal Goodman | 7/14, 121 yards, TD |
| South Carolina | Rushing | Carlos Spikes | 4 rushes, 29 yards |
| South Carolina | Receiving | Ben Fleming | 3 receptions, 79 yards, TD |
| Tennessee | Passing | Tee Martin | 11/23, 216 yards, TD, INT |
| Tennessee | Rushing | Jamal Lewis | 14 rushes, 146 yards, TD |
| Tennessee | Receiving | Donté Stallworth | 4 receptions, 130 yards |

=== No. 4 Florida ===
| | 1 | 2 | 3 | 4 | Total |
|---|---|---|---|---|---|
| No. 4 Gators | 3 | 7 | 7 | 3 | 20 |
| Gamecocks | 0 | 3 | 0 | 0 | 3 |

| Statistics | FLA | SC |
|---|---|---|
| First downs | 18 | 11 |
| Total yards | 300 | 251 |
| Rushes–yards | 34–139 | 35–87 |
| Passing yards | 161 | 164 |
| Passing: comp–att–int | 15–33–1 | 15–32–0 |
| Turnovers | 1 | 0 |

| Team | Category | Player | Statistics |
|---|---|---|---|
| Florida | Passing | Jesse Palmer | 15/33, 161 yards, TD, INT |
| Florida | Rushing | Earnest Graham | 24 rushes, 105 yards, TD |
| Florida | Receiving | Darrell Jackson | 4 receptions, 45 yards, TD |
| South Carolina | Passing | Phil Petty | 15/31, 164 yards |
| South Carolina | Rushing | Ryan Brewer | 10 rushes, 75 yards |
| South Carolina | Receiving | Ryan Brewer | 5 receptions, 45 yards |

=== Clemson ===
| | 1 | 2 | 3 | 4 | Total |
|---|---|---|---|---|---|
| Tigers | 0 | 17 | 14 | 0 | 31 |
| Gamecocks | 3 | 9 | 9 | 0 | 21 |

| Statistics | CLEM | SC |
|---|---|---|
| First downs | 20 | 18 |
| Total yards | 425 | 252 |
| Rushes–yards | 38–176 | 40–85 |
| Passing yards | 249 | 167 |
| Passing: comp–att–int | 14–27–1 | 15–32–0 |
| Turnovers | 2 | 0 |

| Team | Category | Player | Statistics |
|---|---|---|---|
| Clemson | Passing | Woodrow Dantzler | 14/26, 249 yards, 2 TD, INT |
| Clemson | Rushing | Travis Zachery | 17 rushes, 105 yards, 2 TD |
| Clemson | Receiving | Rod Gardner | 6 receptions, 138 yards, 2 TD |
| South Carolina | Passing | Phil Petty | 15/32, 167 yards |
| South Carolina | Rushing | Andrew Pinnock | 18 rushes, 76 yards, 2 TD |
| South Carolina | Receiving | Brian Scott | 3 receptions, 59 yards |
