= 1999 LSU Tigers football team =

American college football season

1999 LSU Tigers football
- Conference: Southeastern Conference
- Western Division
- Record: 3–8 (1–7 SEC)
- Head coach: Gerry DiNardo (5th season; first 10 games); Hal Hunter (interim, final game)
- Offensive coordinator: Bob McConnell (1st season)
- Offensive scheme: Multiple
- Defensive coordinator: Lou Tepper (2nd season)
- Base defense: 3–4
- Home stadium: Tiger Stadium

1999 Southeastern Conference football standings
	Conf.			Overall
Team	W		L	W		L
Eastern Division
No. 12 Florida x	7	–	1	9	–	4
No. 9 Tennessee	6	–	2	9	–	3
No. 16 Georgia	5	–	3	8	–	4
Kentucky	4	–	4	6	–	6
Vanderbilt	2	–	6	5	–	6
South Carolina	0	–	8	0	–	11
Western Division
No. 8 Alabama x$	7	–	1	10	–	3
No. 13 Mississippi State	6	–	2	10	–	2
No. 22 Ole Miss	4	–	4	8	–	4
No. 17 Arkansas	4	–	4	8	–	4
Auburn	2	–	6	5	–	6
LSU	1	–	7	3	–	8
Championship: Alabama 34, Florida 7
$ – BCS representative as conference champion; x – Division champion/co-champions; Rankings from AP Poll

The 1999 LSU Tigers football team represented Louisiana State University in the 1999 NCAA Division I-A football season. Coached by Gerry DiNardo in his last year at LSU, the Tigers played their home games at Tiger Stadium in Baton Rouge, Louisiana. LSU fired DiNardo before the final game of the season against conference opponent Arkansas after eight consecutive losses and named Assistant Coach Hal Hunter as interim head coach for the final game. DiNardo was given the opportunity to coach the game vs. Arkansas, but refused (in contrast to his predecessors at LSU, Curley Hallman, who coached the Tigers in their final two games of 1994 after being fired five years to the day prior to DiNardo's dismissal; and Mike Archer, who coached the final two games of 1990 after resigning four years to the day before Hallman's sacking).

In Hunter's only game as the team's head coach, unranked LSU (2–8, 0–7) dominated No. 17 Arkansas (7–3, 4–3) in their lone conference victory over of the season, and won back the Golden Boot. Former Michigan State University head football coach Nick Saban, whose team DiNardo's Tigers defeated in the 1995 Independence Bowl, accepted LSU's offer and took over the team on November 30.

This was LSU's last losing season until 2021.

== Schedule ==
Date	Time	Opponent	Site	TV	Result	Attendance	Source
September 4	7:00 p.m.	San Jose State*	Tiger Stadium; Baton Rouge, LA		W 29–21	76,753	
September 11	7:00 p.m.	North Texas*^{†}	Tiger Stadium; Baton Rouge, LA		W 52–0	79,845	
September 18	4:00 p.m.	Auburn	Tiger Stadium; Baton Rouge, LA (rivalry)	ESPN	L 7–41	80,562	
October 2	11:30 a.m.	at No. 10 Georgia	Sanford Stadium; Athens, GA	JPS	L 22–23	86,117	
October 9	2:30 p.m.	No. 8 Florida	Tiger Stadium; Baton Rouge, LA (rivalry)	CBS	L 10–31	80,255	
October 16	11:30 a.m.	at Kentucky	Commonwealth Stadium; Lexington, KY	JPS	L 5–31	67,370	
October 23	5:00 p.m.	at No. 12 Mississippi State	Scott Field; Starkville, MS (rivalry)	ESPN2	L 16–17	41,274	
October 30	7:00 p.m.	No. 25 Ole Miss	Tiger Stadium; Baton Rouge, LA (rivalry)		L 23–42	80,084	
November 6	11:30 a.m.	at No. 12 Alabama	Bryant–Denny Stadium; Tuscaloosa, AL (rivalry)	JPS	L 17–23	83,818	
November 13	7:00 p.m.	Houston*	Tiger Stadium; Baton Rouge, LA		L 7–20	76,671	
November 26	1:30 p.m.	No. 17 Arkansas	Tiger Stadium; Baton Rouge, LA (rivalry)	CBS	W 35–10	77,610	
*Non-conference game; ^{†}Homecoming; Rankings from AP Poll released prior to the game; All times are in Central time

== Roster ==
1999 LSU Tigers football team roster
Players
Coaches
Offense

Pos.	#	Name	Class
WR	3	Jerel Myers	Fr
FL	4	Reggie Robinson	So
QB	6	Rohan Davey	So
RB	7	Rondell Mealey	Sr
FL	10	LaVar Johnson	So
QB	13	Will Stelly	Fr
QB	14	Josh Booty	So
QB	16	Craig Nall	So
WR	22	Larry Foster	Sr
WR	25	Josh Reed	So
RB	26	Elice Parker	Fr
F-B	30	Solomon Lee	Fr
RB	31	Domanick Davis	Fr
SE	37	Blain Bech	Fr
FL	38	Andy Stroup	Sr
FB	39	Reese Angelette	Fr
SE	39	Roger Williams	Jr
RB	41	LaBrandon Toefield	Fr
FB	43	Tommy Banks	Jr
G	44	Travis Bourgeois	Fr
TE	47	Eric Edwards	Fr
DS	50	Brandon Peterson	Fr
C	56	Jason Cuevas	Fr
DS	57	Wendell York	Fr
OL	60	Rodney Reed	Fr
OT	61	Sam Forehand	Fr
OT	63	Tim Donelon	Sr
C	64	John Compton	Jr
OT	65	Jason Daire	Fr
G	66	John Young	Fr
C	67	Alvin Puckett	Jr
OT	68	Brandon Winey	Jr
G	69	Jason Baggett	So
OT	70	Louis Williams	Jr
G	71	Alcender Jackson	Sr
OT	72	Nick Dupuis	Fr
G	73	Rob Sale	Fr
OT	74	Brad Smalling	Fr
OT	75	Trey Langley	Jr
G	76	Bob Wynne	Fr
C	77	Jonathan Autrey	Fr
G	78	Dwayne Pierce	Jr
C	79	Jason Underwood	So
TE	81	Jamal Pack	Sr
FL	82	Mike Fontenot	Fr
F-B	82	Michael Lillie	Jr
TE	85	Kyle Kipps	So
TE	86	Robert Royal	Fr
TE	87	Joe Domingeaux	So
SE	88	Abram Booty	Jr
FL	89	Ed Dangerfield	So
TE	90	Terry Phillips	Fr
F-B	92	Bryce Wyatt	Fr

Defense

Pos.	#	Name	Class
CB	1	Fred Booker	Jr
DB	2	Ryan Clark	So
FS	5	Damien James	Fr
CB	8	Mark Roman	Sr
CB	9	Robert Davis	So
LB	11	Bradie James	Fr
LB	13	Kyle Thompson	Fr
LB	15	Walter Moreham	So
LB	17	Bubba Alexander	Jr
SS	18	Clarence LeBlanc	Sr
FS	19	Shane O'Toole	So
SS	21	Matthew Curtis	Fr
CB	24	Oliver Smith	Fr
CB	27	Damien Woods	Sr
LB	28	Lionel Thomas	So
LB	29	Terrence O'Bryant	So
LB	32	Jeremy Lawrence	Fr
DB	33	Demetrius Hookfin	Fr
LB	34	Trev Faulk	Fr
CB	34	Tony Vastola	So
LB	35	Charles Smith	Sr
DB	36	Norman LeJeune	Fr
LB	42	Chris Cooper	Fr
LB	45	Jamal Hill	Jr
LB	46	Wardell Sykes	Jr
FS	48	Deryell Patterson	Fr
LB	51	Jason Green	So
ILB	52	Thomas Dunson	So
DE	54	Kenderick Allen	So
DT	55	Willie Gray	Fr
LB	58	Derace James	Fr
DE	59	Jarvis Green	So
LB	62	Lance Rickner	Fr
LB	63	Ryan O'Neal	Fr
NG	91	Muskingum Barnes	So
LB	93	Theo Williams	Sr
DT	94	Melvin Richey	Fr
DT	95	Johnny Mitchell	Sr
DT	96	Byron Dawson	So
DE	97	Kareem Mitchell	Jr
DT	98	Shaun Wynn	Fr
DE	99	Charles Thomas	So
NG	99	Trevor Hill	Fr

Special teams

Pos.	#	Name	Class
K	12	Kris Kessler	So
K	13	Chad Lewis	Fr
P	23	Jeremy Witten	Sr
P	26	Corey Gibbs	Sr
K	40	John Corbello	Fr
P	80	Donnie Jones	Fr
P	82	Billy Dressler	Jr
K	83	Danny Boyd	Sr
K	84	Michael Mitchell	Sr

Head coach

- Gerry DiNardo (first 10 games)
- Hal Hunter (last game)

Coordinators/assistant coaches

- Bob McConnell – Offensive coordinator/wide receivers
- Michael Haywood – Running backs
- David Kelly – Tight ends
- Hal Hunter – Offensive line
- Lou Tepper – Defensive coordinator/inside linebacker
- Joe Cullen – Defensive line
- Kenny Carter – Linebackers
- Bill Elias Jr. – Outside linebackers
- Steve Bernstein – Defensive backs
- Charlie Coiner – Special teams coordinator

Legend

- (C) Team captain
- (S) Suspended
- (I) Ineligible
- Injured
- Redshirt

Roster
