= 1999 Tennessee Volunteers football team =

American college football season

1999 Tennessee Volunteers football

Fiesta Bowl, L 21–31 vs. Nebraska
- Conference: Southeastern Conference
- Eastern Division

Ranking
- Coaches: No. 9
- AP: No. 9
- Record: 9–3 (6–2 SEC)
- Head coach: Phillip Fulmer (7th season)
- Offensive coordinator: Randy Sanders (1st season)
- Offensive scheme: Pro-style
- Defensive coordinator: John Chavis (5th season)
- Base defense: Multiple 4–3
- Captains: Chad Clifton; Dwayne Goodrich; Tee Martin; Billy Ratliff; Spencer Riley; Darwin Walker
- Home stadium: Neyland Stadium

1999 Southeastern Conference football standings
	Conf.			Overall
Team	W		L	W		L
Eastern Division
No. 12 Florida x	7	–	1	9	–	4
No. 9 Tennessee	6	–	2	9	–	3
No. 16 Georgia	5	–	3	8	–	4
Kentucky	4	–	4	6	–	6
Vanderbilt	2	–	6	5	–	6
South Carolina	0	–	8	0	–	11
Western Division
No. 8 Alabama x$	7	–	1	10	–	3
No. 13 Mississippi State	6	–	2	10	–	2
No. 22 Ole Miss	4	–	4	8	–	4
No. 17 Arkansas	4	–	4	8	–	4
Auburn	2	–	6	5	–	6
LSU	1	–	7	3	–	8
Championship: Alabama 34, Florida 7
$ – BCS representative as conference champion; x – Division champion/co-champions; Rankings from AP Poll

The 1999 Tennessee Volunteers football team represented the University of Tennessee as a member of the Eastern Division of the Southeastern Conference (SEC) during the 1999 NCAA Division I-A football season. Led by seventh-year head coach Phillip Fulmer, the Volunteers compiled an overall record of 9–3 with a mark of 6–2, placing second in the SEC's Eastern Division. Tennessee was invited to the Fiesta Bowl, where the Volunteers lost to Nebraska. The team played home games at Neyland Stadium in Knoxville, Tennessee.

The Volunteers offense scored 369 points while the defense allowed 194 points. After securing an undefeated national championship in the previous season, Tennessee lost to SEC East rival Florida, and saw Arkansas get revenge for the Razorbacks' loss in Knoxville in 1998, beating the Vols by exactly the same score of 28–24.

== Schedule ==
Date	Time	Opponent	Rank	Site	TV	Result	Attendance	Source
September 4	7:00 pm	Wyoming*	No. 3	Neyland Stadium; Knoxville, TN	ESPN2	W 42–17	107,597	
September 18	8:00 pm	at No. 4 Florida	No. 2	Ben Hill Griffin Stadium; Gainesville, FL (rivalry, College GameDay)	CBS	L 21–23	85,707	
September 25	4:00 pm	Memphis*^{†}	No. 7	Neyland Stadium; Knoxville, TN	PPV	W 17–16	107,261	
October 2	7:45 pm	Auburn	No. 7	Neyland Stadium; Knoxville, TN (rivalry)	ESPN	W 24–0	106,424	
October 9	7:00 pm	No. 10 Georgia	No. 6	Neyland Stadium; Knoxville, TN (rivalry)	ESPN	W 37–20	107,247	
October 23	3:30 pm	at No. 10 Alabama	No. 5	Bryant–Denny Stadium; Tuscaloosa, AL (Third Saturday in October)	CBS	W 21–7	86,869	
October 30	1:00 pm	South Carolina	No. 4	Neyland Stadium; Knoxville, TN	PPV	W 30–7	105,941	
November 6	7:45 pm	No. 24 Notre Dame*	No. 4	Neyland Stadium; Knoxville, TN (College GameDay)	ESPN	W 38–14	107,619	
November 13	12:30 pm	at Arkansas	No. 3	Razorback Stadium; Fayetteville, AR	JPS	L 24–28	52,815	
November 20	12:30 pm	at Kentucky	No. 7	Commonwealth Stadium; Lexington, KY (rivalry)	JPS	W 56–21	71,022	
November 27	12:00 pm	Vanderbilt	No. 6	Neyland Stadium; Knoxville, TN (rivalry)	CBS	W 38–10	105,781	
January 2	8:00 pm	vs. No. 3 Nebraska*	No. 6	Sun Devil Stadium; Tempe, AZ (Fiesta Bowl)	ABC	L 21–31	71,526	
*Non-conference game; ^{†}Homecoming; Rankings from AP Poll released prior to the game; All times are in Eastern time

== Rankings ==
Ranking movements Legend: ██ Increase in ranking ██ Decrease in ranking ( ) = First-place votes
	Week																
Poll	Pre	1	2	3	4	5	6	7	8	9	10	11	12	13	14	15	Final
AP	2 (15)	3 (13)	3 (11)	2 (13)	7	7	6	6	5	4	4	3	7	6	6	6	9
Coaches	2 (13)	2^	3	2 (8)	7	8	6	5	5	4	4	3 (1)	7	6	6	5	9
BCS	Not released									4	5	2	5	4	5	5	Not released

== Roster ==
1999 Tennessee Volunteers football team roster
Players
Coaches
Offense

Pos.	#	Name	Class
WR	14	Cedrick Wilson Sr.	Sr
QB	17	Tee Martin	Sr
RB	20	Travis Henry	Sr
RB	31	Jamal Lewis	Jr
G	52	Cosey Coleman	Jr
G	53	Toby Champion	Jr
C	55	Clay Bostic	So
OT	67	Chad Clifton	Sr
G	70	Fred Weary	So
OT	71	Reggie Coleman	So
WR	80	Eric Parker	So
TE	84	Neil Johnson	Jr
WR	87	David Martin	Jr

Defense

Pos.	#	Name	Class
DB	7	Deon Grant	Jr
DB	23	Dwayne Goodrich	Sr
LB	28	Dominique Stevenson	Jr
DB	29	Mikki Allen	Sr
DB	30	Andre Lott	Jr
LB	46	Raynoch Thompson	Sr
LB	47	Matt Blankenship	Sr
LB	56	Bernard Jackson	So
DE	90	Will Overstreet	So
DE	93	Shaun Ellis	Sr

Special teams

Pos.	#	Name	Class

Head coach

- Phillip Fulmer

Coordinators/assistant coaches

- Randy Sanders – Offensive coordinator/quarterbacks
- Woody McCorvey – Running backs
- Pat Washington – Wide receivers
- Mark Bradley – Tight ends/assistant offensive line
- Mike Barry – Offensive line
- John Chavis – Defensive coordinator/linebackers
- Dan Brooks – Defensive line/recruiting coordinator
- Larry Slade – Defensive backs
- Steve Caldwell – Special teams/defensive ends
- Ryan Held – Graduate assistant
- Shawn Quinn – Graduate assistant

Legend

- (C) Team captain
- (S) Suspended
- (I) Ineligible
- Injured
- Redshirt

Roster

== Team players drafted into the NFL ==
The Tennessee Volunteers had nine players selected in the 2000 NFL draft.

Player	Position	Round	Pick	NFL club
Jamal Lewis	Running back	1	5	Baltimore Ravens
Shaun Ellis	Defensive end	1	12	New York Jets
Raynoch Thompson	Linebacker	2	41	Arizona Cardinals
Chad Clifton	Tackle	2	44	Green Bay Packers
Dwayne Goodrich	Defensive back	2	49	Dallas Cowboys
Cosey Coleman	Guard	2	51	Tampa Bay Buccaneers
Deon Grant	Defensive back	2	57	Carolina Panthers
Darwin Walker	Defensive tackle	3	71	Arizona Cardinals
Tee Martin	Quarterback	5	163	Pittsburgh Steelers
