= 1999 Ole Miss Rebels football team =

American college football season

1999 Ole Miss Rebels football

Independence Bowl champion

Independence Bowl, W 27–25 vs. Oklahoma
- Conference: Southeastern Conference
- Western Division

Ranking
- Coaches: No. 22
- AP: No. 22
- Record: 8–4 (4–4 SEC)
- Head coach: David Cutcliffe (1st season)
- Offensive scheme: Pro-style
- Defensive coordinator: Art Kaufman (5th season)
- Base defense: 4–3
- Home stadium: Vaught–Hemingway Stadium

1999 Southeastern Conference football standings
	Conf.			Overall
Team	W		L	W		L
Eastern Division
No. 12 Florida x	7	–	1	9	–	4
No. 9 Tennessee	6	–	2	9	–	3
No. 16 Georgia	5	–	3	8	–	4
Kentucky	4	–	4	6	–	6
Vanderbilt	2	–	6	5	–	6
South Carolina	0	–	8	0	–	11
Western Division
No. 8 Alabama x$	7	–	1	10	–	3
No. 13 Mississippi State	6	–	2	10	–	2
No. 22 Ole Miss	4	–	4	8	–	4
No. 17 Arkansas	4	–	4	8	–	4
Auburn	2	–	6	5	–	6
LSU	1	–	7	3	–	8
Championship: Alabama 34, Florida 7
$ – BCS representative as conference champion; x – Division champion/co-champions; Rankings from AP Poll

The 1999 Ole Miss Rebels football team represented the University of Mississippi during the 1999 NCAA Division I-A football season. They participated as members of the Southeastern Conference in the West Division. Coached by David Cutcliffe, the Rebels played their home games at Vaught–Hemingway Stadium in Oxford, Mississippi.

== Schedule ==
Date	Time	Opponent	Rank	Site	TV	Result	Attendance	Source
September 4	7:00 pm	at Memphis*		Liberty Bowl Memorial Stadium; Memphis, TN (rivalry)		W 3–0	57,523	
September 11	6:00 pm	Arkansas State*		Vaught–Hemingway Stadium; Oxford, MS		W 38–14	44,511	
September 18	11:30 am	Vanderbilt		Vaught–Hemingway Stadium; Oxford, MS (rivalry)	JPS	L 34–37 ^{OT}	41,622	
September 25	11:30 am	at Auburn		Jordan-Hare Stadium; Auburn, AL (rivalry)	JPS	W 24–17 ^{OT}	85,214	
October 2	6:00 pm	at South Carolina		Williams–Brice Stadium; Columbia, SC	PPV	W 36–10	81,600	
October 9	1:00 pm	Tulane*^{†}		Vaught–Hemingway Stadium; Oxford, MS (rivalry)		W 20–13	40,914	
October 16	2:30 pm	No. 11 Alabama	No. 22	Vaught–Hemingway Stadium; Oxford, MS (rivalry)	CBS	L 24–30	52,122	
October 30	7:00 pm	at LSU	No. 25	Tiger Stadium; Baton Rouge, LA (rivalry)	PPV	W 42–23	80,084	
November 6	5:00 pm	No. 24 Arkansas	No. 23	Vaught–Hemingway Stadium; Oxford, MS (rivalry)	ESPN2	W 38–16	50,928	
November 20	5:00 pm	No. 21 Georgia	No. 16	Vaught–Hemingway Stadium; Oxford, MS	ESPN2	L 17–20	50,876	
November 25	7:00 pm	at No. 18 Mississippi State	No. 23	Scott Field; Starkville, MS (Egg Bowl)	ESPN	L 20–23	41,200	
December 31	7:30 pm	vs. Oklahoma*		Independence Stadium; Shreveport, LA (Independence Bowl)	ESPN	W 27–25	49,873	
*Non-conference game; ^{†}Homecoming; Rankings from AP Poll released prior to the game; All times are in Central time

== Roster ==
- RB Deuce McAllister, Jr.
