= 1999 Arkansas Razorbacks football team =

American college football season

1999 Arkansas Razorbacks football

Cotton Bowl Classic champion

Cotton Bowl Classic, W 27–6 vs. Texas
- Conference: Southeastern Conference
- Western Division

Ranking
- Coaches: No. 19
- AP: No. 17
- Record: 8–4 (4–4 SEC)
- Head coach: Houston Nutt (2nd season)
- Co-defensive coordinators: Bobby Allen (2nd season); Keith Burns (2nd season)
- Captains: David Barrett; Kenoy Kennedy; Anthony Lucas; Clint Stoerner
- Home stadium: Razorback Stadium; War Memorial Stadium

1999 Southeastern Conference football standings
	Conf.			Overall
Team	W		L	W		L
Eastern Division
No. 12 Florida x	7	–	1	9	–	4
No. 9 Tennessee	6	–	2	9	–	3
No. 16 Georgia	5	–	3	8	–	4
Kentucky	4	–	4	6	–	6
Vanderbilt	2	–	6	5	–	6
South Carolina	0	–	8	0	–	11
Western Division
No. 8 Alabama x$	7	–	1	10	–	3
No. 13 Mississippi State	6	–	2	10	–	2
No. 22 Ole Miss	4	–	4	8	–	4
No. 17 Arkansas	4	–	4	8	–	4
Auburn	2	–	6	5	–	6
LSU	1	–	7	3	–	8
Championship: Alabama 34, Florida 7
$ – BCS representative as conference champion; x – Division champion/co-champions; Rankings from AP Poll

The 1999 Arkansas Razorbacks football team represented the University of Arkansas as a member of the Western Division of the Southeastern Conference during the 1999 NCAA Division I-A football season. Led by second-year head coach Houston Nutt, the Razorbacks compiled an overall record 8–4 with a mark of 4–4 in conference play, tying for third place in the SEC's Western Division. Arkansas was invited to the Cotton Bowl Classic, where the Razorbacks defeated Texas. The team played home games at Razorback Stadium in Fayetteville, Arkansas and War Memorial Stadium in Little Rock, Arkansas.

Senior quarterback Clint Stoerner became the school's all-time leading passer in most passing categories. Stoerner also redeemed himself versus Tennessee, after fumbling away the ball late in the game in Knoxville in 1998. That fumble led to a Tennessee touchdown that won the game, 28–24. This season, Stoerner threw the game-winning touchdown pass to Anthony Lucas late in the fourth quarter versus the Volunteers in Fayetteville, leading Arkansas to a victory by the same score, 28–24. Razorback fans tore down the goal posts after the win, and carried them to Dickson Street in downtown Fayetteville in celebration. It is considered one of the most memorable games in Razorback football history. Arkansas's win in the Cotton Bowl Classic over Texas on New Year's Day was the program's first bowl game victory since the 1985 Holiday Bowl, and the Razorbacks first Cotton Bowl win since the 1976 Cotton Bowl Classic. Freshman running back Cedric Cobbs was named the Cotton Bowl offensive MVP, and senior defensive lineman D .J. Cooper was named the game's defensive MVP.

== Schedule ==
Date	Time	Opponent	Rank	Site	TV	Result	Attendance	Source
September 4	7:00 pm	at SMU*	No. 18	Cotton Bowl; Dallas, TX	PPV	W 26–0	51,019	
September 18	6:00 pm	Louisiana–Monroe*	No. 15	War Memorial Stadium; Little Rock, AR		W 44–6	55,382	
September 25	2:30 pm	at Alabama	No. 14	Bryant–Denny Stadium; Tuscaloosa, AL	CBS	L 28–35	83,818	
October 2	12:30 pm	at Kentucky	No. 20	Commonwealth Stadium; Lexington, KY	PPV	L 20–31	62,606	
October 9	6:00 pm	Middle Tennessee*		Razorback Stadium; Fayetteville, AR		W 58–6	51,896	
October 16	6:00 pm	South Carolina		War Memorial Stadium; Little Rock, AR		W 48–14	55,123	
October 30	11:30 am	Auburn^{†}		Razorback Stadium; Fayetteville, AR	JPS	W 34–10	51,133	
November 6	5:05 pm	at No. 23 Ole Miss		Vaught–Hemingway Stadium; Oxford, MS (rivalry)	ESPN2	L 16–38	50,928	
November 13	11:30 am	No. 3 Tennessee		Razorback Stadium; Fayetteville, AR	JPS	W 28–24	52,815	
November 20	8:00 pm	No. 12 Mississippi State	No. 22	War Memorial Stadium; Little Rock, AR	ESPN2	W 14–9	55,491	
November 26	1:30 pm	at LSU	No. 17	Tiger Stadium; Baton Rouge, LA (rivalry)	CBS	L 10–35	77,160	
January 1	10:15 am	vs. No. 14 Texas*	No. 24	Cotton Bowl; Dallas, TX (Cotton Bowl Classic, rivalry)	FOX	W 27–6	72,723	
*Non-conference game; ^{†}Homecoming; Rankings from AP Poll released prior to the game; All times are in Central time

== Rankings ==
Ranking movements Legend: ██ Increase in ranking ██ Decrease in ranking — = Not ranked
	Week																
Poll	Pre	1	2	3	4	5	6	7	8	9	10	11	12	13	14	15	Final
AP	22	18	15	15	14	20	—	—	—	—	—	—	22	17	24	24	17
Coaches	22	22*	17	15	14	18	—	—	—	—	24	—	24	22	—	—	19
BCS	Not released									—	—	—	—	—	—	—	Not released

== Roster ==
1999 Arkansas Razorbacks football team roster
Players
Coaches
Offense

Pos.	#	Name	Class
RB	4	Cedric Cobbs	Fr
QB	14	Clint Stoerner	Sr
RB	22	Chrys Chukwuma	Jr
OT	69	Bobbie Williams	Sr
SE	80	Anthony Lucas	Sr
TE	85	Joe Dean Davenport	Sr

Defense

Pos.	#	Name	Class
CB	18	David Barrett	Sr
FS	29	Kenoy Kennedy	Sr
LB	53	Quenton Caver	Jr

Special teams

Pos.	#	Name	Class

Head coach

- Houston Nutt

Coordinators/assistant coaches

- Keith Burns (defensive coordinator)
- Mike Markuson (offensive line)
- Barry Lunney Jr. (graduate assistant)

Legend

- (C) Team captain
- (S) Suspended
- (I) Ineligible
- Injured
- Redshirt

Roster
