= 1999 Georgia Bulldogs football team =

American college football season

1999 Georgia Bulldogs football

Outback Bowl champion

Outback Bowl, W 28–25 ^{OT} vs. Purdue
- Conference: Southeastern Conference
- Eastern Division

Ranking
- Coaches: No. 16
- AP: No. 16
- Record: 8–4 (5–3 SEC)
- Head coach: Jim Donnan (4th season)
- Offensive scheme: Pro-style
- Defensive coordinator: Kevin Ramsey (1st season)
- Base defense: 4–3
- Home stadium: Sanford Stadium

1999 Southeastern Conference football standings
	Conf.			Overall
Team	W		L	W		L
Eastern Division
No. 12 Florida x	7	–	1	9	–	4
No. 9 Tennessee	6	–	2	9	–	3
No. 16 Georgia	5	–	3	8	–	4
Kentucky	4	–	4	6	–	6
Vanderbilt	2	–	6	5	–	6
South Carolina	0	–	8	0	–	11
Western Division
No. 8 Alabama x$	7	–	1	10	–	3
No. 13 Mississippi State	6	–	2	10	–	2
No. 22 Ole Miss	4	–	4	8	–	4
No. 17 Arkansas	4	–	4	8	–	4
Auburn	2	–	6	5	–	6
LSU	1	–	7	3	–	8
Championship: Alabama 34, Florida 7
$ – BCS representative as conference champion; x – Division champion/co-champions; Rankings from AP Poll

The 1999 Georgia Bulldogs football team represented the University of Georgia as a member of the Eastern Division of the Southeastern Conference during the 1999 NCAA Division I-A football season. In their fourth year under head coach Jim Donnan, the Bulldogs compiled an overall record of 8–4 record with a mark of 5–3 in conference play, an placing third in the SEC's Eastern Division. Georgia was invited to the Outback Bowl, where the Bulldogs defeated Purdue. The team played home games at Sanford Stadium in Athens, Georgia.

During the 1990s, the Bulldogs compiled a record of 72–43–1 under head coaches Donnan and Ray Goff, for a .625 winning percentage. Georgia's cumulative record through 1999 was 633–358–54, for a .632 winning percentage.

== Schedule ==
Date	Time	Opponent	Rank	Site	TV	Result	Attendance	Source
September 4	6:00 p.m.	Utah State*	No. 12	Sanford Stadium; Athens, GA	PPV	W 38–7	86,117	
September 11	5:00 p.m.	South Carolina	No. 12	Sanford Stadium; Athens, GA (rivalry)	ESPN2	W 24–9	86,117	
September 25	1:00 p.m.	UCF*	No. 11	Sanford Stadium; Athens, GA		W 24–23	86,117	
October 2	11:30 a.m.	LSU	No. 10	Sanford Stadium; Athens, GA	JPS	W 23–22	86,117	
October 9	7:00 p.m.	at No. 6 Tennessee	No. 10	Neyland Stadium; Knoxville, TN (rivalry)	ESPN	L 20–37	107,247	
October 16	2:00 p.m.	at Vanderbilt	No. 14	Vanderbilt Stadium; Nashville, TN (rivalry)		W 27–17	39,210	
October 23	12:30 p.m.	Kentucky^{†}	No. 14	Sanford Stadium; Athens, GA	JPS	W 49–34	86,117	
October 30	3:30 p.m.	vs. No. 5 Florida	No. 10	Alltel Stadium; Jacksonville, FL (rivalry, College GameDay)	CBS	L 14–30	84,397	
November 13	6:00 p.m.	Auburn	No. 14	Sanford Stadium; Athens, GA (Deep South's Oldest Rivalry)	ESPN2	L 21–38	86,117	
November 20	6:00 p.m.	at No. 16 Ole Miss	No. 21	Vaught–Hemingway Stadium; Oxford, MS	ESPN2	W 20–17	50,876	
November 27	1:00 p.m.	at No. 20 Georgia Tech*	No. 16	Bobby Dodd Stadium; Atlanta, GA (Clean, Old-Fashioned Hate)	ABC	L 48–51 ^{OT}	46,450	
January 1, 2000	11:00 a.m.	vs. No. 19 Purdue*	No. 21	Raymond James Stadium; Tampa, FL (Outback Bowl)	ESPN	W 28–25 ^{OT}	54,059	
*Non-conference game; ^{†}Homecoming; Rankings from AP Poll released prior to the game; All times are in Eastern time

== Rankings ==
Ranking movements Legend: ██ Increase in ranking ██ Decrease in ranking — = Not ranked
	Week																
Poll	Pre	1	2	3	4	5	6	7	8	9	10	11	12	13	14	15	Final
AP	14	12	12	11	11	10	10	14	14	10	14	14	21	16	21	21	16
Coaches	13	13*	12	11	9	11	9	14	14	10	16	16	23	21	23	24	16
BCS	Not released									—	—	—	—	—	—	—	Not released

== Roster ==
1999 Georgia Bulldogs football team roster
Players
Coaches
Offense

Pos.	#	Name	Class
RB	30	Robert Arnaud	Sr
OL	60	Josh Billue	Fr
TE	84	Robert Brannon	Fr
OL	70	Kevin Breedlove	Fr
RB	49	Johnny Brown	Jr
QB	17	Quincy Carter	So
WR	8	Terrence Edwards	Fr
OT	71	George Foster	Fr
WR	18	Damien Gary	Fr
RB		Verron Haynes	So
G	73	Steve Herndon	Sr
OT	75	Jonas Jennings	Jr
TE	48	Jevaris Johnson	Jr
TE	86	Randy McMichael	So
RB	39	Brett Millican	Jr
FL	12	LaBrone Mitchell	So
G	76	Travers Paine	So
WR	3	Thad Parker	Jr
QB		Brent Parks	Jr
RB	6	Patrick Pass	Sr
C	55	Brady Pate	Jr
QB	16	Cory Phillips	Fr
G	63	Reggie Stargill	Jr
G	52	Keith Stephens	Fr
OT	78	Jon Stinchcomb	Fr
OT	61	Kelvin Williams	Sr

Defense

Pos.	#	Name	Class
DE	94	Bruce Adrine	So
LB	45	Boss Bailey	Fr
LB	37	Kendrell Bell	Jr
SS	15	Terreal Bierria	Fr
DB	22	Decory Bryant	Fr
FS	23	Cap Burnett	Fr
DE	92	Demetric Evans	Jr
WLB	43	Ryan Fleming	So
LB	42	Tony Gilbert	Fr
LB	19	Charles Grant	Fr
LB	58	Orantes Grant	Sr
CB	13	Jeff Harris	Sr
CB	31	Jamie Henderson	Jr
DT	98	Josh Mallard	So
FS	1	Larry Mann	Sr
DT	51	Brandon Miller	Sr
LB	47	Jessie Miller	Fr
DT	93	Richard Seymour	Jr
DT	97	Marcus Stroud	Jr
CB	2	Tim Wansley	So
MLB	46	Will Witherspoon	So
DE	91	Shedrick Wynn	Fr

Special teams

Pos.	#	Name	Class

Head coach

- Jim Donnan

Coordinators/assistant coaches

- Phil Jones (defensive ends)

Legend

- (C) Team captain
- (S) Suspended
- (I) Ineligible
- Injured
- Redshirt

Roster
