= Austin Mack (quarterback) =

American football player (born 2006)

No. 10 – Alabama Crimson Tide
- Position: Quarterback
- Class: Redshirt Junior

Personal information
- Born: June 5, 2006 (age 20); Loomis, California, U.S.
- Listed height: 6 ft 6 in (1.98 m)
- Listed weight: 232 lb (105 kg)

Career information
- High school: Folsom (Folsom, California)
- College: Washington (2023); Alabama (2024–present)
- Stats at ESPN

Austin Mack (born June 5, 2006) is an American college football quarterback for the Alabama Crimson Tide. He previously played for the Washington Huskies.

== Early life ==
Mack attended Folsom High School in Folsom, California. As a junior in 2022, he was named the Sacramento Bee' Large School Player of the Year after completing 269 of 382 passes for 3,498 yards and 40 touchdowns. A four-star recruit, Mack reclassified from the 2024 to 2023 class. He committed to the University of Washington to play college football.

== College career ==
In 2023, Mack redshirted in his lone season at the University of Washington. After the season, he entered the transfer portal and followed Washington head coach Kalen DeBoer to the University of Alabama. In 2024, Mack spent his first season at Alabama as a backup to redshirt junior Jalen Milroe and appeared in one game, completing two of three passes for 39 yards and a touchdown.

After Milroe entered the 2025 NFL draft, Mack spent the 2025 season backing up redshirt junior Ty Simpson along with freshman Keelon Russell. He appeared in four games completing 24 of 32 passes for 228 yards and two touchdowns while rushing for 22 yards and a rushing touchdown on 9 carries.

After an offseason quarterback competition, Mack was named as the second string quarterback behind redshirt freshman Keelon Russell ahead of the 2026 season.

=== College statistics ===
Season	Team	Games			Passing								Rushing			
Season	Team	GP	GS	Record	Cmp	Att	Pct	Yds	Y/A	TD	Int	Rtg	Att	Yds	Avg	TD
2023	Washington	0	0	—	Redshirted (redshirt)											
2024	Alabama	1	0	—	2	3	66.7	39	13.0	1	0	285.9	0	0	0.0	0
2025	Alabama	4	0	—	24	32	75.0	228	7.1	2	0	155.5	9	22	2.4	1
2026	Alabama	2	0	0–0	3	4	75.0	23	5.8	0	0	123.7	3	2	0.7	1
Career		7	0	0–0	29	39	74.4	290	7.4	3	0	162.2	12	24	2.0	2
