= 1999 Florida Gators football team =

American college football season

1999 Florida Gators football

SEC Eastern Division champion

SEC Championship Game, L 7–34 vs. Alabama

Florida Citrus Bowl, L 34–37 vs. Michigan State
- Conference: Southeastern Conference
- Eastern Division

Ranking
- Coaches: No. 14
- AP: No. 12
- Record: 9–4 (7–1 SEC)
- Head coach: Steve Spurrier (10th season)
- Offensive scheme: Fun and gun
- Defensive coordinator: Jon Hoke (1st season)
- Base defense: 4–3
- Home stadium: Ben Hill Griffin Stadium

1999 Southeastern Conference football standings
	Conf.			Overall
Team	W		L	W		L
Eastern Division
No. 12 Florida x	7	–	1	9	–	4
No. 9 Tennessee	6	–	2	9	–	3
No. 16 Georgia	5	–	3	8	–	4
Kentucky	4	–	4	6	–	6
Vanderbilt	2	–	6	5	–	6
South Carolina	0	–	8	0	–	11
Western Division
No. 8 Alabama x$	7	–	1	10	–	3
No. 13 Mississippi State	6	–	2	10	–	2
No. 22 Ole Miss	4	–	4	8	–	4
No. 17 Arkansas	4	–	4	8	–	4
Auburn	2	–	6	5	–	6
LSU	1	–	7	3	–	8
Championship: Alabama 34, Florida 7
$ – BCS representative as conference champion; x – Division champion/co-champions; Rankings from AP Poll

The 1999 Florida Gators football team represented the University of Florida during 1999 NCAA Division I-A football season. The season was Steve Spurrier's tenth as the head coach of the Florida Gators football team. The Gators returned to the SEC Championship Game after a two-year hiatus, but did not bring home another SEC Championship trophy. After losing the SEC Championship Game, 34–7, to the Alabama Crimson Tide, the Gators ended their season with a last-second 37–34 loss to the Michigan State Spartans in the Citrus Bowl. Spurrier's 1999 Florida Gators posted a 9–4 overall record and a 7–1 record in the Southeastern Conference, placing first among the six SEC Eastern Division teams.

== Schedule ==
Date	Opponent	Rank	Site	TV	Result	Attendance	Source
September 4	Western Michigan*	No. 4	Ben Hill Griffin Stadium; Gainesville, FL	PPV	W 55–26	85,322	
September 11	UCF*	No. 4	Ben Hill Griffin Stadium; Gainesville, FL	PPV	W 58–27	85,346	
September 18	No. 2 Tennessee	No. 4	Ben Hill Griffin Stadium; Gainesville, FL (rivalry / College GameDay)	CBS	W 23–21	85,707	
September 25	at Kentucky	No. 3	Commonwealth Stadium; Lexington, KY (rivalry)	ESPN	W 38–10	70,971	
October 2	No. 21 Alabama	No. 3	Ben Hill Griffin Stadium; Gainesville, FL (rivalry)	CBS	L 39–40 ^{OT}	85,721	
October 9	at LSU	No. 8	Tiger Stadium; Baton Rouge, LA (rivalry)	CBS	W 31–10	80,255	
October 16	at Auburn	No. 7	Jordan–Hare Stadium; Auburn, AL (rivalry)	ESPN	W 32–14	85,214	
October 30	vs. No. 10 Georgia	No. 5	Alltel Stadium; Jacksonville, FL (rivalry / College GameDay)	CBS	W 30–14	84,397	
November 6	Vanderbilt^{†}	No. 5	Ben Hill Griffin Stadium; Gainesville, FL	CBS	W 13–6	85,117	
November 13	at South Carolina	No. 4	Williams–Brice Stadium; Columbia, SC	JPS	W 20–3	73,951	
November 20	No. 1 Florida State*	No. 3	Ben Hill Griffin Stadium; Gainesville, FL (rivalry / College GameDay)	CBS	L 23–30	85,747	
December 4	vs. No. 7 Alabama	No. 5	Georgia Dome; Atlanta, GA (SEC Championship)	ABC	L 7–34	74,309	
January 1, 2000	vs. No. 9 Michigan State*	No. 10	Florida Citrus Bowl; Orlando, FL (Florida Citrus Bowl)	ABC	L 34–37	62,011	
*Non-conference game; ^{†}Homecoming; Rankings from AP Poll released prior to the game

== Rankings ==
Ranking movements Legend: ██ Increase in ranking ██ Decrease in ranking ( ) = First-place votes
	Week																
Poll	Pre	1	2	3	4	5	6	7	8	9	10	11	12	13	14	15	Final
AP	5 (1)	4 (1)	4 (1)	4 (1)	3 (3)	3 (3)	8	7	6	5	5	4	3	5	5	10	12
Coaches	5	5*	4	4	3 (3)	3 (2)	7	6	6	5	5	4	3	6	5	10	14
BCS	Not released									6	4	4	4	5	4	10	Not released

== Game summaries ==
=== Georgia ===
Florida vs. Georgia

Team	1	2	3	4	Total
Georgia	7	7	0	0	14
• Florida	10	6	0	14	30

- Date: October 30
- Location: Alltel Stadium, Jacksonville, Florida
- Game start: 3:40 p.m. EST
- Elapsed time: 3:22
- Game attendance: 84,397
- Game weather: Light rain, 79 F, Wind 14 E
- Referee: Doyle Jackson
- Television network: CBS

Scoring summary
1	10:40	FLA	Travis Taylor 11 yard pass from Doug Johnson (Jeff Chandler kick)	FLA 7-0
1	10:02	UGA	Quincy Carter 3 yard run (Hap Hines kick)	Tied 7-7
1	0:35	FLA	Jeff Chandler 40 yard field goal	FLA 10-7
2	10:47	UGA	Quincy Carter 16 yard run (Hap Hines kick)	UGA 14-10
2	5:52	FLA	Robert Gillespie 2 yard run (run failed)	FLA 16-14
4	7:43	FLA	Bo Carroll 30 yard run (Jeff Chandler kick)	FLA 23-14
4	6:43	FLA	Doug Johnson 2 yard run (Jeff Chandler kick)	FLA 30-14

== Roster ==
1999 Florida Gators football team roster
Players
Coaches
Offense

Pos.	#	Name	Class
RB	5	Earnest Graham	Fr
WR	6	Taylor Jacobs	Fr
QB	7	Jesse Palmer	Jr
QB	8	Rex Grossman	Fr
WR	9	Darrell Jackson	Jr
WR	10	John Capel	So
QB	12	Doug Johnson	Sr
WR	17	Reche Caldwell	Fr
WR	19	Travis Taylor	Jr
OT	70	Cooper Carlisle	Sr
OT	71	Mike Pearson	Fr
OT	78	Kenyatta Walker	So
TE	82	Aaron Walker	Fr
WR	85	Jabar Gaffney	Fr
TE	88	Erron Kinney	Sr

Defense

Pos.	#	Name	Class
CB	3	Lito Sheppard	Fr
SS	4	Marquand Manuel	So
DE	11	Thaddeus Bullard	Sr
DE	13	Alex Brown	So
LB	45	Andra Davis	So
DT	61	Gerard Warren	So

Special teams

Pos.	#	Name	Class
K	49	Jeff Chandler	Jr

Head coach

- Steve Spurrier

Coordinators/assistant coaches

- Rod Broadway
  Defensive line
- Sammy McCorkle
  Graduate assistant

Legend

- (C) Team captain
- (S) Suspended
- (I) Ineligible
- Injured
- Redshirt

Roster
