= Keelon Russell =

American football player (born 2007)

No. 12 – Alabama Crimson Tide
- Position: Quarterback
- Class: Sophomore

Personal information
- Born: April 24, 2007 (age 19); Dallas, Texas, U.S.
- Listed height: 6 ft 3 in (1.91 m)
- Listed weight: 201 lb (91 kg)

Career information
- High school: Duncanville (Duncanville, Texas)
- College: Alabama (2025–present)
- Stats at ESPN

Keelon Russell (born April 24, 2007) is an American college football quarterback for the Alabama Crimson Tide.

== Early life and high school career ==
Russell was born on April 24, 2007, in Dallas, Texas, growing up in South Dallas. Russell attended and played high school football at Duncanville High School in Duncanville, Texas. He was a member of the 2025 college football recruiting class and was rated as a five star recruit. During his junior season, he completed 72% of his passes for 3,483 yards and 38 touchdowns, while throwing just three interceptions. During that season, he also led Duncanville to its second consecutive 6A Division 1 state title. On September 21, 2023, Russell committed to play college football for the SMU Mustangs. On June 4, 2024, Russell flipped his commitment to the Alabama Crimson Tide. When asked about why he flipped his commitment, Russell referenced the relationships he developed with the Crimson Tide's coaching staff and Michael Penix Jr. development under then-Washington head coach Kalen DeBoer. In June 2024, Russell won the Elite 11 Finals and was named the MVP of the competition.

Russell also ran track for Duncanville where he competed in the 200m, 400m, and 4 × 400 m. The team set a school record for the 4 × 400 m.

College recruiting
Name	Hometown	School	Height	Weight	Commit date
Keelon Russell; QB	Duncanville, Texas	Duncanville	6 ft 3 in (1.91 m)	185 lb (84 kg)	Jun 4, 2024
Keelon Russell; QB	Recruit ratings: Rivals: 247Sports: ESPN: (93)				

== College career ==
=== 2025 season ===
In January 2025, Russell enrolled at the University of Alabama to play college football for the Alabama Crimson Tide. Russell was a reserve quarterback behind backup Austin Mack and redshirt junior quarterback Ty Simpson throughout the 2025 season. During the season he appeared in two games, completing eleven passes for 143 yards and two touchdowns while rushing for 17 yards on three carries.

=== 2026 season ===
Ahead of the 2026 season, Russell was in a quarterback competition with Austin Mack. On August 22, 2026, Russell was named the starter, beating out Mack in training camp.

=== College statistics ===
Season	Team	Games			Passing								Rushing			
Season	Team	GP	GS	Record	Cmp	Att	Pct	Yds	Avg	TD	Int	Rtg	Att	Yds	Avg	TD
2025	Alabama	2	0	—	11	15	73.3	143	9.5	2	0	197.4	3	17	5.7	0
2026	Alabama	10	10	8–2	187	278	67.3	2,480	8.9	21	6	162.6	82	277	3.4	5
Career		12	10	8–2	198	293	67.6	2,623	9.0	23	6	164.6	85	293	3.5	5
