= 1999 Alabama Crimson Tide football team =

American college football season

1999 Alabama Crimson Tide football

SEC champion SEC Western Division champion

SEC Championship Game, W 34–7 vs. Florida

Orange Bowl, L 34–35 ^{OT} vs. Michigan
- Conference: Southeastern Conference
- Western Division

Ranking
- Coaches: No. 8
- AP: No. 8
- Record: 10–3 (7–1 SEC)
- Head coach: Mike DuBose (3rd season)
- Offensive coordinator: Neil Callaway (2nd season)
- Co-offensive coordinator: Charlie Stubbs (2nd season)
- Defensive coordinator: Ellis Johnson (3rd season)
- Captains: Shaun Alexander; Cornelius Griffin; Miguel Merritt; Ryan Pflunger; Chris Samuels
- Home stadium: Bryant–Denny Stadium; Legion Field

1999 Southeastern Conference football standings
	Conf.			Overall
Team	W		L	W		L
Eastern Division
No. 12 Florida x	7	–	1	9	–	4
No. 9 Tennessee	6	–	2	9	–	3
No. 16 Georgia	5	–	3	8	–	4
Kentucky	4	–	4	6	–	6
Vanderbilt	2	–	6	5	–	6
South Carolina	0	–	8	0	–	11
Western Division
No. 8 Alabama x$	7	–	1	10	–	3
No. 13 Mississippi State	6	–	2	10	–	2
No. 22 Ole Miss	4	–	4	8	–	4
No. 17 Arkansas	4	–	4	8	–	4
Auburn	2	–	6	5	–	6
LSU	1	–	7	3	–	8
Championship: Alabama 34, Florida 7
$ – BCS representative as conference champion; x – Division champion/co-champions; Rankings from AP Poll

The 1999 Alabama Crimson Tide football team represented the University of Alabama as a member of the Western Division of the Southeastern Conference (SEC) during the 1999 NCAA Division I-A football season. Led by third-year head coach Mike DuBose, the Crimson Tide compiled an overall record of 10–3 with a mark of 7–1 in conference play, winning the SEC's Western Division title. Alabama advanced to the SEC Championship Game, where the Crimson Tide defeated Florida to capture the conference championship. Alabama was invited to the Orange Bowl, losing there to Michigan. The team played home games at Bryant–Denny Stadium in Tuscaloosa, Alabama, and Legion Field in Birmingham, Alabama.

After a stunning last second loss to Louisiana Tech early in the year, Alabama finished the regular season at 9–2 win a win over Auburn on the road for the first time ever in the Iron Bowl. In SEC Championship Game, the Crimson Tide defeated Florida for the second time in the season. Alabama lost to Michigan in the Orange Bowl, 35–34 in overtime, due to a missed extra point. Alabama had beaten Florida during the regular season by a single point in overtime, also due to a missed extra point.

== Schedule ==
Date	Time	Opponent	Rank	Site	TV	Result	Attendance	Source
September 4	11:30 a.m.	at Vanderbilt	No. 20	Vanderbilt Stadium; Nashville, TN	JPS	W 28–17	41,600	
September 11	11:30 a.m.	Houston*	No. 21	Legion Field; Birmingham, AL	JPS	W 37–10	80,110	
September 18	4:00 p.m.	Louisiana Tech*	No. 18	Legion Field; Birmingham, AL	PPV	L 28–29	80,312	
September 25	2:30 p.m.	No. 14 Arkansas		Bryant–Denny Stadium; Tuscaloosa, AL	CBS	W 35–28	83,818	
October 2	2:30 p.m.	at No. 3 Florida	No. 21	Ben Hill Griffin Stadium; Gainesville, FL (rivalry)	CBS	W 40–39 ^{OT}	85,721	
October 16	2:30 p.m.	at No. 22 Ole Miss	No. 11	Vaught–Hemingway Stadium; Oxford, MS (rivalry)	CBS	W 30–24	52,122	
October 23	2:30 p.m.	No. 5 Tennessee	No. 10	Bryant–Denny Stadium; Tuscaloosa, AL (Third Saturday in October)	CBS	L 7–21	86,869	
October 30	2:00 p.m.	No. 20 Southern Miss*^{†}	No. 14	Bryant–Denny Stadium; Tuscaloosa, AL	PPV	W 35–14	83,818	
November 6	11:30 a.m.	LSU	No. 12	Bryant–Denny Stadium; Tuscaloosa, AL (rivalry)	JPS	W 23–17	83,818	
November 13	2:30 p.m.	No. 8 Mississippi State	No. 11	Bryant–Denny Stadium; Tuscaloosa, AL (rivalry)	CBS	W 19–7	83,818	
November 20	6:30 p.m.	at Auburn	No. 8	Jordan–Hare Stadium; Auburn, AL (Iron Bowl)	ESPN	W 28–17	85,214	
December 4	7:00 p.m.	vs. No. 5 Florida	No. 7	Georgia Dome; Atlanta, GA (SEC Championship Game)	ABC	W 34–7	74,309	
January 1, 2000	7:30 p.m.	vs. No. 8 Michigan*	No. 5	Pro Player Stadium; Miami, Gardens, FL (Orange Bowl)	ABC	L 34–35 ^{OT}	70,461	
*Non-conference game; ^{†}Homecoming; Rankings from AP Poll released prior to the game; All times are in Central time

== Rankings ==
Ranking movements Legend: ██ Increase in ranking ██ Decrease in ranking — = Not ranked
	Week																
Poll	Pre	1	2	3	4	5	6	7	8	9	10	11	12	13	14	15	Final
AP	20	20	21	18	—	21	12	11	10	14	12	11	8	8	7	5	8
Coaches	20	20	22	18	—	22	14	13	12	16	14	13	8	9	8	6	8
BCS	Not released									13	9	9	6	8	7	4	Not released

== Game summaries ==
=== Vanderbilt ===
	1	2	3	4	Total
No. 20 Crimson Tide	0	7	7	14	28
Commodores	0	7	10	0	17

Shaun Alexander scored the final two touchdowns in the 4th quarter to rally Alabama to a season opening road win over Vanderbilt.

Statistics	Alabama	Vanderbilt
First downs	18	13
Total yards	343	230
Rushing yards	142	110
Passing yards	201	120
Turnovers	1	0
Time of possession	31:22	28:38

Team	Category	Player	Statistics
Alabama	Passing	Andrew Zow	15–24, 201 yards, 2 TD's
Alabama	Rushing	Shaun Alexander	26 carries, 109 yards, 2 TD's
Alabama	Receiving	Shaun Alexander	4 receptions, 85 yards, 1 TD
Vanderbilt	Passing	Greg Zolman	12–24, 120 yards, 1 TD
Vanderbilt	Rushing	Rodney Williams	14 carries, 76 yards
Vanderbilt	Receiving	Elliot Carson	2 receptions, 42 yards

=== Houston ===
	1	2	3	4	Total
Cougars	3	0	7	0	10
No. 21 Crimson Tide	10	7	6	14	37

Alabama had over 500 yards of offense for just the second time in the Mike DuBose era, and won convincingly over Houston.

Statistics	Houston	Alabama
First downs	16	24
Total yards	274	505
Rushing yards	103	275
Passing yards	171	230
Turnovers	1	1
Time of possession	28:06	31:54

Team	Category	Player	Statistics
Houston	Passing	Jason McKinley	12–25, 169 yards, 1 TD
Houston	Rushing	Ketric Sanford	5 carries, 70 yards, 1 TD
Houston	Receiving	Orlando Iglesias	6 receptions, 105 yards, 1 TD
Alabama	Passing	Andrew Zow	8–18, 156 yards, 3 TD's, 1 INT
Alabama	Rushing	Shaun Alexander	27 carries, 167 yards, 2 TD's
Alabama	Receiving	Terry Jones Jr.	3 receptions, 124 yards, 1 TD

=== Louisiana Tech ===
	1	2	3	4	Total
Bulldogs	6	6	3	14	29
No. 18 Crimson Tide	0	3	15	10	28

Back-up quarterback Brian Stallworth found Sean Cangelosi in the end zone with two seconds left as Louisiana Tech upset Alabama for the second time in three years.

Statistics	Louisiana Tech	Alabama
First downs	24	17
Total yards	416	306
Rushing yards	16	202
Passing yards	400	104
Turnovers	3	4
Time of possession	30:34	29:26

Team	Category	Player	Statistics
Louisiana Tech	Passing	Tim Rattay	27–50, 368 yards, 3 TD's, 1 INT
Louisiana Tech	Rushing	Bobby Ray Tell	16 carries, 53 yards
Louisiana Tech	Receiving	Sean Cangelosi	8 receptions, 147 yards, 2 TD's
Alabama	Passing	Andrew Zow	8–19, 104 yards, 1 INT
Alabama	Rushing	Shaun Alexander	30 carries, 173 yards, 2 TD's
Alabama	Receiving	Antonio Carter	2 receptions, 36 yards

=== Arkansas ===
	1	2	3	4	Total
No. 14 Razorbacks	10	3	8	7	28
Crimson Tide	7	7	14	7	35

Despite turning the football over six times, Alabama managed to hold on and upset No. 14 Arkansas at Bryant-Denny Stadium. This was the first time under Mike DuBose that Alabama beat a ranked opponent at home.

Statistics	Arkansas	Alabama
First downs	14	22
Total yards	380	494
Rushing yards	64	184
Passing yards	316	310
Turnovers	1	6
Time of possession	25:34	34:26

Team	Category	Player	Statistics
Arkansas	Passing	Clint Stoerner	24–52, 316 yards, 1 TD, 1 INT
Arkansas	Rushing	Cedric Cobbs	9 carries, 44 yards
Arkansas	Receiving	Anthony Lucas	4 receptions, 93 yards
Alabama	Passing	Andrew Zow	14–24, 234 yards, 2 TD's, 3 INT's
Alabama	Rushing	Shaun Alexander	34 carries, 165 yards, 1 TD
Alabama	Receiving	Jason McAddley	3 receptions, 110 yards, 1 TD

=== Florida ===
	1	2	3	4	OT	Total
No. 21 Crimson Tide	3	10	6	14	7	40
No. 3 Gators	7	0	15	11	6	39

The Crimson Tide snapped No. 3 Florida's 30-game winning streak at The Swamp when Chris Kemp got a second chance on an extra-point attempt in overtime and drilled it.

Statistics	Alabama	Florida
First downs	23	21
Total yards	447	449
Rushing yards	111	140
Passing yards	336	309
Turnovers	2	3
Time of possession	41:22	18:38

Team	Category	Player	Statistics
Alabama	Passing	Andrew Zow	28–40, 336 yards, 2 TD's, 1 INT
Alabama	Rushing	Shaun Alexander	28 carries, 106 yards, 3 TD's
Alabama	Receiving	Freddie Milons	10 receptions, 119 yards
Florida	Passing	Doug Johnson	22–31, 309 yards, 4 TD's
Florida	Rushing	Robert Gillespie	11 carries, 86 yards
Florida	Receiving	Darrell Jackson	6 receptions, 127 yards, 3 TD's

=== Ole Miss ===
	1	2	3	4	Total
No. 11 Crimson Tide	10	7	10	3	30
No. 22 Rebels	0	7	10	7	24

Despite having a 27–7 lead midway through the third quarter, Alabama had to hold on late to beat Ole Miss. This win extended Alabama win streak to 3 games in a row, the longest since 1996.

Statistics	Alabama	Ole Miss
First downs	22	21
Total yards	413	376
Rushing yards	236	141
Passing yards	177	235
Turnovers	0	2
Time of possession	35:16	24:44

Team	Category	Player	Statistics
Alabama	Passing	Andrew Zow	16–28, 177 yards
Alabama	Rushing	Shaun Alexander	36 carries, 214 yards, 3 TD's
Alabama	Receiving	Freddie Milons	9 receptions, 133 yards
Ole Miss	Passing	Romaro Miller	15–31, 217 yards, 1 TD
Ole Miss	Rushing	Deuce McAllister	13 carries, 62 yards, 2 TD's
Ole Miss	Receiving	Cory Peterson	8 receptions, 137 yards

=== Tennessee ===
	1	2	3	4	Total
No. 5 Volunteers	0	7	7	7	21
No. 10 Crimson Tide	0	7	0	0	7

For the first time since 1930, the Third Saturday in October would be in Tuscaloosa. Despite having the largest crowd ever to watch a football game in the state of Alabama to date, The Crimson Tide could not generate enough offense to beat Tennessee. This gave the Volunteers their fifth win in a row against Alabama.

Statistics	Tennessee	Alabama
First downs	18	15
Total yards	337	267
Rushing yards	190	94
Passing yards	147	173
Turnovers	1	0
Time of possession	32:22	27:38

Team	Category	Player	Statistics
Tennessee	Passing	Tee Martin	11–17, 147 yards, 1 TD
Tennessee	Rushing	Jamal Lewis	23 carries, 117 yards
Tennessee	Receiving	Cedrick Wilson	5 receptions, 53 yards
Alabama	Passing	Andrew Zow	19–37, 168 yards, 1 TD
Alabama	Rushing	Shaun Alexander	20 carries, 98 yards
Alabama	Receiving	Freddie Milons	5 receptions, 52 yards

=== Southern Miss ===
	1	2	3	4	Total
No. 20 Golden Eagles	0	7	0	7	14
No. 14 Crimson Tide	10	10	15	0	35

Behind the Alabama defense who would hold Southern Miss to -13 yards rushing, Alabama would generate enough points with a pick six and a punt return to beat Southern Miss for the eight year in a row.

Statistics	Southern Miss	Alabama
First downs	16	15
Total yards	249	267
Rushing yards	–13	131
Passing yards	262	136
Turnovers	2	1
Time of possession	28:19	31:41

Team	Category	Player	Statistics
Southern Miss	Passing	Jeff Kelly	16–30, 175 yards 1 TD, 2 INT's
Southern Miss	Rushing	Derrick Nix	14 carries, 28 yards
Southern Miss	Receiving	Todd Pinkston	5 receptions, 85 yards
Alabama	Passing	Tyler Watts	11–20, 128 yards, 1 INT
Alabama	Rushing	Shaun Bohanon	28 carries, 104 yards, 2 TD's
Alabama	Receiving	Jason McAddley	2 receptions, 46 yards

=== LSU ===
	1	2	3	4	Total
Tigers	7	0	7	3	17
No. 12 Crimson Tide	0	10	13	0	23

The 1999 version of a Goal Line stand as Alabama would deny LSU quarterback Josh Booty of a potential game winning touchdown run by knocking him down six inches short of the end zone to win.

Statistics	LSU	Alabama
First downs	14	24
Total yards	208	354
Rushing yards	32	151
Passing yards	176	203
Turnovers	4	4
Time of possession	22:17	37:43

Team	Category	Player	Statistics
LSU	Passing	Josh Booty	15–36, 176 yards, 1 TD, 4 INT's
LSU	Rushing	Jerel Myers	1 carry, 16 yards
LSU	Receiving	Abram Booty	4 receptions, 58 yards
Alabama	Passing	Tyler Watts	23–36, 203 yards, 2 TD's 2 INT's
Alabama	Rushing	Shaun Bohanon	22 carries, 83 yards
Alabama	Receiving	Freddie Milons	8 receptions, 57 yards

=== Mississippi State ===
	1	2	3	4	Total
No. 8 Bulldogs	0	7	0	0	7
No. 11 Crimson Tide	3	7	3	6	19

With the help of three Mississippi State interceptions, Alabama would end their three-game losing streak to the Bulldogs and be one win away from winning the SEC West.

Statistics	Mississippi State	Alabama
First downs	12	15
Total yards	232	315
Rushing yards	24	93
Passing yards	208	222
Turnovers	3	1
Time of possession	27:25	32:35

Team	Category	Player	Statistics
Mississippi State	Passing	Wayne Madkin	14–21, 168 yards, 1 TD, 2 INT's
Mississippi State	Rushing	Chris Rainey	7 carries, 22 yards
Mississippi State	Receiving	Kelvin Love	4 receptions, 109 yards
Alabama	Passing	Andrew Zow	18–34, 222 yards, 1 TD, 1 INT
Alabama	Rushing	Shaun Alexander	24 carries, 54 yards, 1 TD
Alabama	Receiving	Freddie Milons	9 receptions, 94 yards

=== Auburn ===
	1	2	3	4	Total
No. 8 Crimson Tide	6	0	2	20	28
Tigers	0	14	0	3	17

Shaun Alexander scored all three of Alabama touchdowns in the fourth quarter as the Crimson Tide rallied back for the second year in a row to beat Auburn. This would also be the first time Alabama won at Jordan-Hare Stadium. With the win, Alabama clinched the SEC West for the first time since 1996.

Statistics	Alabama	Auburn
First downs	22	21
Total yards	350	303
Rushing yards	226	66
Passing yards	124	237
Turnovers	1	2
Time of possession	32:34	27:26

Team	Category	Player	Statistics
Alabama	Passing	Andrew Zow	12–20, 67 yards, 1 INT
Alabama	Rushing	Shaun Alexander	33 carries, 182 yards, 3 TD's
Alabama	Receiving	Freddie Milons	6 receptions, 54 yards
Auburn	Passing	Ben Leard	26–39, 237 yards, 2 TD's, 1 INT
Auburn	Rushing	Heath Evans	21 carries, 83 yards
Auburn	Receiving	Ronney Daniels	6 receptions, 78 yards

=== Florida ===
	1	2	3	4	Total
No. 5 Gators	7	0	0	0	7
No. 7 Crimson Tide	0	12	3	19	34

Alabama used 34 unanswered points to beat Florida for the second time in 1999. This would be the Crimson Tide's first SEC Championship since 1992.

Statistics	Florida	Alabama
First downs	6	22
Total yards	114	462
Rushing yards	31	300
Passing yards	83	162
Turnovers	4	1
Time of possession	19:49	40:11

Team	Category	Player	Statistics
Florida	Passing	Jesse Palmer	7–20, 80 yards, 3 INT's
Florida	Rushing	Earnest Graham	9 carries, 27 yards
Florida	Receiving	Darrell Jackson	3 receptions, 49 yards
Alabama	Passing	Andrew Zow	10–17, 134 yards, 1 TD
Alabama	Rushing	Freddie Milons	6 carries, 116 yards, 1 TD
Alabama	Receiving	Antonio Carter	5 receptions, 71 yards

=== Michigan ===
	1	2	3	4	OT	Total
No. 8 Wolverines	0	7	21	0	7	35
No. 5 Crimson Tide	0	14	14	0	6	34

Despite holding a 14-point lead in the third quarter, Alabama could not hold on and would lose in overtime on a missed extra point by Ryan Pflugner.

Statistics	Michigan	Alabama
First downs	18	12
Total yards	406	305
Rushing yards	37	184
Passing yards	369	121
Turnovers	1	0
Time of possession	32:08	27:52

Team	Category	Player	Statistics
Michigan	Passing	Tom Brady	34–46, 369 yards, 4 TD's
Michigan	Rushing	Anthony Thomas	18 carries, 40 yards, 1 TD
Michigan	Receiving	David Terrell	10 receptions, 150 yards, 3 TD
Alabama	Passing	Andrew Zow	7–14, 86 yards, 1 TD
Alabama	Rushing	Shaun Alexander	25 carries, 161 yards, 3 TD's
Alabama	Receiving	Antonio Carter	4 receptions, 38 yards, 1 TD

== Personnel ==
=== Coaching staff ===
Name	Position	Consecutive seasons at Alabama
Mike DuBose	Head coach	3rd
Neil Callaway	Offensive coordinator/Offensive line coach	3rd
Ronnie Cottrell	Assistant head coach/Tight end	2nd
Charlie Stubbs	Quarterback coach	2nd
Dabo Swinney	Wide receivers coach	7th
Ivy Williams	Running backs coach	5th
Ellis Johnson	Defensive coordinator/Outside linebackers coach	3rd
Charlie Harbison	Cornerbacks coach	2nd
Jeff Rouzie	Special teams coordinator/Inside linebackers coach	9th
Lance Thompson	Defensive line coach	1st

=== Roster ===
1999 Alabama Crimson Tide football team roster
Players
Coaches
Offense

Pos.	#	Name	Class
RB	37	Shaun Alexander	Sr
WR	80	Jason McAddley	So
WR	15	Freddie Milons	So
QB	5	Andrew Zow	So

Defense Travis Hartsfield

Pos.	#	Name	Class

Special teams

Pos.	#	Name	Class

Head coach

- Mike Dubose

Coordinators/assistant coaches

- Mike Bloomgren (Graduate assistant)

Legend

- (C) Team captain
- (S) Suspended
- (I) Ineligible
- Injured
- Redshirt

Roster
