= Santonio Beard =

American gridiron football player (1980–2022)

Profile
- Position: Running back

Personal information
- Born: February 14, 1980; Nashville, Tennessee, U.S.
- Died: February 5, 2022 (aged 41); Lithonia, Georgia, U.S.
- Listed height: 6 ft 0 in (1.83 m)
- Listed weight: 222 lb (101 kg)

Career information
- High school: Nashville (TN) Pearl-Cohn
- College: Alabama
- NFL draft: 2003: undrafted

Career history
- BC Lions (2003)*; Green Bay Packers (2003)*; Oakland Raiders (2003)*; Denver Broncos (2004)*
- * Offseason or practice squad member only

Santonio Beard (February 14, 1980 – February 5, 2022) was an American college football player who was a running back for the University of Alabama. He left just after his junior season in 2002. Beard's most productive season came in 2002 after the exit of Ahmaad Galloway due to injury. Beard rushed for close to 900 yards his junior season, despite splitting carries with former Crimson Tide running back Shaud Williams. He currently shares a University of Alabama record for the most touchdowns in a single game with five. He is tied with NFL running back Shaun Alexander and wide receiver DeVonta Smith. This feat was achieved in 2002 against the University of Mississippi.

Beard's most notable game came against the Auburn Tigers in 2001, in which he and Ahmaad Galloway rushed for close to 300 yards combined. This led to the Crimson Tide's second victory against Auburn University at Jordan–Hare Stadium.

== Professional career ==
After coach Dennis Franchione's departure, Beard decided to forgo his senior year. However, he was undrafted and signed with the B.C. Lions of the Canadian Football League. He played for the Denver Broncos but was cut after the first season.

== Life after football ==
After his football career ended, Beard encountered numerous legal problems, often involving illegal drugs. Beard was shot dead in Lithonia, Georgia, on February 5, 2022, at the age of 41.
