= Andrew Zow =

American football player (born 1968)

Profile
- Position: Quarterback

Career information
- High school: Union County (Lake Butler, Florida)
- College: Alabama (1997–2001)
- NFL draft: 2002: undrafted

Career history
- Montreal Alouettes (2002)*; Birmingham Steeldogs (2004–2005)
- * Offseason or practice squad member only

Andrew Zow is an American former college football quarterback who played for the Alabama Crimson Tide. He finished his college career as the school's all-time leader in completions, passing attempts, and passing yards.

== Early life ==
Zow played high school football at Union County High School in Lake Butler, Florida. He earned all-state honors his junior year but missed half of his senior year due to injury. He was considered a top ten prospect from Florida.

== College career ==
Zow enrolled at the University of Alabama to play college football for the Alabama Crimson Tide. He redshirted the 1997 season and was a four-year letterman from 1998 to 2001. He was the primary starter from 1998 to 2000, and helped Alabama win the 1999 SEC Championship Game. He backed up Tyler Watts in 2001 but still managed to attempt 83 passes while serving as a team co-captain. Zow finished his college career with 459 completions on 852 passing attempts (53.9%) for 5,983 yards, 35 touchdowns, 32 interceptions, and four rushing touchdowns. He was the school's all-time leader in completions, passing attempts, and passing yards while also tying Mike Shula's career passing touchdown record. Zow earned Academic All-SEC honors as a senior, and graduated with a degree in sports fitness management.

== Professional career ==
After going undrafted in the 2002 NFL draft, Zow signed with the Montreal Alouettes of the Canadian Football League (CFL) on May 6. The Tennessee Titans reportedly also tried to sign Zow in May but were unaware that he had already signed with the Alouettes. He left Alouettes' training camp on June 6, 2002.

Zow signed with the Birmingham Steeldogs of the af2 in June 2004 to serve as an emergency backup for one game. He did not play in the game. On March 15, 2005, he signed with the Steeldogs for the 2005 af2 season. Zow won the starting job but suffered a season-ending knee injury early in the year.

== Coaching career ==
Zow returned to his alma mater, Union County High School, as an assistant football coach in 2002. He was the head football coach at Union County High from 2007 to 2009, an assistant at Oak Mountain High School in 2011, an assistant at Montevallo High School (Alabama) from 2012 to 2015, the head coach at Calera High School from 2016 to 2018, the head coach at Bessemer City High School in 2019, and the head coach at Sylacauga High School in 2020.

Zow joined the Clemson Tigers coaching staff in 2021, initially serving as an offensive analyst before becoming senior offensive assistant in 2022 and offensive analyst/assistant running backs coach in 2024. He joined the Samford Bulldogs in 2025 as tight ends coach/chief of offense.

== See also ==
- Alabama Crimson Tide football statistical leaders
