= 2003 Jacksonville Jaguars season =

9th season in franchise history

- Owner: Wayne Weaver
- General manager: James "Shack" Harris
- Head coach: Jack Del Rio
- Offensive coordinator: Bill Musgrave
- Defensive coordinator: Mike Smith
- Home stadium: Alltel Stadium

Results
- Record: 5–11
- Division place: 3rd AFC South
- Playoffs: Did not qualify
- Pro Bowlers: DT Marcus Stroud

Uniform

The 2003 Jacksonville Jaguars season was the franchise's 9th season in the National Football League and the 1st under head coach Jack Del Rio. The Jaguars failed to improve upon their 6–10 regular season record in 2002 and failed to make the playoffs for the fourth season in a row. An 0–8 record in road games eliminated any chance of postseason play.

Oddly, despite being in existence since 1995, this season marked the first time that the Jaguars played the San Diego Chargers. This is due to old NFL scheduling formulas in place prior to 2002; the Jaguars had played the Chargers’ division rivals the Kansas City Chiefs four times; the Denver Broncos three times and the Oakland Raiders twice (though not since 1997).

Week 3 was Mark Brunell's last game as a Jaguar, as he was benched forcing rookie quarterback Byron Leftwich to take his spot for the rest of the season. Brunell left the team at the end of the season.

Jacksonville defeated New Orleans 20–19 in the week 16 game despite the River City Relay, a play that has gone down in NFL lore.

== Offseason ==
=== Acquisitions ===
During free agency, the Jaguars signed former Philadelphia Eagles defensive end Hugh Douglas and former Indianapolis Colts linebacker Mike Peterson.

Additions	Subtractions
DE Hugh Douglas (Eagles)	WR Patrick Johnson (Redskins)
LB Mike Peterson (Colts)	DT Larry Smith (Packers)
WR Troy Edwards (Rams)	DE Marco Coleman (Eagles)
WR Jermaine Lewis (Texans)	LB Wali Rainer (Lions)
G Jamar Nesbit (Panthers)	
FB Marc Edwards (Patriots)	

=== NFL draft ===
2003 Jacksonville Jaguars draft
Round	Pick	Player	Position	College	Notes
1	7	Byron Leftwich	Quarterback	Marshall	
2	39	Rashean Mathis *	Cornerback	Bethune-Cookman	
3	72	Vince Manuwai	Guard	Hawaii	
4	108	George Wrighster	Tight end	Oregon	
4	132	LaBrandon Toefield	Running back	LSU	
6	176	Brandon Green	Defensive end	Rice	
6	179	David Young	Safety	Georgia Southern	
6	193	Marques Ogden	Offensive tackle	Howard	
7	218	Malaefou MacKenzie	Fullback	USC	
Made roster † Pro Football Hall of Fame * Made at least one Pro Bowl during career

=== Undrafted free agents ===
2003 undrafted free agents of note
Player	Position	College
Chris Brown	Cornerback	UAB
Chris L. Brown	Cornerback	Grambling State
Cortez Hankton	Wide receiver	Texas Southern
Matt Leonard	Defensive Tackle	Stanford
Seth Marler	Kicker	Tulane
Curtis Randall	Linebacker	Louisiana Tech
Brett Romberg	Center	Miami (FL)
Kevin Simmons	Wide receiver	Howard
Joe Smith	Running back	Louisiana Tech

== Staff ==
2003 Jacksonville Jaguars staff
Front office: Chairman/chief executive officer – Wayne Weaver; Head coaches: Head coach – Jack Del Rio; Assistant head coach – Steve Shafer; Offensive coaches: Offensive coordinator – Bill Musgrave; Quarterbacks – Ken Anderson; Running backs/assistant special teams – Anthony Lynn; Wide receivers – Larry Kirksey; Tight ends – Alfredo Roberts; Offensive line – Paul Boudreau; Offensive assistant – Mike Sullivan	Defensive coaches: Defensive coordinator – Mike Smith; Defensive line – Ray Hamilton; Linebackers – Mike Haluchak; Defensive backs – Alvin Reynolds; Defensive assistant – Todd Howard; Special teams coaches: Special teams coordinator – Bill Bates; Assistant special teams/assistant strength and conditioning – Paul McCord; Strength and conditioning: Strength and conditioning – Mark Asanovich; Strength and conditioning intern – Vernon Stephens

== Final roster ==
2003 Jacksonville Jaguars roster
Quarterbacks (QB): 8 Mark Brunell; 9 David Garrard; 5 Quinn Gray; 7 Byron Leftwich; Running backs (RB): 34 David Allen KR/PR; 44 Marc Edwards FB; 45 Chris Fuamatu-Maʻafala FB; 28 Fred Taylor; 22 LaBrandon Toefield KR; Wide receivers (WR): 18 Troy Edwards; 85 Cortez Hankton; 81 Matthew Hatchette; 83 Kevin Johnson; 17 Jimmy Redmond; 82 Jimmy Smith; Tight ends (TE): 80 Kyle Brady; 89 Chris Luzar; 87 George Wrighster	Offensive linemen (OL): 76 Leander Jordan G/T; 67 Vince Manuwai G; 63 Brad Meester C; 65 Chris Naeole G; 64 Jamar Nesbit C/G; 77 Marques Ogden T; 72 Mike Pearson T; 66 Brett Romberg C; 74 Maurice Williams T; 60 Sammy Williams T; Defensive linemen (DL): 94 Lionel Barnes DE; 90 Tony Brackens DE; 58 Hugh Douglas DE; 98 John Henderson DT; 96 Matt Leonard DT; 92 Rob Meier DE/DT; 95 Paul Spicer DE; 99 Marcus Stroud DT	Linebackers (LB): 47 Hakim Akbar OLB; 51 Akin Ayodele OLB; 55 Danny Clark OLB; 50 Tony Gilbert MLB; 54 Mike Peterson MLB; 56 Shannon Taylor OLB; Defensive backs (DB): 26 Blue Adams CB; 25 Fernando Bryant CB; 35 Deke Cooper FS; 20 Donovin Darius SS; 27 Rashean Mathis CB/FS; 42 Anthony Mitchell FS; 23 Ray Perryman FS; 41 Nick Sorensen SS; 24 Kiwaukee Thomas CB; Special teams (ST): 6 Seth Marler K; 3 Mark Royals P; 88 Joe Zelenka LS	Practice squad: 31 Chris Brown CB; 61 Konrad Dean T; -- Michael Josiah DE; 59 Curtis Randall LB; 30 Joe Smith RB; Reserve: 29 Jason Craft CB (IR); 97 Brandon Green DE (IR); 2 Chris Hanson P (IR); 56 Deon Humphrey LB (IR); 84 Jermaine Lewis WR (IR); 70 Javor Mills DE (IR); 33 James Trapp CB (IR); 57 Joe Tuipala LB (IR); 52 Eric Westmoreland LB (IR); Rookies in italics 53 active, 9 reserve, 5 practice squad

== Preseason ==
Week	Date	Opponent	Result	Record	Venue
1	August 9	at Minnesota Vikings	W 16–14	1–0	Hubert H. Humphrey Metrodome
2	August 15	Miami Dolphins	W 27–23	2–0	Alltel Stadium
3	August 23	at Tampa Bay Buccaneers	L 6–10	2–1	Raymond James Stadium
4	August 28	Washington Redskins	W 17–15	3–1	Alltel Stadium

== Regular season ==
=== Schedule ===
Week	Date	Opponent	Result	Record	Venue	Attendance
1	September 7	at Carolina Panthers	**L** 23–24	0–1	Ericsson Stadium	72,134
2	September 14	Buffalo Bills	**L** 17–38	0–2	Alltel Stadium	58,613
3	September 21	at **Indianapolis Colts**	**L** 13–23	0–3	RCA Dome	55,770
4	September 28	at **Houston Texans**	**L** 20–24	0–4	Reliant Stadium	70,041
5	October 5	San Diego Chargers	**W** 27–21	1–4	Alltel Stadium	48,954
6	October 12	Miami Dolphins	**L** 10–24	1–5	Alltel Stadium	66,437
7	Bye					
8	October 26	**Tennessee Titans**	**L** 17–30	1–6	Alltel Stadium	55,918
9	November 2	at Baltimore Ravens	**L** 17–24	1–7	Ravens Stadium	69,486
10	November 9	**Indianapolis Colts**	**W** 28–23	2–7	Alltel Stadium	45,037
11	November 16	at **Tennessee Titans**	**L** 3–10	2–8	The Coliseum	68,809
12	November 23	at New York Jets	**L** 10–13	2–9	Giants Stadium	77,614
13	November 30	Tampa Bay Buccaneers	**W** 17–10	3–9	Alltel Stadium	60,543
14	December 7	**Houston Texans**	**W** 27–0	4–9	Alltel Stadium	43,363
15	December 14	at New England Patriots	**L** 13–27	4–10	Gillette Stadium	68,436
16	December 21	New Orleans Saints	**W** 20–19	5–10	Alltel Stadium	49,207
17	December 28	at Atlanta Falcons	**L** 14–21	5–11	Georgia Dome	70,266

Note: Intra-division opponents are in bold text.

=== Game summaries ===
==== Week 1: at Carolina Panthers ====
Week One: Jacksonville Jaguars at Carolina Panthers – Game summary

Quarter	1	2	3	4	Total
Jaguars	0	14	3	6	**23**
Panthers	0	0	7	17	**24**

at Ericsson Stadium, Charlotte, North Carolina

- Date: September 7, 2003
- Game time: 1:00 p.m. EDT
- Game weather: Mostly cloudy, 72 °F (22 °C)
- Game attendance: 72,134
- Referee: Johnny Grier
- Recap, Game Book

Game information

**First quarter**

- No scoring plays.

**Second quarter**

- JAX – Marc Edwards 63-yard run (Seth Marler kick), 4:46. Jaguars 7–0. **Drive: 10 plays, 80 yards, 6:12.**
- JAX – Matthew Hatchette 33-yard pass from Mark Brunell (Seth Marler kick), 0:00. Jaguars 14–0. **Drive: 4 plays, 53 yards, 0:29.**

**Third quarter**

- JAX – Seth Marler 40-yard field goal, 8:52. Jaguars 17–0. **Drive: 10 plays, 49 yards, 6:08.**
- CAR – Muhsin Muhammad 13-yard pass from Jake Delhomme (John Kasay kick), 2:42. Jaguars 17–7. **Drive: 4 plays, 64 yards, 2:10.**

**Fourth quarter**

- CAR – John Kasay 49-yard field goal, 14:55. Jaguars 17–10. **Drive: 9 plays, 26 yards, 4:39.**
- CAR – Punt blocked for a safety, 12:56. Jaguars 17–12.
- CAR – Steve Smith Sr. 24-yard pass from Jake Delhomme (pass failed), 6:10. Panthers 18–17. **Drive: 7 plays, 52 yards, 2:10.**
- JAX – Jermaine Lewis 65-yard pass from Mark Brunell (pass failed), 5:14. Jaguars 23–18. **Drive: 2 plays, 71 yards, 0:56.**
- CAR – Ricky Proehl 12-yard pass from Jake Delhomme (pass failed), 0:16. Panthers 24–23. **Drive: 12 plays, 54 yards, 3:18.**

**Top passers**

- JAX – Mark Brunell – 23/27, 272 yards, 2 TD
- CAR – Jake Delhomme – 12/20, 122 yards, 3 TD, 2 INT

**Top rushers**

- JAX – Fred Taylor – 22 rushes, 71 yards
- CAR – Stephen Davis – 22 rushes, 111 yards

**Top receivers**

- JAX – Jermaine Lewis – 3 receptions, 90 yards, TD
- CAR – Steve Smith Sr. – 4 receptions, 44 yards, TD

==== Week 2: vs. Buffalo Bills ====
Week Two: Buffalo Bills at Jacksonville Jaguars – Game summary

Quarter	1	2	3	4	Total
**Bills**	14	7	14	3	**38**
**Jaguars**	0	7	3	7	**17**

at Alltel Stadium, Jacksonville, Florida

- Date: September 14, 2003
- Game time: 1:00 p.m. EST
- Game weather: 86 °F (30 °C)
- Game attendance: 58,613
- TV announcers (CBS): Don Criqui and Steve Tasker
- Recap, Game Book

Game information

**First quarter**

- BUF – Travis Henry 1-yard run (Rian Lindell kick), 11:17. Bills 7–0. **Drive: 7 plays, 49 yards, 3:43.**
- BUF – Travis Henry 6-yard run (Rian Lindell kick), 4:50. Bills 14–0. **Drive: 9 plays, 68 yards, 4:45.**

**Second quarter**

- JAX – Mark Brunell 1-yard run (Seth Marler kick), 9:29. Bills 14–7. **Drive: 9 plays, 44 yards, 3:52.**
- BUF – Bobby Shaw 54-yard pass from Drew Bledsoe (Rian Lindell kick), 1:37. Bills 21–7. **Drive: 2 plays, 62 yards, 0:16.**

**Third quarter**

- JAX – Seth Marler 44-yard field goal, 12:54. Bills 21–10. **Drive: 5 plays, 33 yards, 2:06.**
- BUF – Eric Moulds 36-yard pass from Drew Bledsoe (Rian Lindell kick), 8:03. Bills 28–10. **Drive: 10 plays, 78 yards, 4:51.**
- BUF – Travis Henry 4-yard run (Rian Lindell kick), 0:59. Bills 35–10. **Drive: 7 plays, 99 yards, 3:46.**

**Fourth quarter**

- BUF – Rian Lindell 27-yard field goal, 5:11. Bills 38–10. **Drive: 9 plays, 35 yards, 5:19.**
- JAX – George Wrighster 5-yard pass from Byron Leftwich (Seth Marler kick), 1:53. Bills 38–17. **Drive: 9 plays, 90 yards, 3:18.**

Top passers

- BUF – Drew Bledsoe – 19/25, 314 yards, 2 TD
- JAX – Mark Brunell – 19/32, 122 yards

Top rushers

- BUF – Travis Henry – 21 rushes, 26 yards, 3 TD
- JAX – Fred Taylor – 14 rushes, 71 yards

Top receivers

- BUF – Eric Moulds – 7 receptions, 133 yards, TD
- JAX – Kyle Brady – 5 receptions, 42 yards

==== Week 3: at Indianapolis Colts ====
Week Three: Jacksonville Jaguars at Indianapolis Colts

Quarter	1	2	3	4	Total
Jaguars	0	3	0	10	**13**
**Colts**	0	0	17	6	**23**

at RCA Dome, Indianapolis, Indiana

- Game time: 1:00 p.m. EDT
- Game weather: None (domed stadium)
- Game attendance: 55,770
- Referee: Bernie Kukar
- TV announcers (CBS): Don Criqui and Steve Tasker
- Recap, Game Book

Game information

**First quarter**

- No scoring plays.

**Second quarter**

- JAX – Seth Marler 49-yard field goal, 10:11. Jaguars 3–0. **Drive: 6 plays, 17 yards, 2:08.**

**Third quarter**

- IND – Reggie Wayne 28-yard pass from Peyton Manning (Mike Vanderjagt kick), 10:02. Colts 7–3. **Drive: 9 plays, 66 yards, 4:58.**
- IND – Reggie Wayne 4-yard pass from Peyton Manning (Mike Vanderjagt kick), 5:22. Colts 14–3. **Drive: 7 plays, 52 yards, 3:11.**
- IND – Mike Vanderjagt 46-yard field goal, 3:37. Colts 17–3. **Drive: 4 plays, 6 yards, 1:33.**

**Fourth quarter**

- IND – Mike Vanderjagt 36-yard field goal, 10:17. Colts 20–3. **Drive: 7 plays, 23 yards, 3:29.**
- JAX – Seth Marler 37-yard field goal, 8:57. Colts 20–6. **Drive: 5 plays, 40 yards, 1:20.**
- IND – Mike Vanderjagt 29-yard field goal, 2:29. Colts 23–6. **Drive: 10 plays, 51 yards, 6:28.**
- JAX – Matthew Hatchette 8-yard pass from Byron Leftwich (Seth Marler kick), 1:02. Colts 23–13. **Drive: 5 plays, 32 yards, 1:27.**

Top passers

- JAX – Mark Brunell – 12/23, 90 yards
- IND – Peyton Manning – 21/33, 216 yards, 2 TD, INT

Top rushers

- JAX – Fred Taylor – 17 rushes, 126 yards
- IND – Edgerrin James – 27 rushes, 76 yards

Top receivers

- JAX – Matthew Hatchette – 4 receptions, 45 yards, TD
- IND – Reggie Wayne – 10 receptions, 141 yards, 2 TD

After being down 3–0 at halftime, the Colts scored 17 third quarter points followed by six points in the fourth quarter to beat Jacksonville 23-13 and improve to 3–0. A standout moment from the game occurred when Colts' rookie DB Mike Doss caused a fumble by Jaguars' RB Fred Taylor. Doss reportedly quipped, "Hey, Fred, you forgot something." In retaliation, Taylor told reporters ahead of their next encounter, "I'm going to bust his (butt). I'm going to punish him."

==== Week 4: at Houston Texans ====
Week Four: Jacksonville Jaguars at Houston Texans – Game summary

Quarter	1	2	3	4	Total
Jaguars	3	7	10	0	**20**
**Texans**	7	7	3	7	**24**

at Reliant Stadium, Houston, Texas

- Date: September 28, 2003
- Game time: 12:00 p.m. CDT
- Game weather: 79 °F (26 °C)
- Game attendance: 70,041
- Referee: Tony Corrente
- TV announcers (CBS): Don Criqui and Steve Tasker
- Recap, Game Book

Game information

**First quarter**

- HOU – Stacey Mack 5-yard run (Kris Brown kick), 9:00. Texans 7–0. **Drive: 11 plays, 69 yards, 5:35.**
- JAX – Seth Marler 29-yard field goal, 3:19. Texans 7–3. **Drive: 11 plays, 51 yards, 4:13.**

**Second quarter**

- HOU – Jabar Gaffney 24-yard pass from David Carr (Kris Brown kick), 14:11. Texans 14–3. **Drive: 8 plays, 53 yards, 3:59.**
- JAX – Fred Taylor 1-yard run (Seth Marler kick), 6:46. Texans 14–10. **Drive: 7 plays, 48 yards, 3:25.**

**Third quarter**

- HOU – Kris Brown 48-yard field goal, 13:45. Texans 17–10. **Drive: 4 plays, -1 yards, 0:55.**
- JAX – Troy Edwards 84-yard pass from Byron Leftwich (Seth Marler kick), 11:04. Tied 17–17. **Drive: 2 plays, 84 yards, 0:17.**
- JAX – Seth Marler 20-yard field goal, 4:06. Jaguars 20–17. **Drive: 9 plays, 66 yards, 3:36.**

**Fourth quarter**

- HOU – David Carr 1-yard run (Kris Brown kick), 0:02. Texans 24–20. **Drive: 10 plays, 41 yards, 3:20.**

**Top passers**

- JAX – Byron Leftwich – 17/36, 231 yards, TD, 3 INT
- HOU – David Carr – 23/36, 234 yards, TD, INT

**Top rushers**

- JAX – Fred Taylor – 19 rushes, 67 yards, TD
- HOU – Domanick Davis – 16 rushes, 53 yards

**Top receivers**

- JAX – Troy Edwards – 3 receptions, 111 yards, TD
- HOU – Andre Johnson – 8 receptions, 97 yards

==== Week 5: vs. San Diego Chargers ====
Week Five: San Diego Chargers at Jacksonville Jaguars – Game summary

Quarter	1	2	3	4	Total
Chargers	0	7	0	14	**21**
**Jaguars**	7	3	10	7	**27**

at Alltel Stadium, Jacksonville, Florida

- Date: October 5, 2003
- Game time: 1:05 p.m. EDT
- Game weather: 84 °F (29 °C)
- Game attendance: 48,954
- Referee: Tom White
- TV announcers (CBS): Ian Eagle and Solomon Wilcots
- Box score, Game Book

Game information

**First quarter**

- JAX – Fred Taylor 1-yard run (Seth Marler kick), 5:43. Jaguars 7–0. **Drive: 14 plays, 62 yards, 5:46.**

**Second quarter**

- SDG – David Boston 46-yard pass from Drew Brees (Steve Christie kick), 9:56. Tied 7–7. **Drive: 4 plays, 66 yards, 2:00.**
- JAX – Seth Marler 53-yard field goal, 0:00. Jaguars 10–7. **Drive: 7 plays, 54 yards, 3:12.**

**Third quarter**

- JAX – Troy Edwards 18-yard pass from Byron Leftwich (Seth Marler kick), 6:39. Jaguars 17–7. **Drive: 11 plays, 90 yards, 5:44.**
- JAX – Seth Marler 27-yard field goal, 2:38. Jaguars 20–7. **Drive: 4 plays, 8 yards, 1:49.**

**Fourth quarter**

- SDG – Eric Parker 33-yard pass from Drew Brees (Steve Christie kick), 4:19. Jaguars 20–14. **Drive: 5 plays, 71 yards, 1:51.**
- JAX – Fred Taylor 60-yard pass from Byron Leftwich (Seth Marler kick), 1:47. Jaguars 27–14. **Drive: 6 plays, 73 yards, 2:32.**
- SDG – David Boston 13-yard pass from Drew Brees (Steve Christie kick), 0:20. Jaguars 27–21. **Drive: 10 plays, 69 yards, 1:27.**

**Top passers**

- SDG – Drew Brees – 24/41, 296 yards, 3 TD
- JAX – Byron Leftwich – 19/28, 336 yards, 2 TD

**Top rushers**

- SDG – LaDainian Tomlinson – 10 rushes, 38 yards
- JAX – Fred Taylor – 27 rushes, 87 yards, TD

**Top receivers**

- SDG – David Boston – 14 receptions, 181 yards, 2 TD
- JAX – Jimmy Smith – 8 receptions, 137 yards

==== Week 6: vs. Miami Dolphins ====
Week Six: Miami Dolphins at Jacksonville Jaguars – Game summary

Quarter	1	2	3	4	Total
**Dolphins**	10	0	0	14	**24**
**Jaguars**	0	3	7	0	**10**

at Alltel Stadium, Jacksonville, Florida

- Date: October 12, 2003
- Game time: 1:00 p.m. EDT
- Game weather: 75 °F (24 °C)
- Game attendance: 66,437
- Referee: Walt Coleman
- Box score, Game Book

Game information

**First quarter**

- MIA – Ricky Williams 14-yard run (Olindo Mare kick), 10:33. Dolphins 7–0. **Drive: 6 plays, 41 yards, 2:59.**
- MIA – Olindo Mare 51-yard field goal, 3:12. Dolphins 10–0. **Drive: 8 plays, 25 yards, 3:19.**

**Second quarter**

- JAX – Seth Marler 20-yard field goal, 11:24. Dolphins 10–3. **Drive: 15 plays, 78 yards, 2:57.**

**Third quarter**

- JAX – Byron Leftwich 8-yard run (Seth Marler kick), 1:07. Tied 10–10. **Drive: 5 plays, 80 yards, 2:57.**

**Fourth quarter**

- MIA – Randy McMichael 2-yard fumble recovery (Olindo Mare kick), 11:29. Dolphins 17–10. **Drive: 11 plays, 63 yards, 4:38.**
- MIA – Sam Madison 29-yard interception return (Olindo Mare kick), 1:28. Dolphins 24–10.

**Top passers**

- MIA – Jay Fiedler – 14/27, 147 yards, INT
- JAX – Byron Leftwich – 24/42, 256 yards, 3 INT

**Top rushers**

- MIA – Ricky Williams – 19 rushes, 75 yards, TD
- JAX – Fred Taylor – 16 rushes, 35 yards

**Top receivers**

- MIA – Obafemi Ayanbadejo – 6 receptions, 42 yards
- JAX – Jimmy Smith – 6 receptions, 65 yards

==== Week 8: vs. Tennessee Titans ====
Week Eight: Tennessee Titans at Jacksonville Jaguars – Game summary

Quarter	1	2	3	4	Total
**Titans**	10	10	7	3	**30**
Jaguars	0	10	0	7	**17**

at Alltel Stadium, Jacksonville, Florida

- Date: October 26, 2003
- Game time: 1:00 p.m. EST
- Game weather: 80 °F (27 °C)
- Game attendance: 55,918
- Referee: Terry McAulay
- TV announcers (CBS): Ian Eagle and Solomon Wilcots
- Recap, Game Book

Game information

**First quarter**

- TEN – Gary Anderson 43-yard field goal, 12:10. Titans 3–0. **Drive: 6 plays, 52 yards, 2:50.**
- TEN – Eddie George 1-yard run (Gary Anderson kick), 4:33. Titans 10–0. **Drive: 9 plays, 71 yards, 5:42.**

**Second quarter**

- JAX – Seth Marler 49-yard field goal, 14:17. Titans 10–3. **Drive: 9 plays, 45 yards, 5:16.**
- TEN – Tyrone Calico 7-yard pass from Steve McNair (Gary Anderson kick), 7:26. Titans 17–3. **Drive: 8 plays, 29 yards, 5:14.**
- JAX – Jimmy Smith 49-yard pass from Byron Leftwich (Seth Marler kick), 3:38. Titans 17–10. **Drive: 2 plays, 58 yards, 0:49.**
- TEN – Gary Anderson 43-yard field goal, 0:01. Titans 20–10. **Drive: 11 plays, 45 yards, 3:37.**

**Third quarter**

- TEN – Eddie George 1-yard run (Gary Anderson kick), 8:36. Titans 27–10. **Drive: 3 plays, 7 yards, 1:30.**

**Fourth quarter**

- TEN – Gary Anderson 33-yard field goal, 1:47. Titans 30–10. **Drive: 17 plays, 65 yards, 11:14.**
- JAX – George Wrighster 5-yard pass from David Garrard (Seth Marler kick), 0:05. Titans 30–17. **Drive: 12 plays, 86 yards, 1:42.**

Top passers

- TEN – Steve McNair – 21/27, 187 yards, TD, INT
- JAX – Byron Leftwich – 15/28, 158 yards, TD, 3 INT

Top rushers

- TEN – Eddie George – 27 rushes, 88 yards, 2 TD
- JAX – Fred Taylor – 9 rushes, 48 yards

Top receivers

- TEN – Drew Bennett – 4 receptions, 48 yards
- JAX – Troy Edwards – 4 receptions, 63 yards

==== Week 9: at Baltimore Ravens ====
Week Nine: Jacksonville Jaguars at Baltimore Ravens – Game summary

Quarter	1	2	3	4	Total
Jaguars	0	3	7	7	**17**
**Ravens**	7	0	6	11	**24**

at M&T Bank Stadium, Baltimore, Maryland

- Date: November 2, 2003
- Game time: 1:00 p.m. EST
- Game weather: Sunny, 71 °F (22 °C)
- Game attendance: 69,486
- Referee: Walt Anderson
- Recap, Game Book

Game information

**First quarter**

- BAL – Todd Heap 1-yard pass from Kyle Boller (Matt Stover kick), 13:34. Ravens 7–0. **Drive: 4 plays, 59 yards, 1:26.**

**Second quarter**

- JAX – Seth Marler 23-yard field goal, 9:57. Ravens 7–3. **Drive: 14 plays, 83 yards, 8:18.**

**Third quarter**

- BAL – Matt Stover 23-yard field goal, 9:57. Ravens 10–3. **Drive: 7 plays, 52 yards, 3:00.**
- JAX – Akin Ayodele 15-yard fumble return (Seth Marler kick), 3:28. Tied 10–10.
- BAL – Matt Stover 32-yard field goal, 0:18. Ravens 13–10. **Drive: 8 plays, 27 yards, 3:10.**

**Fourth quarter**

- BAL – Matt Stover 23-yard field goal, 10:30. Ravens 16–10. **Drive: 7 plays, 20 yards, 4:23.**
- BAL – Chester Taylor 29-yard run (pass succeeded), 7:33. Ravens 24–10. **Drive: 3 plays, 27 yards, 1:25.**
- JAX – David Allen 5-yard pass from Byron Leftwich (Seth Marler kick), 3:11. Ravens 24–17. **Drive: 12 plays, 73 yards, 4:22.**

**Top passers**

- JAX – Byron Leftwich – 22/34, 208 yards, TD, INT
- BAL – Kyle Boller – 10/23, 156 yards, TD, INT

**Top rushers**

- JAX – Fred Taylor – 22 rushes, 78 yards
- BAL – Jamal Lewis – 21 rushes, 68 yards

**Top receivers**

- JAX – Jimmy Smith – 5 receptions, 72 yards
- BAL – Travis Taylor – 3 receptions, 64 yards

==== Week 10: vs. Indianapolis Colts ====
Week Ten: Indianapolis Colts at Jacksonville Jaguars – Game summary

Quarter	1	2	3	4	Total
Colts	7	13	0	3	**23**
**Jaguars**	7	0	7	14	**28**

at Alltel Stadium, Jacksonville, Florida

- Date: November 9, 2003
- Game time: 1:00 p.m. EST
- Game weather: 62 °F (17 °C)
- Game attendance: 45,037
- Referee: Ron Winter
- TV announcers (CBS): Ian Eagle and Solomon Wilcots
- Recap, Game Book

Game information

**First quarter**

- IND – Marvin Harrison 30-yard pass from Peyton Manning (Mike Vanderjagt kick), 10:07. Colts 7–0. **Drive: 7 plays, 52 yards, 2:31.**
- JAX – Fred Taylor 5-yard run (Seth Marler kick), 1:19. Tied 7–7. **Drive: 7 plays, 43 yards, 4:06.**

**Second quarter**

- IND – Mike Vanderjagt 27-yard field goal, 11:08. Colts 10–7. **Drive: 13 plays, 61 yards, 5:11.**
- IND – Mike Vanderjagt 26-yard field goal, 6:51. Colts 13–7. **Drive: 6 plays, 57 yards, 2:22.**
- IND – Marcus Pollard 13-yard pass from Peyton Manning (Mike Vanderjagt kick), 0:28. Colts 20–7. **Drive: 11 plays, 62 yards, 4:21.**

**Third quarter**

- JAX – Byron Leftwich 4-yard run (Seth Marler kick), 8:26. Colts 20–14. **Drive: 13 plays, 80 yards, 6:34.**

**Fourth quarter**

- JAX – Jimmy Smith 43-yard pass from Byron Leftwich (Seth Marler kick), 11:32. Jaguars 21–20. **Drive: 7 plays, 93 yards, 3:59.**
- IND – Mike Vanderjagt 27-yard field goal, 9:44. Colts 23–20. **Drive: 5 plays, 70 yards, 1:48.**
- JAX – Fred Taylor 32-yard run (Seth Marler kick), 1:08. Jaguars 28–23. **Drive: 2 plays, 31 yards, 0:20.**

Top passers

- IND – Peyton Manning – 28/45, 347 yards, 2 TD, 2 INT
- JAX – Byron Leftwich – 12/22, 179 yards, TD

Top rushers

- IND – Edgerrin James – 15 rushes, 44 yards
- JAX – Fred Taylor – 28 rushes, 152 yards, 2 TD

Top receivers

- IND – Marcus Pollard – 3 receptions, 92 yards, TD
- JAX – Jimmy Smith – 4 receptions, 87 yards, TD

By the start of the fourth quarter, the Jaguars rallied with two touchdowns to take the lead. On the next possession, Peyton Manning connected with Marcus Pollard, who raced 70 yards to set up a go–ahead field goal. The Jaguars then moved deep into Colts' territory, but a fumbled field goal snap by punter/holder Mark Royals thwarted their efforts. After the Colts went three–and–out and a strong punt return set Jacksonville up at the Indianapolis 31–yard line, Fred Taylor made a 32–yard run, evading Mike Doss as he fell, to score a touchdown and put the Jaguars ahead with just a minute remaining. Manning's attempt to respond ended in an interception, sealing the Jaguars' first–ever victory over the Colts in a surprising upset. After the game, Doss remarked, "I guess you'd have to say he got the final word today." Taylor expressed that his frustration arose from Doss forcing his head to the ground after he recovered the fumble, expressing "I felt he truly disrespected me,"

==== Week 11: at Tennessee Titans ====
Week Eleven: Jacksonville Jaguars at Tennessee Titans – Game summary

Quarter	1	2	3	4	Total
Jaguars	0	0	0	3	**3**
**Titans**	3	7	0	0	**10**

at The Coliseum, Nashville, Tennessee

- Date: November 16, 2003
- Game time: 12:00 p.m. CST
- Game weather: Cloudy & slight rain, 60 °F (16 °C)
- Game attendance: 68,809
- Referee: Ron Blum
- TV announcers (CBS): Gus Johnson and Brent Jones
- Recap, Game Book

Game information

**First quarter**

- TEN – Gary Anderson 33-yard field goal, 6:21. Titans 3–0. **Drive: 10 plays, 45 yards, 4:35.**

**Second quarter**

- TEN – Justin McCareins 5-yard pass from Steve McNair (Gary Anderson kick), 11:38. Titans 10–0. **Drive: 9 plays, 65 yards, 5:01.**

**Third quarter**

- No scoring plays.

**Fourth quarter**

- JAX – Seth Marler 39-yard field goal, 7:51. Titans 10–3. **Drive: 11 plays, 36 yards, 5:29.**

Top passers

- JAX – Byron Leftwich – 15/31, 151 yards, 2 INT
- TEN – Steve McNair – 13/25, 166 yards, TD, INT

Top rushers

- JAX – Fred Taylor – 14 rushes, 65 yards
- TEN – Eddie George – 20 rushes, 73 yards

Top receivers

- JAX – Troy Edwards – 6 receptions, 67 yards
- TEN – Derrick Mason – 5 receptions, 98 yards

==== Week 12: at New York Jets ====
Week Twelve: Jacksonville Jaguars at New York Jets – Game summary

Quarter	1	2	3	4	Total
Jaguars	0	3	0	7	**10**
**Titans**	3	3	0	10	**16**

at The Meadowlands, East Rutherford, New Jersey

- Date: November 12, 2003
- Game time: 1:00 p.m. EST
- Game weather: Clear, 53 °F (12 °C)
- Game attendance: 77,614
- Referee: Bill Carollo
- Recap, Game Book

Game information

**First quarter**

- NYJ – Doug Brien 36-yard field goal, 5:20. Jets 3–0. **Drive: 7 plays, 46 yards, 3:45.**

**Second quarter**

- JAX – Seth Marler 23-yard field goal, 3:38. Tied 3–3. **Drive: 11 plays, 64 yards, 5:53.**

**Third quarter**

- No scoring plays.

**Fourth quarter**

- NYJ – Doug Brien 35-yard field goal, 12:08. Jets 6–3. **Drive: 12 plays, 48 yards, 5:37.**
- JAX – Chris Fuamatu-Ma'afala 1-yard run (Seth Marler kick), 4:24. Jaguars 10–6. **Drive: 13 plays, 74 yards, 7:44.**
- NYJ – Santana Moss 3-yard pass from Chad Pennington (Doug Brien kick), 0:26. Jets 13–10. **Drive: 11 plays, 94 yards, 2:34.**

Top passers

- JAX – Byron Leftwich – 17/33, 172 yards, INT
- NYJ – Chad Pennington – 25/39, 236 yards, TD, INT

Top rushers

- JAX – Fred Taylor – 32 rushes, 119 yards
- NYJ – Curtis Martin – 20 rushes, 56 yards

Top receivers

- JAX – Kevin Johnson – 5 receptions, 77 yards
- NYJ – Anthony Becht – 5 receptions, 63 yards

==== Week 13: vs. Tampa Bay Buccaneers ====
Week Thirteen: Tampa Bay Buccaneers at Jacksonville Jaguars – Game summary

Quarter	1	2	3	4	Total
Buccaneers	0	10	0	0	**10**
**Jaguars**	0	10	0	7	**17**

at Alltel Stadium, Jacksonville, Florida

- Date: November 30, 2003
- Game time: 8:30 p.m. EST
- Game weather: 46 °F (8 °C)
- Game attendance: 60,543
- Referee: Tony Corrente
- Recap, Game Book

Game information

**First quarter**

- No scoring plays.

**Second quarter**

- JAX – Kyle Brady 10-yard pass from Byron Leftwich (Seth Marler kick), 13:46. Jaguars 7–0. **Drive: 7 plays, 40 yards, 3:09.**
- TB – Thomas Jones 5-yard run (Martin Gramatica kick), 8:12. Tied 7–7. **Drive: 11 plays, 56 yards, 5:34.**
- TB – Martin Gramatica 47-yard field goal, 5:05. Buccaneers 10–7. **Drive: 6 plays, 10 yards, 2:16.**
- JAX – Seth Marler 28-yard field goal, o:12. Tied 10–10. **Drive: 11 plays, 60 yards, 4:53.**

**Third quarter**

- No scoring plays.

**Fourth quarter**

- JAX – Jimmy Smith 48-yard pass from Byron Leftwich (Seth Marler kick), 10:23. Jaguars 17–10. **Drive: 2 plays, 74 yards, 0:17.**

Top passers

- TB – Brad Johnson – 21/38, 156 yards, INT
- JAX – Byron Leftwich – 20/34, 224 yards, 2 TD

Top rushers

- TB – Michael Pittman – 10 rushes, 60 yards
- JAX – Fred Taylor – 29 rushes, 118 yards

Top receivers

- TB – Keenan McCardell – 8 receptions, 74 yards
- JAX – Jimmy Smith – 10 receptions, 136 yards, TD

==== Week 14: vs. Houston Texans ====
Week Fourteen: Houston Texans at Jacksonville Jaguars – Game summary

Quarter	1	2	3	4	Total
Texans	0	0	0	0	**0**
**Jaguars**	7	10	0	10	**27**

at Alltel Stadium, Jacksonville, Florida

- Date: December 7, 2003
- Game time: 1:00 p.m. EST
- Game weather: 56 °F (13 °C)
- Game attendance: 43,363
- Referee: Jeff Triplette
- TV: CBS
- Recap, Game Book

Game information

**First quarter**

- JAX – Jimmy Smith 32-yard pass from Byron Leftwich (Seth Marler kick), 5:24. Jaguars 7–0. **Drive: 6 plays, 63 yards, 3:03.**

**Second quarter**

- JAX – Seth Marler 35-yard field goal, 3:24. Jaguars 10–0. **Drive: 11 plays, 36 yards, 4:34.**
- JAX – Fred Taylor 2-yard run (Seth Marler kick), 0:15. Jaguars 17–0. **Drive: 9 plays, 84 yards, 1:34.**

**Third quarter**

- No scoring plays

**Fourth quarter**

- JAX – LaBrandon Toefield 1-yard run (Seth Marler kick), 10:21. Jaguars 24–0. **Drive: 5 plays, 80 yards, 2:43.**
- JAX – Seth Marler 28-yard field goal, 1:55. Jaguars 27–0. **Drive: 13 plays, 72 yards, 7:10.**

**Top passers**

- HOU – Dave Ragone – 11/23, 71 yards, INT
- JAX – Byron Leftwich – 18/29, 194 yards, TD

**Top rushers**

- HOU – Tony Hollings – 18 rushes, 19 yards
- JAX – Fred Taylor – 24 rushes, 163 yards, TD

**Top receivers**

- HOU – Billy Miller – 4 receptions, 29 yards
- JAX – Jimmy Smith – 3 receptions, 58 yards, TD

==== Week 15: at New England Patriots ====
Week Fifteen: Jacksonville Jaguars at New England Patriots – Game summary

Quarter	1	2	3	4	Total
Jaguars	3	3	0	7	**13**
**Patriots**	7	6	0	14	**27**

at Gillette Stadium, Foxborough, Massachusetts

- Date: December 14, 2003
- Game time: 1:00 p.m. EST
- Game weather: Cloudy, cold, snow expected, 25 °F (−4 °C)
- Game attendance: 68,436
- Referee: Walt Anderson
- TV announcers (CBS): Greg Gumbel, Phil Simms and Armen Keteyian
- Recap, Game Book

Game information

**First quarter**

- NE – Daniel Graham 27-yard pass from Tom Brady (Adam Vinatieri kick), 10:02. Patriots 7–0. **Drive: 9 plays, 66 yards, 4:58.**
- JAX – Seth Marler 24-yard field goal, 7:19. Patriots 7–3. **Drive: 5 plays, 71 yards, 2:43.**

**Second quarter**

- NE – Adam Vinatieri 22-yard field goal, 14:13. Patriots 10–3. **Drive: 15 plays, 59 yards, 8:06.**
- JAX – Seth Marler 23-yard field goal, 7:18. Patriots 10–6. **Drive: 13 plays, 68 yards, 6:55.**
- NE – Adam Vinatieri 31-yard field goal, 2:30. Patriots 13–6. **Drive: 6 plays, 31 yards, 2:12.**

**Third quarter**

- No scoring plays.

**Fourth quarter**

- NE – Troy Brown 10-yard pass from Tom Brady (Adam Vinatieri kick), 10:57. Patriots 20–6. **Drive: 8 plays, 35 yards, 3:52.**
- NE – Antowain Smith 1-yard run (Adam Vinatieri kick), 4:18. Patriots 27–6. **Drive: 3 plays, 3 yards, 1:27.**
- JAX – Kevin Johnson 27-yard pass from Byron Leftwich (Seth Marler kick), 3:22. Patriots 27–13. **Drive: 5 plays, 53 yards, 0:56.**

Top passers

- JAX – Byron Leftwich – 21/40, 288 yards, TD, 2 INT
- NE – Tom Brady – 22/34, 228 yards, 2 TD

Top rushers

- JAX – Fred Taylor – 16 rushes, 57 yards
- NE – Antowain Smith – 17 rushes, 39 yards, TD

Top receivers

- JAX – Kevin Johnson – 5 receptions, 87 yards, TD
- NE – Daniel Graham – 5 receptions, 69 yards, TD

==== Week 16: vs. New Orleans Saints ====
Week Sixteen: New Orleans Saints at Jacksonville Jaguars – Game summary

Quarter	1	2	3	4	Total
Saints	3	7	3	6	**19**
**Jaguars**	0	17	3	0	**20**

at Alltel Stadium, Jacksonville, Florida

- Date: December 21, 2003
- Game time: 1:00 p.m. EST
- Game weather: 52 °F (11 °C)
- Game attendance: 49,207
- Referee: Gerry Austin
- TV announcers (Fox): Curt Menefee and Tim Green
- Recap, Game Book

Game information

First quarter

- NO – John Carney 33-yard field goal, 4:19. Saints 3-0. **Drive: 12 plays, 58 yards, 5:00.**

Second quarter

- JAX – Seth Marler 43-yard field goal, 13:30. Tied 3-3. **Drive: 12 plays, 45 yards, 5:49.**
- JAX – LaBrandon Toefield 14-yard pass from Byron Leftwich (Seth Marler kick), 6:54. Jaguars 10-3. **Drive: 5 plays, 62 yards, 2:00.**
- NO – Boo Williams 2-yard pass from Aaron Brooks (John Carney kick), 2:55. Tied 10-10. **Drive: 3 plays, 8 yards, 1:23.**
- JAX – Fred Taylor 1-yard run (Seth Marler kick), 0:21. Jaguars 17-10. **Drive: 7 plays, 70 yards, 2:34.**

Third quarter

- NO – John Carney 38-yard field goal, 3:32. Jaguars 17-13. **Drive: 7 plays, 55 yards, 3:46.**
- JAX – Seth Marler 35-yard field goal, 0:09. Jaguars 20-13. **Drive: 7 plays, 46 yards, 3:23.**

Fourth quarter

- NO – Jerome Pathon 75-yard pass play by Aaron Brooks (kick failed), 0:00. Jaguars 20-19. **Drive: 2 plays, 75 yards, 0:11.**

Top passers

- NO – Aaron Brooks – 22/38, 296 yards, 2 TD
- JAX – Byron Leftwich – 9/17, 131 yards, TD, 2 INT

Top rushers

- NO – Deuce McAllister – 21 carries, 50 yards
- JAX – Fred Taylor – 34 carries, 194 yards, TD

Top receivers

- NO – Jerome Pathon – 4 receptions, 65 yards, TD
- JAX – Fred Taylor – 2 receptions, 31 yards

==== Week 17: at Atlanta Falcons ====
Week Seventeen: Jacksonville Jaguars at Atlanta Falcons – Game summary

Quarter	1	2	3	4	Total
Jaguars	7	0	7	0	**14**
**Falcons**	14	7	0	0	**21**

at Georgia Dome, Atlanta, Georgia

- Date: December 28, 2003
- Game time: 1:00 p.m. EST
- Game weather: Cloudy, cold, snow expected, 25 °F (−4 °C)
- Game attendance: 70,266
- Referee: None (indoor stadium0
- Recap, Game Book

Game information

**First quarter**

- ATL – T.J. Duckett 2-yard run (Jay Feely kick), 8:41. Falcons 7–0. **Drive: 10 plays, 55 yards, 4:44.**
- JAX – Troy Edwards 15-yard pass from Byron Leftwich (Seth Marler kick), 3:41. Tied 7–7. **Drive: 9 plays, 62 yards, 5:00.**
- ATL – Peerless Price 44-yard pass from Michael Vick (Jay Feely kick), 0:23. Falcons 14–7. **Drive: 6 plays, 85 yards, 3:18.**

**Second quarter**

- ATL – Justin Griffith 1-yard pass from Michael Vick (Jay Feely kick), 0:07. Falcons 21–7. **Drive: 11 plays, 80 yards, 3:50.**

**Third quarter**

- JAX – LaBrandon Toefield 4-yard run (Seth Marler kick), 2:59. Falcons 21–14. **Drive: 7 plays, 42 yards, 4:02.**

**Fourth quarter**

- No scoring plays.

Top passers

- JAX – Byron Leftwich – 19/32, 167 yards, TD
- ATL – Michael Vick – 12/22, 180 yards, 2 TD, INT

Top rushers

- JAX – Fred Taylor – 22 rushes, 121 yards
- ATL – T.J. Duckett – 22 rushes, 96 yards, TD

Top receivers

- JAX – Jimmy Smith – 4 receptions, 33 yards
- ATL – Peerless Price – 4 receptions, 74 yards, TD

=== Standings ===
==== Division ====
AFC South
	W	L	T	PCT	DIV	CONF	PF	PA	STK
^{(3)} Indianapolis Colts	12	4	0	.750	5–1	9–3	447	336	W1
^{(5)} Tennessee Titans	12	4	0	.750	4–2	8–4	435	324	W3
Jacksonville Jaguars	5	11	0	.313	2–4	3–9	276	331	L1
Houston Texans	5	11	0	.313	1–5	3–9	255	380	L4

==== Conference ====
AFC
#	Team	Division	W	L	T	PCT	DIV	CONF	SOS	SOV	STK
**Division leaders**
1	New England Patriots	East	14	2	0	.875	5–1	11–1	.484	.492	W12
2	Kansas City Chiefs	West	13	3	0	.813	5–1	10–2	.418	.385	W1
3 (Note: Indianapolis finished ahead of Tennessee based upon head-to-head sweep.)	Indianapolis Colts	South	12	4	0	.750	5–1	9–3	.492	.448	W1
4	Baltimore Ravens	North	10	6	0	.625	4–2	7–5	.457	.400	W2
**Wild cards**
5	Tennessee Titans	South	12	4	0	.750	4–2	8–4	.473	.401	W3
6 (Note: Denver finished as the second Wild Card instead of Miami based upon better conference record.)	Denver Broncos	West	10	6	0	.625	5–1	9–3	.500	.406	L1
**Did not qualify for the postseason**
7	Miami Dolphins	East	10	6	0	.625	4–2	7–5	.512	.388	W2
8	Cincinnati Bengals	North	8	8	0	.500	3–3	6–6	.457	.469	L2
9 (Note: Pittsburgh finished ahead of Buffalo based upon conference win percentage. Division tiebreak was initially used to eliminate New York Jets.)	Pittsburgh Steelers	North	6	10	0	.375	3–3	5–7	.500	.365	L1
10 (Note: Buffalo finished ahead of New York Jets based upon better division record.)	Buffalo Bills	East	6	10	0	.375	2–4	4–8	.570	.438	L3
11	New York Jets	East	6	10	0	.375	1–5	6–6	.527	.396	L2
12 (Note: Jacksonville finished ahead of Cleveland based upon better record against common opponents (Jacksonville was 2–3 against Cleveland’s 0–5 versus New England, Indianapolis, Baltimore and San Diego). Division tiebreaker was initially used to eliminate Houston.) (Note: Jacksonville finished ahead of Houston based upon better conference record.)	Jacksonville Jaguars	South	5	11	0	.313	2–4	3–9	.543	.453	L1
13 (Note: Cleveland finished ahead of Houston based upon better record against common opponents (Cleveland was 1–4 against Houston‘s 0–5 versus New England, Kansas City, Indianapolis and Cincinnati.))	Cleveland Browns	North	5	11	0	.313	2–4	3–9	.539	.363	W1
14	Houston Texans	South	5	11	0	.313	1–5	3–9	.570	.463	L4
15 (Note: Oakland finished ahead of San Diego based upon conference record)	Oakland Raiders	West	4	12	0	.250	1–5	3–9	.516	.484	L2
16	San Diego Chargers	West	4	12	0	.250	1–5	2–10	.504	.359	W1
**Tiebreakers** (Note: When breaking ties for three or more teams under the NFL's rules, they are first broken within divisions, then comparing only the highest-ranked remaining team from each division.)
