= Chris Jones (basketball, born 1991) =

American basketball player (born 1991)

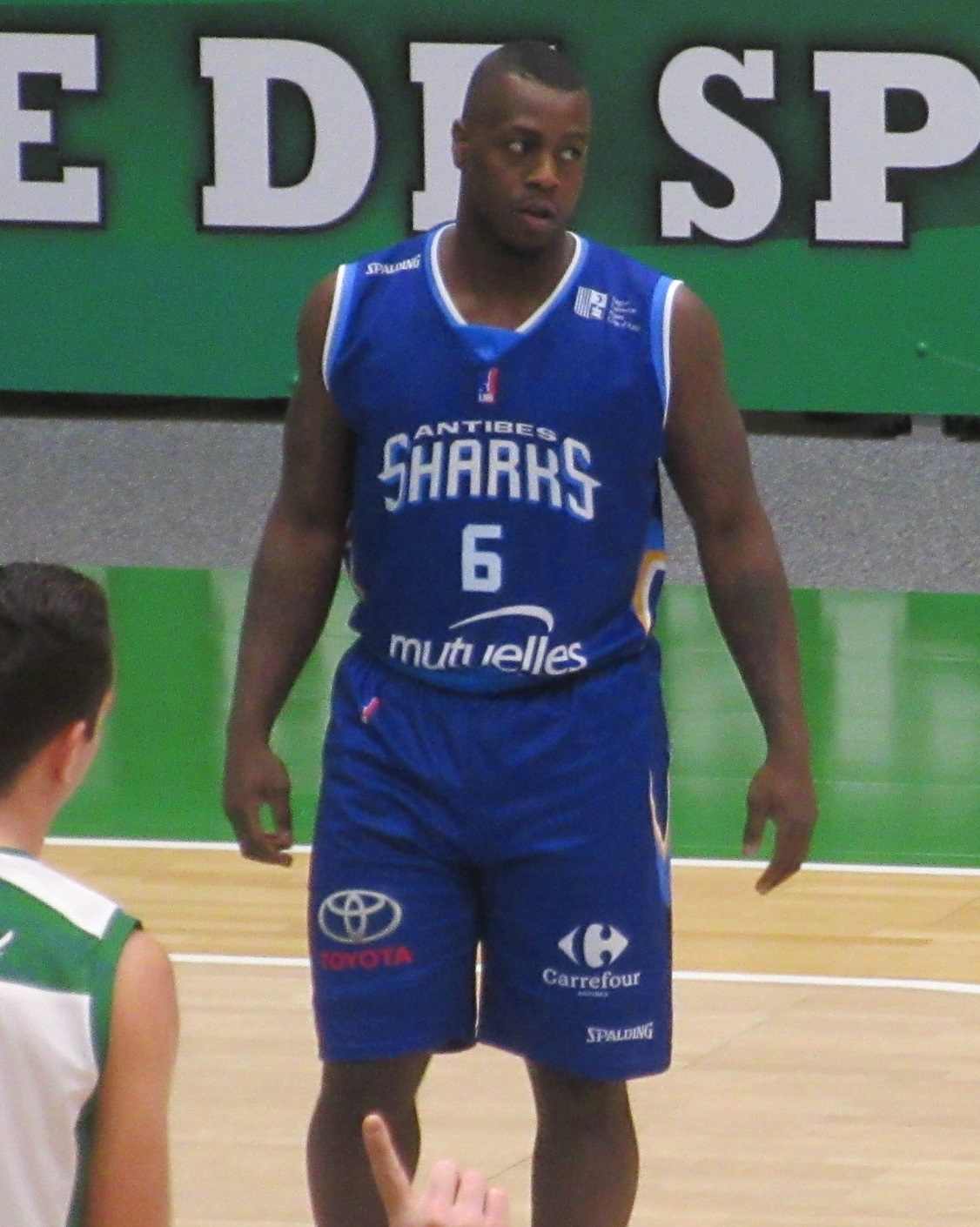
- Jones with Antibes Sharks in 2017

Personal information
- Born: July 3, 1991 (age 35) Memphis, Tennessee, U.S.
- Listed height: 5 ft 10 in (1.78 m)
- Listed weight: 175 lb (79 kg)

Career information
- High school: Melrose (Memphis, Tennessee)
- College: Northwest Florida State (2011–2013); Louisville (2013–2015)
- NBA draft: 2015: undrafted
- Playing career: 2015–present
- Position: Point guard

Career history
- 2015: BG Göttingen
- 2015–2016: Paris-Levallois
- 2016: Apollon Patras
- 2017: Antibes Sharks
- 2017–2018: Al Ahli SC
- 2018–2019: Windsor Express
- 2019: Gigantes de Jalisco
- 2019: Valur
- 2020: Windsor Express
- 2021–2022: London Lightning
- 2022: Indios de San Francisco
- 2023: London Lightning
- 2023–2024: Windsor Express
- 2024–2025: London Lightning
- 2025: Tauranga Whai

Career highlights
- BSL champion (2024); BSL Finals MVP (2024); LNB All-Star (2016); NABC Junior College Player of the Year (2013); 2× NJCAA All-American (2012, 2013)

Christopher Rasheed Jones (born July 3, 1991) is an American professional basketball player for the Santos del Potosí of the Liga Nacional de Baloncesto Profesional. After two years at Northwest Florida State and two years at Louisville, Jones entered the 2015 NBA draft but was not selected in the draft's two rounds.

== High school career ==
Jones played high school basketball at Melrose High School in Memphis, Tennessee where he was the Co-Star a long the side of Adonis Thomas Chris was a top 50 prospect as a senior at Melrose (Tenn.) High School, Jones originally signed with Tennessee in the same class as former Cardinal Kevin Ware before opting for the junior college route. He was rated as the nation's 10th-best point guard in high school by ESPN, Rivals and Scout, and the No. 39 prospect overall by Rivals. He also averaged 20.5 points, 6.8 rebounds and 6.1 assists per game as a junior in helping lead Melrose to a 26–7 overall record and the Tennessee Class AAA state title and a No. 15 finish in the ESPN Rise Fab 50 national rankings. He earned first-team all-state honors and was the state tournament MVP after scoring 35 points in the championship game. He scored 1,402 in three high school seasons. Transferred for his senior year to Oak Ridge (N.C.) Military Academy, where he averaged 22.5 points, 5.1 rebounds, 5.0 assists and 2.8 steals. Also considered Memphis, Kansas, Baylor, Florida State and Oklahoma State before his commitment to the Cardinals.

== College career ==
A 5'11" point guard, Jones was a junior college star at Northwest Florida State, where he was voted as the Division III NJCAA Player of the Year. After considering offers from major conference schools, he signed with Louisville and coach Rick Pitino.

He had been suspended from the Syracuse game on February 18 after having sent a threatening text message to a woman he had previously dated, after that woman went into his apartment when Jones was not present and "messed up" his room but was reinstated several days later. After playing against Miami on February 21, he missed that night's curfew, leading to his dismissal. He was dismissed from Louisville on February 22, 2015. Several days after that, Jones was charged with rape stemming from an incident that allegedly occurred the night of the Miami game. In late April, a grand jury chose not to indict Jones and his two co-defendants in the case. Chris Jones and the two co-defendants were exonerated of the all charges after the grand jury heard 2 days of testimony from the two co-defendants and witnesses. Also worthy of note the lead investigator for the University of Louisville Police Lt. John Tarter, was lead detective on 3 other rape cases in which 3 other defendants were convicted and then later exonerated. In one of those cases, the city paid a $3.9 million settlement to William Gregory, who was cleared by DNA evidence.

== Professional career ==
After initially signing with Yeşilgiresun Belediye in Turkey, Jones joined BG Goettingen in Germany for the start of the 2015–16 season. He appeared in one game for Goettingen before joining French team Paris-Levallois on October 20, 2015. In 30 games for Paris-Levallois, he averaged 12.0 points, 3.9 rebounds, 4.8 assists and 1.5 steals per game.

On August 23, 2016, Jones signed with Apollon Patras of the Greek Basket League. He left the team after six games. On March 16, 2017, he signed with French club Antibes Sharks as an injury replacement player. He parted ways with Antibes on April 10 after appearing in two games.

Jones played for Al Ahli SC in Qatar during the 2017–18 season.

Jones joined the Windsor Express of the National Basketball League of Canada for the 2018–19 season. In 28 games, he averaged 21.5 points, 5.4 rebounds, 4.4 assists and 1.6 steals per game. He then had a two-game stint in Mexico with Gigantes de Jalisco.

Jones joined Icelandic club Valur of the Úrvalsdeild karla for the 2019–20 season. In his debut, Jones scored 31 points in a victory against Fjölnir. On October 31, he refused to play the second half of Valur's game against Keflavík, effectively ending his stay with the club. Valur officially terminated its contract with Jones the following day. In five games for Valur, Jones averaged 19.0 points and 3.8 assists. In January 2020, Jones re-joined Windsor Express for the rest of the 2019–20 NBL Canada season.

For the 2021–22 season, Jones joined the London Lightning of the NBL Canada. In April 2022, he was suspended by the league and released by the team after throwing a water bottle on the court and spitting at an official.

He then had a four-game stint with Indios de San Francisco in the Dominican Republic.

In January 2023, Jones had a one-game stint with the London Lightning. Having been given a second chance by the Lightning, Jones was again suspended and released following a post-game altercation with the opposing coach.

For the 2023–24 season, Jones returned to the Windsor Express, now in the Basketball Super League (BSL). After 11 games for Windsor, he once again re-joined the London Lightning in February 2024. He helped London win the BSL championship. He was named the BSL Finals MVP.

Jones started the 2024–25 season with the London Lightning, but left the team in January 2025 after being suspended indefinitely by the BSL following a series of incidents.

In February 2025, Jones signed with the Tauranga Whai of the New Zealand National Basketball League (NZNBL) for the 2025 season. On May 12, 2025, he was released by the Whai following a breach of the team code of conduct.
