= Cedrick Wilson Sr. =

American football player (born 1978)

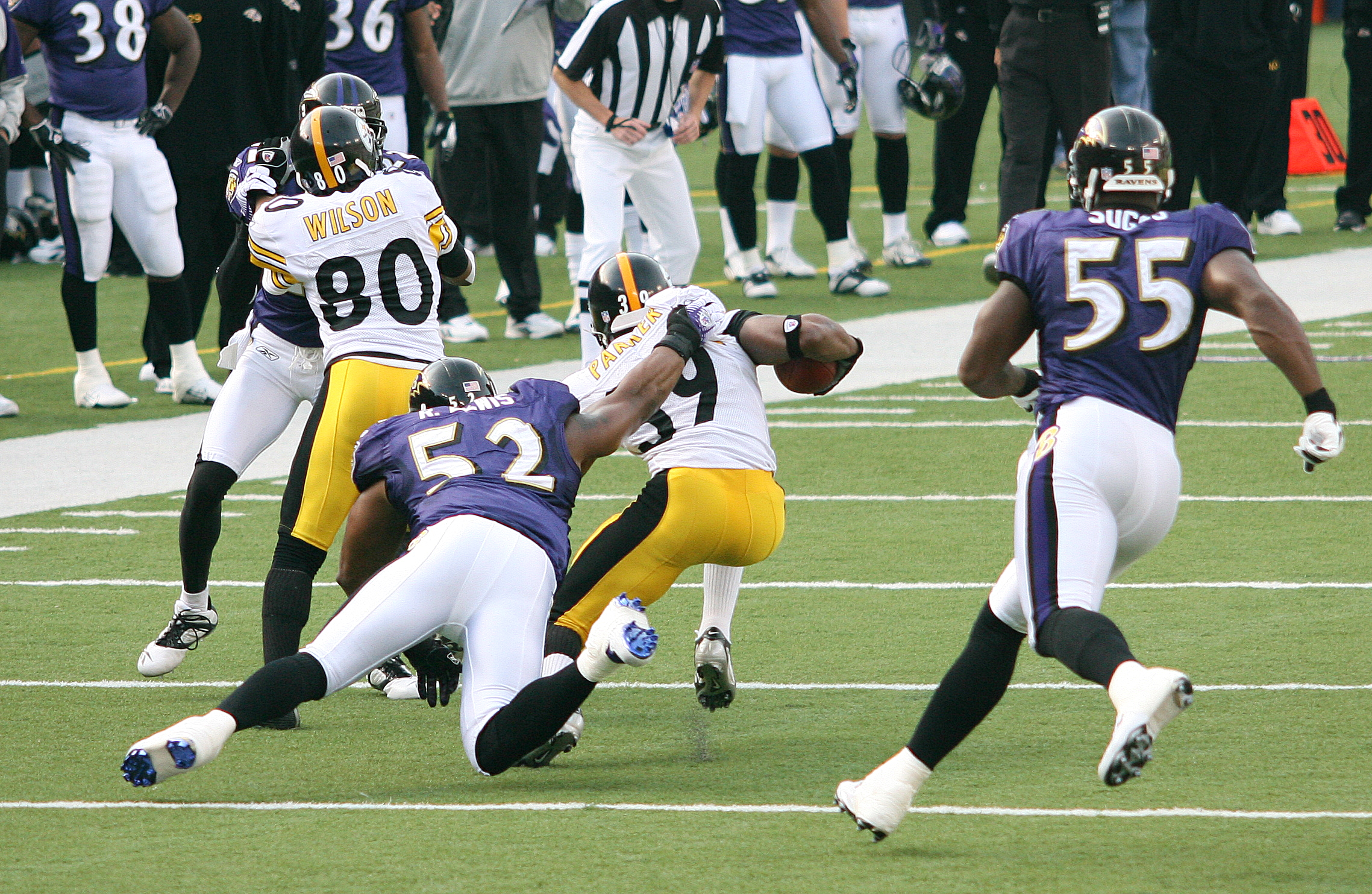
- Wilson (80) with the Pittsburgh Steelers in 2006

No. 84, 80
- Position: Wide receiver

Personal information
- Born: December 17, 1978 (age 47); Memphis, Tennessee, U.S.
- Listed height: 5 ft 10 in (1.78 m)
- Listed weight: 183 lb (83 kg)

Career information
- High school: Melrose (Memphis)
- College: Tennessee (1997–2000)
- NFL draft: 2001: 6th round, 169th overall pick

Career history
- San Francisco 49ers (2001–2004); Pittsburgh Steelers (2005–2007)

Awards and highlights
- Super Bowl champion (XL); BCS national champion (1998); 2× Second-team All-SEC (1999, 2000)

Career NFL statistics
- Receptions: 178
- Receiving yards: 2,365
- Receiving touchdowns: 8
- Return yards: 1,524
- Return touchdowns: 1
- Stats at Pro Football Reference

Cedrick Wilson Sr. (born December 17, 1978) is an American former professional football player who was a wide receiver in the National Football League (NFL). He played college football for the Tennessee Volunteers and was selected by the San Francisco 49ers in the sixth round of the 2001 NFL draft. He was picked up by the Pittsburgh Steelers in 2005. Wilson earned a Super Bowl ring with the Steelers in Super Bowl XL. With that achievement, he became one of very few football players to earn a championship ring at all three levels of football – high school, college, and professional. His son Cedrick Wilson Jr. has played in the NFL for the Dallas Cowboys, Miami Dolphins, and New Orleans Saints

== Early life ==
Wilson played high school football at Melrose High School, in Memphis, where he earned a state championship in 1996 as the starting quarterback topping off a 15–0 record. In high school, he was teammates with Kindal Moorehead, who made it to the NFL and played for the Carolina Panthers and the Atlanta Falcons. He was teammates with Andre Lott in high school and in college.

== College career ==
Wilson played college football at the University of Tennessee under head coach Phillip Fulmer. Wilson played with the Volunteers from 1997 to 2000. At the University of Tennessee, he converted to the wide receiver position from quarterback. He earned a national championship in the 1999 Fiesta Bowl defeating Florida State by a score of 23–16, topping off an undefeated season, 13–0.

== Professional career ==
Pre-draft measurables
Height	Weight	Arm length	Hand span	40-yard dash	10-yard split	20-yard split	Vertical jump	Broad jump
5 ft 9 3/4 in (1.77 m)	179 lb (81 kg)	29 in (0.74 m)	9 1/2 in (0.24 m)	4.48 s	1.56 s	2.62 s	38.0 in (0.97 m)	10 ft 3 in (3.12 m)
All values from NFL Combine

=== San Francisco 49ers ===
Wilson was selected in the sixth round with the 169th overall pick of the 2001 NFL draft by the San Francisco 49ers.

As a rookie, Wilson appeared in six games and only contributed on special teams, primarily as a kickoff returner.

In his second season in 2002, Wilson became a part of the receiving game for the 49ers. In Week 6, against the Seattle Seahawks, he had his first two receptions for 18 yards. He had his first professional touchdown in Week 9 against the Oakland Raiders. He finished with 15 receptions for 166 receiving yards and one touchdown.

In Week 9 of the 2003 season, Wilson had a 95-yard kickoff return for a touchdown to start the game against the St. Louis Rams in a 30–10 victory. He won NFC Special Teams Player of the Week for his game against the Rams. In the 2003 season, Wilson had 35 receptions for 396 receiving yards and two receiving touchdowns while contributing as a kickoff returner.

Wilson posted career highs in receptions (47), receiving yards (641), and receiving touchdowns (3) for the San Francisco 49ers in 2004.

=== Pittsburgh Steelers ===
On March 8, 2005, Wilson signed with the Pittsburgh Steelers and had considerably less success in the 2005 regular season.

Wilson's breakout for the Steelers came during the 2005 NFL playoffs. Having caught only 26 passes for 461 yards and two touchdowns during the regular season, Wilson became a reliable option for the Steelers on their path to Super Bowl XL. In the Wild Card Round against the Cincinnati Bengals, he had three receptions for 104 yards. In the AFC Championship against the Denver Broncos, he had five receptions for 92 yards. In Super Bowl XL against the Seattle Seahawks, Wilson had one reception for 20 yards on three targets.

In the 2006 season, Wilson appeared in 15 games and started 12. He finished with 37 receptions for 504 receiving yards and one receiving touchdown. In the 2007 season, Wilson finished with 18 receptions for 207 receiving yards and one receiving touchdown in 16 games and one start.

==== Assault incident ====
Wilson was charged with assaulting his ex-girlfriend at a Pittsburgh restaurant on March 19, 2008. According to the complaint, Wilson allegedly entered the restaurant and, upon seeing his ex-girlfriend, approached her, pushed her and punched her in the face. Wilson was to be arraigned on charges of simple assault, harassment, and disorderly conduct.

On March 20, 2008, the Steelers released Wilson just hours after the incident. The next day, Wilson's ex-girlfriend said Wilson only pushed her, not punched. She added, "It was misconstrued apparently by the people around us."

== NFL career statistics ==
Legend
**Bold**	Career high

=== Regular season ===
Year	Team	Games		Receiving					
Year	Team	GP	GS	Tgt	Rec	Yds	Avg	Lng	TD
2001	SFO	6	0	0	0	0	0.0	0	0
2002	SFO	**16**	0	22	15	166	11.1	22	1
2003	SFO	**16**	4	63	35	396	11.3	29	2
2004	SFO	15	**15**	**85**	**47**	**641**	13.6	39	**3**
2005	PIT	**16**	1	53	26	451	**17.3**	**46**	0
2006	PIT	15	12	69	37	504	13.6	38	1
2007	PIT	**16**	1	30	18	207	11.5	18	1
Career		100	33	322	178	2,365	13.3	46	8

=== Playoffs ===
Year	Team	Games		Receiving					
Year	Team	GP	GS	Tgt	Rec	Yds	Avg	Lng	TD
2002	SFO	2	0	2	2	40	20.0	22	0
2005	PIT	**4**	0	**12**	**9**	**216**	**24.0**	**54**	**2**
2007	PIT	1	0	1	1	10	10.0	10	0
Career		7	0	15	12	266	22.2	54	2

== Personal life ==
In 2008, Wilson began serving as offensive coordinator at Douglass High School in Memphis, Tennessee. Dee Montgomery, Wilson's former coach at Melrose High School, is also on the staff.

Wilson's son, Cedrick Wilson Jr., is currently a wide receiver for the New Orleans Saints of the National Football League.

Wilson later moved to White Station High School in Memphis as a volunteer coach, and became a substitute physical education teacher in the Memphis City Schools system. However, in October 2012, Wilson was indicted on federal charges of fraud for hiring two people to take his teacher certification exams in his place. This was part of a massive scam orchestrated by longtime Memphis educator Clarence Mumford in which dozens of teachers in Tennessee, Mississippi, and Arkansas paid Mumford as much as $3,000 to hire people to take teacher certification exams for them. Wilson was named the head football coach at Melrose, his old high school. Wilson was not retained as the head coach following the 2021 season.
