= 2000 All-SEC football team =

American college football all-star team

The 2000 All-SEC football team consists of American football players selected to the All-Southeastern Conference (SEC) chosen by various selectors for the 2000 NCAA Division I-A football season.

Auburn running back Rudi Johnson was unanimously voted the AP SEC Offensive Player of the Year. Tennessee defensive tackle John Henderson was unanimously voted the AP SEC Defensive Player of the Year.

== Offensive selections ==
=== Quarterbacks ===
- Ben Leard, Auburn (AP-1)
- Rex Grossman, Florida (AP-2)

=== Running backs ===
- Rudi Johnson*, Auburn (AP-1)
- Travis Henry*, Tennessee (AP-1)
- Derek Watson, South Carolina (AP-2)
- Dicenzo Miller, Miss. St. (AP-2)

=== Wide receivers ===
- Jabar Gaffney*, Florida (AP-1, Coaches-1)
- Josh Reed*, LSU (AP-1)
- Dan Stricker, Vanderbilt (AP-2)
- Cedrick Wilson Sr., Tennessee (AP-2)

=== Centers ===
- Louis Williams, LSU (AP-1)
- Michael Fair, Miss. St. (AP-2)

=== Guards ===
- Omar Smith, Kentucky (AP-1)
- Cedric Williams, South Carolina (AP-2)
- Jonas Jennings, Georgia (AP-2)

=== Tackles ===
- Floyd Womack, Mississippi State (AP-1)
- Kenyatta Walker, Florida (AP-1, Coaches-1)
- Mike Pearson, Florida (AP-2, Coaches-1)
- Terrence Metcalf, Ole Miss (AP-2)

=== Tight ends ===
- Derek Smith, Kentucky (AP-1)
- Robert Royal, LSU (AP-2)

== Defensive selections ==
=== Defensive ends ===
- Will Overstreet, Tennessee (AP-1)
- Derrick Burgess, Ole Miss (AP-1)
- Alex Brown, Florida (AP-2, Coaches-1)
- Conner Stephens, Miss. St. (AP-2)
- Willie Blade, Miss. St. (AP-2)

=== Defensive tackles ===
- John Henderson*, Tennessee (AP-1)
- Richard Seymour*, Georgia (AP-1)
- Marcus Stroud, Georgia (AP-2)
- Gerard Warren, Florida (AP-2, Coaches-2)

=== Linebackers ===
- Quinton Caver, Arkansas (AP-1)
- Kalimba Edwards, South Carolina (AP-1)
- Mario Haggan, Miss. St. (AP-1)
- Trev Faulk, LSU (AP-2)
- Eric Westmoreland, Tennessee (AP-2)
- Jamie Winborn, Vanderbilt (AP-2)
- Alex Lincoln, Auburn (AP-2)

=== Cornerbacks ===
- Lito Sheppard, Florida (AP-1, Coaches-1)
- Fred Smoot, Miss. St. (AP-1)
- Tim Wansley, Georgia (AP-2)
- Syniker Taylor, Ole Miss (AP-2)

=== Safeties ===
- Pig Prather, Miss. St. (AP-1)
- Todd Johnson, Florida (AP-1)
- Ken Lucas, Ole Miss (AP-2)
- Andre Lott, Tennessee (AP-2)

== Special teams ==
=== Kickers ===
- Alex Walls, Tennessee (AP-1)
- Jeff Chandler, Florida (AP-2, Coaches-2)
- Scott Westerfield, Miss. St. (AP-2)

=== Punters ===
- Damon Duval, Auburn (AP-1)
- Richie Butler, Arkansas (AP-2)

=== All purpose/return specialist ===
- Deuce McAllister, Ole Miss (AP-1)
- Derek Watson, South Carolina (AP-2)

== Key ==
AP = Associated Press.

Coaches = selected by the SEC coaches

* = unanimous selection of AP

== See also ==
- 2000 College Football All-America Team
