= Sam Walton (American football) =

American football player (1943–2002)

No. 92, 71
- Position: Offensive tackle

Personal information
- Born: January 3, 1943; Memphis, Tennessee, U.S.
- Died: May 9, 2002 (aged 59); Memphis, Tennessee, U.S.
- Listed height: 6 ft 5 in (1.96 m)
- Listed weight: 270 lb (122 kg)

Career information
- High school: Melrose (Memphis)
- College: East Texas State (1964–1967)
- NFL draft: 1968: 3rd round, 72nd overall pick

Career history
- New York Jets (1968–1969); New Orleans Saints (1970)*; Houston Oilers (1971); New York Stars (1974)*
- * Offseason or practice squad member only

Awards and highlights
- Super Bowl champion (III); AFL champion (1968)

Career NFL/AFL statistics
- Games played: 34
- Games started: 32
- Stats at Pro Football Reference

Samuel Thaw Walton (January 3, 1943 – May 9, 2002) was an American professional football tackle who played three seasons with the New York Jets and Houston Oilers. He was selected by the Jets in the third round of the 1968 NFL/AFL draft after playing college football at East Texas State University. He was a member of the Jets team that won Super Bowl III.

== Early life and college ==
Samuel Thaw Walton was born on January 3, 1943, in Memphis, Tennessee. He attended Melrose High School in Memphis.

Walton was a member of the East Texas State Lions of East Texas State University from 1964 to 1967 and a three-year letterman from 1965 to 1967.

== Professional career ==
Walton was selected by the New York Jets in the third round, with the 72nd overall pick, of the 1968 NFL draft. He started all 14 games for the Jets in 1968. He also played in both playoff games, including the Super Bowl III victory over the Baltimore Colts. Walton appeared in six games, starting five, during the 1969 season.

In May 1970, Walton was traded to the New Orleans Saints for a draft pick, which was dependent on Walton making the team. On September 18, 1970, before the start of the season, it was reported that Walton had been waived by the Saints.

Walton signed with the Houston Oilers in 1971. He played in all 14 games, starting 13, for the Oilers during the 1971 season. He was released in 1972.

Walton was drafted by the New York Stars of the World Football League in March 1974. He signed with the team but was released later that year.

== Personal life ==
After his football career ended, Walton became homeless on the streets of Memphis and died of a heart attack in 2002. His teammates had attempted to help him but were unsuccessful.
