= Matt Leonard =

American football player (born 1979)

No. 96
- Position: Defensive tackle

Personal information
- Born: November 7, 1979 (age 46); Agua Dulce, California, U.S.
- Listed height: 6 ft 3 in (1.91 m)
- Listed weight: 301 lb (137 kg)

Career information
- High school: Palmdale (Palmdale, California)
- College: Stanford
- NFL draft: 2003: undrafted

Career history
- Jacksonville Jaguars (2003–2004)

Career NFL statistics
- Total tackles: 2
- Games played: 4
- Games started: 0
- Stats at Pro Football Reference

Matt Leonard (born November 7, 1979) is an American former professional football player who was a defensive tackle for the Jacksonville Jaguars of the National Football League (NFL). He played college football for the Stanford Cardinal. Leonard played four games for the Jaguars in 2003, recording ten tackles.
