= John Henderson (defensive tackle) =

American football player (born 1979)

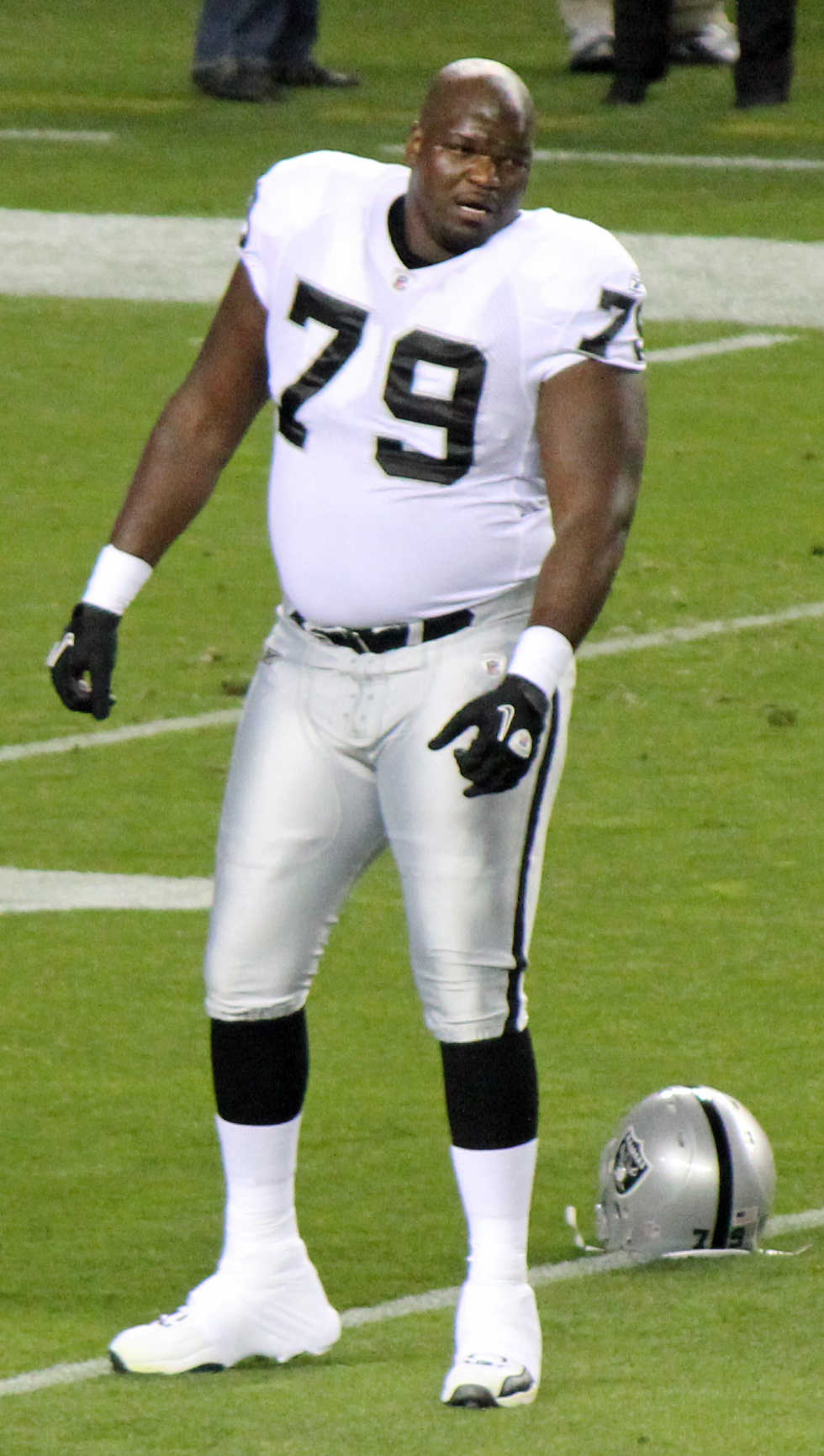
- Henderson with the Oakland Raiders in 2011

No. 98, 79
- Position: Defensive tackle

Personal information
- Born: January 9, 1979 (age 47); Nashville, Tennessee, U.S.
- Listed height: 6 ft 7 in (2.01 m)
- Listed weight: 335 lb (152 kg)

Career information
- High school: Pearl-Cohn Comprehensive (Nashville)
- College: Tennessee (1998–2001)
- NFL draft: 2002: 1st round, 9th overall pick

Career history
- Jacksonville Jaguars (2002–2009); Oakland Raiders (2010–2011)

Awards and highlights
- Second-team All-Pro (2006); 2× Pro Bowl (2004, 2006); PFWA All-Rookie Team (2002); BCS national champion (1998); Outland Trophy (2000); Unanimous All-American (2001); Consensus All-American (2000); 2× First-team All-SEC (2000, 2001)

Career NFL statistics
- Total tackles: 489
- Sacks: 29
- Forced fumbles: 8
- Fumble recoveries: 5
- Pass deflections: 45
- Stats at Pro Football Reference
- College Football Hall of Fame

John Nathan Henderson (born January 9, 1979), nicknamed "Big John" or "Big Hen", is an American former professional football player who was a defensive tackle for ten seasons in the National Football League (NFL). He played college football for the Tennessee Volunteers and was a two-time consensus All-American. The Jacksonville Jaguars chose him in the first round of the 2002 NFL draft, and he was selected for the Pro Bowl twice. He also played for the Oakland Raiders. Henderson was inducted into the College Football Hall of Fame in 2025.

== Early life ==
Henderson was born in Nashville, Tennessee. He attended Pearl-Cohn Comprehensive High School in Nashville, where he played defensive tackle and tight end for the Pearl Cohn Firebirds high school football team. His teams won back-to-back state championships during his junior and senior years. He was named All-State as a junior when he had 145 tackles and 15 sacks, along with 37 catches for 470 yards and 9 touchdowns. As a senior, he finished with 150 tackles and 32 sacks, to go with 45 catches for 560 yards and 11 touchdowns. He was also selected as a High School All-American by Parade magazine, USA Today, Blue Chip Illustrated, National Recruiting Advisor, and Super Prep. He was ranked as the 7th best high school player in The Sporting News Top 100 and was ranked 1st in the state of Tennessee by the Knoxville News Sentinel and the Chattanooga Times Free Press. Henderson also was named All-State in basketball.

== College career ==
While attending the University of Tennessee in Knoxville, Henderson played for coach Phillip Fulmer's Tennessee Volunteers football team from 1998 to 2001. At Tennessee, he lined up at left defensive tackle next to Albert Haynesworth. He played in the 1999 Fiesta Bowl, 2000 Cotton Bowl Classic, and 2001 Citrus Bowl. As a sophomore, Henderson recorded 43 tackles and four sacks in seven starts. As a junior, Henderson recorded 71 tackles (21 for a loss) and 12 sacks. He won the Outland Trophy as college football's top interior lineman and was recognized as a consensus first-team All-American in 2000, having received first-team honors from the Associated Press, Football Writers Association of America, The Sporting News, Football News, CNN/SI, and Rivals.com. After finishing with 48 tackles (nine for a loss) and 4.5 sacks in 10 starts, Henderson was again recognized as a consensus first-team All-American as a senior in 2001. He finished his college career with 165 tackles (130 solo and 39 for loss) and 20.5 sacks (5th in school history), seven pass deflections, four forced fumbles, and five fumble recoveries.

== Professional career ==
Pre-draft measurables
Height	Weight	Arm length	Hand span	40-yard dash	20-yard shuttle	Three-cone drill	Vertical jump	Broad jump	Bench press
6 ft 6 7/8 in (2.00 m)	308 lb (140 kg)	34 1/2 in (0.88 m)	8 3/4 in (0.22 m)	4.87 s	4.66 s	7.71 s	27.5 in (0.70 m)	9 ft 2 in (2.79 m)	24 reps
All values from NFL Combine

=== Jacksonville Jaguars ===
Henderson was the Jacksonville Jaguars' first-round pick (9th overall) in the 2002 NFL draft. He finished his rookie season with 53 tackles (44 solo), 6.5 sacks, 6 pass deflections, and 1 forced fumble in 16 games (13 starts). He was named to the PFWA All-Rookie Team. In 2003, he had 56 tackles (45 solo and 13 for loss), 3.5 sacks, 7 pass deflections, 3 forced fumbles, and 33 quarterback pressures in 16 starts. In 2004, he finished with 75 tackles (62 solo and 5 for loss), 5.5 sacks, 4 pass deflections, 1 fumble recovery, and 39 quarterback pressures in 16 starts and was selected to his first Pro Bowl. In 2005, Henderson had 70 tackles (52 solo and 4 for loss), 3 sacks, 7 pass deflections, 3 forced fumbles, and 20 quarterback pressures in 16 games (15 starts). He also started in the Jaguars' lone playoff game and recorded 5 tackles and 1 sack. On March 21, 2006, Henderson signed a new 6 year, $34 million contract extension with the Jaguars through 2011. The contract also contains $13.4 million guaranteed. Henderson responded with 51 tackles (38 solo and 6 for loss), 3.5 sacks, 6 pass deflections, and 7 quarterback pressures, as well as his second Pro Bowl selection. He was also named an AP Second Team All-Pro. He was filmed by the NFL Network getting pumped up for a game by having a team trainer slap him in the face. In 2007, Henderson finished with 38 tackles (28 solo), 2 sacks, 3 pass deflections, 1 forced fumble, and 13 quarterback pressures in 15 starts, marking the first time in his career he did not play all 16 games. Henderson started both playoff games for the Jaguars, finishing with 9 tackles and 2 sacks. In March 2008, Henderson's good friend and fellow defensive tackle Marcus Stroud was traded to the Buffalo Bills. Henderson finished the 2008 season with 44 tackles (34 solo), 2 sacks, and 2 pass deflections in 14 games. In the 2009 off-season, Jaguars head coach Jack Del Rio was critical of Henderson for pulling out of OTAs, claiming he was faking a shoulder injury to avoid having to participate. Although many believed Henderson would be released, he met privately with Del Rio and claimed that he had "bought in". Henderson finished the 2009 season with 36 tackles (26 solo), 3 sacks, 3 pass deflections, and 2 forced fumbles.

Henderson was released by the Jaguars on April 26, 2010.

=== Oakland Raiders ===
On June 11, 2010, Henderson signed a one-year contract with the Oakland Raiders. He played in nine games and two starts. He recorded 30 total tackles and three passes defended. On February 24, 2011, he signed a two-year, $8 million contract with the Raiders. He finished the 2011 season with 36 total tackles and four passes defended in 13 games and three starts. Following the 2011 season, he was released on March 14, 2012.

=== NFL statistics ===
Year	Team	GP	Comb	Total	Ast	Sck	FF	FR	Yds	TD	Int	Yds	Lng	TD	PD
2002	JAX	16	53	44	9	6.5	1	2	0	0	0	0	0	0	6
2003	JAX	16	56	45	11	3.5	3	1	0	0	0	0	0	0	7
2004	JAX	16	75	62	13	5.5	0	1	0	0	0	0	0	0	4
2005	JAX	16	70	52	18	3.0	1	0	0	0	0	0	0	0	7
2006	JAX	16	51	38	13	3.5	0	0	0	0	0	0	0	0	6
2007	JAX	15	38	28	10	2.0	1	0	0	0	0	0	0	0	3
2008	JAX	14	44	34	10	2.0	0	0	0	0	0	0	0	0	2
2009	JAX	15	36	26	10	3.0	2	1	0	0	0	0	0	0	3
2010	OAK	9	30	24	6	0.0	0	0	0	0	0	0	0	0	3
2011	OAK	13	36	25	11	0.0	0	0	0	0	0	0	0	0	4
Career		146	489	378	111	29.0	8	5	0	0	0	0	0	0	45

== Personal life ==
Henderson met his wife Aleviar while attending the University of Tennessee in 2001. They were married on March 10, 2007. Together they have six children: Ja’ Mari, Anaiya, Talia, Ayden, Asa, and Ari Henderson. Their daughter Talia was born with cerebral palsy and epilepsy, and died at age 7 in 2011. In Talia's honor, the Hendersons have made a commitment to help improve the quality of life of other children with disabilities through their nonprofit organization Luvthekidz.

The Hendersons have owned and operated several businesses in the US. In 2007, Henderson opened a clothing store in Jacksonville called "4 Big Men by Big Hen" that sold big and tall clothing. In 2011 the Hendersons opened Aleviar's VIP Lounge and Jazz Bar in Jacksonville, as well as Coast2Coast Trucking in Los Angeles. In 2012, Henderson opened multiple restaurant locations in Jacksonville called "Big John's Crumpy's Wings & Things"; the restaurant closed in 2015.
