= Brooks County High School =

American School in Quitman, Brooks County, Georgia

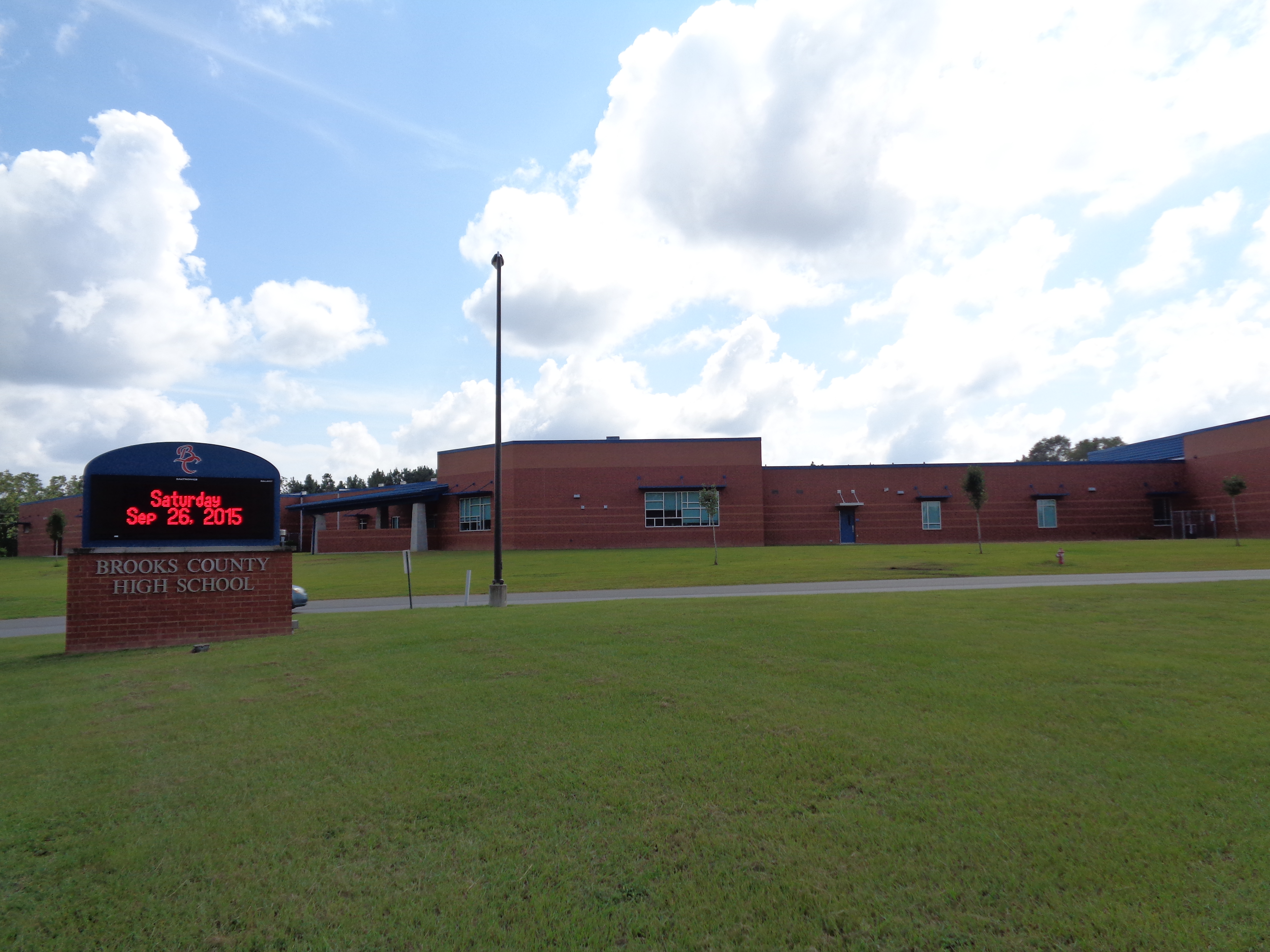

Location
- 1801 Moultrie Rd; Quitman, Brooks County, Georgia 31643; United States
- Coordinates: 30°48′36″N 83°33′47″W

Information
- Established: 1959; 67 years ago
- Principal: Chris Chastain
- Teaching staff: 39.00 (FTE)
- Grades: 9th–12th
- Gender: Coeducational
- Enrollment: 550 (2023-2024)
- Student to teacher ratio: 14.10
- Colors: Red, white and blue
- Slogan: Bring The Hammer, Leave with a Tassel
- Nickname: Trojans

Brooks County High School is a high school serving Quitman, Georgia, United States. It has won several Georgia Interscholastic Association state football championships. It also has a very famous football team and tradition, as well as the head coach Maruice Freeman, being one of the most successful coaches in Georgia Football State History.

The school offers community service clubs, technology and career clubs, and honors and special interest clubs. Sports include football, basketball, volleyball, softball, cheerleading, tennis, baseball, golf, wrestling, soccer, and track.

The school is located at 1801 Moultrie Highway.

== Notable alumni ==
- Kendra Norman-Bellamy, Christian author
- Marcus Stroud, football player
- Lawrence Virgil, football player
