= Marcus Stroud =

American football player (born 1978)

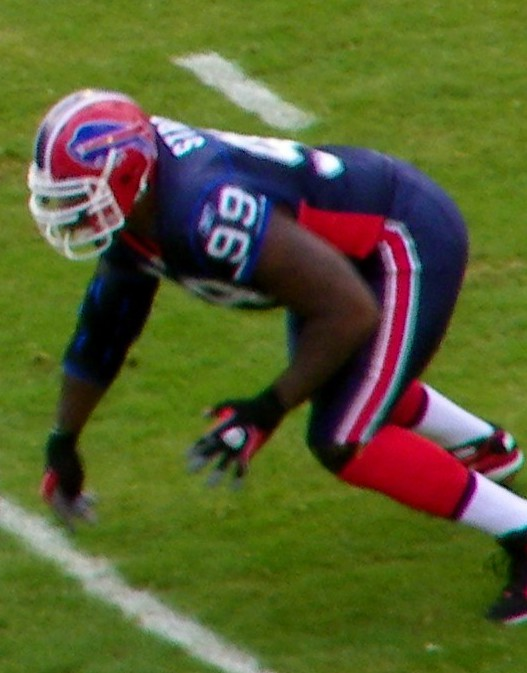
- Stroud with the Buffalo Bills in 2010

No. 99
- Position: Defensive tackle

Personal information
- Born: June 25, 1978 (age 48); Thomasville, Georgia, U.S.
- Listed height: 6 ft 6 in (1.98 m)
- Listed weight: 310 lb (141 kg)

Career information
- High school: Brooks County (Quitman, Georgia)
- College: Georgia (1996–2000)
- NFL draft: 2001: 1st round, 13th overall pick

Career history
- Jacksonville Jaguars (2001–2007); Buffalo Bills (2008–2010); New England Patriots (2011)*
- * Offseason or practice squad member only

Awards and highlights
- Second-team All-Pro (2003); 3× Pro Bowl (2003–2005); Second-team All-SEC (2000)

Career NFL statistics
- Total tackles: 424
- Sacks: 29.5
- Forced fumbles: 8
- Fumble recoveries: 6
- Pass deflections: 39
- Stats at Pro Football Reference

Marcus LaVar Stroud (born June 25, 1978) is an American former professional football player who was a defensive tackle for 10 seasons in the National Football League (NFL). He played college football for the Georgia Bulldogs, and was selected by the Jacksonville Jaguars with the 13th overall pick in the 2001 NFL draft. He was a member of the NFL's Buffalo Bills and New England Patriots.

== Early life ==
Stroud won a state title with Brooks County High School in 1994. He appeared on the cover of Sports Illustrated in 1996 while still in high school which featured a cover story of National Signing Day. Stroud, at the time a 6'6" 266-pound defensive end, originally gave Florida a verbal commitment but changed his mind after Bulldogs coach Ray Goff was fired in November 1995. After heavy pursuit from new Georgia coach Jim Donnan, Stroud switched and committed to the Bulldogs on Signing Day.

== College career ==
Stroud attended the University of Georgia, where he played for the Georgia Bulldogs football team. He played for Georgia during a major re-building era, in which coach Jim Donnan turned the program around from among the mediocre to averaging 8 wins per year, including four straight bowl game victories.

He was initiated as a member of Phi Beta Sigma fraternity while he was an undergraduate.

== Professional career ==
Pre-draft measurables
Height	Weight	Arm length	Hand span	40-yard dash	10-yard split	20-yard split	20-yard shuttle	Three-cone drill	Vertical jump	Broad jump	Bench press
6 ft 6 1/8 in (1.98 m)	321 lb (146 kg)	34 1/2 in (0.88 m)	10 in (0.25 m)	5.10 s	1.76 s	2.96 s	4.72 s	8.07 s	30.0 in (0.76 m)	9 ft 2 in (2.79 m)	21 reps
All values from NFL Combine

=== Jacksonville Jaguars ===
Stroud was selected in the first round with the 13th overall pick in the 2001 NFL draft by the Jaguars. The 2001 NFL Draft is considered by many experts to be the finest draft for defensive tackles in draft history, and Stroud was among the highest rated of the group that year. The 2001 class included fellow Pro Bowl selections Richard Seymour, Casey Hampton and Kris Jenkins.

He and John Henderson helped give the Jaguars one of the more dominant defensive tackles duos in the NFL.

During his Jacksonville days, Stroud had 22 sacks and 256 tackles while appearing in 100 games. Stroud also played in every Jaguars game for the first 5 years of his career.

Marcus Stroud was selected to the Pro Bowl following the 2003, 2004 and 2005 NFL seasons.

Stroud was suspended in 2007 for four games without pay for violating the league's policy on anabolic steroids and related substances.

=== Buffalo Bills ===
On March 1, 2008, Stroud was traded to the Buffalo Bills for third (previously acquired from the Baltimore Ravens in the Willis McGahee trade)- and fifth-round picks in the 2008 NFL draft.

Stroud was immediately deemed one of the key players to the Bills' 2008 season. Buffalo ranked 31st in total defense the year prior, and vaulted up to 14th in 2008, Stroud's first season there. The Bills got off to a strong start that year, going 5–1 in the first six games. They fell off towards the mid-season mark, however, and finished the year with a 7–9 record.

On April 7, 2009, Stroud signed a two-year contract extension that paid $16 million and guaranteed $12 million. In combination with the existing terms of his contract, Stroud could've earned an additional $28 million over the following four seasons. Stroud was released on February 16, 2011.

=== New England Patriots ===
On March 1, 2011, the New England Patriots signed defensive lineman Stroud to a two-year contract. He was released just under 5 months later on July 28.

=== Retirement ===
In June 2012, Stroud signed a one-day contract with the Jaguars and announced his retirement. He became the fifth player to re-sign with Jacksonville before retiring, joining Tony Boselli, Fred Taylor, Paul Spicer and Donovin Darius.

=== NFL statistics ===
Year	Team	GP	Tackles				Fumbles		Interceptions					
Year	Team	GP	Comb	Solo	Ast	Sack	FF	FR	Int	Yds	Avg	Lng	TD	PD
2001	JAX	16	25	21	4	0.0	0	0	0	0	0.0	0	0	3
2002	JAX	16	45	38	7	6.5	3	1	0	0	0.0	0	0	6
2003	JAX	16	65	47	18	4.5	0	0	0	0	0.0	0	0	3
2004	JAX	16	54	38	16	4.5	2	1	0	0	0.0	0	0	3
2005	JAX	16	42	31	11	1.0	1	0	0	0	0.0	0	0	4
2006	JAX	11	21	19	2	2.5	0	0	0	0	0.0	0	0	1
2007	JAX	9	22	19	3	3.0	0	1	0	0	0.0	0	0	2
2008	BUF	16	45	29	16	2.5	1	2	0	0	0.0	0	0	7
2009	BUF	15	56	38	18	2.0	0	1	0	0	0.0	0	0	8
2010	BUF	15	49	29	20	3.0	1	0	0	0	0.0	0	0	2
Career		146	424	309	115	29.5	8	6	0	0	0.0	0	0	39

== Community ==
During his NFL days, Stroud founded the Marcus Stroud Charitable Foundation to assist underprivileged youth who lived in low-income, single-parent homes, according to its website, by establishing various academic and athletic programs otherwise unavailable to them. Additionally, Stroud hosts an annual football camp aimed to combat childhood obesity.

Stroud hosted the Marcus Stroud 99 Pro Bowl Football Camp For Kids in May 2009 at Brooks County's Veterans Stadium in Georgia. Several NFL players, including Mike Peterson and Verron Haynes of the Atlanta Falcons, and George Wilson, Donte Whitner, Kavika Mitchell, Marcus Buggs and Drayton Florence of the Buffalo Bills contributed to the free camp.

== Personal ==
Stroud has a passion for classic cars and eventually founded his own auto body business, DeciBels Auto Creations, in Jacksonville.

Stroud escaped injury in 2005, when he rolled his SUV while driving on Florida's Interstate 10 outside of Jacksonville.
