= Derek Watson (gridiron football) =

American gridiron football player (born 1981)

No. 43
- Position: Running back

Personal information
- Born: May 1, 1981 (age 45); Anderson, South Carolina, U.S.
- Listed height: 6 ft 0 in (1.83 m)
- Listed weight: 223 lb (101 kg)

Career information
- High school: Palmetto
- College: South Carolina State
- NFL draft: 2003: undrafted

Career history
- 2003: New England Patriots*
- 2005: Tampa Bay Buccaneers
- 2009: Calgary Stampeders
- * Offseason or practice squad member only

Awards and highlights
- Second-team All-SEC (2000)
- Stats at CFL.ca

Derek Watson (born May 1, 1981) is an American former professional football running back for the Calgary Stampeders of the Canadian Football League (CFL). He was signed by the New England Patriots as an undrafted free agent in 2003. He played college football for the South Carolina State Bulldogs and the South Carolina Gamecocks. He attended high school at Palmetto High School in Williamston, South Carolina.

Watson was also a member of the Tampa Bay Buccaneers of the National Football League (NFL).
