= Palmetto High School (South Carolina) =

Location
- 804 N. Hamilton Street; Williamston, South Carolina 29697; United States
- Coordinates: 34°37′54″N 82°28′37″W

Information
- Type: Public
- School district: Anderson School District One
- Superintendent: Seth Young
- CEEB code: 412118
- Principal: Robert A. Roach
- Teaching staff: 57.00 (FTE)
- Grades: 9–12
- Gender: Co-educational
- Enrollment: 1,086 (2023-2024)
- Student to teacher ratio: 19.05
- Colors: Red and grey
- Athletics conference: AAA Region 2
- Nickname: Mustang
- Website: www.anderson1.org/o/plh

Palmetto High School is a high school in Williamston, South Carolina, United States. It serves an average of about 1000 students.

== Academy ==
Ninth graders are placed in the Freshman Academy, separating them from the rest of the student body for their core classes. The Academy's courses include English II Honors, Biology Honors, AP Human Geography, and Geometry Honors.

== Athletics ==
Palmetto's athletic teams are known as the Mustangs.

=== State championships ===
- Baseball: 1985, 1987
- Competitive Cheer: 2005, 2016, 2017, 2018, 2023
- Cross Country - Boys: 2000
- Cross Country - Girls: 2016
- Football: 1970
- Golf - Boys: 1990, 1992
- Softball: 2012

== Notable alumni ==
- Derek Watson, former National Football League running back
