= Omar Smith =

Jamaican gridiron football player (born 1977)

No. 68
- Position: Center

Personal information
- Born: September 8, 1977 (age 49); Spanish Town, Jamaica
- Listed height: 6 ft 2 in (1.88 m)
- Listed weight: 295 lb (134 kg)

Career information
- High school: Nova
- College: Kentucky
- NFL draft: 2001: undrafted

Career history
- St. Louis Rams (2001)*; Oakland Raiders (2001)*; New York Giants (2002–2004); Tampa Bay Storm (2005)
- * Offseason or practice squad member only

Awards and highlights
- First-team All-SEC (2000)

Career NFL statistics
- Games played: 11
- Games started: 0
- Stats at Pro Football Reference

Omar Dave Smith (born September 8, 1977) is a former American football center who played in the National Football League (NFL) for three seasons. He played college football at Kentucky.

== Professional career ==
=== St. Louis Rams ===
After going undrafted in the 2001 NFL draft, Smith signed with the St. Louis Rams as a free agent. Smith was released before the start of the season.

=== Oakland Raiders ===
Smith spent one week on the Oakland Raiders practice squad during the 2001 season.

=== New York Giants ===
After the 2001 season, Smith was signed by the New York Giants. He saw action in 11 games over two seasons. Smith failed to make the team out of training camp in 2004, and was released.

=== Tampa Bay Storm ===
On November 9, 2004, Smith was signed by the Tampa Bay Storm of the Arena Football League. In the 2005 season, he played in 16 games for the Storm, making three tackles.
