= Lawrence Virgil =

American football player (born 1991)

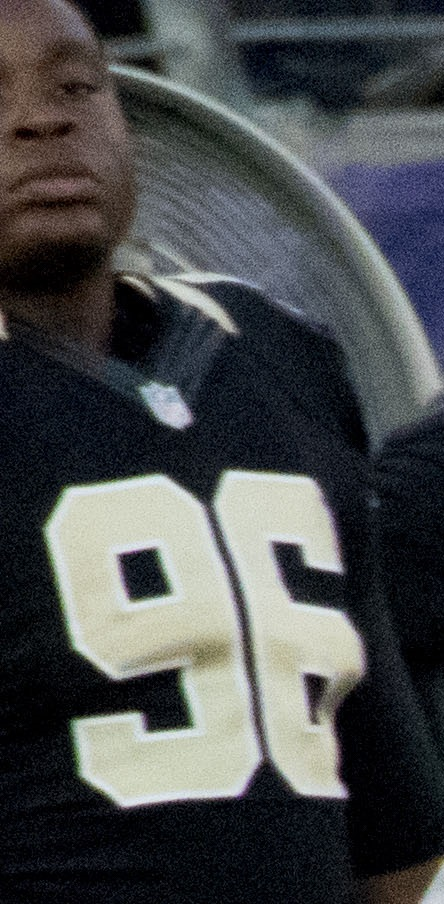
- Virgil with the New Orleans Saints in 2015

No. 62, 96
- Position: Defensive tackle

Personal information
- Born: January 20, 1991 (age 35); Quitman, Georgia, U.S.
- Listed height: 6 ft 5 in (1.96 m)
- Listed weight: 290 lb (132 kg)

Career information
- High school: Brooks County (Quitman)
- College: Valdosta State
- NFL draft: 2014: undrafted

Career history
- New Orleans Saints (2014–2015)

Awards and highlights
- NCAA Division II national champion (2012)

Career NFL statistics
- Total tackles: 2
- Stats at Pro Football Reference

Lawrence Virgil (born January 20, 1991) is an American former professional football player who was a defensive tackle for the New Orleans Saints of the National Football League (NFL). He played college football for the Valdosta State Blazers. Virgil’s NFL career ended due to the tearing of his ACL, MCL, and meniscus in his left knee.

== Early life ==
Virgil played high school football at Brooks County High School in Quitman, Georgia. He helped the Trojans to a 9-3 record and the round of 16 of the Georgia AA state tournament.

During his college career, Virgil played for the Valdosta State Blazers from 2010 to 2013.

== Professional career ==
Virgil signed with the New Orleans Saints of the NFL on May 12, 2014 after going undrafted in the 2014 NFL draft. He was released by the Saints on August 30 and signed to the team's practice squad on September 2, 2014. He was promoted to the active roster on November 27, 2014.

Virgil made his NFL debut on December 28, 2014 against the Tampa Bay Buccaneers. He was waived-injured by the Saints on August 17, 2015. He reverted to injured reserve on August 18.

He was taken off injured reserve on February 8, 2016 and became a free agent on March 9. Virgil signed with the Saints on June 18, 2016. He was released by the Saints on August 3, 2016, due to his knee injury.
