= Melrose High School (Memphis, Tennessee) =

Location
- 2870 Deadrick; Memphis, Tennessee 38114; United States; 35.10542°N 89.96684°W

Information
- School type: public, secondary
- School district: Memphis-Shelby County Schools
- Principal: Mark Neal
- Staff: 39.67 (FTE)
- Grades: 9–12
- Gender: coed
- Enrollment: 710 (2023–2024)
- Student to teacher ratio: 17.90
- Colors: Maroon and old gold
- Team name: Golden Wildcats
- Website: Official website

Melrose High School is a public high school located in Memphis, Tennessee, in the Orange Mound area, serving 710 students in grades 9–12. It is served by Memphis-Shelby County Schools.

== Athletics ==
The 2009–10 boys basketball team won the school's fourth state championship Melrose's football teams were 1996 & 1998 state champions. In 2004 & 2005 the football program made back to back State Championships runs.

=== Championships by sport ===
- Girls' Track - 2 (1983, 1984)
- Girls' Basketball - 1 (1985)
- Boys' Track - 2 (1965, 2003)
- Boys' Basketball - 4 (1974, 1978, 1983, 2010)
- Football - 1 (1985)

== Notable alumni ==
- William Bedford, basketball player
- Graig Cooper, NFL running back
- Richard Cooper, NFL offensive tackle
- Larry Finch, basketball player
- Jacob Ford, NFL defensive end
- GloRilla, rapper
- Chris Jones, basketball player
- Ezell Jones, NFL offensive tackle
- Jemerrio Jones, NBA G Player, Wisconsin Herd
- Andre Lott, NFL safety
- Tony Madlock, college basketball coach
- Larry Mallory, NFL safety
- Kindal Moorehead, NFL defensive tackle, strength coach at University of Alabama
- Pat Neely, CEO of famous Neely's Bar-B-Que and Neely's Interstate Bar-B-Que
- Bobby Ray Parks Jr., basketball player
- Tony Pollard, NFL running back, 2022 Pro Bowl selection
- Larry Riley, Broadway, movie, and television actor
- Dewayne Robertson, NFL defensive tackle
- Ronnie Robinson, basketball player
- Bingo Smith, NBA player
- Rochelle Stevens, athlete, Olympic and world champion
- Adonis Thomas, basketball player, Israel Basketball Premier League
- Sam Walton, NFL offensive tackle and Super Bowl III champion
- Barry Wilburn, NFL defensive back and Super Bowl XXII champion
- Ralph Wiley, journalist
- Cedrick Wilson, NFL wide receiver and Super Bowl XL champion
- Jerome Woods, NFL Pro Bowl safety
