= Trev Faulk =

American football player and coach (born 1981)

No. 51, 54, 57
- Position: Linebacker

Personal information
- Born: August 6, 1981 (age 45); Lafayette, Louisiana, U.S.
- Listed height: 6 ft 3 in (1.91 m)
- Listed weight: 254 lb (115 kg)

Career information
- High school: Lafayette
- College: LSU
- NFL draft: 2002: undrafted

Career history

Playing
- Denver Broncos (2002)*; Dallas Cowboys (2002)*; Arizona Cardinals (2002–2003); St. Louis Rams (2003–2005); New Orleans Saints (2007)
- * Offseason or practice squad member only

Coaching
- Northside High Volunteer assistant; Vermilion Catholic (2011) Head coach; Northside High (2012–2015) Head coach; Lafayette Christian Academy (2016–2022) Head coach; Lafayette Renaissance Charter High (2024–present) Director of Football Operations

Awards and highlights
- Second-team All-American (2001); First-team All-SEC (2001); Second-team All-SEC (2000); 2× National "L" Club Award (2000, 2001); 2× George M. Wallace Memorial Award (2000, 2001); Second-team Freshman All-American (1999); Freshman All-SEC (1999)

Career NFL statistics
- Games played: 29
- Games started: 7
- Total tackles: 82
- Forced fumbles: 1
- Stats at Pro Football Reference

Treverance Donta Faulk (born August 6, 1981) is an American former professional football player who was a linebacker in the National Football League (NFL). He played college football for the LSU Tigers.

== College career ==
Faulk attended Louisiana State University (LSU) and was a star linebacker for the Tigers.

=== College statistics ===
Season	GP	Tackles					Sacks		Interceptions					Fumbles		
Season	GP	Solo	Ast	Cmb	TfL	Yds	Sck	Yds	Int	Yds	BU	PD	QBH	FR	Yds	FF
1999	11	40	28	68	4.0	8	–	–	–	–	3	3	5	1	0	–
2000	12	77	36	113	9.0	24	2	3	–	–	2	2	–	3	0	–
2001	12	77	42	119	3.5	17	2	11	–	–	2	2	14	–	–	1
Career	35	194	106	300	16.5	49	4	14	–	–	7	7	19	4	0	1

== Professional career ==
Pre-draft measurables
Height	Weight	40-yard dash	Vertical jump	Broad jump
6 ft 3 in (1.91 m)	241 lb (109 kg)	4.90 s	32 in (0.81 m)	9 ft 8 in (2.95 m)
All values from NFL Combine

=== Denver Broncos ===
Faulk signed with the Denver Broncos as an undrafted rookie free agent on April 29, 2002. He appeared in the team's Week 1 preseason game against the Chicago Bears on August 10, recording three tackles and sacking quarterback Henry Burris for a loss of nine yards. The Broncos went on to win the game 27–3. Faulk made another appearance in Week 2 and was on the roster in Week 3 but did not play. He did not survive Denver's preseason cuts and the Broncos waived him on August 26, making him a free agent.

=== Dallas Cowboys ===
Faulk joined the Dallas Cowboys' practice squad on September 26, 2002. Faulk was waived by the Cowboys on November 15.

=== Arizona Cardinals ===
Faulk signed with the Arizona Cardinals on December 11, 2002. He was on the inactive list from Weeks 15 to 17 of the 2002 season but did not see any playing time.

During the 2003 preseason, Faulk appeared in Arizona's Week 2 game against the San Diego Chargers on August 16, 2003, and made two tackles. He was waived by the Cardinals on August 25.

=== St. Louis Rams ===
Faulk was acquired by the St. Louis Rams on December 31, 2003. He survived preseason cuts and made the 2004 regular season team for the first time in his career. Faulk tore his hamstring in Week 1 against the Arizona Cardinals and was sidelined for the next two games. Faulk returned in Week 4 against the San Francisco 49ers, making four tackles. In the 2004 postseason, he made a total of three tackles, including one in a 27–20 win over the Seattle Seahawks. Faulk led the team in special teams tackles during the 2004 season with 24 and was named Outstanding Special Teams player.

During a 2005 preseason match with the Chicago Bears, Faulk brought down quarterback Rex Grossman who broke his ankle, sidelining him for the majority of the season. He signed a one-year contract extension with the Rams before the regular season finale in 2005. During the 2004 and 2005 seasons, Faulk played a total of 29 regular season games and appeared in two postseason games. During the 2006 offseason, he underwent back surgery and missed the team's mini-camp in April. He was waived by the Rams on September 3, 2006.

=== New Orleans Saints ===
After missing the 2006 season due to injury, Faulk joined the New Orleans Saints on April 16, 2007. He appeared in the Hall of Fame game against the Pittsburgh Steelers during the 2007 preseason. Faulk had two penalties on special teams as the Saints lost the game 7-20. He was released by New Orleans on August 8, and retired the same year.

== Coaching career ==
Faulk was working as a volunteer assistant at Northside High School when he decided to try his hand at coaching.

In February 2011, Faulk was announced as the new head coach of Vermilion Catholic High School football team. Under his leadership, the Screaming Eagles went unbeaten in the 2011 regular season and reached the state semifinals, finishing 13–1.

He left Vermilion Catholic after one season in 2012 to come back to Northside High and become their head football coach. He resigned on October 9, 2015, and finished with a record of 11–21. He was then offered the position of business teacher at Acadiana High School.

Faulk became the head football coach at Lafayette Christian Academy in March 2016. In March 2019, the Louisiana High School Athletic Association (LHSAA) suspended Faulk along with basketball coach Devin Lantier for one calendar year. The suspension prevented them from performing any coaching duty at all LHSAA schools at any level in all sports. It was due to a policy that required head coaches for football and basketball to be faculty members at the school, whereas Faulk was working as a volunteer. LCA filed a lawsuit against the LHSAA in response to the sanctions. In September 2019, an apparent agreement was reached between the LCA and LHSAA, and Faulk resumed duties ahead the first game of the 2019 season, coaching from the press box. The Knights won the state championship under Faulk for four straight years, from 2017 to 2020. They fell short of winning a fifth title, losing 27–32 to St. Charles in the Division III championship. Faulk now is the Director of Football Operations at Lafayette Renaissance Charter High School, 306 Acadian Hills Ln, Lafayette, LA 70507

== Personal life ==
Faulk is the cousin of former New England Patriots running back Kevin Faulk, who is the son of his late aunt. There are conflicting reports of them being distantly related to former Indianapolis Colts and Rams running back Marshall Faulk.
