= Kendra Norman-Bellamy =

American novelist

Kendra Norman (formerly writing as Kendra Norman-Bellamy)
- Born: December 17, 1966 (age 59); West Palm Beach, Florida, U.S.
- Education: Valdosta Technical College
- Occupations: Author, Journalist, Pastor
- Spouse: Michael Holmes
- Children: 3
- Writing career
- Period: 2002-present
- Genres: Christian fiction; Christian nonfiction
- Website: royaltywriter.net

Kendra Norman (born December 17, 1966) is an African-American writer of Christian fiction and non-fiction Christian literature. Her novels are praised for their positive male lead characters and their combined romantic and suspenseful story lines.

== Biography ==
Kendra Norman is a native of West Palm Beach, Florida, but spent most of her formative years in southern Georgia. She graduated from Brooks County High School in Quitman, Georgia.

Kendra and her husband, Michael Holmes, have a blended family of two daughters and one son. Her first husband, Jimmy (whose last name was also Holmes - no relation to Michael) died. She and Jimmy married at St. Paul African Methodist Episcopal Church in Valdosta, GA when Kendra was 21 and Jimmy was 20. Shortly after their daughter was born, Jimmy was diagnosed with AIDS, possibly as the result of a blood transfusion. He died on October 5, 1995, a few days before their 7th wedding anniversary, and in her grief, Kendra began to write.

Her first novel, For Love & Grace, was published in 2002. She worked days, and in the evenings, she pursued higher education at Valdosta Technical College (Valdosta, Georgia), where she majored in Information Office Technology and graduated in 1997. There, she was inducted into the National Vocational Technical Honor Society. She was given a computer as a college graduation gift. She and her current husband, Michael married in 2014. In 2017, Kendra and Michael jointly wrote a 31-day relationship devotional entitled Cross-Fire. It was her twenty-second published work and her husband's first. Kendra received a Doctor of Divinity degree from St. Thomas Christian University in (Jacksonville, Florida) in 2019. As an ordained and consecrated minister, Kendra is the senior pastor of Deliverance Revival Church in Central Georgia.

Previously writing under the pen name Kendra Norman-Bellamy, she began officially writing as Kendra Norman in 2013.

=== Career ===
Kendra is the founder and creative director of Royalty Publications LLC (formerly KNB Publications), an independent self-publishing house that produces the works of writers of Christian-based fiction, nonfiction, and poetry. She is the creator and host of "The W.A.R. Cry", a gospel radio show that airs each weekend on Highest Praise Radio.

She self-published her debut novel, For Love & Grace in 2002. The book was re-released in 2004 through BET Books.

Kendra gained national bestseller status when her third release, Crossing Jhordan's River (Moody Publishers/May 2005), peaked at #1 on Essence magazine's best sellers list for paperback fiction.

The majority of her works have been produced through three large book publishers: Moody Publishers (Lift Every Voice imprint), Kimani Press (New Spirit imprint), and Urban Books (Urban Christian imprint).

In 2020, Kendra became the first African American to be managing editor for Houston Home Journal newspaper in its 150-year history. In 2022, she left her corporate job and created an independent faith-based digital newspaper, The Royal Trumpet.

== Bibliography ==
Her published works include:

- For Love & Grace (Guardian Books, 2002 / re-released BET Books, 2004)
- A Love So Strong (Moody Publishers, 2004)
- Thicker Than Water anthology (BET Books, 2005)
- Crossing Jhordan's River (Moody Publishers, 2005)
- Because of Grace (BET Books, 2005)
- The Midnight Clear anthology (KNB Publications, 2006)
- Three Fifty-Seven A.M. (Urban Books, 2006)
- One Prayer Away (Moody Publishers, 2006)
- In Greene Pastures (Urban Books, 2006)
- More Than Grace (BET Books, 2006)
- This Far By Faith anthology (Kimani, 2008)
- Battle of Jericho (Urban Books, 2008)
- The Lyons Den (Urban Books, 2009)
- The Morning After (Urban Books, 2010)
- Fifteen Years (Moody Publishers, 2010)
- Song of Solomon (Urban Books, 2010)
- I Shall Not Die (KNB Publications, 2010 / re-released Royalty Publications, 2016) *non-fiction
- Upon This Rock (Urban Books, 2011)
- When Solomon Sings (Urban Books, 2012)
- The Path From Pain to Purpose (Royalty Publications, 2014) *non-fiction
- Blondeva's Boys (Royalty Publications, 2016)
- Cross-Fire (Royalty Publications, 2017) *daily devotional
- My Grace is Sufficient (Royalty Publications, 2023)

== Awards ==
- 2004: Best BET Romance of the Year, Shades of Romance Magazine
- 2004: Best Multi-cultural Christian Fiction Author, Shades of Romance Magazine
- 2004: Best Multi-cultural Christian Romance, Shades of Romance Magazine
- 2005: Best Christian Author, Memphis Black Writer's Conference
- 2006: African American Literary Award for Best Christian Fiction
- 2007: African American Literary Award for Best Romance
- 2008: African American Literary Award for Best Anthology
- 2008: African American Literary Award for Best Christian Fiction
- 2009: Best Anthology of the Decade, EDC Creations
- 2013: Georgia Excellence Award (Royalty Publications), Small Business Institute for Excellence in Commerce
- 2014: Trailblazer Award, I Inspire To Write Author Explosion
- 2022: Heritage Award, Jubilee of Reading 20th Anniversary Conference
