= Marques Ogden =

American football player (born 1980)

No. 10, 55, 69
- Positions: Offensive tackle, center

Personal information
- Born: November 15, 1980 (age 45); Washington, D.C., U.S.
- Listed height: 6 ft 6 in (1.98 m)
- Listed weight: 312 lb (142 kg)

Career information
- High school: St. John's College (Washington, D.C.)
- College: Howard
- NFL draft: 2003: 6th round, 193rd overall pick

Career history
- Jacksonville Jaguars (2003–2004); Scottish Claymores (2004); Baltimore Ravens (2004-2005)*; Buffalo Bills (2005–2007); Tennessee Titans (2007); Reading Express (2010–2012); Triangle Torch (2016)
- * Offseason or practice squad member only

Marques Ogden (born November 15, 1980) is an American former professional football offensive tackle and center. He was selected by the Jacksonville Jaguars in the sixth round of the 2003 NFL draft. He had stints with the Jaguars, Scottish Claymores, Baltimore Ravens, Buffalo Bills, Tennessee Titans, Reading Express and Triangle Torch. He is the brother of Hall of Fame offensive tackle Jonathan Ogden.

== Education and early career ==
Ogden graduated from Howard University in 2002 with a Bachelor of Science in Finance, with an emphasis on construction and cost accounting. While at Howard, he played for the NCAA Division I football team. In 2005, he participated in a University of Southern California program on project development and construction, designed specifically for NFL players preparing for post-football careers.

== After retirement ==
After retiring from the NFL, Ogden formed a company called Kayden Premier Enterprises Inc., an earth-moving company based out of Baltimore, Maryland. After going out of business in 2012, he received financial aid from the Gene Upshaw Players Assistance Trust Fund. He has since become a public speaker and has been involved with the National Youth Football Organization in a coach-like role.

While developing his business from 2013 to 2016, Marques took on various roles including speaking at small events and working as a birthday clown and a private football coach. Eventually, Marques landed his first formal speaking event when he spoke at Miller-Motte College in Wilmington, North Carolina, for their 100th commencement ceremony.

== Awards ==
- Top 100 MBE Winners through the Center for Business Inclusion and Diversity sponsored by The University of Maryland, Southwest Airlines, and greiBO media (2010)
- Winner of the Rising Star Under Age 40 Award from Living Classrooms and Stevenson University (2010)
- Selected for Greater Baltimore Committee Leadership Council (2010)
- Nominated for the Mayor's Business Recognition Award through the Greater Baltimore Committee Program.
- Invited to become an honorary member of the Morgan State University Business Honor Program (2010)
