= Andre Lott =

American football player (born 1979)

No. 34, 30
- Position: Safety

Personal information
- Born: May 31, 1979 (age 47); Memphis, Tennessee, U.S.
- Listed height: 5 ft 10 in (1.78 m)
- Listed weight: 196 lb (89 kg)

Career information
- High school: Melrose (Memphis)
- College: Tennessee
- NFL draft: 2002: 5th round, 159th overall pick

Career history
- Washington Redskins (2002–2004); San Diego Chargers (2006); Chicago Bears (2006); Pittsburgh Steelers (2006)

Awards and highlights
- BCS national champion (1998); First-team All-SEC (2001); Second-team All-SEC (2000)

Career NFL statistics
- Tackles: 39
- Sacks: 1
- Passes defended: 1
- Stats at Pro Football Reference

Andre Marquette Lott (born May 31, 1979) is an American former professional football player who was a safety in the National Football League (NFL). He played college football for the Tennessee Volunteers and was selected by the Washington Redskins in the fifth round of the 2002 NFL draft with the 159th overall pick. He retired in 2007. Lott is a member of Kappa Alpha Psi fraternity. He played in four seasons for Washington and San Diego. Lott was head football coach at St. George's School.
