= Adonis Thomas =

American basketball player (born 1993)

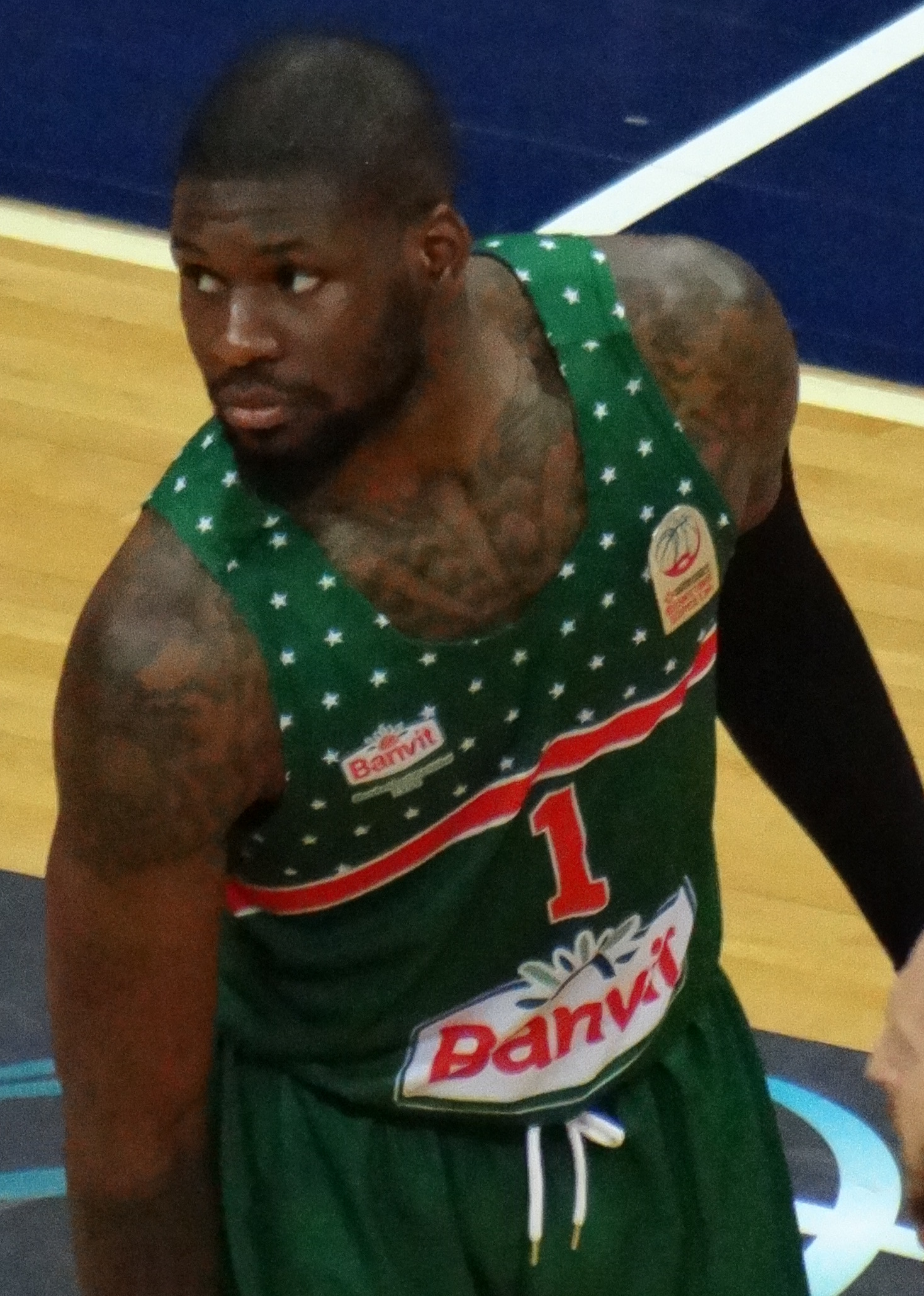

No. 3 – Rahoveci
- Position: Small forward / shooting guard
- League: Kosovo Basketball Superleague

Personal information
- Born: March 25, 1993 (age 33) Memphis, Tennessee, U.S.
- Listed height: 6 ft 6 in (1.98 m)
- Listed weight: 232 lb (105 kg)

Career information
- High school: Melrose (Memphis, Tennessee)
- College: Memphis (2011–2013)
- NBA draft: 2013: undrafted
- Playing career: 2013–present

Career history
- 2013–2014: Springfield Armor
- 2014: Orlando Magic
- 2014: Springfield Armor
- 2014: Philadelphia 76ers
- 2014–2015: Grand Rapids Drive
- 2016–2017: Sidigas Avellino
- 2017–2018: Banvit
- 2018–2019: Medi Bayreuth
- 2019–2020: BCM Gravelines-Dunkerque
- 2020: Mineros de Zacatecas
- 2020–2021: BC Astana
- 2021–2022: Krka
- 2022–2023: Stal Ostrów Wielkopolski
- 2023–2024: Bnei Herzliya
- 2024: Mineros de Zacatecas
- 2024–2025: Macau Black Bears
- 2025–2026: Al Sadd
- 2026–present: KB Rahoveci

Career highlights
- ENBL winner (2023); Polish Supercup winner (2022); All-NBA D-League Third Team (2015); NBA D-League All-Star (2015); NBA D-League All-Rookie First Team (2014); Third-team All-Conference USA (2013); First-team Parade All-American (2011); McDonald's All-American (2011)
- Stats at NBA.com
- Stats at Basketball Reference
Medals
Men's basketball
Representing the United States
FIBA World U17 Championship
Gold medal – first place	2010 Hamburg	National team

Adonis Michael Thomas (born March 25, 1993) is an American professional basketball player for Rahoveci 029. He played college basketball for the University of Memphis.

== High school career ==
Thomas attended Melrose High School in Memphis, Tennessee. As a senior, he averaged 19.2 points, 12.3 rebounds, 4.9 blocks, 4.1 assists and 3.6 steals in helping lead Melrose to a 26–7 overall record.

== College career ==
In his freshman season at Memphis, Thomas saw action in the first 16 games of the season before missing the next 16 contests as a result of an ankle injury (torn superior lateral peroneal tendon retinaculum) that required surgery and rehab, only managing to return to action in the postseason. In 19 games (8 starts), he averaged 8.8 points and 3.2 rebounds in 23.9 minutes per game.

In his sophomore season, Thomas was named to the 2013 All-Conference USA third team. In 36 games, he averaged 11.7 points, 4.5 rebounds and 1.9 assists per game. Memphis (31–5), which went unbeaten in the Conference USA in 2012–13 with a 16–0 mark, lost to Michigan State in the third round of the NCAA tournament.

In April 2013, Thomas signed with an agent and declared for the NBA draft, forgoing his final two years of college eligibility.

== Professional career ==
=== 2013–14 season ===
After going undrafted in the 2013 NBA draft, Thomas joined the Atlanta Hawks for the 2013 NBA Summer League. On September 30, 2013, he signed with the Hawks, only to be waived by the team on October 14 after appearing in one preseason game. Four days later, he signed with the Brooklyn Nets. However, he was waived by the Nets on October 26.

On November 1, 2013, Thomas was acquired by the Springfield Armor of the NBA Development League as an affiliate player. On February 25, 2014, he signed a 10-day contract with the Orlando Magic. On March 7, he signed a second 10-day contract with the Magic. On March 17, the Magic did not offer him a rest of season contract, and he returned to the Springfield Armor. On April 7, he signed a 10-day contract with the Philadelphia 76ers. In six NBA games during the 2013–14 season, Thomas averaged 2.3 points per game.

=== 2014–15 season ===
In July 2014, Thomas joined the Brooklyn Nets for the Orlando Summer League and the Philadelphia 76ers for the Las Vegas Summer League. On September 5, 2014, he signed with the Indiana Pacers. However, he was later waived by the Pacers on October 25 after appearing in four preseason games. On November 1, he was acquired by the Grand Rapids Drive of the NBA Development League. On February 4, 2015, he was named to the Futures All-Star team for the 2015 D-League All-Star Game. In 51 games for the Drive in 2014–15, he averaged 18.9 points, 4.9 rebounds and 1.6 assists per game.

=== 2015–16 season ===
On July 23, 2015, Thomas signed with the Detroit Pistons after averaging 8.6 points and 4.0 rebounds in five summer league games. Thomas suffered a calf muscle injury in the team's public scrimmage to end the first week of training camp and subsequently missed 10 days. He made his only preseason appearance against the Indiana Pacers on October 13, but he aggravated the injury after a 10-minute stint and wasn't able to return to action after that. He was later waived by the Pistons on October 23. On October 31, he returned to the Grand Rapids Drive. On December 4, he was waived by the Drive due to a season-ending wrist injury.

=== 2016–17 season ===
On August 26, 2016, Thomas signed a one-year deal with Sidigas Avellino of the Lega Basket Serie A.

=== 2017–18 season ===
Following the 2016–17 campaign, Thomas signed with Banvit of the Turkish Basketball Super League. He averaged 8.6 points and 3.4 rebounds per game in Turkey.

=== 2018–19 season ===
On August 7, 2018, Thomas signed with Medi Bayreuth of the Basketball Bundesliga.

=== 2019–20 season ===
On September 14, 2019, he has signed with BCM Gravelines-Dunkerque of the LNB Pro A.

On January 22, 2020, he has signed with Mineros de Zacatecas of the Liga Nacional de Baloncesto Profesional.

=== 2020–21 season ===
On August 13, 2020, Thomas signed with BC Astana of the Kazakhstan Championship and the VTB United League.

=== 2022–23 season ===
On July 28, 2022, he has signed with Stal Ostrów Wielkopolski of the Polish Basketball League (PLK).

=== 2023–24 season ===
On November 19, 2023, he signed with Bnei Herzliya of the Israeli Basketball Premier League.

=== 2024–25 season ===
In December 2024, Thomas signed with the Macau Black Bears of the East Asia Super League.

=== The Basketball Tournament ===
In 2017, Thomas participated in The Basketball Tournament with Blue Zoo. The team lost in the first round of the tournament. The Basketball Tournament is an annual $2 million winner-take-all tournament broadcast on ESPN.

In TBT 2018, Thomas played for Team Memphis State. He averaged a team-high 18.5 points per game and 3.5 assists per game on 50 percent shooting, including a first-round game-winner to defeat the Brooklyn Vultures 72–63. Team Memphis State lost in the second round to Team DRC.

== NBA career statistics ==
Legend
GP	Games played	GS	Games started	MPG	Minutes per game
FG%	Field goal percentage	3P%	3-point field goal percentage	FT%	Free throw percentage
RPG	Rebounds per game	APG	Assists per game	SPG	Steals per game
BPG	Blocks per game	PPG	Points per game	**Bold**	Career high

=== Regular season ===
Year	Team	GP	GS	MPG	FG%	3P%	FT%	RPG	APG	SPG	BPG	PPG
2013–14	Orlando	**4**	0	6.0	.333	.000	**1.000**	**.8**	**.5**	.0	.0	1.8
2013–14	Philadelphia	2	**1**	**6.5**	**.600**	**.500**	–	.0	**.5**	.0	.0	**3.5**
Career		6	1	6.2	.429	.200	1.000	.5	.5	.0	.0	2.3
