= Curtis Randall =

American football player (born 1979)

No. 50, 49
- Position: Linebacker

Personal information
- Born: August 6, 1979 (age 47); Columbus, Georgia, U.S.
- Listed height: 6 ft 3 in (1.91 m)
- Listed weight: 225 lb (102 kg)

Career information
- High school: Central Catholic (Morgan City, Louisiana)
- College: Louisiana Tech (1999–2002)
- NFL draft: 2003: undrafted

Career history
- Jacksonville Jaguars (2003–2004)*; → Rhein Fire (2004); Carolina Panthers (2004)*; Seattle Seahawks (2004)
- * Offseason or practice squad member only

Awards and highlights
- First-team All-WAC (2002); Second-team All-WAC (2001)

Career NFL statistics
- Games played: 4
- Tackles: 3
- Stats at Pro Football Reference

Curtis Mandell Randall (born August 6, 1979) is an American former professional football linebacker who played in the National Football League (NFL) for the Jacksonville Jaguars, Carolina Panthers and Seattle Seahawks. He played college football for the Louisiana Tech Bulldogs. Randall also had a stint in NFL Europe with the Rhein Fire.

== Early life ==
Randall was born on August 6, 1979, in Columbus, Georgia. He attended Central Catholic High School in Morgan City, Louisiana.

== College career ==
Randall played college football for the Louisiana Tech Bulldogs from 1999 to 2002. As a senior, he had 77 tackles, including 13.5 for loss, three sacks and five pass breakups. Randall was named to the second-team All-WAC team in 2001 and first-team in 2002. He finished with 196 tackles, 28 for loss, nine sacks.

== Professional career ==
=== Jacksonville Jaguars ===
After going undrafted in the 2003 NFL draft, Randall signed with the Jacksonville Jaguars as an undrafted free agent. On August 31, he was waived by the team. On November 27, Randall was signed to the practice squad. On December 29, he signed a reserve/futures contract with the Jaguars. On June 14, 2004, Randall was released.

=== Rhein Fire ===
On February 8, 2004, Randall was allocated to the Rhein Fire of NFL Europe. In five games, he recorded 14 tackles and one pass break ups.

=== Carolina Panthers ===
On August 17, 2004, Randall was signed by the Carolina Panthers. On August 30, he was waived by the team.

=== Seattle Seahawks ===
On October 27, 2004, the Seattle Seahawks signed Randall to the practice squad. On November 20, he was elevated to the active roster. Randall played in four games, registering three tackles. On December 21, he was placed on the injured reserve with a hamstring injury. Randall became a unrestricted free agent at the end of the season.
