= LSU Tigers football statistical leaders =

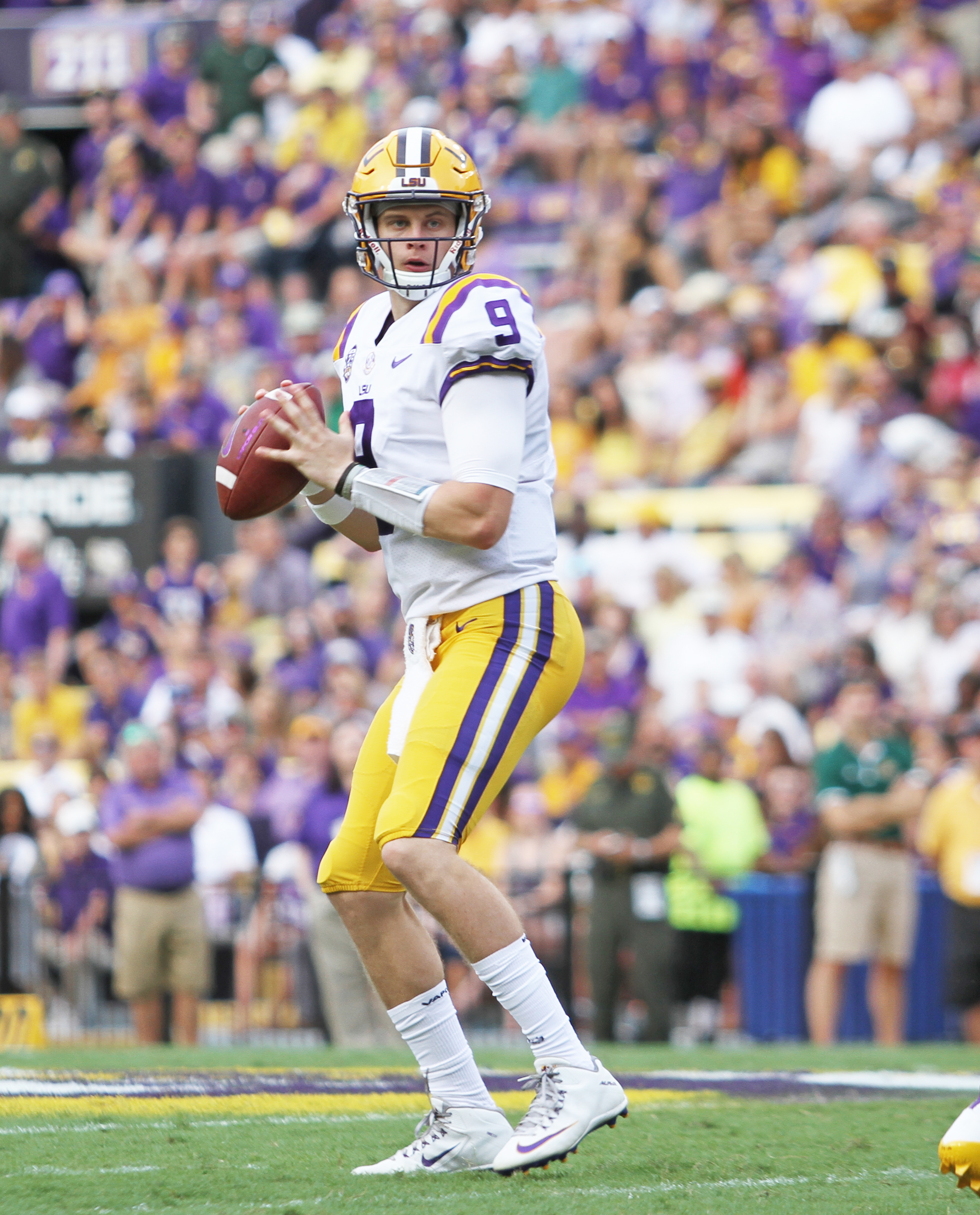
Joe Burrow holds single-season school records in passing yards, total offense, passing touchdowns, and touchdowns responsible for. Despite playing for only two seasons at LSU, he leads the school in career passing touchdowns, touchdowns responsible for, and total offense, and is second in career passing yards.

The LSU Tigers football statistical leaders are individual statistical leaders of the LSU Tigers football program in various categories, including passing, rushing, receiving, total offense, defensive stats, and kicking. Within those areas, the lists identify single-game, single-season, and career leaders. The Tigers represent Louisiana State University in the NCAA's Southeastern Conference.

Although LSU began competing in intercollegiate football in 1893, the school's official record book does not generally include full statistics before the 1950s, as records from that period are often inconsistent and incomplete. Records set before then are occasionally included in the lists below if the statistics are available, but they generally are not.

These lists are dominated by more recent players for several reasons:

- Since 1949, seasons have increased from 10 games to 11 and then 12 games in length.
- The NCAA did not allow freshmen to play varsity football until 1972 (except the World War II years), allowing players to have four-year careers.
- Bowl games only began counting toward single-season and career statistics in 2002. The Tigers have played in a bowl game every year since then, giving recent players an extra game per season to accumulate statistics. Similarly, the Tigers have played in the SEC Championship Game six times since it was first played in 1992. In an extreme example, players in the 2019 season had three extra games to accumulate statistics—the SEC Championship Game, the Peach Bowl (which was a College Football Playoff semifinal), and the College Football Playoff National Championship.
- The Tigers have eclipsed 5,000 total offensive yards in a season 10 times in school history, all of them coming in the 21st century.

These lists are updated through the end of the 2025 season.

== Passing ==
=== Passing yards ===
Career
Rank	Player	Yards	Years
1	Tommy Hodson	9,115	1986 1987 1988 1989
2	Joe Burrow	8,565 (Note: Burrow began his college career in 2015 at Ohio State, redshirting that season before playing his first game in 2016. He graduated from Ohio State in 2018 with two remaining seasons of athletic eligibility and transferred to LSU, becoming eligible to play immediately under NCAA graduate transfer regulations.)	2018 2019
3	Garrett Nussmeier	7,699	2021 2022 2023 2024 2025
4	Jeff Wickersham	6,921	1982 1983 1984 1985
5	Jayden Daniels	6,725	2022 2023
6	JaMarcus Russell	6,625	2004 2005 2006
7	Jamie Howard	6,158	1992 1993 1994 1995
8	Herb Tyler	5,876	1995 1996 1997 1998
9	Zach Mettenberger	5,783	2011 2012 2013
10	Jordan Jefferson	4,733	2008 2009 2010 2011

Single season
Rank	Player	Yards	Year
1	Joe Burrow	5,671	2019
2	Garrett Nussmeier	4,052	2024
3	Jayden Daniels	3,812	2023
4	Rohan Davey	3,347	2001
5	JaMarcus Russell	3,129	2006
6	Zach Mettenberger	3,082	2013
7	Jayden Daniels	2,913	2022
8	Joe Burrow	2,894	2018
9	Matt Mauck	2,825	2003
10	Max Johnson	2,815	2021

Single game
Rank	Player	Yards	Year	Opponent
1	Rohan Davey	528	2001	Alabama
2	Joe Burrow	493	2019	Oklahoma (CFP Semifinal Game - Peach Bowl)
3	Joe Burrow	489	2019	Ole Miss
4	Joe Burrow	471	2019	Texas
5	Joe Burrow	463	2019	Clemson (CFP National Championship)
6	Tommy Hodson	438	1989	Tennessee
7	Max Johnson	435	2020	Ole Miss
8	Myles Brennan	430	2020	Missouri
9	Jayden Daniels	414	2023	Ole Miss
10	Jayden Daniels	413	2023	Georgia State

=== Passing touchdowns ===
Career
Rank	Player	TDs	Years
1	Joe Burrow	76	2018 2019
2	Tommy Hodson	69	1986 1987 1988 1989
3	Jayden Daniels	57	2022 2023
4	JaMarcus Russell	52	2004 2005 2006
	Garrett Nussmeier	52	2021 2022 2023 2024 2025
6	Herb Tyler	40	1995 1996 1997 1998
7	Matt Mauck	37	2001 2002 2003
8	Zach Mettenberger	35	2011 2012 2013
	Max Johnson	35	2020 2021
10	Jamie Howard	34	1992 1993 1994 1995
	Jordan Jefferson	34	2008 2009 2010 2011

Single season
Rank	Player	TDs	Year
1	Joe Burrow	60	2019
2	Jayden Daniels	40	2023
3	Garrett Nussmeier	29	2024
4	Matt Mauck	28	2003
	JaMarcus Russell	28	2006
6	Max Johnson	27	2021
7	Tommy Hodson	22	1989
	Zach Mettenberger	22	2013
9	Matt Flynn	21	2007
10	Tommy Hodson	19	1986

Single game
Rank	Player	TDs	Year	Opponent
1	Joe Burrow	7	2019	Oklahoma (CFP Semifinal Game - Peach Bowl)
2	Joe Burrow	6	2019	Vanderbilt
	Jayden Daniels	6	2023	Georgia State
	Garrett Nussmeier	6	2024	Nicholls
5	Zach Mettenberger	5	2013	UAB
	Joe Burrow	5	2019	Georgia Southern
	Joe Burrow	5	2019	Utah State
	Joe Burrow	5	2019	Ole Miss
	Joe Burrow	5	2019	Clemson (CFP National Championship)
	Max Johnson	5	2021	Central Michigan
	Jayden Daniels	5	2023	Grambling

== Rushing ==
=== Rushing yards ===
Career
Rank	Player	Yards	Years
1	Kevin Faulk	4,557	1995 1996 1997 1998
2	Dalton Hilliard	4,050	1982 1983 1984 1985
3	Charles Alexander	4,035	1975 1976 1977 1978
4	Leonard Fournette	3,830	2014 2015 2016
5	Derrius Guice (Note: In 2021, following a sexual harassment scandal stemming in part from multiple allegations of misconduct against Guice, LSU stripped his name from its record books. This article will continue to list Guice.)	3,074	2015 2016 2017
6	Harvey Williams	2,860	1986 1987 1989 1990
7	Joseph Addai	2,577	2001 2002 2003 2004 2005
8	Terry Robiskie	2,517	1973 1974 1975 1976
9	Charles Scott	2,317	2006 2007 2008 2009
10	Rondell Mealey	2,238	1996 1997 1998 1999

Single season
Rank	Player	Yards	Year
1	Leonard Fournette	1,953	2015
2	Charles Alexander	1,686	1977
3	Clyde Edwards-Helaire	1,414	2019
4	Jeremy Hill	1,401	2013
5	Derrius Guice	1,387	2016
6	Kevin Faulk	1,282	1996
7	Kevin Faulk	1,279	1998
8	Dalton Hilliard	1,268	1984
9	Derrius Guice	1,251	2017
10	Charles Scott	1,174	2008

Single game
Rank	Player	Yards	Year	Opponent
1	Tyrion Davis-Price	287	2021	Florida
2	Derrius Guice	285	2016	Texas A&M
3	Leonard Fournette	284	2016	Ole Miss
4	Derrius Guice	276	2017	Ole Miss
5	Derrius Guice	252	2016	Arkansas
6	Alley Broussard	250	2004	Ole Miss
7	Kevin Faulk	246	1996	Houston
8	Leonard Fournette	244	2015	Syracuse
9	Charles Alexander	237	1977	Oregon
10	Kevin Faulk	234	1995	Michigan State
	Jayden Daniels	234	2023	Florida

=== Rushing touchdowns ===
Career
Rank	Player	TDs	Years
1	Kevin Faulk	46	1995 1996 1997 1998
2	Dalton Hilliard	44	1982 1983 1984 1985
3	Charles Alexander	40	1975 1976 1977 1978
	Leonard Fournette	40	2014 2015 2016
5	Charles Scott	32	2006 2007 2008 2009
6	Terry Robiskie	31	1973 1974 1975 1976
7	Rondell Mealey	29	1996 1997 1998 1999
	Derrius Guice	29	2015 2016 2017
9	Jeremy Hill	28	2012 2013
10	Garry James	27	1982 1983 1984 1985
	Harvey Williams	27	1986 1987 1989 1990
	Kenny Hilliard	27	2011 2012 2013 2014

Single season
Rank	Player	TDs	Year
1	Leonard Fournette	22	2015
2	LaBrandon Toefield	19	2001
3	Charles Scott	18	2008
4	Charles Alexander	17	1977
5	Jeremy Hill	16	2013
	Clyde Edwards-Helaire	16	2019
7	Kevin Faulk	15	1997
	Stevan Ridley	15	2010
	Derrius Guice	15	2016
10	Charles Alexander	14	1978
	Dalton Hilliard	14	1985
	Nick Brossette	14	2018

Single game
Rank	Player	TDs	Year	Opponent
1	Kevin Faulk	5	1997	Kentucky
2	Charles Alexander	4	1977	Oregon
	Dalton Hilliard	4	1984	Kentucky
	Harvey Williams	4	1990	Miami (OH)
	Rondell Mealey	4	1996	New Mexico State
	LaBrandon Toefield	4	2001	Utah State
	Leonard Fournette	4	2015	Texas Tech (Texas Bowl)
	Derrius Guice	4	2016	Texas A&M

== Receiving ==
=== Receptions ===
Career
Rank	Player	Rec	Years
1	Malik Nabers	189	2021 2022 2023
2	Wendell Davis	183	1984 1985 1986 1987
3	Michael Clayton	182	2001 2002 2003
4	Brandon LaFell	175	2006 2007 2008 2009
5	Josh Reed	167	1999 2000 2001
6	Justin Jefferson	165	2017 2018 2019
7	Early Doucet	160	2004 2005 2006 2007
8	Dwayne Bowe	154	2003 2004 2005 2006
9	Eric Martin	152	1981 1982 1983 1984
10	Jerel Myers	149	1999 2000

Single season
Rank	Player	Rec	Year
1	Justin Jefferson	111	2019
2	Josh Reed	94	2001
3	Malik Nabers	89	2023
4	Ja'Marr Chase	84	2019
5	Wendell Davis	80	1986
6	Michael Clayton	78	2003
7	Jarvis Landry	77	2013
8	Wendell Davis	72	1987
	Malik Nabers	72	2022
10	Brian Thomas Jr.	68	2023

Single game
Rank	Player	Rec	Year	Opponent
1	Josh Reed	19	2001	Alabama
2	Wendell Davis	14	1986	Ole Miss
	Justin Jefferson	14	2019	Oklahoma (CFP Semifinal Game - Peach Bowl)
	Kayshon Boutte	14	2020	Ole Miss
5	Jerel Myers	13	1999	Auburn
	Malik Nabers	13	2023	Mississippi State
7	Michael Clayton	12	2003	Alabama
	Brandon LaFell	12	2008	Troy
9	Tommy Morel	11	1967	Mississippi State
	Charles Alexander	11	1978	Kentucky
	Wendell Davis	11	1987	Georgia
	Michael Clayton	11	2003	Western Illinois
	Terrace Marshall Jr.	11	2020	Missouri
	Jackson Harris	11	2026	Alabama

=== Receiving yards ===
Career
Rank	Player	Yards	Years
1	Malik Nabers	3,003	2021 2022 2023
2	Josh Reed	3,001	1999 2000 2001
3	Wendell Davis	2,708	1984 1985 1986 1987
4	Eric Martin	2,625	1981 1982 1983 1984
5	Michael Clayton	2,582	2001 2002 2003
6	Brandon LaFell	2,517	2006 2007 2008 2009
7	Justin Jefferson	2,415	2017 2018 2019
8	Dwayne Bowe	2,403	2003 2004 2005 2006
9	Odell Beckham Jr.	2,340	2011 2012 2013
10	Tony Moss	2,196	1986 1987 1988 1989

Single season
Rank	Player	Yards	Year
1	Ja'Marr Chase	1,780	2019
2	Josh Reed	1,740	2001
3	Malik Nabers	1,569	2023
4	Justin Jefferson	1,540	2019
5	Wendell Davis	1,244	1986
6	Jarvis Landry	1,193	2013
7	Brian Thomas Jr.	1,177	2023
8	Odell Beckham Jr.	1,152	2013
9	Josh Reed	1,127	2000
10	Michael Clayton	1,079	2003

Single game
Rank	Player	Yards	Year	Opponent
1	Kayshon Boutte	308	2020	Ole Miss
2	Josh Reed	293	2001	Alabama
3	Todd Kinchen	248	1991	Mississippi State
4	Josh Reed	239	2001	Illinois
	Malik Nabers	239	2023	Mississippi State
6	Terrace Marshall Jr.	235	2020	Missouri
7	Ja'Marr Chase	229	2019	Vanderbilt
8	Ja'Marr Chase	227	2019	Ole Miss
	Justin Jefferson	227	2019	Oklahoma (CFP Semifinal Game - Peach Bowl)
10	Ja'Marr Chase	221	2019	Clemson (CFP National Championship)

=== Receiving touchdowns ===
Career
Rank	Player	TDs	Years
1	Dwayne Bowe	26	2003 2004 2005 2006
2	Brandon LaFell	25	2006 2007 2008 2009
3	Justin Jefferson	24	2017 2018 2019
	Brian Thomas Jr.	24	2021 2022 2023
5	Ja'Marr Chase	23	2018 2019
	Terrace Marshall Jr.	23	2018 2019 2020
7	Michael Clayton	21	2001 2002 2003
	Malik Nabers	21	2021 2022 2023
9	Early Doucet	20	2004 2005 2006 2007
10	Wendell Davis	19	1984 1985 1986 1987
	Devery Henderson	19	2000 2001 2002 2003

Single season
Rank	Player	TDs	Year
1	Ja'Marr Chase	20	2019
2	Justin Jefferson	18	2019
3	Brian Thomas Jr.	17	2023
4	Malik Nabers	14	2023
5	Terrace Marshall Jr.	13	2019
6	Dwayne Bowe	12	2006
7	Wendell Davis	11	1986
	Devery Henderson	11	2003
	Brandon LaFell	11	2009
10	Carlos Carson	10	1977
	Josh Reed	10	2000
	Michael Clayton	10	2003
	Jarvis Landry	10	2013
	Terrace Marshall Jr.	10	2020

Single game
Rank	Player	TDs	Year	Opponent
1	Carlos Carson	5	1977	Rice
2	Tony Moss	4	1989	Ohio
	Ken Kavanaugh	4	1939	Holy Cross
	Ja'Marr Chase	4	2019	Vanderbilt
	Justin Jefferson	4	2019	Oklahoma (CFP Semifinal Game - Peach Bowl)
6	Tommy Morel	3	1967	Mississippi State
	Andy Hamilton	3	1971	Notre Dame
	Gerald Keigley	3	1972	Auburn
	Wendell Davis	3	1986	Tulane
	Wendell Davis	3	1987	South Carolina
	Wendell Davis	3	1987	Ole Miss
	Sheddrick Wilson	3	1995	Rice
	Josh Reed	3	2000	Tennessee
	Devery Henderson	3	2002	Kentucky
	Dwayne Bowe	3	2006	Kentucky
	Terrence Toliver	3	2010	Texas A&M (Cotton Bowl)
	Odell Beckham Jr.	3	2013	UAB
	Travin Dural	3	2014	Sam Houston State
	Terrace Marshall Jr.	3	2019	Georgia Southern
	Justin Jefferson	3	2019	Texas
	Ja'Marr Chase	3	2019	Ole Miss
	Terrace Marshall Jr.	3	2020	Missouri
	Kayshon Boutte	3	2020	Ole Miss
	Kayshon Boutte	3	2021	UCLA
	Jaray Jenkins	3	2021	Florida
	Brian Thomas Jr.	3	2023	Ole Miss
	Kyren Lacy	3	2024	Nicholls

== Total offense ==
Total offense is the sum of passing and rushing statistics. It does not include receiving or returns.

=== Total offense yards ===
Career
Rank	Player	Yards	Years
1	Joe Burrow	9,332	2018 2019
2	Tommy Hodson	8,938	1986 1987 1988 1989
3	Jayden Daniels	8,744	2022 2023
4	Garrett Nussmeier	7,546	2021 2022 2023 2024 2025
5	Jeff Wickersham	6,705	1982 1983 1984 1985
6	JaMarcus Russell	6,704	2004 2005 2006
7	Herb Tyler	6,654	1995 1996 1997 1998
8	Jordan Jefferson	5,751	2008 2009 2010 2011
9	Jamie Howard	5,560	1992 1993 1994 1995
10	Zach Mettenberger	5,470	2011 2012 2013

Single season
Rank	Player	Yards	Year
1	Joe Burrow	6,039	2019
2	Jayden Daniels	4,946	2023
3	Garrett Nussmeier	4,014	2024
4	Jayden Daniels	3,798	2022
5	Rohan Davey	3,351	2001
6	Joe Burrow	3,293	2018
7	JaMarcus Russell	2,949	2006
8	Zach Mettenberger	2,922	2013
9	Max Johnson	2,774	2021
10	Matt Mauck	2,622	2003

Single game
Rank	Player	Yards	Year	Opponent
1	Jayden Daniels	606	2023	Florida
2	Rohan Davey	540	2001	Alabama
3	Joe Burrow	521	2019	Clemson (CFP National Championship)
4	Joe Burrow	515	2019	Ole Miss
	Joe Burrow	515	2019	Oklahoma (CFP Semifinal Game - Peach Bowl)
6	Jayden Daniels	513	2023	Ole Miss
7	Jayden Daniels	509	2023	Georgia State
8	Max Johnson	480	2020	Ole Miss
9	Joe Burrow	479	2019	Texas
10	Joe Burrow	457	2019	Alabama

=== Touchdowns responsible for ===
"Touchdowns responsible for" is the official NCAA term for combined passing and rushing touchdowns.

Career
Rank	Player	TDs	Years
1	Joe Burrow	88	2018 2019
2	Jayden Daniels	78	2022 2023
3	Tommy Hodson	71	1986 1987 1988 1989
4	Herb Tyler	63	1995 1996 1997 1998
5	Garrett Nussmeier	57	2021 2022 2023 2024 2025
6	JaMarcus Russell	56	2004 2005 2006
7	Kevin Faulk	47	1995 1996 1997 1998
8	Jordan Jefferson	46	2008 2009 2010 2011

Single season
Rank	Player	TDs	Year
1	Joe Burrow	65	2019
2	Jayden Daniels	50	2023
3	Garrett Nussmeier	32	2024
4	Matt Mauck	29	2003
	JaMarcus Russell	29	2006
6	Max Johnson	28	2021
	Jayden Daniels	28	2022
8	Herb Tyler	25	1998
	Matt Flynn	25	2007
10	Tommy Hodson	24	1989

Single game
Rank	Player	TDs	Year	Opponent
1	Joe Burrow	8	2019	Oklahoma (CFP Semifinal Game - Peach Bowl)
	Jayden Daniels	8	2023	Georgia State
3	Joe Burrow	6	2018	Texas A&M
	Joe Burrow	6	2019	Vanderbilt
	Joe Burrow	6	2019	Utah State
	Joe Burrow	6	2019	Clemson (CFP National Championship)
	Jayden Daniels	6	2022	Florida
	Garrett Nussmeier	6	2024	Nicholls
9	16 times by 10 players	5	Most recent: Jayden Daniels, 2023 vs. Florida	

== Defense ==
=== Interceptions ===
Career
Rank	Player	Ints	Years
1	Chris Williams	20	1977 1978 1979 1980
2	Corey Webster	16	2001 2002 2003 2004
3	Charles Oakley	12	1951 1952 1953
	Craig Burns	12	1968 1969 1970
	LaRon Landry	12	2003 2004 2005 2006
6	Greg Jackson	11	1985 1986 1987 1988
	Tory James	11	1992 1993 1994 1995
	Craig Steltz	11	2004 2005 2006 2007
	Morris Claiborne	11	2009 2010 2011

Single season
Rank	Player	Ints	Year
1	Craig Burns	8	1970
	Chris Williams	8	1978
3	Greg Jackson	7	1988
	Cedric Donaldson	7	1997
	Corey Webster	7	2002
	Corey Webster	7	2003
7	Jerry Joseph	6	1965
	Chris Williams	6	1980
	Liffort Hobley	6	1984
	Chris Carrier	6	1986
	Craig Steltz	6	2007
	Morris Claiborne	6	2011
	Greedy Williams	6	2017
	Derek Stingley Jr.	6	2019

Single game
Rank	Player	Ints	Year	Opponent
1	Kenny Konz	3	1949	Tulane
	Jerry Joseph	3	1965	Kentucky
	Craig Burns	3	1970	Ole Miss
	Clinton Burrell	3	1975	Tulane
	Chris Williams	3	1978	Rice
	Corey Webster	3	2002	Florida
	Craig Steltz	3	2007	Mississippi State
	Grant Delpit	3	2018	Mississippi State

=== Tackles ===
Career
Rank	Player	Tackles	Years
1	Al Richardson	452	1979 1980 1981 1982
2	Bradie James	418	1999 2000 2001 2002
3	Lawrence Williams	386	1979 1980 1981 1982
4	Steve Cassidy	346	1972 1973 1974 1975
5	Shawn Burks	336	1983 1984 1985
6	Lyman White	316	1977 1978 1979 1980
7	Ryan Clark	315	1998 1999 2000 2001
	LaRon Landry	315	2003 2004 2005 2006
9	Kelvin Sheppard	311	2007 2008 2009 2010
10	Toby Caston	305	1983 1984 1985 1986

Single season
Rank	Player	Tackles	Year
1	Bradie James	154	2002
2	Al Richardson	150	1981
3	Lawrence Williams	144	1981
4	Damone Clark	136	2021
5	Devin White	133	2017
6	Kevin Minter	130	2012
7	Al Richardson	129	1980
8	Lawrence Williams	123	1982
9	Devin White	123	2018
10	Steve Cassidy	122	1975

Single game (Note: The 2019 LSU Football Media Guide lists only the top 2 (and ties), rather than a top 10.)
Rank	Player	Tackles	Year	Opponent
1	Al Richardson	21	1982	South Carolina
2	Toby Caston	20	1986	Georgia
	Rudy Harmon	20	1988	Florida
	Kevin Minter	20	2012	Florida

=== Sacks ===
Career
Rank	Player	Sacks	Years
1	Rydell Melancon	25.0	1980 1981 1982 1983
2	Ron Sancho	23.0	1985 1986 1987 1988
3	Gabe Northern	21.0	1992 1993 1994 1995
	Arden Key	21.0	2015 2016 2017
5	Jarvis Green	20.0	1998 1999 2000 2001
	Melvin Oliver	20.0	2002 2003 2004 2005
7	Chuck Wiley	19.0	1994 1995 1996 1997
	Marcus Spears	19.0	2001 2002 2003 2004
	Sam Montgomery	19.0	2010 2011 2012
10	Michael Brooks	18.0	1983 1984 1985 1986
	James Gillyard	18.0	1992 1993 1994 1995

Single season
Rank	Player	Sacks	Year
1	Arden Key	12.0	2016
2	Gabe Northern	11.0	1994
3	Rydell Melancon	10.0	1981
4	Ron Sancho	9.0	1987
	Gabe Northern	9.0	1995
	Marcus Spears	9.0	2004
	Melvin Oliver	9.0	2005
	Sam Montgomery	9.0	2011
9	Tyson Jackson	8.5	2006
	Harold Perkins	8.5	2022
	Bradyn Swinson	8.5	2024

Single game (Note: The 2019 LSU Football Media Guide lists only a leader, plus the most recent player to have tied for second place, in this category, rather than a top 10.)
Rank	Player	Sacks	Year	Opponent
1	Chuck Wiley	4.0	1995	South Carolina
	Harold Perkins	4.0	2022	Arkansas
3	Numerous times	3	Most recent: Princewill Umanmielen, 2026 vs. Louisiana Tech	

== Kicking ==
=== Field goals made ===
Career
Rank	Player	FGs	Years
1	Damian Ramos	69	2022 2023 2024 2025
2	David Browndyke	61	1986 1987 1988 1989
3	Colt David	54	2005 2006 2007 2008
	Cade York	54	2019 2020 2021
5	John Corbello	50	1999 2000 2001 2002
6	Josh Jasper	47	2008 2009 2010
7	André LaFleur	37	1993 1994 1995
	Drew Alleman	37	2011 2012
9	Juan Betanzos	36	1982 1983 1984
10	Colby Delahoussaye	35	2013 2014 2015 2016

Single season
Rank	Player	FGs	Year
1	Cole Tracy	29	2018
2	Colt David	26	2007
3	Damian Ramos	24	2025
4	Damian Ramos	23	2024
5	Drew Alleman	21	2012
	Cade York	21	2019
7	David Browndyke	19	1988
8	Cade York	18	2020
9	John Corbello	17	2002
	Josh Jasper	17	2009

Single game
Rank	Player	FGs	Year	Opponent
1	Josh Jasper	5	2010	Mississippi State
2	16 times by 10 players	4	Most recent: Damian Ramos, 2024 vs. Arkansas	

=== Field goal percentage ===
Career
Rank	Player	FG%	Years
1	Cole Tracy	87.9%	2018
2	Josh Jasper	83.9%	2008 2009 2010
3	Cade York	81.8%	2019 2020 2021
4	David Browndyke	81.3%	1986 1987 1988 1989
5	David Johnston	80.0%	1980 1981
6	Colby Delahoussaye	79.5%	2013 2014 2015 2016
7	Damian Ramos	79.3%	2022 2023 2024 2025
8	Drew Alleman	78.7%	2011 2012
9	Colt David	75.0%	2005 2006 2007 2008
10	André LaFleur	74.0%	1993 1994 1995

Single season
Rank	Player	FG%	Year
1	David Browndyke	100.0%	1989
2	Mike Conway	93.3%	1978
3	Colby Delahoussaye	92.9%	2013
4	Drew Alleman	88.9%	2011
5	Pedro Suarez	88.2%	1990
6	Cole Tracy	87.9%	2018
7	Cade York	85.7%	2020
8	Cade York	83.3%	2021
9	Damian Ramos	82.8%	2025
10	David Browndyke	82.6%	1988
