= Ovey Comeaux High School =

Location
- 100 West Bluebird Drive; Lafayette, (Lafayette Parish), Louisiana 70508; United States; 30°9′25″N 92°1′55″W

Information
- Type: Public high school
- Established: 1966
- Status: Closed
- Closed: 2026
- School district: Lafayette Parish Public Schools
- Oversight: Lafayette Parish Public Schools
- Principal: Catherine Cassidy
- Teaching staff: 64.29 (on an FTE basis)
- Grades: 9–12
- Enrollment: 982 (2023–2024)
- Student to teacher ratio: 15.27
- Colors: Red, white, and blue
- Mascot: Spartans
- Nickname: Spartans
- Rival: Lafayette High School, Southside High School
- Yearbook: Spartica
- School hours: 7:05 AM to 2:35 PM
- Website: http://www.lpssonline.com/comeauxhigh

Ovey Comeaux High School was a public high school in Lafayette, Louisiana, United States. It was operated by the Lafayette Parish Public Schools.

The school was established in 1966 and served students in grades 9 through 12. Ovey Comeaux High School closed at the conclusion of the 2025–2026 school year after the Lafayette Parish School Board voted to take the school offline and repurpose the campus.

The former high school campus is planned to become the Ovey Comeaux Workforce Innovation Academy. The Lafayette Parish School Board plans to renovate the campus to accommodate the W. D. & Mary Baker Smith Career Center and E. J. Sam Accelerated School of Lafayette. The former athletic facilities are also planned to be repurposed as a centralized sports complex for Lafayette Parish schools.

== Athletics ==
Comeaux High School athletics competed in the LHSAA.

Sporting programs included marching band, wrestling, track and field, soccer, football, basketball, baseball, softball, volleyball, golf, tennis, cross country, swimming, and bowling.

== Feeder schools ==
During its operation, Comeaux High School served students from several middle schools in southern Lafayette Parish, including Broussard Middle School, Youngsville Middle School, Milton Middle School, and Paul Breaux Middle School.

== Notable alumni ==
- Lance Lantier, former Executive Officer and Commanding Officer of USS Rentz (FFG-46), featured on the television program Drug Wars, and former staff member of the National Security Commission on Artificial Intelligence.
- Malik Nabers, professional football wide receiver for the New York Giants of the National Football League (NFL). Nabers was selected by the Giants sixth overall in the 2024 NFL draft out of LSU. Nabers transferred to Southside High School prior to his senior year.
- Ted Scott (caddie), professional golf caddie who has worked with Bubba Watson and Scottie Scheffler.
- Brandon Stokley, former wide receiver for the Denver Broncos and Baltimore Ravens.
- Tre Harris III, college football wide receiver for the Ole Miss Rebels, who previously played for the Louisiana Tech Bulldogs.
