= Youngsville, Louisiana =

- City
- City of Youngsville
- Location in Lafayette Parish, Louisiana

- Location of Louisiana in the United States
- Coordinates: 30°06′02″N 91°59′27″W
- Country: United States
- State: Louisiana
- Parish: Lafayette

Government
  - Mayor: Ken Ritter

Area
  - Total: 12.45 sq mi (32.25 km^{2})
  - Land: 12.45 sq mi (32.25 km^{2})
  - Water: 0 sq mi (0.00 km^{2})
- Elevation: 26 ft (7.9 m)

Population (2020)
  - Total: 15,929
  - Density: 1,279/sq mi (493.9/km^{2})
- Time zone: UTC-6 (CST)
  - Summer (DST): UTC-5 (CDT)
- ZIP code: 70592
- Area code: 337
- FIPS code: 22-83335
- Website: www.youngsville.us

Youngsville is a city in Lafayette Parish, Louisiana, United States, and is part of the Lafayette metropolitan statistical area. The population was 8,105 at the 2010 U.S. census, and 15,929 at the 2020 United States census.

Youngsville was the birthplace of Louisiana businessman and politician Dudley J. LeBlanc, the entrepreneur of the Hadacol fortune of the 1950s.

== History ==
Youngsville was settled in the early 19th century by French Acadian farmers. Prior to 1839, George Roy and his son, Desire, laid out the area and named the community "Royville". The settlement had grown large enough by 1859 to establish one of the oldest Catholic churches in Lafayette Parish: St. Anne Church, on the community's oldest street, Church Street. In 1908, the U.S. Postal Service asked village leaders to change the name because the town was being confused with the north Louisiana town of Rayville. So in 1908, the village of Youngsville was incorporated, with the name meaning "young village". It chose a government of a mayor and three aldermen.

On January 20, 1983, Louisiana Governor David C. Treen declared Youngsville a town. The town increased its governing body to a mayor and five aldermen to accommodate its population.

Youngsville was the fastest growing town in Louisiana from 1990 to 2005. Its population has increased by over 300 percent. According to the 2010 U.S. census, Youngsville grew at a rate of 103% between year 2000 and 2010. Youngsville was declared a city by Governor Kathleen Blanco in 2006.

Although the city has extended its boundaries and expanded its services, Youngsville has remained a rural city surrounded by sugarcane farms.

Youngsville is home of the Youngsville Sports Complex, Youngsville Recreation Center, Sugar Beach, Pixus Splash Park and the Youngsville Amphitheater. These facilities host over 1.2 million sports players and visitors every year.

== Geography ==
Youngsville is located in southeastern Lafayette Parish at 30°6′2″N 91°59′27″W (30.100595, -91.990707). It is bordered to the north by Lafayette, the parish seat, and to the east by the city of Broussard.

The center of Lafayette is 10 miles (16 km) to the north, Abbeville is 16 miles (26 km) to the southwest, and New Iberia is 16 miles to the southeast. According to the United States Census Bureau, Youngsville has a total land area of 12.07 square miles (31.26 km^{2}), all of it recorded as land.

== Demographics ==
Historical population
Census	Pop.	Note	%±
1900	200		—
1910	328		64.0%
1920	361		10.1%
1930	536		48.5%
1940	647		20.7%
1950	769		18.9%
1960	946		23.0%
1970	1,002		5.9%
1980	1,053		5.1%
1990	1,195		13.5%
2000	3,992		234.1%
2010	8,105		103.0%
2020	15,929		96.5%
2025 (est.)	19,980	▲	25.4%
U.S. Decennial Census

=== 2020 census ===
As of the 2020 census, Youngsville had a population of 15,929. The median age was 33.6 years. 31.3% of residents were under the age of 18 and 8.0% were 65 years of age or older. For every 100 females, there were 97.5 males, and for every 100 females age 18 and over, there were 91.9 males age 18 and over.

97.6% of residents lived in urban areas, while 2.4% lived in rural areas.

There were 5,577 households in Youngsville, of which 48.2% had children under the age of 18 living in them. Of all households, 58.9% were married-couple households, 13.4% had a male householder with no spouse or partner present, and 20.6% had a female householder with no spouse or partner present. About 19.3% of all households were made up of individuals, and 5.3% had someone living alone who was 65 years of age or older.

There were 5,871 housing units, of which 5.0% were vacant. The homeowner vacancy rate was 1.8%, and the rental vacancy rate was 9.7%.

Youngsville racial composition as of 2020
Race	Number	Percentage
White (non-Hispanic)	12,496	78.45%
Black or African American (non-Hispanic)	1,446	9.08%
Native American	49	0.31%
Asian	350	2.2%
Pacific Islander	6	0.04%
Other/Mixed	573	3.6%
Hispanic or Latino	1,009	6.33%

=== 2023 estimate ===
As of July 1, 2023, the U.S. Census Bureau estimated that 18,002 people lived in Youngsville.

=== 2019 American Community Survey ===
In 2019, 11.2% of residents lived at or below the poverty line, and the median household income was $89,038.

== Education ==
=== Public schools ===
Youngsville is part of the Lafayette Parish School System.

The public elementary schools in Youngsville are Green T. Lindon Elementary School and Ernest Gallet Elementary School. The Youngsville Middle School hosts students in sixth through eighth grades and is located in downtown Youngsville. All public school students from Youngsville attend Southside High School in Youngsville or attend Ovey Comeaux High School in southern Lafayette. Youngsville also has a charter school named Acadiana Renaissance Charter Academy.

=== Private schools ===
Private schools in the city include Westminster Christian Academy, located on the outskirts of Youngsville, and Youngsville Christian School, offering Kindergarten thru 12th grade in downtown Youngsville. Ascension Episcopal School, a private high school, is located near the Youngsville Sports Complex on Chemin Metaire Parkway across from Sugar Mill Pond.

== Roadways ==
The city of Youngsville began construction of the Chemin Metairie Parkway Project in the spring of 2007 to improve the roads in and around Youngsville. The first segment, from the intersection of Highway 92 and Chemin Metairie, to central Youngsville, opened in early 2009. Originally called the Youngsville Parkway, the road was renamed to avoid confusion with the existing Youngsville Highway also known as Highway 89. Chemin Metairie Parkway joins Highway 90 near the Baker Hughes Complex in Broussard.
