= Tre Harris =

American football player (born 2002)

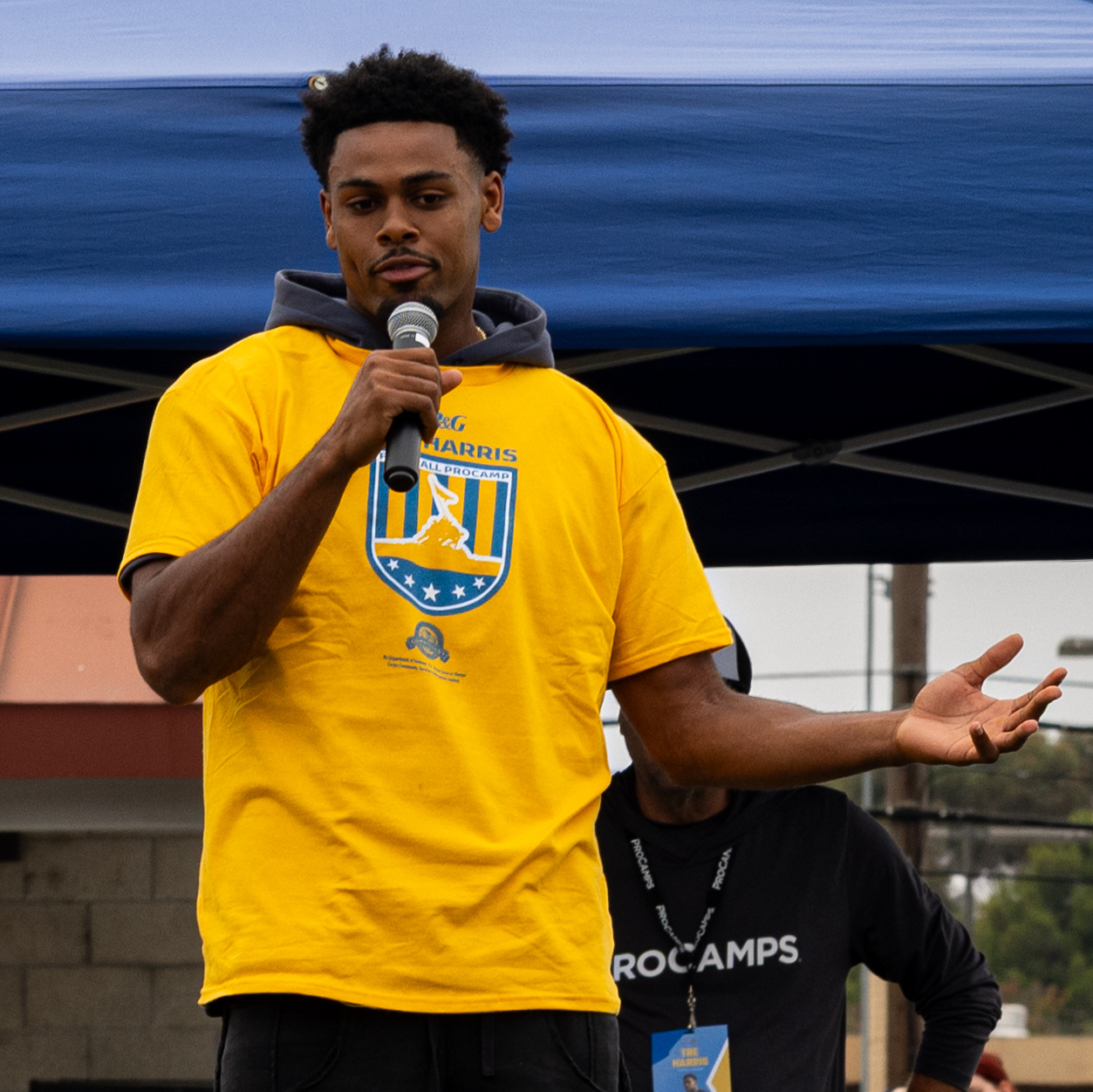
- Harris in 2025

No. 9 – Los Angeles Chargers
- Position: Wide receiver
- Roster status: Active

Personal information
- Born: February 28, 2002 (age 24)
- Listed height: 6 ft 3 in (1.91 m)
- Listed weight: 210 lb (95 kg)

Career information
- High school: Ovey Comeaux (Lafayette, Louisiana)
- College: Louisiana Tech (2020–2022); Ole Miss (2023–2024)
- NFL draft: 2025: 2nd round, 55th overall pick

Career history
- Los Angeles Chargers (2025–present)

Awards and highlights
- First-team All-SEC (2024); First-team All-C-USA (2022)

Career NFL statistics as of Week 3, 2026
- Rushing yards: 10
- Rushing average: 5
- Receptions: 40
- Receiving yards: 473
- Receiving touchdowns: 1
- Stats at Pro Football Reference

Cleveland Joseph "Tre" Harris III (born February 28, 2002) is an American professional football wide receiver for the Los Angeles Chargers of the National Football League (NFL). He played college football for the Louisiana Tech Bulldogs and Ole Miss Rebels. He was selected by the Chargers in the second round of the 2025 NFL draft.

== Early life ==
Harris was born on February 28, 2002, in Lafayette, Louisiana. He attended Ovey Comeaux High School and played both football and basketball. He played quarterback at Ovey Comeaux, throwing to teammate Malik Nabers but committed to play college football as a wide receiver for the Louisiana Tech Bulldogs. Harris was ranked a two-star prospect and the 99th-best player in the state by 247Sports.

== College career ==
=== Louisiana Tech ===
As a true freshman at Louisiana Tech University in 2020, Harris appeared in seven games and had one reception for 20 yards. He played 12 games, nine as a starter, in 2021, being the team's second-leading receiver with 40 catches for 562 yards and four touchdowns. The following season, he caught 65 receptions for 935 yards with 10 scores, being named first-team All-Conference USA. He entered the NCAA transfer portal after three years at Louisiana Tech, finishing with 31 games played, 21 as a starter, and 1,529 receiving yards with 14 touchdowns.

=== Ole Miss ===
Harris ultimately transferred to play for the Ole Miss Rebels. In his Ole Miss debut, against Mercer, he had 133 receiving yards and four touchdowns, setting the Ole Miss single-game receiving touchdowns record. Through the first four weeks of the season, he was named a top-three transfer player nationally by Pro Football Focus (PFF). Against 12th-ranked LSU, he had 153 receiving yards and the game-winning touchdown to win 55–49.

== Professional career ==
Pre-draft measurables
Height	Weight	Arm length	Hand span	Wingspan	40-yard dash	10-yard split	20-yard split	Vertical jump	Broad jump
6 ft 2 3/8 in (1.89 m)	205 lb (93 kg)	31 7/8 in (0.81 m)	9 5/8 in (0.24 m)	6 ft 6 1/4 in (1.99 m)	4.54 s	1.56 s	2.65 s	38.5 in (0.98 m)	10 ft 5 in (3.18 m)
All values from NFL Combine

Harris was selected by the Los Angeles Chargers with the 55th pick of the 2025 NFL draft in the second round. After not reaching a contract agreement with Chargers, Harris was officially listed as a holdout when he did not report to the first day of training camp on July 13, 2025. He then signed his rookie contract on July 17.
