= Josh Booty =

American baseball and football player (born 1975)

- Born: April 29, 1975 (age 51); Starkville, Mississippi, U.S.
- Baseball career
- Third baseman
- Batted: Right Threw: Right

MLB debut
- September 24, 1996, for the Florida Marlins

Last MLB appearance
- April 11, 1998, for the Florida Marlins

MLB statistics
- Batting average: .269
- Hits: 7
- RBIs: 4
- Home runs: 0
- Stats at Baseball Reference

Teams
- Florida Marlins (1996–1998)
- Football career

No. 12, 14
- Position: Quarterback

Personal information
- Listed height: 6 ft 2 in (1.88 m)
- Listed weight: 221 lb (100 kg)

Career information
- High school: Evangel Christian Academy (Shreveport, Louisiana)
- College: LSU
- NFL draft: 2001: 6th round, 172nd overall pick

Career history
- Seattle Seahawks (2001)*; Cleveland Browns (2001–2003); Oakland Raiders (2007)*
- * Offseason or practice squad member only

Joshua Gibson Booty (born April 29, 1975) is an American former professional baseball and football player. Booty played briefly in Major League Baseball (MLB) as a third baseman, and also in the National Football League (NFL) as a quarterback. He played college football for the LSU Tigers.

== High school (1990–1994) ==
Booty went to Evangel Christian Academy in Shreveport, Louisiana. Josh's father Johnny was an All-American high school football player as well at Shreveport's Woodlawn High School (which produced NFL quarterbacks Terry Bradshaw and Joe Ferguson in the 1960s), and was the athletic director at Evangel Christian. He was also one of the founders of the Evangel school that turned into a football factory. Booty was named to the All-Time National High School All-American team by Dick Butkus. Joe Namath, and John Elway were the other two quarterbacks mentioned on the All-Time team.

As quarterback for the football team, he threw for 11,700 yards and 126 touchdowns, becoming the first high school player in history to throw for more than 10,000 yards (despite missing the last four games of his senior year because of a broken hand). Booty was named the USA Today Offensive Player of the Year and was named the National High School Player of the Year by at least six associations, including Parade and the Football News.

Evangel won the Louisiana High School Athletic Association Class 1A state championship in 1993, the first of 11 the Eagles would win between 1993 and 2006.

Booty's main competition for the 1993 awards was Peyton Manning, who was then a senior at Isidore Newman School in New Orleans.

As a shortstop for the baseball team, he was a four-time All-State choice at shortstop. As a senior, he batted .429 with 20 intentional walks, 25 stolen bases, and 12 home runs in 70 at bats. He was the starting shortstop for the U.S. Junior Olympic National Team that won the silver medal. He was a USA Today All-American shortstop. Booty won a silver medal in the 1993 U.S. Olympic Festival. He was the 5th pick overall in the 1994 Major League Baseball draft by the Florida Marlins.

Highly recruited by major college football programs from across the country, Booty decided to sign with the Marlins for a then-record $1.6 million signing bonus.

== Baseball career (1994–1998) ==
Booty was the fifth pick in the first round of the Major League Baseball Amateur Draft (1994). He spent five years in the Marlins organization, hitting a career .269 in the majors. The team reportedly paid him $1.6 million, then a signing bonus record, if he abstained from football in the duration of his contract, but he pursued a career in pro football anyway. He hit 20-plus home runs in single and double A minor league stops and was voted the Minor League Defensive Player of the Year in 1997 for the Portland Sea Dogs. He hit .198 in his minor league career.

In 2013, Booty spent spring training in Arizona with the Arizona Diamondbacks as a knuckleball pitcher after winning MLB Network's reality show The Next Knuckler.

== College football career (1999–2000) ==
In 1999, Booty went to Louisiana State University (LSU) to play football for LSU's football team. He signed with LSU in February 1994 to play football for then-coach Curley Hallman, but instead signed a baseball contract.

During two years there, he completed 49.3% of his passes for 3,951 yards and 24 touchdowns.

=== Freshman season ===
Booty beat out two future NFL draft picks, Craig Nall and Rohan Davey, for the starting job. The Tigers had little success, leading to the firing of head coach Gerry DiNardo during the season.

=== Sophomore season ===
During his sophomore season (2000) under head coach Nick Saban, Booty started the first four games of the season.

In LSU's 58–0 victory over Western Carolina, he completed 80% of his passes for 291 yards with two touchdowns and no interceptions. In a 28–13 win over Houston, he completed 44% of his passes for 175 yards with two touchdowns and two interceptions. In a 34–17 loss to No. 24 Auburn, he completed 44.8% of his passes for 214 yards with two touchdowns and one interception. In a 13–10 loss to UAB, he completed 39.5% of his passes for 156 yards and an interception along the left sideline on what was the Tigers' final offensive play of the game, giving the ball to the Blazers in field goal range. UAB won on a 32-yard field goal by Rhett Gallego with no time left.

Booty sat out the next game against No. 11 Tennessee because of a rib injury. Rohan Davey quarterbacked a 38–31 overtime victory in that game in Tiger Stadium. Davey only completed 33.3% of his passes against Florida with no touchdowns and one interception, so Booty took over with 10:32 left in the third quarter while LSU was behind, 24–3. Booty completed 62.5% of his passes for 184 yards with one touchdown in the eventual 41–9 loss.

Booty started at quarterback for LSU for the rest of the season:

- 34–0 victory over Kentucky (completing 45.5% of his passes for 225 yards with three touchdowns and no interceptions)
- 45–38 OT victory over #13 Mississippi State (completing 63.2% of his passes for 246 yards with two touchdowns and one interception)
- 30–28 victory over Alabama (completing 58.1% of his passes for 275 yards with four touchdowns and no interceptions) This win was called the "It's About Time" game because LSU at home beat Alabama for the first time in 31 years.
- 20–9 victory over Ole Miss (completing 53.3% of his passes for 290 yards with one touchdown and no interceptions)
- 14-3 loss to Arkansas (completing 22.2% of his passes for 65 yards with no touchdowns and two interceptions) in pouring rain and windy conditions

During Booty's nine games as a starter, LSU went 6–3 as he threw 17 touchdowns and 14 interceptions. He finished his sophomore season with 2,121 passing yards, which at the time was the third-best performance by a sophomore in school history behind Jeff Wickersham in 1983 (2,542 yards) and Tommy Hodson in 1987 (2,125 yards).

At the end of the 2000 season, LSU won the Peach Bowl, 28–14, over No. 15 Georgia Tech. Booty played the first half and completed 42.1% of his passes with no touchdowns or interceptions. Trailing 14–3 at halftime, Saban yanked Booty and inserted Davey, who helped the Tigers outscore the Yellow Jackets 25–0 in the second half.

== Professional football career ==
Pre-draft measurables
Height	Weight	Arm length	Hand span	40-yard dash	10-yard split	20-yard split	20-yard shuttle	Three-cone drill	Vertical jump	Broad jump	Wonderlic
6 ft 2 1/2 in (1.89 m)	221 lb (100 kg)	32 in (0.81 m)	9 1/2 in (0.24 m)	4.90 s	1.77 s	2.84 s	4.48 s	7.54 s	29.5 in (0.75 m)	8 ft 9 in (2.67 m)	27
All values from NFL Combine

Booty was taken as the 177th pick (6th round) of the 2001 NFL draft by the Seattle Seahawks.

Booty signed with the Cleveland Browns in 2001, but he was waived in 2003.

== Personal life ==
One of Booty's younger brothers, Abram, was a wide receiver at LSU (1997–1999), Valdosta State University (2000) and a Cleveland Browns wide receiver in 2001. Another brother, John David Booty, was the starting quarterback at USC in 2007, and was drafted by the Minnesota Vikings in 2008. John David quarterbacked USC's victories over Michigan and Illinois in the 2007 and 2008 Rose Bowls, respectively. Booty's nephew, General, played college football as a quarterback for the Oklahoma Sooners and Louisiana-Monroe Warhawks. His son, Parker Fulghum, is a wide receiver for Clemson.

He was formerly the spokesperson for TrueMRI in Beverly Hills, California, and has been involved with numerous radio and television commentating work in sports, including Sirius, Fox Sports, ESPN Radio.

Josh won the MLB Network reality show "The Next Knuckler", hosted by former Boston Red Sox players Tim Wakefield and Kevin Millar. The show also included football players Doug Flutie, John David Booty, David Greene, and Ryan Perrilloux. For winning, he got a chance to go to spring training with the Arizona Diamondbacks as a pitcher, even though his baseball rights technically still belonged to the Marlins. He struggled with his command while pitching in minor league spring training games and was released on March 28.
