= Rohan Davey =

Jamaican-born American football player (born 1978)

No. 14, 6
- Position: Quarterback

Personal information
- Born: April 14, 1978 (age 48); Clarendon, Jamaica
- Listed height: 6 ft 2 in (1.88 m)
- Listed weight: 245 lb (111 kg)

Career information
- High school: Hialeah-Miami Lakes (Hialeah, Florida, U.S.)
- College: LSU
- NFL draft: 2002: 4th round, 117th overall pick

Career history
- New England Patriots (2002–2004); → Berlin Thunder (2004); Arizona Cardinals (2005); New York Dragons (2007–2008); Cleveland Gladiators (2008); San Antonio Talons (2013)

Awards and highlights
- 2× Super Bowl champion (XXXVIII, XXXIX); World Bowl champion (XII); NFL Europe Player of the Year (2004); Second-team All-SEC (2001); Sugar Bowl MVP (2002)

Career NFL statistics
- Passing attempts: 19
- Passing completions: 8
- Completion percentage: 50.0%
- TD–INT: 0–0
- Passing yards: 88
- Passer rating: 56.5
- Stats at Pro Football Reference

Career AFL statistics
- Attempts: 730
- Completions: 420
- Passing yards: 5,138
- TD–INT: 91–36
- Passer rating: 89.97
- Stats at ArenaFan.com

Rohan St. Patrick Davey (born April 14, 1978) is a Jamaican-born former professional American football quarterback. He won two Super Bowl rings with the New England Patriots, as the backup to Tom Brady in 2003 and 2004.

== Early life ==
Davey attended Hialeah-Miami Lakes High School in Hialeah, Florida and was a letterman in football and basketball. During his junior and senior year as high school quarterback, he threw for 4,126 yards and 52 touchdowns. In basketball, he averaged 17.1 points per game as a senior. He graduated in 1997.

== College career ==
During his time playing for LSU, Davey threw for 4,415 yards and 29 touchdowns.

As a freshman (1998), Davey was a backup to Herb Tyler and Craig Nall, and saw no playing time.

As a sophomore (1999) and a junior (2000), Davey shared the QB position with Josh Booty. As a sophomore, Davey led unranked LSU to a 35–10 victory over #17 Arkansas (televised by CBS), passing for 224 yards and three touchdowns. As a junior Davey led unranked LSU to a 38–31 OT victory over #11 Tennessee (televised by ESPN), passing for 318 yards and 4 touchdowns.

As a senior (2001), Davey had the QB position to himself (Booty had gone to the National Football League); and he led LSU to its first Top 10 finish since 1987 and its first SEC Championship since 1988. During the regular season, Davey passed for 3,347 yards, becoming the first QB in LSU history to pass for over 3,000 yards in a season. Davey also beat Peyton Manning's junior-year performance at Tennessee in 1996 (Manning threw for 3,287 yards that year), which was 9th best in SEC history. With 3,351 yards of total offense (3,347 yards passing, 4 yards rushing) on 405 plays, Davey had an average of 8.27 yards of total offense per play, making him the 5th person in SEC history to finish a season with more than 8.0 yards of total offense per play (minimum 300 plays).

Davey's best performance during the regular season was at Alabama (televised by CBS), when he passed for 528 yards (becoming the first LSU quarterback to throw for more than 500 yards in a game). By passing for 528 yards against Alabama, Davey also became #3 in SEC history for most passing yards in a game (beating Peyton Manning's 523 passing yards against Kentucky in 1997).

Davey's major victories included unranked LSU's 41–38 victory over #24 Arkansas (televised by CBS) and #22 LSU's 27–14 victory over #25 Auburn (televised by ESPN). Against Arkansas, Davey threw for 359 yards and 3 touchdowns. Against Auburn, Davey threw for 245 yards and 1 touchdown. In the SEC Championship game against #2 Tennessee, Davey had 84 yards passing before having to sit the rest of the game out due to injury.

Davey capped off his senior season by passing for 444 yards and 3 touchdowns in the Sugar Bowl against #7 Illinois (televised by ABC), leading the Tigers to a 47–34 victory. At that time, the only other LSU quarterback who had ever thrown for more than 400 yards in a game was Tommy Hodson in 1989. For his performance, Davey was named Sugar Bowl MVP. For this performance, Davey was enshrined in LSU's Hall of Fame.

As a result of his performance during the 2001 season, Davey was voted to the second team of the All-SEC Team.

== Professional career ==
Pre-draft measurables
Height	Weight	Arm length	Hand span
6 ft 2 in (1.88 m)	245 lb (111 kg)	33 in (0.84 m)	9 1/2 in (0.24 m)
All values from NFL Combine

Davey was rated the fourth best quarterback in the 2002 NFL draft by NFLDraftScout.com.

=== National Football League ===
Davey was selected by the New England Patriots coming off a record-setting career at LSU, taken in the fourth round as the 117th pick of the 2002 NFL draft (Davey was the 6th quarterback taken in the 2002 NFL Draft, behind David Carr of Fresno State, Joey Harrington of Oregon, Patrick Ramsey of Tulane, Josh McCown of Sam Houston, and David Garrard of East Carolina).

While still with the Patriots, Davey showed potential in 2004 playing in NFL Europe. He had a record-setting season, was named "Player of the Year", and won the World Bowl with the Berlin Thunder.

Upon returning to the Patriots, he lost his back-up job to Doug Flutie and lost the third-string slot, losing that job to 7th-round pick Matt Cassel. He was subsequently released by the Patriots on August 29, 2005.

On September 28, 2005, Davey signed with the Arizona Cardinals as the quarterback behind Kurt Warner, Josh McCown, and John Navarre. On August 28, 2006, he was released.

=== Arena Football League ===
Davey was signed by the Arena Football League's New York Dragons on October 26, 2006. He played in his first career game on March 4, 2007, replacing an ineffective Leon Murray at the start of the second half. He finished the game having completed 12-of-21 passes for 131 yards, one touchdown and two interceptions. Following this game, he was named the Dragons' starting quarterback. Davey was waived in 2008, and signed a contract with the Cleveland Gladiators on April 3 of that year. He was released when the league went bankrupt. After sitting out for five seasons, Davey returned in 2013 as a member of the San Antonio Talons.

== Personal life ==
Davey is the cousin of football player Trevon Coley.

In April 2023, Davey was named the new head football coach at Ascension Christian High School in Gonzales, Louisiana. He resigned from the position in February 2025.

== See also ==
- LSU Tigers football statistical leaders
