= Malik Nabers =

American football player (born 2003)

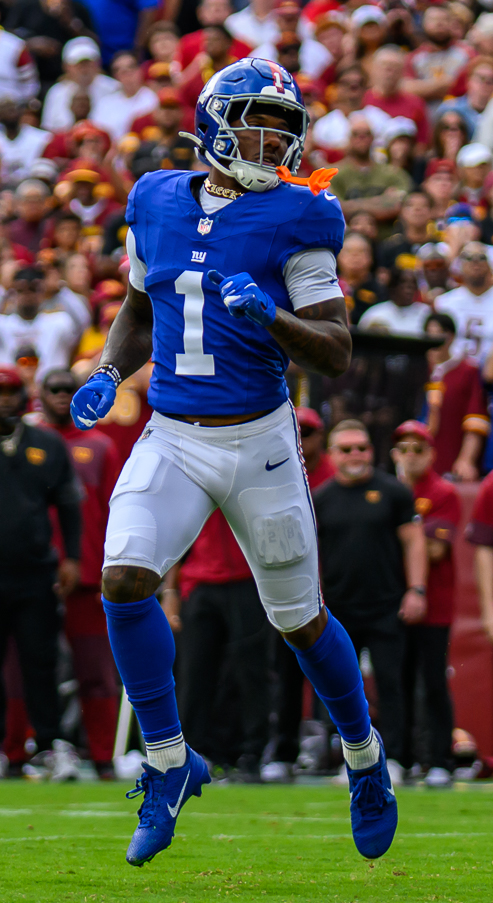
- Nabers with the New York Giants in 2025

No. 1 – New York Giants
- Position: Wide receiver
- Roster status: Active

Personal information
- Born: July 28, 2003 (age 23); Lafayette, Louisiana, U.S.
- Listed height: 6 ft 0 in (1.83 m)
- Listed weight: 200 lb (91 kg)

Career information
- High school: Southside (Youngsville, Louisiana)
- College: LSU (2021–2023)
- NFL draft: 2024: 1st round, 6th overall pick

Career history
- New York Giants (2024–present)

Awards and highlights
- Pro Bowl (2024); PFWA All-Rookie Team (2024); Unanimous All-American (2023); First-team All-SEC (2023); NFL records: Most games with 5 or more receptions by a rookie: 14 games; Youngest WR with multiple touchdowns in a game: 21 years and 56 days; Most targets by a rookie in a season

Career NFL statistics as of Week 10, 2026
- Receptions: 185
- Receiving yards: 2,167
- Receiving touchdowns: 11
- Stats at Pro Football Reference

Malik Nabers (born July 28, 2003) is an American professional football wide receiver for the New York Giants of the National Football League (NFL). He played college football for the LSU Tigers, finishing as their all-time leader in receiving yards and earning unanimous All-American honors in 2023. Nabers was selected sixth overall by the Giants in the 2024 NFL draft, and set numerous rookie wide receiver and franchise records.

== Early life ==
Nabers was born on July 28, 2003, in Lafayette, Louisiana. He attended Ovey Comeaux High School before transferring to Southside High School in Youngsville, Louisiana, for his senior year. He was unable to play football his senior year due to his transfer waiver being denied. In his final season of playing high school football, he led the state of Louisiana with 58 receptions for 1,223 yards and 21 touchdowns. Nabers originally committed to Mississippi State University to play college football before switching to Louisiana State University (LSU).

== College career ==
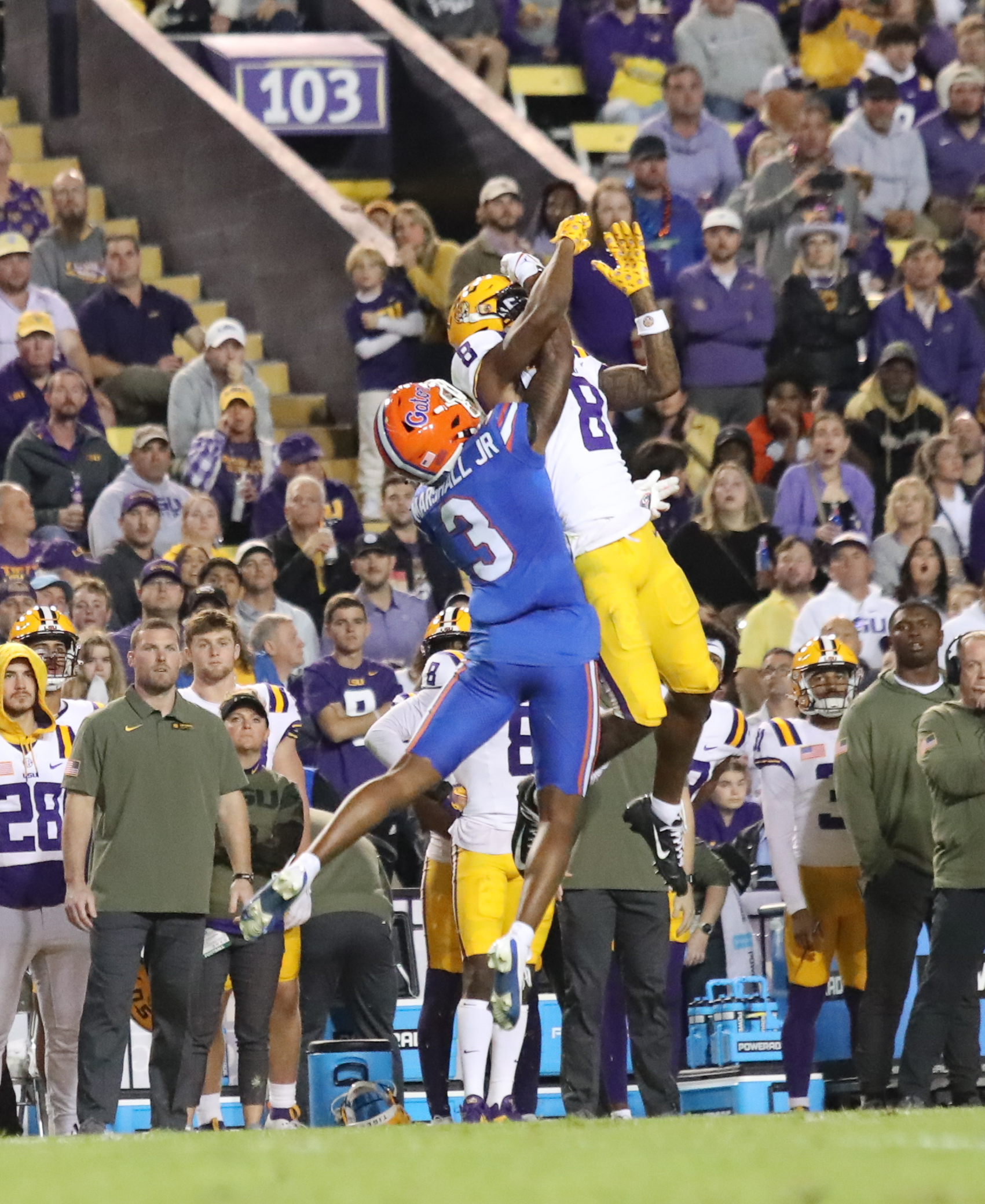
Nabers going up for a catch against Jason Marshall Jr. of the Florida Gators, 2023

As a true freshman at LSU in 2021, Nabers played in 11 games with six starts and had 28 receptions for 417 yards and four touchdowns. He returned to LSU as a starter in 2022; Nabers was named MVP of the 2023 Citrus Bowl with nine catches for 163 yards and a touchdown pass thrown to quarterback Jayden Daniels. On September 16, 2023, he had 13 receptions for 239 yards and two touchdowns in a win over Mississippi State. For the 2023 season, he was named a unanimous All-American after leading the FBS in receiving yards with 1,569. Nabers declared for the 2024 NFL draft following the season, finishing as LSU's all-time leader in receiving yards with 3,003.

== Professional career ==
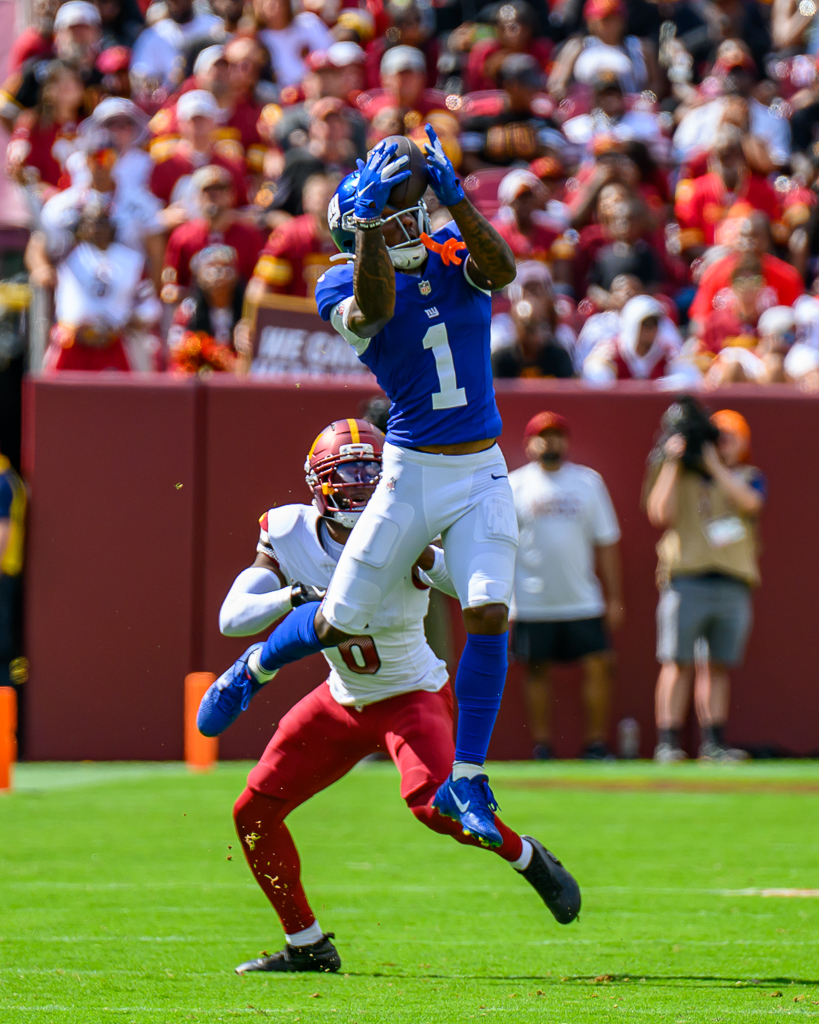
Nabers with the New York Giants catching a pass against the Washington Commanders, 2025

Pre-draft measurables
Height	Weight	Arm length	Hand span	Wingspan	40-yard dash	10-yard split	20-yard split	Vertical jump	Broad jump	Bench press
5 ft 11 3/4 in (1.82 m)	200 lb (91 kg)	31 3/8 in (0.80 m)	9 7/8 in (0.25 m)	6 ft 4 1/8 in (1.93 m)	4.35 s	1.56 s	2.54 s	42.0 in (1.07 m)	10 ft 9 in (3.28 m)	15 reps
All values from NFL Combine/Pro Day

Nabers was selected by the New York Giants sixth overall in the 2024 NFL draft. In the offseason, Nabers and former LSU teammate Jayden Daniels received guidance from the league on its gambling policy for proposing a friendly $10,000 bet on which of the two would earn Offensive Rookie of the Year honors. He signed his four-year rookie contract, worth $29.9 million fully guaranteed, on May 10, 2024. Nabers switched to the uniform number 1 after initially wearing 9 during the preseason, becoming the first Giant to wear it since 1935 when it was retired for Ray Flaherty.

=== 2024 ===
In his NFL debut, Nabers had five receptions for 66 yards in a 28–6 loss to the Minnesota Vikings. He caught his first NFL touchdown pass in week 2 against the Washington Commanders. In week 3, he had 78 receiving yards and two touchdowns in a 21–15 win over the Cleveland Browns. He became the first player in NFL history to put up at least 20 receptions and three touchdown catches in his first three career games. He also became the youngest wide receiver in NFL history to record at least two touchdown receptions in a game at 21 years and 56 days old, surpassing the previous record set by Mike Evans at 21 years and 73 days old. In week 16, he had 7 receptions for 68 yards, breaking Odell Beckham Jr.'s previously held record of 91 receptions as a rookie. On December 29, 2024, during the week 17 game against the Indianapolis Colts, Nabers and Tyrone Tracy became the 3rd rookie duo in NFL history to each record 1,000 yards from scrimmage. Nabers ended the game with 7 receptions, 171 yards and two touchdowns in a 45–33 win over the Colts. In week 18, Nabers broke the Giants' franchise record for most single-season receptions, previously held by Steve Smith with 107 in 2009. Nabers ended his rookie season with 1,204 receiving yards and seven touchdowns on 109 receptions, in 15 games. He was named to the PFWA All-Rookie Team and earned Pro Bowl honors. He was ranked 67th by his fellow players on the NFL Top 100 Players of 2025.

=== 2025 ===
On September 14, 2025, Nabers caught 9 receptions for 167 yards and 2 touchdowns in a 40–37 overtime loss to the Dallas Cowboys in Week 2. Among those receptions, he caught a 48-yard touchdown pass from Russell Wilson with 25 seconds left to give the Giants the lead, 37–34. On September 28, during a home game at MetLife Stadium, which the Giants won 21–18 against the Los Angeles Chargers, Nabers landed awkwardly on his right knee while attempting to catch a deep pass from quarterback Jaxson Dart. An MRI later confirmed that he suffered a torn right ACL, officially ending his sophomore season.

=== 2026 ===
For his 12-catch, 165-yard performance against the New Orleans Saints in Week 6, Nabers was named as one of the FedEx Air & Ground NFL Players of the Week. The 168 receptions in his first 25 career games is second-most in NFL history, behind the 176 by Odell Beckham Jr. Nabers was named NFC Offensive Player of the Month for October after recording 36 receptions for 509 yards and two touchdown catches, for an average of 127.3 yards per game.

== Career statistics ==
Legend
**Bold**	Career high

=== NFL ===
Year	Team	Games		Receiving							Rushing					Fumbles	
Year	Team	GP	GS	Tgt	Rec	Yds	Avg	Y/G	Lng	TD	Att	Yds	Avg	Lng	TD	Fum	Lost
2024	NYG	15	13	**170**	**109**	**1,204**	11.0	80.3	**59**	**7**	**5**	**2**	**0.4**	**4**	0	**1**	0
2025	NYG	4	4	35	18	271	**15.1**	67.8	48	2	0	0	0	0	0	0	0
2026	NYG	9	9	85	58	692	11.9	**76.9**	46	2	0	0	0	0	0	2	0
Career		28	26	290	185	2,167	11.7	77.4	59	11	5	2	0.4	4	0	3	0

=== College ===
College statistics
Season	Team	Games		Receiving			
Season	Team	GP	GS	Rec	Yards	Avg	TD
2021	LSU	11	6	28	417	14.9	4
2022	LSU	14	12	72	1,017	14.1	3
2023	LSU	13	13	**89**	**1,569**	**17.6**	**14**
Career		38	31	189	3,003	15.9	21

== Career highlights ==
=== Awards and honors ===
NFL

- Pro Bowl (2024)
- PFWA All-Rookie Team (2024)
- Ranked No. 67 in the Top 100 Players of 2025
- NFC Offensive Player of the Month (2026: October)
- FedEx Air & Ground NFL Players of the Week (2026: Week 6)

College

- Unanimous All-American (2023)
- First-team All-SEC (2023)

=== Records ===
==== NFL records ====
- Most games with 5 or more receptions as a rookie: 14 games
- Youngest WR with multiple touchdowns in a game : 21 years and 56 days
- Fastest to reach 100 career receptions : 14 games (tied with Odell Beckham Jr.)
- Most targets by a rookie in a season : 170

==== New York Giants franchise records ====
- Most receptions in a season : 109
- Youngest player to score a touchdown in a game : 21 years and 49 days
- Most receptions in a rookie season : 109
- Most receptions in a game by a rookie wide receiver: 12 (tied with Odell Beckham Jr.)

== Personal life ==
Nabers' uncle, Gabe Nabers, played 26 games as a running back for the Los Angeles Chargers from 2020 to 2021. His first cousin, Jordan Allen, plays for the Houston Cougars college football team.
