= Josh Reed =

American football player (born 1980)

No. 82
- Position: Wide receiver

Personal information
- Born: May 1, 1980 (age 46); Rayne, Louisiana, U.S.
- Listed height: 5 ft 10 in (1.78 m)
- Listed weight: 210 lb (95 kg)

Career information
- High school: Rayne (LA)
- College: LSU
- NFL draft: 2002: 2nd round, 36th overall pick

Career history
- Buffalo Bills (2002–2009); San Diego Chargers (2010)*
- * Offseason or practice squad member only

Awards and highlights
- Biletnikoff Award (2001); Consensus All-American (2001); 2× First-team All-SEC (2000, 2001)

Career NFL statistics
- Receptions: 311
- Receiving yards: 3,575
- Receiving touchdowns: 10
- Stats at Pro Football Reference

Joshua Blake Reed (born May 1, 1980) is an American former professional football player who was a wide receiver for eight seasons with the Buffalo Bills of the National Football League (NFL) during the 2000s. He played college football for the LSU Tigers, earning consensus All-American honors and recognition as the nation's best college receiver. He was selected by Buffalo in the second round of the 2002 NFL draft.

== Early life ==
Reed was born in Rayne, Louisiana. He attended Rayne High School, and played high school football for the Rayne Mighty Wolves.

== College career ==
Reed attended Louisiana State University, and played for coach Gerry DiNardo and coach Nick Saban's LSU Tigers football team from 1998 to 2001. While at LSU, he was one of the most productive receivers in college football. In only two years as a wide receiver (his freshman year he played running back for most of the season and he declared for the NFL draft after his junior season) he rewrote the SEC record books. He holds the SEC record for receiving yardage in a game (293 vs. Alabama in 2001) and season (1,740 in 2001). He also held the career receiving yardage record with 3,001 yards until 2002 when the record was broken by Georgia receiver Terrence Edwards. Reed also holds the SEC season record for receiving yardage per game (145.0 in 2001) and is second in career receiving yardage per game (96.8). He was a first-team All-Southeastern Conference (SEC) selection in 2000 and 2001, and a consensus All-American in 2001. He was awarded the Biletnikoff Award as the season's outstanding college football receiver in 2001.

== Professional career ==
=== Buffalo Bills ===
Reed was selected by the Buffalo Bills in the second round (36th overall) of the 2002 NFL draft. In 2003, Reed replaced Peerless Price as the Bills' starting wide receiver. He caught 58 passes and two touchdowns. Reed was hospitalized for two days in November 2006 after bruising his kidney.

Reed caught 311 passes for 3,575 yards and 10 touchdowns with the Bills. He became an unrestricted free agent following the 2009 season.

=== San Diego Chargers ===
Reed was signed by the San Diego Chargers to a one-year contract on June 11, 2010. He was released by the Chargers on September 4, 2010.

=== NFL statistics ===
Receiving statistics

Year	Team	Games	Receptions	Targets	Yards	Yards per rec.	Long	TDs	First downs	Fumbles	Fumbles lost
2002	BUF	16	37	-	509	13.8	42	2	23	1	1
2003	BUF	16	58	-	588	10.1	26	2	33	1	1
2004	BUF	12	16	-	153	9.6	20	0	8	0	0
2005	BUF	16	32	-	449	14.0	51	2	21	0	0
2006	BUF	13	34	48	410	12.1	52	2	21	0	0
2007	BUF	15	51	89	578	11.3	30	0	33	0	0
2008	BUF	13	56	79	597	10.7	24	1	36	0	0
2009	BUF	14	27	45	291	10.8	29	1	18	0	0
Career		115	311	261	3,575	11.5	52	10	193	2	2

== See also ==
- List of NCAA major college football yearly receiving leaders
- LSU Tigers football statistical leaders
