= Arden Key =

American football player (born 1996)

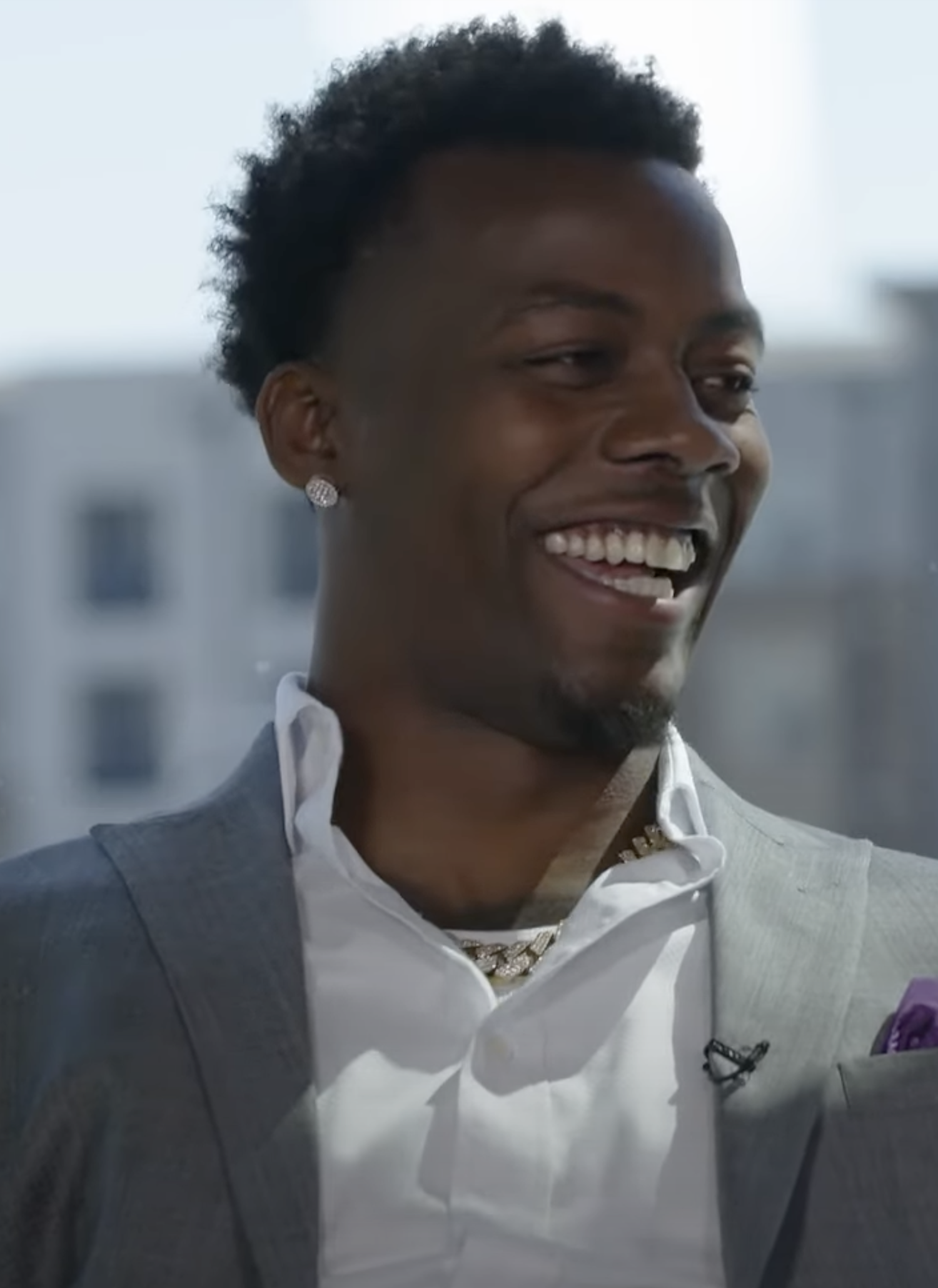
- Key in 2023

No. 98 – Indianapolis Colts
- Position: Linebacker
- Roster status: Active

Personal information
- Born: May 3, 1996 (age 30); Atlanta, Georgia, U.S.
- Listed height: 6 ft 5 in (1.96 m)
- Listed weight: 240 lb (109 kg)

Career information
- High school: Hapeville Charter Career Academy (Union City, Georgia)
- College: LSU (2015–2017)
- NFL draft: 2018: 3rd round, 87th overall pick

Career history
- Oakland / Las Vegas Raiders (2018–2020); San Francisco 49ers (2021); Jacksonville Jaguars (2022); Tennessee Titans (2023–2025); Indianapolis Colts (2026–present)

Awards and highlights
- 2× First-team All-SEC (2016, 2017)

Career NFL statistics as of 2025
- Total tackles: 192
- Sacks: 30.5
- Forced fumbles: 4
- Fumble recoveries: 2
- Pass deflections: 8
- Stats at Pro Football Reference

Arden Key Jr. (born May 3, 1996) is an American professional football linebacker for the Indianapolis Colts of the National Football League (NFL). He played college football for the LSU Tigers, and was selected by the Oakland Raiders in the third round of the 2018 NFL draft.

== Early life ==
Key attended Hapeville Charter Career Academy in Union City, Georgia. He recorded 15.5 sacks as a senior, eight as a junior and 12 as a sophomore. He committed to Louisiana State University (LSU) to play college football.

Regarded as a four-star recruit by ESPN, Key was ranked as the No. 6 defensive end prospect in the class of 2015.

== College career ==
As a true freshman at LSU in 2015, Key played in 12 games and started the final nine. He recorded 41 tackles and five sacks and was named a freshman All-American. As a sophomore in 2016, he set a single-season school record by recording 12 sacks. He earned first-team All-Southeastern Conference honors from the Associated Press. As a junior in 2017, Key was limited to 8 games due to injury, but finished with 33 tackles, 4 sacks, and a forced fumble. On January 4, 2018, Key officially announced that he would be entering the 2018 NFL draft.

== Professional career ==
=== Pre-draft ===
Pre-draft measurables
Height	Weight	Arm length	Hand span	Wingspan	40-yard dash	10-yard split	20-yard split	20-yard shuttle	Three-cone drill	Vertical jump	Broad jump	Wonderlic
6 ft 4 7/8 in (1.95 m)	238 lb (108 kg)	33 1/2 in (0.85 m)	10 in (0.25 m)	6 ft 10 1/8 in (2.09 m)	4.88 s	1.75 s	2.76 s	4.25 s	7.16 s	31.0 in (0.79 m)	9 ft 9 in (2.97 m)	18
All values from NFL Combine/Pro Day

Prior to Key's junior season, he was projected as the number one overall prospect for the 2018 NFL Draft by Chris Trapasso of CBS Sports. In January 2018, he was ranked as the number two draft prospect at the outside linebacker position, behind Tremaine Edmunds of Virginia Tech, by Mel Kiper of ESPN. Key was projected to be an early first round selection, but his off-the-field issues caused his draft stock to plummet.

=== Oakland / Las Vegas Raiders ===
Key was selected by the Oakland Raiders in the third round as the 87th pick overall. He played all 16 games during the 2018 season.

Key played seven games in the 2019 season. After having two sacks in his final two games, Key suffered a broken foot and was ruled out the rest of the season. He was placed on injured reserve on November 7, 2019.

Key played 14 games during the 2020 season, missing two games due to illness. He was placed on the reserve/COVID-19 list by the team on November 18, 2020, and activated three days later. On December 26, 2020, in a Week 16 home game against the Miami Dolphins, Key committed a 15-yard personal foul penalty when he grabbed the facemask of Dolphin QB Ryan Fitzpatrick on a play where the Dolphins gained 34 yards; the penalty and catch put Miami in field goal range and Miami hit one from 44 yards to earn a 26-25 win, which eliminated the Raiders from playoff contention.

Key was waived on April 15, 2021.

=== San Francisco 49ers ===
On April 23, 2021, Key signed a one-year contract with the San Francisco 49ers. He played all 17 games of the 2021 season.

=== Jacksonville Jaguars ===
On March 30, 2022, Key signed a one-year contract with the Jacksonville Jaguars. He played in all 17 games with three starts, recording 27 tackles and 4.5 sacks.

=== Tennessee Titans ===
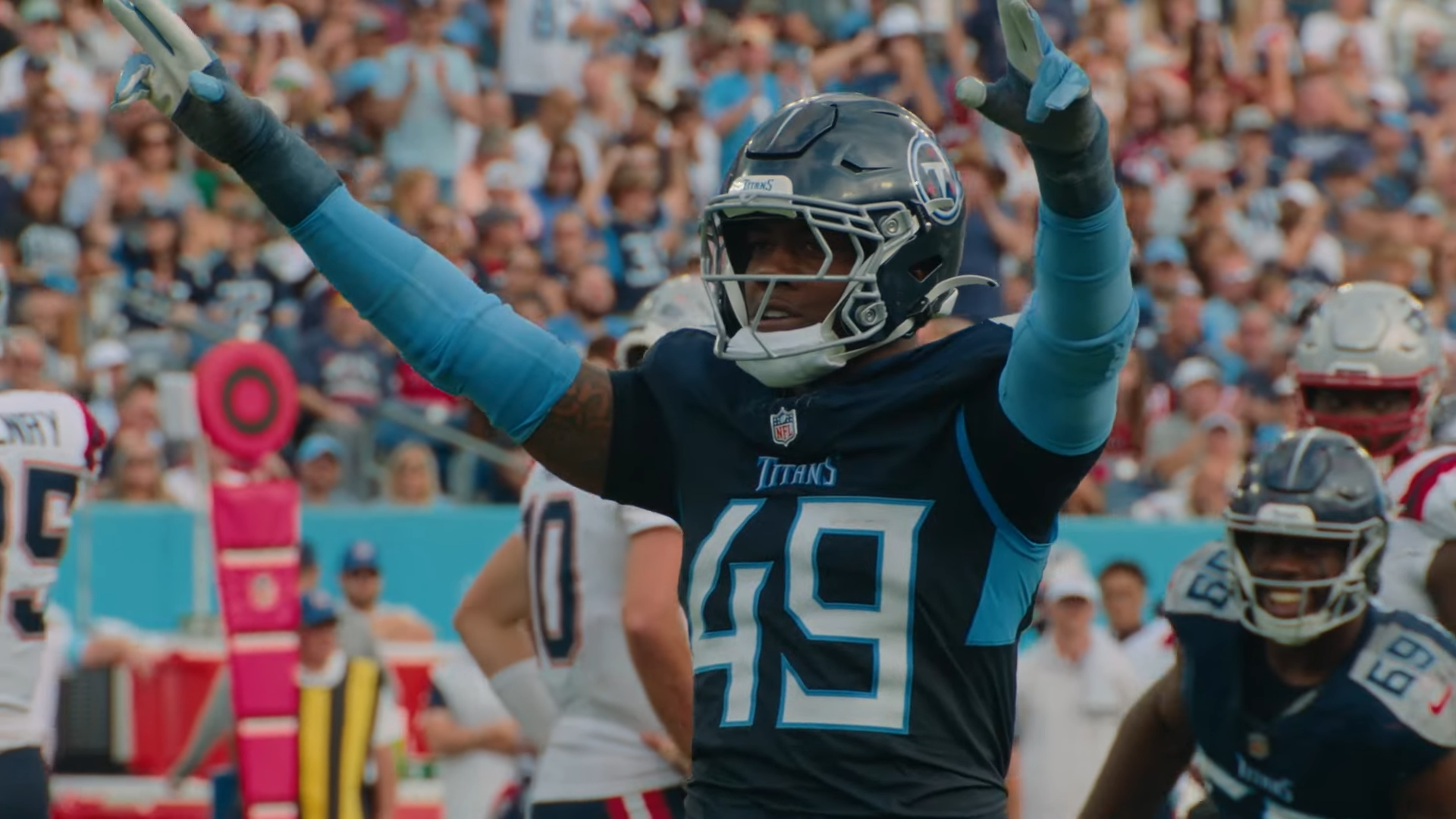
Key playing for the Titans in 2024.

On March 20, 2023, Key signed a three-year, $21 million contract with the Tennessee Titans. He played in 17 games with nine starts during the 2023 season, recording 30 tackles, six sacks, and two forced fumbles.

On July 30, 2024, Key was suspended 6 games for violating the NFL's policy against performance–enhancing drugs. However, Key successfully appealed the ban, and his suspension was overturned on August 17. He played 16 games during the 2024 season, only missing the last game due to injury. He finished with a career high of 42 tackles, 6.5 sacks, 18 pressures, and a pass deflection.

=== Indianapolis Colts ===
On March 12, 2026, Key signed with the Indianapolis Colts on a two-year, $20 million contract with $11 million guaranteed.

== NFL career statistics ==
Legend
**Bold**	Career high

=== Regular season ===
Year	Team	Games		Tackles					Interceptions			Fumbles	
Year	Team	GP	GS	Comb	Solo	Ast	TFL	Sck	PD	Int	Yds	FF	FR
2018	OAK	16	10	30	21	9	4	1.0	0	0	0	0	0
2019	OAK	7	0	4	3	1	2	2.0	0	0	0	0	0
2020	LV	14	0	15	10	5	2	0.0	**2**	0	0	0	0
2021	SF	17	0	22	11	11	5	**6.5**	1	0	0	0	0
2022	JAX	17	3	27	16	11	5	4.5	**2**	0	0	0	**1**
2023	TEN	17	9	30	17	13	4	6.0	**2**	0	0	**2**	0
2024	TEN	16	15	**42**	**24**	**18**	**11**	**6.5**	1	0	0	**2**	**1**
2025	TEN	12	9	22	9	13	6	4.0	0	0	0	0	0
Career		116	46	192	111	81	39	30.5	8	0	0	4	2

=== Postseason ===
Year	Team	Games		Tackles					Interceptions			Fumbles	
Year	Team	GP	GS	Comb	Solo	Ast	TFL	Sck	PD	Int	Yds	FF	FR
2021	SF	3	0	**2**	**1**	**1**	0	0.0	0	0	0	0	0
2022	JAX	2	0	**2**	**1**	**1**	0	0.0	**1**	0	0	0	0
Career		5	0	4	2	2	0	0.0	1	0	0	0	0

== See also ==
- LSU Tigers football statistical leaders
