= Matt Mauck =

American football player (born 1979)

No. 8
- Position: Quarterback

Personal information
- Born: February 12, 1979 (age 47); Jasper, Indiana, U.S.
- Listed height: 6 ft 2 in (1.88 m)
- Listed weight: 220 lb (100 kg)

Career information
- High school: Jasper
- College: LSU (2000–2003)
- NFL draft: 2004: 7th round, 225th overall pick

Career history
- Denver Broncos (2004); Tennessee Titans (2005–2006)

Awards and highlights
- BCS national champion (2003); Second-team All-SEC (2003)

Career NFL statistics
- Passing attempts: 27
- Passing completions: 15
- Completion percentage: 55.6%
- TD–INT: 0–1
- Passing yards: 136
- Passer rating: 53.9
- Stats at Pro Football Reference

Matthew Ryan Mauck (born February 12, 1979) is an American former professional football player who was a quarterback in the National Football League (NFL) for the Denver Broncos and Tennessee Titans. He played college football for the LSU Tigers, winning the national championship in 2003.

== Baseball career ==
Mauck was a star baseball and football player at Jasper High School in Jasper, Indiana, and, as a pitcher, center fielder and third baseman, helped lead the high school baseball team to state baseball championships in 1996 and 1997. He also led the football team to the state finals as a quarterback and defensive back in 1995. He originally committed to play quarterback for head coach Nick Saban at Michigan State out of high school in 1997. Ultimately, however, he chose to sign a Major League Baseball contract with the Chicago Cubs after he was selected in the sixth round of the 1997 MLB draft, instead of playing college football. He would play on the minor league level in the Cubs organization for three years, before returning to college to play football.

== College football career ==
Mauck accepted an offer to play football at LSU in 2000. LSU was coached at the time by Nick Saban, the same coach who recruited him to play football at Michigan State three years earlier. Saban had just accepted an offer to come to LSU, and was looking for depth at the quarterback position. Mauck was redshirted during the 2000 season, and saw limited action during 2001 regular season. His first significant action came during the 2001 SEC Championship Game, when he came off the bench to replace injured starting quarterback Rohan Davey. Mauck would run for two touchdowns, leading the underdog Tigers to a come-from-behind 31–20 victory over the heavily favored #2 Tennessee Volunteers.

=== 2002 season ===
In 2002, Mauck entered the regular season as the starting quarterback, beating out Marcus Randall and Rick Clausen. He led the Tigers to a 5–1 start, but was lost for the season with a broken foot during the sixth game. The Tigers slumped after the injury, finishing the season with an 8–5 record.

=== 2003 season ===
He returned as the starting quarterback for his junior season in 2003, and led LSU to its best season in 45 years. He set an LSU record, throwing 28 touchdowns during the season. LSU finished the regular season with an 11–1 record, and then beat Georgia 34–13 in the 2003 SEC Championship Game. The victory helped the Tigers earn a berth in the 2003 BCS Championship Game, the 2004 Sugar Bowl vs. Oklahoma. Mauck did not have a great game in the Sugar Bowl, throwing two interceptions and no touchdowns. However, the Tigers won the game 21–14, earning LSU the BCS National Championship.

== Professional football career ==
Pre-draft measurables
Height	Weight	Arm length	Hand span
6 ft 1 5/8 in (1.87 m)	228 lb (103 kg)	31 1/8 in (0.79 m)	8 3/4 in (0.22 m)
All values from NFL Combine

Mauck decided to go pro after the 2003 season, and he was selected in the 2004 NFL draft by the Denver Broncos with the 225th pick in the seventh round. He made the roster, but did not appear in any games in 2004. In 2005, he signed with the Tennessee Titans. He appeared in two games during the season, including one start in the final regular season game of the year, a loss to the Jacksonville Jaguars.

Mauck entered the 2006 NFL offseason on the Tennessee Titans roster, but was cut at the end of the preseason. He became expendable after the Titans drafted Vince Young and signed free agent quarterback Kerry Collins. However, he was signed back to the Titans' practice squad after week 2, after third-string quarterback Billy Volek was traded to the San Diego Chargers.

== Career statistics ==
=== NFL ===
==== Regular season ====
Year	Team	Games			Passing								Rushing				Sacks		Fumbles (Note: Fumbles lost data taken from Pro Football Reference career game log)	
Year	Team	GP	GS	Record	Cmp	Att	Pct	Yds	Y/A	TD	Int	Rtg	Att	Yds	Avg	TD	Sck	SckY	Fum	Lost
2004	DEN	0	0	DNP																
2005	TEN	2	1	0–1	15	27	55.6	136	5.0	0	1	53.9	7	39	5.6	0	1	8	1	1
Career		2	1	0–1	15	27	55.6	136	5.0	0	1	53.9	7	39	5.6	0	1	8	1	1

==== Playoffs ====
Year	Team	Games			Passing								Rushing				Sacks		Fumbles	
Year	Team	GP	GS	Record	Cmp	Att	Pct	Yds	Y/A	TD	Int	Rtg	Att	Yds	Avg	TD	Sck	SckY	Fum	Lost
2004	DEN	0	0	DNP																

=== College ===
Year	Team	Passing								Rushing			
Year	Team	Cmp	Att	Pct	Yds	Y/A	TD	Int	Rtg	Att	Yds	Avg	TD
2001	LSU	18	41	43.9	224	5.5	0	2	80.0	20	73	3.7	2
2002	LSU	63	130	48.5	782	6.0	9	2	118.8	50	175	3.5	2
2003	LSU	229	358	64.0	2,825	7.9	28	14	148.2	79	97	1.2	1
Career		310	529	58.6	3,831	7.2	37	18	135.7	149	345	2.3	5

== Personal life ==
Mauck is a 2011 graduate of the University of Colorado School of Dentistry, and currently works as a dentist in Aurora, Colorado.
