= Lafayette High School (Louisiana) =

Public high school in Lafayette, Louisiana, United States

Location
- 3000 West Congress Street; Lafayette, Louisiana; United States; 30°12′25″N 92°3′32″W

Information
- Type: Public high school
- Oversight: Lafayette Parish School System
- Principal: Layne Edelman
- Teaching staff: 102.92 (on an FTE basis)
- Grades: 9–12
- Enrollment: 1,862 (2023–2024)
- Student to teacher ratio: 18.09
- Hours in school day: 7:05 AM to 2:35 PM
- Campus type: Suburban
- Colors: Kelly green, black and white
- Mascot: Mighty Lion
- Team name: Lions and Lady Lions
- Rival: Acadiana High School
- Newspaper: Parlez-Vous
- Yearbook: Lions' Din
- Website: www.lpssonline.com/schools/lafayettehighschool

Lafayette High School (LHS) is a public four-year public high school located at 3000 West Congress Street in Lafayette, Louisiana, United States. It is operated by the Lafayette Parish School System.

The school serves students in grades 9 through 12. Lafayette High School's current principal is Layne Edelman, who became principal beginning with the 2024–2025 school year.

== Campus ==
Lafayette High School began the 2025–2026 school year in a newly constructed campus. The new facility is a 330,000-square-foot, three-story building designed to accommodate up to 2,300 students. Approximately 1,800 students and 170 faculty members were expected to occupy the campus when it opened for the 2025–2026 school year.

The new campus includes classrooms and laboratories, career and technical education spaces, and athletic facilities. Construction of the campus was part of a major investment by the Lafayette Parish School System, with the facility reported at a cost of approximately $120 million.

== Administration ==
Layne Edelman is the principal of Lafayette High School. She previously served as principal of Acadiana High School and began her career teaching social studies at Ovey Comeaux High School. Edelman is a graduate of Lafayette High School.

== Athletics ==
Lafayette High School's athletic teams compete as the Lions and Lady Lions. The school's mascot is the Mighty Lion, and its primary colors are Kelly green, black, and white.

Lafayette High School competes in the LHSAA.

== Academics ==
Lafayette High is home to the Academy of Health Careers, one of the magnet programs of the Lafayette Parish School System.

== Athletics ==
Lafayette High athletics competes in the LHSAA.

== Notable alumni ==
- Armand Duplantis, World record holder, reigning Olympic and World Champion in the Track and field event Pole Vault
- Paul Bako, MLB player for the Cincinnati Reds and Chicago Cubs
- David Benoit, former NBA player for the Utah Jazz, the New Jersey Nets and the Orlando Magic
- Ross Brupbacher, former NFL player for the Chicago Bears
- Lance Cormier, former MLB player (Arizona Diamondbacks, Atlanta Braves, Baltimore Orioles, Tampa Bay Rays, Los Angeles Dodgers)
- Trev Faulk, former NFL player for the St. Louis Rams
- Cedric Figaro, former NFL player for the San Diego Chargers, Indianapolis Colts, Cleveland Browns, St. Louis Rams
- Jerry Fontenot, former NFL player for the Chicago Bears, New Orleans Saints and Cincinnati Bengals
- Leigh Hennessy, world champion gymnast and movie stunt performer
- Phil Nugent, former NFL player for the Denver Broncos
- Autumn!, rapper
