= Cedric Figaro =

American football player (born 1966)

No. 51, 58, 53, 52, 57
- Position: Linebacker

Personal information
- Born: August 17, 1966 (age 60); Lafayette, Louisiana, U.S.
- Listed height: 6 ft 3 in (1.91 m)
- Listed weight: 242 lb (110 kg)

Career information
- High school: Lafayette
- College: Notre Dame
- NFL draft: 1988: 6th round, 152nd overall pick

Career history
- San Diego Chargers (1988–1990); Indianapolis Colts (1991); Cleveland Browns (1991–1992); Atlanta Falcons (1994)*; Amsterdam Admirals (1995); St. Louis Rams (1995–1996); Amsterdam Admirals (1997)
- * Offseason or practice squad member only

Awards and highlights
- Third-team All-American (1986)

Career NFL statistics
- Tackles: 161
- Fumble recoveries: 5
- Interceptions: 2
- Stats at Pro Football Reference

Cedric Noah Figaro (born August 17, 1966) is an American former professional football player who was a linebacker for seven seasons in the National Football League (NFL) and two in the World League of American Football (WLAF).

Figaro was born and raised in Lafayette, Louisiana and played scholastically at LaFayette High School. He played collegiately for the Notre Dame Fighting Irish, where he was honored by Football News as a third-team All-American.

Figaro was selected by the San Diego Chargers in the sixth round of the 1988 NFL draft. He spent three years with the Chargers and started 14 of the 16 games in 1989. He signed with the Indianapolis Colts for the 1991 campaign, but was waived after appearing in just one game. He signed with the Cleveland Browns, appearing in 12 games for them, and in 16 the following year.

Figaro was out of professional football for two years, but then joined the Amsterdam Admirals of the WLAF in 1995. Following the WLAF season, he was back in the NFL with the St. Louis Rams (1995 & 1996). He finished his career in 1997, again with the Admirals.

Figaro is currently the athletic director for his alma mater, Lafayette High School in his hometown of Lafayette, Louisiana.
