= Southside High School (Louisiana) =

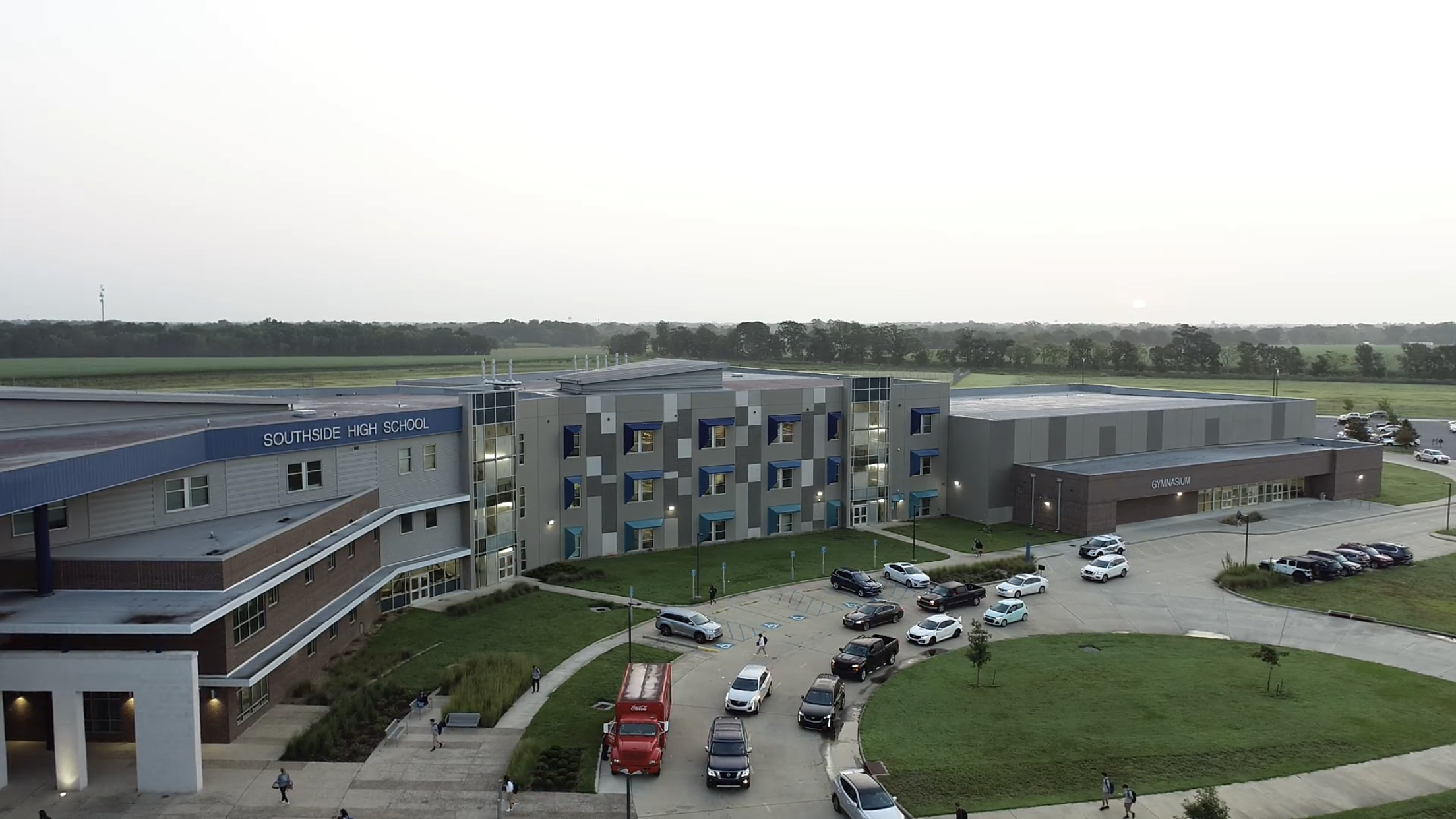

Location
- 312 Almonaster Road; Youngsville, Louisiana 70592; United States; 30.0895°N 91.9708°W

Information
- Type: Public
- Established: 2016
- Principal: Allison Bloomer
- Teaching staff: 81.89 (FTE)
- Grades: 9 to 12
- Enrollment: 1,891 (2023–2024)
- Student to teacher ratio: 23.09
- Colors: Teal, Navy, Silver
- Sports: Volleyball, Football, Baseball
- Mascot: Shark
- Nickname: Sharks

Southside High School is a high school located in the city of Youngsville, Louisiana, and is a part of the Lafayette Parish School System. It located in the southern area of the parish. The school is the newest school in the parish, opening for the 2017–2018 school year, with the first graduating class being the class of 2020. Construction began in late April 2016, and finished in August 2017. The school is funded by the USDA.

== History ==
=== Naming, mascot, and school colors selection ===
In early April 2016, the Lafayette School Board made their final decision on the name for Southside High School, after the naming process had begun in December 2015. In a 8–1 vote, the current name was voted for by members of the board. Some of the other proposed names were Youngsville High School, Caneview High, Cypress High, and Steven Bennett High School. The selection of the school's name was highly debated by the board. Youngsville Mayor Ken Ritter stated that he felt that naming the school Youngsville High School would "invoke a sense of place and a sense of pride". The motion to name the school after Bennett, a Lafayette native and late U.S. Air Force Captain who posthumously received the Medal of Honor, was voted against in a 8–1 vote.

After the name of the high school was decided, principal Catherine Cassidy formed a student committee on which students from the surrounding zoned schools served on. The goal was to decide what mascot the school would adopt as well as the colors of the school. The shark was "overwhelmingly voted" to be the school's mascot, (although the committee had also considered the yellow jacket or a hornet), and the school's colors were chosen to be teal, navy, and silver.

=== Construction and opening ===
Later in April 2016, construction for the high school began. It was designed by Abell Crozier Davis Architects and Pfluger Architects, with construction managed by The Lemoine Company. Lafayette Parish Superintendent Donald Aguillard vowed that the school would have a focus on the arts, as well as being a technology-rich environment. The project cost the district more than $60 million.

According to Aguillard, the decision to construct the school in Youngsville marked the first time in 47 years that a new public high school was built in Lafayette Parish:

The decision to build here in Youngsville is one of courage, especially since there are so many needs in the school system across the parish. We’re breaking ground today for the first new public high school built in Lafayette Parish in 47 years. That’s … wow. As we move public education in Lafayette Parish into the 21st century, we are going to work diligently to ensure that all of our education needs are fulfilled.

In late 2016, the logo for the high school was chosen. On August 9, 2017, the school opened, welcoming about 675 freshmen and sophomore students.

=== Spike in enrollment ===
In December 2018, the district announced plans to address an unexpected increase in enrollment figures. Several solutions were proposed, including moving six portable classroom buildings to the high school, a small-scale rezoning to move some students to another school, and collapsing several of the school's collaborative spaces into traditional classrooms.

In late 2019, the school's enrollment numbers sat at 1,683 students, 283 students over what the school's classrooms were designed to accommodate. Originally, six portable buildings were going to be moved to the school to resolve this enrollment spike, but this would've cost $260,000 in school system funds to pay for the needed infrastructure, causing the board to reject the plan in October 2019.

=== Temporary closure in November 2020 ===
In November 2020, the school temporarily closed for two weeks to prevent the spread of COVID-19. From November 15 to November 30, the school would shift to virtual learning only. The move came after an evaluation showed that 11% of the school's students had contacted the virus from community activities outside the school. A few other schools either temporarily closed or cancelled activities at around the same time, including the temporary closure of Loreauville High School from November 11, 2020, to November 20, 2020.

=== Police investigation into alleged abuse of special education students ===
On March 31, 2021, the Youngsville Police Department began investigating abuse allegations against a teacher who was reported to have grabbed, poked, and slapped Special Education students. Laurie Gresham (a former substitute teacher at the school) had released a voluntary statement about the alleged abuse on the same day, and was fired after discussing it with board members. Two victims were identified as alleged victims of the teacher in question. The mother of one of the alleged victims withdrew her son from the school, and considered legal action against the administration, after Southside administrators had told her to write a statement in support of the teacher and lied to her about there being only one incident, as well as the existence of surveillance footage.

In the incident allegedly captured on video, the teacher "grabbed the student by the neck and yelled at him". The incident shown in the video occurred on March 10, 2019, and Kathy Aloisio, who is the middle and secondary schools director, said that she had learned of the incident on March 19. In a recorded meeting with Gresham, Aloisio was "mortified when [she] saw it".

The mother stated that, while she does not know if the use of physical restraint was done in an intentionally harmful manner or not (she had not seen the video), she was more "appalled by the fact that other incidents are happening in the classroom that [were] not reported to me.”

Lafayette Parish School System Public Information Officer Allison Dickerson said the system "could not provide comment [about the incident] as these are personnel matters."

=== Mercury spill incident ===
On April 17, 2023, a student brought a vial of mercury to the school, which was then dropped and spilled onto the floor of an undisclosed classroom. Waste cleanup agencies, as well as the Department of Environmental Quality, were called, and crisis response protocols were engaged. The spill was properly contained and did not affect the air quality of the school. It is not known why the student brought the mercury to school. The school was closed until April 19, 2023, in order for the spill to be properly contained.

== Athletics ==
Southside High athletics competes in the LHSAA.

Southside opened their first on-campus football stadium for the 2025 football season, nicknamed, "The Reef". The first game played on the field took place on September 5, 2025, a 35-28 loss against 2A Notre Dame of Crowley.

== Importance ==
The United States Department of Agriculture stated in a 2021 blog post that the school had "support[ed] the fast-growing community in and around the parish".

Additionally, USDA Rural Development Business Programs Director Elizabeth Doster commented on the school's local importance:

It has really changed all of Youngsville. The public schools in Louisiana are challenged. They are old, and the facilities are obsolete. When they built this school, it totally changed the demographics here. The whole population has boomed in this area, with hundreds of new businesses. It’s night and day for this community.

== Notable alumni ==
- Malik Nabers (2021), football player for the New York Giants

== See also ==
- Education in Louisiana
- Lafayette Parish School System
- List of high schools in Louisiana
