= Tommy Hodson =

American football player (born 1967)

Tom Hodson
No. 13, 14
- Position: Quarterback

Personal information
- Born: January 28, 1967 (age 59); Mathews, Louisiana, U.S.
- Listed height: 6 ft 3 in (1.91 m)
- Listed weight: 195 lb (88 kg)

Career information
- High school: Central Lafourche (Mathews)
- College: LSU
- NFL draft: 1990: 3rd round, 59th overall pick

Career history
- New England Patriots (1990–1992); Miami Dolphins (1993); Dallas Cowboys (1994); New Orleans Saints (1995–1996)

Awards and highlights
- 3× First-team All-SEC (1986, 1987, 1989); SEC Freshman of the Year (1986)

Career NFL statistics
- Passing attempts: 320
- Passing completions: 174
- Completion percentage: 54.4%
- TD–INT: 7–11
- Passing yards: 1,823
- Passer rating: 64.1
- Stats at Pro Football Reference

Thomas Paul Hodson (born January 28, 1967) is an American former professional football player who was a quarterback in the National Football League (NFL). He played college football for the LSU Tigers of Louisiana State University, where he holds several school passing records. Hodson was selected by the New England Patriots in the third round of the 1990 NFL draft. In the NFL, he served primarily as a backup quarterback, playing for four different teams in six seasons, though he did start twelve games for the Patriots in the early 1990s.

== Early life ==
Hodson was born in Mathews, Louisiana in Lafourche Parish. He played quarterback at Central Lafourche High School, where he passed for 4,361 yards and 36 touchdowns. He also played basketball, averaging 27.4 points per game.

== College career ==
In 1986, Hodson went to Louisiana State University (LSU). As quarterback for LSU's football team, Hodson led LSU to two SEC Championships, first as a freshman (1986) and then as a junior (1988). During his 44 regular season games at LSU (1986–1989), Hodson passed for 9,115 yards and 69 touchdowns, becoming the first quarterback in SEC history to surpass 8,000 career passing yards, and the first quarterback in SEC history to surpass 60 career passing touchdowns. Hodson passed for over 2,000 yards during each of his four seasons at LSU, becoming the third player in NCAA history to achieve that feat. During his freshman season, Hodson was voted first team All-SEC, becoming the first LSU quarterback to be awarded that honor since the legendary Bert Jones (first team All-SEC, 1972). Hodson was selected first team All-SEC during each of his four seasons at LSU, the only player in school history to achieve that feat.

During Hodson's freshman season (1986), he led LSU to its first AP Top 10 finish since 1970 and its first SEC Championship since 1970. In Hodson's first game, he led No. 14 LSU to a 35–17 victory over No. 7 Texas A&M. Later in the season, Hodson led No. 18 LSU to a 14–10 victory at No. 6 Alabama.

During Hodson's sophomore season (1987), he led LSU to its first AP Top 5 finish since 1961. Major victories included No. 6 LSU's 17–3 victory at No. 15 Texas A&M, No. 9 LSU's 34–9 victory at Tennessee (LSU's first win ever at Neyland Stadium), No. 4 LSU's 13–13 tie with No. 7 Ohio State, No. 7 LSU's 13–10 victory over No. 19 Florida, No. 7 LSU's 26–23 victory at No. 16 Georgia, and No. 7 LSU's 30–13 victory over No. 8 South Carolina in the Gator Bowl.

During Hodson's junior season (1988), he led LSU to another SEC Championship, and a No. 19 finish in the AP Poll. Major victories included No. 18 LSU's 27–0 victory over No. 10 Texas A&M, LSU's 7–6 victory over No. 4 Auburn (the famous Earthquake Game), and No. 13 LSU's 19–18 victory at No. 18 Alabama.

College passing statistics*
Season	Team	G	Cmp	Att	Pct	Yds	Yds/att	TD	Int	Rate
1986	LSU	11	175†	288†	60.8	2,261†	7.9	19†	8	142.9†
1987	LSU	11	162	265	61.1	2,125†	8.0	15	9	140.4
1988	LSU	11	154	293	52.6	2,074	7.1	13†	12	118.5
1989	LSU	11	183	317	57.7	2,655†	8.4†	22†	12	143.4†
Career	LSU	44	647	1,163	58.0	9,115	7.8	69	41	136.3

*Does not include bowl games.

†Led SEC

== Professional career ==
Hodson was selected in the third round with the 59th overall pick in the 1990 NFL draft by the New England Patriots. He started the last 6 games of his rookie season, passing for 968 yards. However, during Hodson's next two seasons with the Patriots, he was only allowed 68 passing attempts in 1991 and 91 passing attempts in 1992. From 1993 to 1996, Hodson served as a back-up for the Miami Dolphins, the Dallas Cowboys, and the New Orleans Saints, but saw no playing time except for 5 passing attempts in 1995 for the Saints.

NFL passing statistics
Year	Team	Games	Cmp	Att	Pct	Yards	Yds/Cmp	TD	Long	Int	Fumbles	Rating
1990	NE	7	85	156	54.5	968	6.21	4	56	5	0	68.5
1991	NE	16	36	68	52.9	345	5.07	1	32	4	2	47.7
1992	NE	9	50	91	54.9	496	5.45	2	54	2	1	68.8
1995	NO	4	3	5	60.0	14	2.80	0	9	0	0	64.6
Career		36	174	320	54.4	1,823	5.70	7	56	11	3	64.1

== Later life ==
On February 2, 2005, The Boston Globe wrote a feature on Hodson. In the article, the Globe quotes Hodson as saying: "Although I didn't have great success as a professional I played six years and it was a great honor to play in the NFL. I am grateful I was able to play six years." The Globe reported that Hodson lives in Baton Rouge with his wife and his 10-year-old identical twin daughters, and quoted Hodson as saying that he lives in Baton Rouge because he has "fond memories" at LSU and because it is "a good place to raise a family."

== See also ==
- LSU Tigers football statistical leaders
