= Lafayette Parish School System =

School district in Louisiana

Location
- 202 Rue Iberville; Lafayette, Louisiana; 70508; 337-521-7000 Lafayette Parish, Louisiana United States

District information
- Type: Public (government funded)
- Motto: Strength. Tradition. Excellence.
- Grades: K-12
- President: Hannah Smith Mason
- Vice-president: David LeJeune
- Superintendent: Francis Touchet
- Budget: $805,822,298.00
- NCES District ID: 2200870

Students and staff
- Students: 29,694
- Staff: 4,100

Other information
- Website: www.lpssonline.com

The Lafayette Parish School System (LPSS) or Lafayette Parish School Board (LPSB) is a school district based in Lafayette, Louisiana.

The district's boundaries are those of Lafayette Parish.

== Board members ==
As of April 2026, the school board consists of 9 members:

- District One: David LeJeune
- District Two: Ted Davidson
- District Three: Joshua Edmond
- District Four: Amy M. Trahan
- District Five: Britt Latiolais
- District Six: Roddy Bergeron
- District Seven: Kate Bailey Labue
- District Eight: Hannah Smith Mason
- District Nine: Jeremy Hidalgo

== Schools of Choice program ==
Lafayette Parish School System currently offers sixteen Schools of Choice from grades K-12. These include the following:

=== Elementary school programs ===
- Arts & Technology (J. Wallace James)
- Environmental Sciences (L. Leo Judice)
- International Baccalaureate and Project Bright IDEA (J. W. Faulk)
- World Languages Immersion Academy
  - French (Evangeline, Myrtle Place, Prairie)
  - Mandarin Chinese (Corporal Michael Middlebrooks)
  - Spanish (Alice Boucher)

=== Middle school academies ===
- Arts Academy (L. J. Alleman)
- Biomedical Academy (Carencro Middle)
- Environmental Sciences Academy (Lafayette Middle)
- World Languages Immersion Academy (Scott Middle)

=== High school academies ===
- Health Academy (Lafayette High School)
- Academy of Business & Finance (Acadiana High School)
- Academy of Engineering (Northside High School & David Thibodaux STEM Magnet Academy)
- Academy of Information Technology - AOIT (Carencro High School)
- Academy of Legal Studies (Northside High School)
- Academy of Visual & Applied Arts (Comeaux High School)
- David Thibodaux STEM Magnet Academy
- Early College Academy

Each one offers something different. A student can get into a school of choice one of two ways; by lottery drawing, or application into the school of choice if slots remain after the lottery takes place. The lottery drawing is conducted in the last week of February, unless holidays interfere.

=== Gifted and Talented Program ===
In addition to the specialized academies, LPSS offers a Gifted and Talented program for students who show exceptional abilities in areas like math, language arts, science, and social studies. This program provides advanced lessons and activities to help students reach their full potential. Students are selected for the program based on assessments, teacher recommendations, and test scores. The program is available at many of the district’s Schools of Choice, and students receive individualized instruction designed to challenge and support them. To be considered for the program, students must undergo an evaluation process that includes testing and teacher feedback. Students are selected based on assessments, teacher recommendations, and test scores.

== List of Schools ==
=== High Schools ===
- Acadiana High School
- Carencro High School
- Edward J. Sam Accelerated School of Lafayette
- Lafayette High School
- Northside High School
- Southside High School

=== Middle Schools ===
- Acadian Middle School
- Broussard Middle School
- Carencro Middle School
- E.A. Martin Middle School
- Judice Middle School
- L.J. Alleman Middle School
- Milton Middle School
- Paul Breaux Middle School
- Scott Middle School
- Youngsville Middle School

=== Elementary Schools ===
- Alice Boucher Elementary School
- Dr. Raphael A. Baranco Elementary School
- Broadmoor Elementary School
- Carencro Bob Lilly Elementary School
- Charles M. Burke Elementary School
- Duson Elementary School
- Ernest Gallet Elementary School
- Evangeline Elementary School
- Green T. Lindon Elementary School
- J.W. Faulk Elementary School
- J.W. James Elementary School
- Katharine Drexel Early Childhood Education Center
- L. Leo Judice Elementary School
- Lafayette Elementary School
- Live Oak Elementary School
- Martial F. Billeaud Elementary School
- Milton Elementary School
- Myrtle Place Elementary School
- Ossun Elementary School
- Corporal Michael Middlebrook Elementary School
- Prairie Elementary School
- Ridge Elementary School
- Truman Elementary School
- Westside Elementary School
- Woodvale Elementary School
