= Herb Tyler =

American football player

Herb Tyler is a former American football player. He was a quarterback for the LSU Tigers from 1995 to 1998.

== College ==
In 1995, Tyler, a native of New Orleans, Louisiana, went to Louisiana State University (LSU) Late in his freshman season, Tyler replaced injured senior Jamie Howard to become LSU's starting quarterback. Over Tyler's next 31 games as a starter, LSU went 26–5, including a #12 ranking in the 1996 final AP Poll and a #13 ranking in the 1997 final AP Poll (it was the first time LSU had finished in the final AP Poll since 1988).

Major victories during that time included unranked LSU's 28–0 victory over #14 Arkansas in 1995 (televised by ABC), #21 LSU's 19–15 victory at #14 Auburn in 1996 (televised by ESPN), and, most notably, #14 LSU's 28–21 victory over #1 Florida in 1997 (televised by ESPN).

In the victory over #1 Florida, Tyler ran for two touchdowns off the option play, including one for 40 yards and one for 11 yards. However, during Tyler's last 7 games as a starter, LSU went 1–6. In his last game as a starter, at #10 Notre Dame, Tyler suffered a hamstring injury. Because of that, he was not able to start in the last game of his senior year at #13 Arkansas.

A mobile quarterback, Tyler passed for 5,876 yards and 40 touchdowns and rushed for 778 yards and 23 touchdowns during his time at LSU.

== Professional career ==
In 2001, Tyler was the quarterback for the Baton Rouge Blaze. After the Blaze went defunct at the end of the season, Tyler became the quarterback for the now-defunct Houma Bayou Bucks of the National Indoor Football League.
