= Guilian Gary =

American football player and coach (born 1980)

Current position
- Title: Wide receivers coach
- Team: Towson

Biographical details
- Born: June 5, 1980 (age 46); Horseheads, New York, U.S.

Playing career
- 1998–2001: Maryland
- Position: Wide receiver

Coaching career (HC unless noted)
- 2003: Holy Cross (WR)
- 2004: Georgetown (WR)
- 2005–present: Towson (WR)

Accomplishments and honors

Awards
- Second-team All-ACC (2001)

Guilian Austin Gary (born June 5, 1980) is an American football coach and former player. He played college football at the University of Maryland, College Park where he was a star wide receiver. He was the first Maryland player lead the team in punt returning for four years, and the first since 1961 to lead the team in receiving for three years. Gary is most known for the last-minute touchdown reception he made during the 2001 season which secured the Atlantic Coast Conference (ACC) championship for Maryland.

== Early life ==
Gary was born in Horseheads, New York to parents Gregory and Brenda Gary. His father Gregory Gary Sr. played basketball at St. Bonaventure and was a part of the Bonnies '70 Final Four team. Brother Greg, played college baseball at St. Bonaventure. Guilian Gary attended Horseheads High School, where he played football as a wingback and defensive back. As a senior in 1997, he recorded 24 receptions, 482 receiving yards, seven receiving touchdowns, 95 carries, 948 rushing yards, and 14 rushing touchdowns. The Star-Gazette named him a Co-Player of the Year. SuperPrep ranked him as the number-four college prospect in the state. His team captured consecutive Section 4 Class AA championships in his junior and senior years. Gary, also was an All-American Lacrosse player at Horseheads.

== College career ==
Gary attended the University of Maryland where he majored in family studies and played football for the Maryland Terrapins. In 1998, he saw action as a true freshman in nine games as a receiver and on special teams. He recorded no receptions, but led the team in punt returns with 12 for 99 yards. In 1999, he saw action in all 11 games including three starts. He led the team in both receiving and punt returning. He made 24 receptions for 257 yards, 35 returns punts for 311 yards, and one kickoff return for 84 yards. That sole kick return came against ninth-ranked Georgia Tech, and set up a touchdown on the subsequent possession. In 2000, he played in all 11 games, which included 10 starts. He again led the team in receiving and punt returning. Gary recorded 40 receptions, 568 receiving yards, and seven touchdowns. Against Georgia Tech, he tied the school record for most touchdown receptions with three. That tied Jermaine Lewis's performance against West Virginia in 1993 and James Milling against North Carolina in 1986. That season, he became the first Terrapin to lead the team in punt returns in three consecutive seasons, and he made it four the following year.

Before the 2001 season, Maryland hired a new head coach, Ralph Friedgen, who engineered a first-year turnaround for the program. During summer training camp, Gary took an awkward hit and suffered a cervical spine injury. He was evacuated to the University of Maryland Shock Trauma Center in Baltimore, but fully recovered. Against sixth-ranked Georgia Tech, Gary made a critical 18-yard reception to the Yellow Jackets' 46-yard line with 40 seconds left as part of a drive to push within field goal range. Nick Novak later kicked the tying field goal, and in overtime, kicked the game-winner. The win improved the Terps' record to 6–0 and secured bowl eligibility for Maryland for the first time since 1991. Against Virginia, Gary recorded five receptions for 99 yards and a 53-yard touchdown. In the penultimate regular season game, 13th-ranked Maryland played Clemson at Byrd Stadium. Gary recorded five receptions for 93 yards and a touchdown, and the Terrapins won, 37–20, to ensure at least a share of the Atlantic Coast Conference (ACC) championship with Florida State. The following week, Maryland played its last conference game against NC State. In the final minutes of regulation, with Maryland trailing, quarterback Shaun Hill mounted a 61-yard drive. It culminated with an eight-yard pass to Gary in the corner of the end zone to win the game, 23–19, with 41 seconds remaining. The win secured the outright ACC championship. Throughout the season, Gary was quarterback Shaun Hill's preferred receiver, and led the balanced Maryland receiving corps. Gary recorded 49 receptions, 727 yards, and six touchdowns. He was the first Maryland player since Gary Collins in 1961 to lead the team in receptions in three consecutive seasons. Gary was named an All-ACC player, which made him the first Maryland receiver honored as such since 1995. About that championship-winning season, Gary said in 2009:

"Every day, we were told we were nothing. Every day, we were told we were picked to finish seventh in the conference for a reason. Really, we don't have a lot of fond football memories. My [scrapbook of newspaper clippings] has a thick coat of dust on it."

Gary also lettered in lacrosse during the 2002 season and saw action in two games as a defensive midfielder for the Terrapins.

== Professional career ==
Gary was signed as an undrafted free agent by the Carolina Panthers of the National Football League (NFL) on April 24, 2002. He was involved in a fight with fellow receiver Steve Smith during training camp, a fight that was the first of three separate such incidents during Smith's NFL career. Gary was released by the Panthers on August 6, 2002.

He then served as the wide receivers coach at Holy Cross in 2003. Under his guidance, Ari Confesor set a school record for all-purpose yards, and recorded 90 receptions for 1,213 yards and nine touchdowns. The following season, Gary took the same position at Georgetown. In 2005, he was hired by Towson University to serve as the Towson Tigers wide receivers coach. In 2009, Gordy Combs was fired as the Tigers' head coach and replaced by Rob Ambrose. He chose to retain Gary and said, "I know Guilian was a very talented wide receiver at the University of Maryland and I’ve heard that he is extremely skilled as a wide receivers coach."
