= 2001 Maryland Terrapins football team =

American college football season

2001 Maryland Terrapins football
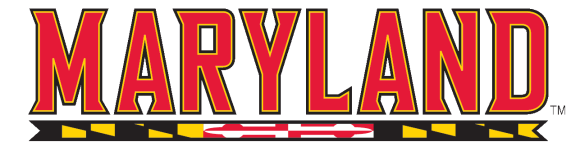

ACC champion

Orange Bowl, L 23–56 vs. Florida
- Conference: Atlantic Coast Conference

Ranking
- Coaches: No. 10
- AP: No. 11
- Record: 10–2 (7–1 ACC)
- Head coach: Ralph Friedgen (1st season)
- Offensive coordinator: Charlie Taaffe (1st season)
- Defensive coordinator: Gary Blackney (1st season)
- Home stadium: Byrd Stadium

2001 Atlantic Coast Conference football standings
	Conf.			Overall
Team	W		L	W		L
No. 11 Maryland $	7	–	1	10	–	2
No. 15 Florida State	6	–	2	8	–	4
North Carolina	5	–	3	8	–	5
Clemson	4	–	4	7	–	5
No. 24 Georgia Tech	4	–	4	8	–	5
NC State	4	–	4	7	–	5
Wake Forest	3	–	5	6	–	5
Virginia	3	–	5	5	–	7
Duke	0	–	8	0	–	11
$ – BCS representative as conference champion; Rankings from AP Poll

The 2001 Maryland Terrapins football team represented the University of Maryland in its 49th season in the Atlantic Coast Conference (ACC). The Terps closed the regular season with a record of 10–1, with its only loss coming to Florida State. The Terps won the ACC championship and were granted a Bowl Championship Series berth in the 2002 Orange Bowl. It was Maryland's first bowl game since 1990, first winning season since 1995, and first conference championship since 1985.

== Preseason ==
In 2001, despite the Terrapins' disappointing recent finishes, Ralph Friedgen inherited a good situation as their new head coach. His predecessor, Ron Vanderlinden, and the Maryland team had just barely fallen shy of winning seasons for the last two years in a row. Additionally, the 2001 squad was returning many experienced, quality players.

== Regular season ==
Maryland won its first four games, including against strong conference competitor Wake Forest (27–20) and regional rival West Virginia (32–20), to earn a spot in the AP rankings for the first time since September 1995, at #25. The Terrapins then met their main rival Virginia in College Park, and beat them by a 20-point margin (41–21).

The Terps went on to Atlanta to face #15 Georgia Tech. With 5 seconds left on the clock in the fourth quarter, and Maryland trailing 17–14, the Terps were forced to try for the tying field goal from 46 yards. Their kicker, redshirt freshman Nick Novak, had earlier missed a field goal attempt, bouncing it off an upright, and had an overall unimpressive record in his early career. However, Novak made the 46-yard field goal, sending the game into overtime, where he again made good on a 26-yard field goal, winning the game for Maryland (20–17). By the end of his college career Novak would go on to become the ACC all-time leading point scorer with 393 points, and capture the ACC record for 80 field goals.

After sailing past Duke (59–17) on Homecoming weekend, then #10 Maryland traveled to Tallahassee to face #18 Florida State. Despite being tied through the third quarter (31–31), Florida State handed Maryland their only defeat (52–31) during the season, dropping their AP ranking to #15.

Maryland then defeated Troy State, 47–14. The Terrapins played the season's final home game against Clemson, which they defeated, 37–20, to ensure at least a share of the ACC championship. The following week, Maryland secured the ACC title outright when quarterback Shaun Hill threw a short touchdown pass to Guilian Gary in the front corner of the end zone with 41 seconds remaining to defeat NC State, 23–19. The Terrapins closed the regular season ranked #6 in the nation and first in the conference, with a record of 10–1 (ACC: 7–1). The Terrapins, having secured the 2001 ACC championship, became the first time any team other than Florida State had won it outright since Florida State entered the conference in 1991. Additionally, Ralph Friedgen became the only first-year coach to ever win the ACC title.

== Postseason ==
As ACC champions, the Terps earned a berth in the Orange Bowl to face Steve Spurrier's #5 Florida out of the SEC, in a BCS match-up. The Gators beat the Terrapins with a lop-sided result (56–23). Thus, Maryland ended the post-season with a 10–2 record, ranked #10 in the nation.

== Schedule ==
Date	Time	Opponent	Rank	Site	TV	Result	Attendance
September 1	12:00 pm	North Carolina		Byrd Stadium; College Park, MD	ABC	W 23–7	44,080
September 8	6:00 pm	Eastern Michigan*		Byrd Stadium; College Park, MD		W 50–3	42,105
September 22	3:30 pm	at Wake Forest		Groves Stadium; Winston-Salem, NC		W 27–20	22,372
September 29	12:00 pm	West Virginia*		Byrd Stadium; College Park, MD (rivalry)		W 32–20	40,166
October 6	12:00 pm	Virginia	No. 25	Byrd Stadium; College Park, MD (rivalry)	JPS	W 41–21	44,197
October 11	7:30 pm	at No. 15 Georgia Tech	No. 22	Bobby Dodd Stadium; Atlanta, GA	ESPN	W 20–17 ^{OT}	40,574
October 20	1:00 pm	Duke^{†}	No. 12	Byrd Stadium; College Park, MD	JPS	W 59–17	43,528
October 27	3:30 pm	at No. 18 Florida State	No. 10	Doak Campbell Stadium; Tallahassee, FL	ABC	L 31–52	82,565
November 3	1:00 pm	Troy State*	No. 15	Byrd Stadium; College Park, MD		W 47–14	38,415
November 10	7:00 pm	Clemson	No. 13	Byrd Stadium; College Park, MD	ESPN2	W 37–20	52,462
November 17	7:45 pm	at NC State	No. 10	Carter–Finley Stadium; Raleigh, NC	ESPN	W 23–19	51,500
January 2	8:00 pm	vs. No. 5 Florida*	No. 6	Pro Player Stadium; Miami Gardens, FL (Orange Bowl)	ABC	L 23–56	73,640
*Non-conference game; ^{†}Homecoming; Rankings from AP Poll released prior to the game; All times are in Eastern time

== Roster ==
2001 Maryland Terrapins football team roster
Players
Coaches
Offense

Pos.	#	Name	Class
OL		C.J. Brooks
OL		Lamar Bryant
RB	9	Jason Crawford	Fr
OT	78	Matt Crawford	Jr
RB		Chris Downs	Sr
TE	82	Jeff Dugan	So
RB		Bernie Fiddler	So
TE	87	Ryan Flynn	Fr
C	67	Melvin Fowler	Sr
WR	21	Guilian Gary	Sr
QB		Latrez Harrison	Jr
QB	14	Shaun Hill	Sr
QB		Chris Kelley	Fr
RB		Chad Killian	Jr
FB	5	James Lynch	So
WR		Scooter Monroe
TE	88	Matt Murphy	Sr
RB	22	Rich Parson	Fr
RB	1	Bruce Perry	So
RB		Marc Riley	Sr
WR		Ike Roberts	Fr
WR		Maurice Shanks	Fr
WR		Steve Suter	Fr
WR		Daryl Whitmer	Sr
OL		Todd Wike
WR		Jafar Williams	So

Defense

Pos.	#	Name	Class
LB		Leroy Ambush	So
LB		Kevin Bishop
LB	51	Omid Janloo	Fr
DB		Jamal Chance	Jr
LB	47	Jon Condo	Fr
CB	30	Curome Cox	So
DL		C.J. Feldheim
CB	6	Domonique Foxworth	Fr
LB		Monte Graves
CB	19	Richard Harrigan	Sr
LB	42	E. J. Henderson	Jr
DT	98	Charles Hill	Sr
DB		Tony Jackson	Sr
LB	32	Leon Joe	So
DB		Randall Jones	Sr
DB		Rod Littles	Sr
LB		Marlon Moore	Sr
DB	28	Mohammad Emamhosseini	Sr
CB	11	Tony Okanlawon	Sr
DL		Durrand Roundtree
DT	57	Randy Starks	So
DB		Tyrone Stewart	Jr
DL		Ryan Swift
LB		Aaron Thompson
LB		Mike Whaley
DB		Curtis Williams	Fr
S	34	Madieu Williams	Jr
DB		Dennard Wilson

Special teams

Pos.	#	Name	Class
P	16	Brooks Barnard	Jr
K	46	Nick Novak	Fr
K		Vedad Siljkovic	Sr

Head coach

- Ralph Friedgen

Coordinators/assistant coaches

Legend

- (C) Team captain
- (S) Suspended
- (I) Ineligible
- Injured
- Redshirt

Roster
Last update: 2001-11-07

== Rankings ==
Ranking movements Legend: ██ Increase in ranking ██ Decrease in ranking — = Not ranked т = Tied with team above or below
	Week																
Poll	Pre	1	2	3	4	5	6	7	8	9	10	11	12	13	14	15	Final
AP	—	—	—	—	—	25	22	12	10	15	13	10	8	7	7	6	11
Coaches	—	—	—	—	—	25	20	14	12	16	11	9	9	7 т	7	6	10
BCS	Not released								8	—	15	12	12	11	10	10	Not released

== Game summaries ==
=== North Carolina ===
North Carolina at Maryland

Team	1	2	3	4	Total
Tar Heels	7	0	0	0	7
• Terrapins	7	2	0	14	23

- Date: September 1
- Location: Byrd Stadium, College Park, MD
- Game start: 12:10 pm EDT
- Elapsed time: 2:50
- Game attendance: 44,080
- Referee: Jack Childress
- TV announcers (ABC): Mike Tirico, David Norrie

Scoring summary
1	13:12	UNC	Willie Parker 77-yard run (J. Reed kick)	UNC 7–0
1	6:33	MD	J. Williams 20-yard pass from S. Hill (N. Novak kick)	Tied 7–7
2	11:43	MD	Safety, T. Stewart	MD 9–7
4	13:19	MD	S. Monroe 5-yard pass from S. Hill (N. Novak kick)	MD 16–7
4	6:35	MD	M. Riley 1-yard run (N. Novak kick)	MD 23–7

=== Eastern Michigan ===
Eastern Michigan at Maryland

Team	1	2	3	4	Total
Eagles	0	0	0	3	3
• Terrapins	13	14	14	9	50

- Date: September 8
- Location: Byrd Stadium, College Park, MD
- Game start: 6:08 pm EDT
- Elapsed time: 2:47
- Game attendance: 42,105
- Referee: James Knight

Scoring summary
1	10:07	MD	B. Perry 8-yard run (B. Barnard run failed)	MD 6–0
1	5:38	MD	M. Riley 1-yard run (N. Novak kick)	MD 13–0
2	6:33	MD	G. Gary 19-yard pass from S. Hill (S. Hill pass failed)	MD 19–0
2	3:37	MD	B. Perry 24-yard run (M. Shanks pass)	MD 27–0
3	12:10	MD	B. Perry 31-yard run (N. Novak kick)	MD 34–0
3	8:14	MD	S. Hill 4-yard run (N. Novak kick)	MD 41–0
4	12:43	MD	V. Siljkovic 44-yard field goal	MD 44–0
4	8:54	EMU	E. Klaban 44-yard field goal	MD 44–3
4	5:07	MD	J. Crawford 2-yard run (V. Siljkovic kick failed)	MD 50–3

=== at Wake Forest ===
Maryland at Wake Forest

Team	1	2	3	4	Total
• Terrapins	7	3	7	10	27
Demon Deacons	3	0	7	10	20

- Date: September 22
- Location: Groves Stadium, Winston-Salem, NC
- Game start: 3:38 pm EDT
- Elapsed time: 3:00
- Game attendance: 22,372
- Referee: Robert Wood III

Scoring summary
1	14:40	MD	Bruce Perry 80-yard run (N. Novak kick)	MD 7–0
1	5:28	WF	T. Ashe 25-yard field goal	MD 7–3
2	8:30	MD	Nick Novak 27-yard field goal	MD 10–3
3	8:20	MD	Marc Riley 1-yard run (N. Novak kick)	MD 17–3
3	1:47	WF	T. Williams 11-yard run (T. Ashe kick)	MD 17–10
4	12:31	MD	Nick Novak 29-yard field goal	MD 20–10
4	10:25	WF	T. Ashe 37-yard field goal	MD 20–13
4	8:38	MD	Bruce Perry 50-yard run (N. Novak kick)	MD 27–13
4	6:54	WF	J. Anderson 42-yard pass from J. MacPherson (T. Ashe kick)	MD 27–20

=== West Virginia ===
West Virginia at Maryland

Team	1	2	3	4	Total
Mountaineers	0	13	7	0	20
• Terrapins	7	12	6	7	32

- Date: September 29
- Location: Byrd Stadium, College Park, MD
- Game start: 12:05 pm EDT
- Elapsed time: 3:06
- Game attendance: 40,166
- Referee: Gene Steratore

=== Virginia ===
Virginia at No. 25 Maryland

Team	1	2	3	4	Total
Cavaliers	0	7	14	0	21
• No. 25 Terrapins	0	24	0	17	41

- Date: October 6
- Location: Byrd Stadium, College Park, MD
- Game start: 12:10 pm EDT
- Elapsed time: 3:20
- Game attendance: 44,197
- Referee: Robert Wood
- TV announcers (JPS): Steve Martin, Rick Walker, Mike Hogewood

=== Clemson ===
Clemson at No. 13 Maryland

Team	1	2	3	4	Total
Tigers	3	3	0	14	20
• No. 13 Terrapins	7	10	7	13	37

- Date: November 10
- Location: Byrd Stadium, College Park, MD
- Game start: 07:06 pm EST
- Elapsed time: 3:20
- Game attendance: 52,462
- Referee: Joseph Rider
- TV announcers (ESPN2): Dave Barnett, Mike Golic, Bill Curry, Michele Tafoya

=== at NC State ===
No. 10 Maryland at NC State

Team	1	2	3	4	Total
• No. 10 Terrapins	0	3	7	13	23
Wolfpack	3	6	3	7	19

- Date: November 17
- Location: Carter–Finley Stadium, Raleigh, NC
- Game start: 7:45 pm EDT
- Elapsed time: 3:25
- Game attendance: 51,500
- Game weather: 60 °F (16 °C), Clear
- Referee: Joseph Rider
- TV announcers (ESPN): Ron Franklin, Mike Gottfried, Adrian Karsten

Scoring summary
1	3:50	NCST	A. Kiker 33-yard field goal	NCST 3–0
2	10:40	NCST	A. Kiker 23-yard field goal	NCST 6–0
2	1:38	NCST	A. Kiker 41-yard field goal	NCST 9–0
2	0:05	MD	Nick Novak 25-yard field goal	NCST 9–3
3	8:51	MD	Guilian Gary 5-yard pass from Shaun Hill (Novak kick)	MD 10–9
3	3:45	NCST	A. Kiker 27-yard field goal	NCST 12–10
4	9:32	MD	Shaun Hill 6-yard run (pass failed)	MD 16–12
4	3:59	NCST	C. Jackson 1-yard pass from Philip Rivers (Kiker kick)	NCST 19–16
4	0:41	MD	Guilian Gary 8-yard pass from Shaun Hill (Novak kick)	MD 23–19

=== vs. No. 5 Florida (Orange Bowl) ===
Orange Bowl: #5 Florida Gators (9–2) vs. #6 Maryland Terrapins (10–1)

Quarter	1	2	3	4	Total
Florida	14	14	21	7	56
Maryland	7	3	0	13	23

at Pro Player Stadium, Miami, Florida

- Date: January 2, 2002
- Game time: 8:00 p.m. EST
- Game weather: Clear, 71 °F (22 °C)
- Game attendance: 73,640
- Referee: James Sprenger
- TV announcers (ABC): Brad Nessler, Bob Griese, and Lynn Swann
- Box Score

Game information

First quarter

- FLA – Earnest Graham 1-yard run (Jeff Chandler kick), 9:51. Florida 7–0. Drive: 10 plays, 83 yards, 3:59.
- FLA – Taylor Jacobs 46-yard pass from Brock Berlin (Jeff Chandler kick), 0:12. Florida 14–0. Drive: 2 plays, 55 yards, 0:47.
- MD – Jafar Williams 64-yard pass from Shaun Hill (Nick Novak kick), 0:00. Florida 14–7. Drive: 1 play, 69 yards, 0:12.

Second quarter

- MD – Nick Novak 20-yard field goal, 12:20. Florida 14–10. Drive: 4 plays, 1 yard, 0:45.
- FLA – Taylor Jacobs 15-yard pass from Rex Grossman (Jeff Chandler kick), 2:18. Florida 21–10. Drive: 10 plays, 72 yards, 3:45.
- FLA – Jabar Gaffney 4-yard pass from Rex Grossman (Jeff Chandler kick), 0:03. Florida 28–10. Drive: 6 plays, 64 yards, 1:21.

Third quarter

- FLA – Earnest Graham 6-yard run (Jeff Chandler kick), 11:02. Florida 35–10. Drive: 10 plays, 65 yards, 3:38.
- FLA – Robert Gillespie 11-yard run (Jeff Chandler kick), 7:26. Florida 42–10. Drive: 4 plays, 74 yards, 1:29.
- FLA – Jabar Gaffney 33-yard pass from Rex Grossman (Jeff Chandler kick), 2:52. Florida 49–10. Drive: 2 plays, 68 yards, 0:19.

Fourth quarter

- MD – Marc Riley 1-yard run (Nick Novak kick), 11:56. Florida 49–17. Drive: 15 plays, 71 yards, 5:56.
- FLA – Carlos Perez 10-yard pass from Rex Grossman (Jeff Chandler kick), 10:16. Florida 56–17. Drive: 4 plays, 69 yards, 1:40.
- MD – Marc Riley 10-yard run (pass failed), 5:10. Florida 56–23. Drive: 14 plays, 80 yards, 5:06.

Top passers

- FLA – Rex Grossman – 20/28, 248 yards, 3 TD
- MD – Shaun Hill – 23/39, 257 yards, INT

Top rushers

- FLA – Earnest Graham – 16 rushes, 149 yards, 2 TD
- MD – Shaun Hill – 11 rushes, 31 yards

Top receivers

- FLA – Taylor Jacobs – 10 receptions, 170 yards, 2 TD
- MD – Matt Murphy – 5 receptions, 42 yards

== Team players in the NFL ==
The following players were selected in the 2002 NFL draft.

Player	Position	Round	Overall	NFL team
Melvin Fowler	Center	3	76	Cleveland Browns
Charles Hill	Defensive tackle	3	83	Houston Texans
Matt Murphy	Tight end	7	252	Detroit Lions

Quarterback Shaun Hill was signed by the Minnesota Vikings as an undrafted free agent.
