= Alonzo Jackson =

American gridiron football player (born 1980)

No. 95, 59, 62
- Position: Defensive end

Personal information
- Born: September 15, 1980 (age 46); Americus, Georgia, U.S.
- Listed height: 6 ft 4 in (1.93 m)
- Listed weight: 268 lb (122 kg)

Career information
- High school: Americus
- College: Florida State
- NFL draft: 2003: 2nd round, 59th overall pick

Career history
- Pittsburgh Steelers (2003–2004); Philadelphia Eagles (2005); New York Giants (2005); New York Jets (2006)*; Calgary Stampeders (2007)*
- * Offseason or practice squad member only

Awards and highlights
- BCS national champion (1999); First-team All-ACC (2002)
- Stats at Pro Football Reference

Alonzo Jackson (born September 15, 1980) is an American former professional football player who was a defensive end for the Pittsburgh Steelers, New York Giants, and Philadelphia Eagles of the National Football League (NFL).

== Early life ==
A native of Americus, Georgia, Jackson attended Americus High School, where he was a standout defensive lineman. As a senior, he recorded 116 tackles, 16 sacks, and three blocked kicks, and was a first-team Class 2A all-state selection. Recruiting analyst Tom Lemming rated Jackson as the No. 110 player in the Southeast. He chose Florida State over Georgia and Florida.

== College career ==
In his true freshman season with the Seminoles, Jackson played in all 12 games and was credited with 13 total tackles, three solo tackles, and one pass break-up. In the National Championship game, the Sugar Bowl vs. Virginia Tech, Jackson contributed one solo tackle on special teams. As a sophomore, Jackson played in all 12 games (including four starts), serving primarily as back-up to senior David Warren at defensive end. He finished with 37 tackles (including 16 unassisted) on the season, and ranked fourth on the team with 5.0 quarterback sacks, behind Jamal Reynolds (12.0), David Warren (9.0), and Darnell Dockett (7.0). Jackson's season-best game came against Virginia, when he recorded six tackles, two tackles for loss, and one sack.

After Warren's graduation, Jackson took over the left defensive end spot, starting ten games. He missed the Miami (FL) and Virginia games with a sprained knee. Jackson led the team with five quarterback sacks and ranked second with 16 hurries. He also had eight tackles for loss, which tied Travis Johnson for second on the team, behind Darnell Dockett who posted a school-record 22 TFLs. Jackson finished the season with 33 total tackles (19 solo) and was named honorable mention All-ACC. He had five tackles and two tackles for loss in the Gator Bowl against Virginia Tech.

In his senior year, Jackson started all 14 games of the season, and registered team-highs in tackles for loss (18.5), sacks (13.0), and quarterback hurries (19). He also had 42 tackles (34 unassisted, sixth on the team), and forced four fumbles (team-high). Against Iowa State, he caught his only interception of the season, and returned it for 48 yards into the endzone.

== Professional career ==
=== Pre-draft ===
Pre-draft measurables
Height	Weight	Arm length	Hand span	40-yard dash	10-yard split	20-yard split	20-yard shuttle	Three-cone drill	Vertical jump	Broad jump	Bench press
6 ft 4 in (1.93 m)	266 lb (121 kg)	35 in (0.89 m)	9 1/4 in (0.23 m)	4.86 s	1.69 s	2.82 s	4.50 s	7.69 s	37 in (0.94 m)	9 ft 6 in (2.90 m)	14 reps
All values from NFL Combine.

Due to disappointing performances of Andre Wadsworth and Jamal Reynolds, the potential of “undersized Seminole ends” like Jackson was met with scepticism.

=== Pittsburgh Steelers ===
The Pittsburgh Steelers selected him in the second round of the 2003 NFL draft and he made the transition from defensive end to left outside linebacker in the 3–4 defense, projected as a long-term replacement for veteran Jason Gildon. He performed well during the preseason in both of his years with the Steelers, but only saw playing time on special teams. He played in two games in 2003 but recorded no statistics. He appeared in seven games in 2004, totaling five solo tackles and three assisted tackles. He was cut prior to the 2005 season on September 3, 2005.

=== Philadelphia Eagles ===
Jackson was signed to the practice squad of the Philadelphia Eagles on September 5, 2005. He was promoted to the active roster on October 8 and played in one game for the Eagles, accumulating two solo tackles. He was waived on October 11 and signed to the practice squad On October 17.

=== New York Giants ===
Jackson was signed by the New York Giants off of the Eagles' practice squad on October 26, 2005. He played in eight games, starting one, for the Giants in 2005, recording eight solo tackles and six assisted tackles.

=== New York Jets ===
Jackson signed with the New York Jets on June 15, 2006. He was waived on August 28, 2006.

=== Calgary Stampeders ===
Jackson was signed by the Calgary Stampeders of the Canadian Football League on April 26, 2007. He was released on June 18, 2007.
