= 2001 Duke Blue Devils football team =

American college football season

2001 Duke Blue Devils football
- Conference: Atlantic Coast Conference
- Record: 0–11 (0–8 ACC)
- Head coach: Carl Franks (3rd season)
- Offensive scheme: Fun and gun
- Defensive coordinator: Bob Trott (6th season)
- Base defense: 4–3
- MVP: Mike Hart
- Captains: Ben Erdeljac; Ronnie Hamilton; Mike Hart; Nate Krill
- Home stadium: Wallace Wade Stadium

2001 Atlantic Coast Conference football standings
	Conf.			Overall
Team	W		L	W		L
No. 11 Maryland $	7	–	1	10	–	2
No. 15 Florida State	6	–	2	8	–	4
North Carolina	5	–	3	8	–	5
Clemson	4	–	4	7	–	5
No. 24 Georgia Tech	4	–	4	8	–	5
NC State	4	–	4	7	–	5
Wake Forest	3	–	5	6	–	5
Virginia	3	–	5	5	–	7
Duke	0	–	8	0	–	11
$ – BCS representative as conference champion; Rankings from AP Poll

The 2001 Duke Blue Devils football team represented Duke University as a member of the Atlantic Coast Conference (ACC) during the 2001 NCAA Division I-A football season. Led by third-year head coach Carl Franks, the Blue Devils compiled an overall record of 0–11 with a mark of 0–8 in conference play, placing last out of nine teams in the ACC. The team played home games at Wallace Wade Stadium in Durham, North Carolina.

Duke went winless for the second consecutive season.

== Schedule ==
Date	Time	Opponent	Site	TV	Result	Attendance
September 1	6:00 pm	No. 6 Florida State	Wallace Wade Stadium; Durham, NC	PPV	L 13–55	23,312
September 8	8:00 pm	at Rice*	Rice Stadium; Houston, TX		L 13–15	17,745
September 22	6:00 pm	No. 16 Northwestern*	Wallace Wade Stadium; Durham, NC		L 7–44	18,427
September 29	1:00 pm	at Virginia	Scott Stadium; Charlottesville, VA		L 10–31	54,653
October 6	1:00 pm	No. 17 Georgia Tech^{†}	Wallace Wade Stadium; Durham, NC		L 10–37	10,431
October 13	1:00 pm	Wake Forest	Wallace Wade Stadium; Durham, NC (rivalry)		L 35–42	10,835
October 20	1:00 pm	at No. 12 Maryland	Byrd Stadium; College Park, MD	JPS	L 17–59	43,528
October 27	1:00 pm	Vanderbilt*	Wallace Wade Stadium; Durham, NC		L 28–42	18,332
November 3	1:00 pm	NC State	Wallace Wade Stadium; Durham, NC (rivalry)		L 31–55	35,206
November 17	1:30 pm	at North Carolina	Kenan Memorial Stadium; Chapel Hill, NC (Victory Bell)		L 17–52	52,000
December 1	1:00 pm	at Clemson	Memorial Stadium; Clemson, SC		L 31–59	72,577
*Non-conference game; ^{†}Homecoming; Rankings from AP Poll released prior to the game; All times are in Eastern time
