= 2001 Florida State Seminoles football team =

American college football season

2001 Florida State Seminoles football

Gator Bowl champion

Gator Bowl, W 30–17 vs. Virginia Tech
- Conference: Atlantic Coast Conference

Ranking
- Coaches: No. 15
- AP: No. 15
- Record: 8–4 (6–2 ACC)
- Head coach: Bobby Bowden (26th season)
- Offensive coordinator: Jeff Bowden (1st season)
- Offensive scheme: Pro-style
- Defensive coordinator: Mickey Andrews (18th season)
- Base defense: 4–3
- Captains: Javon Walker; Chad Maeder; Bradley Jennings
- Home stadium: Doak Campbell Stadium

2001 Atlantic Coast Conference football standings
| | Conf. | | | Overall |
| Team | W | | L | W | | L |
|---|---|---|---|---|---|---|
| No. 11 Maryland $ | 7 | – | 1 | 10 | – | 2 |
| No. 15 Florida State | 6 | – | 2 | 8 | – | 4 |
| North Carolina | 5 | – | 3 | 8 | – | 5 |
| Clemson | 4 | – | 4 | 7 | – | 5 |
| No. 24 Georgia Tech | 4 | – | 4 | 8 | – | 5 |
| NC State | 4 | – | 4 | 7 | – | 5 |
| Wake Forest | 3 | – | 5 | 6 | – | 5 |
| Virginia | 3 | – | 5 | 5 | – | 7 |
| Duke | 0 | – | 8 | 0 | – | 11 |
$ – BCS representative as conference champion; Rankings from AP Poll

The 2001 Florida State Seminoles football team represented the Florida State University as a member of the Atlantic Coast Conference (ACC) during the 2001 NCAA Division I-A football season. Led by 26th-year head coach Bobby Bowden, the Seminoles compiled an overall record of 8–4 with a mark of 6–2 in conference play, placing second in the ACC. Florida State was invited to the Gator Bowl, where the Seminoles defeated Virginia Tech. The team played home games at Doak Campbell Stadium in Tallahassee, Florida.

== Schedule ==
| Date | Time | Opponent | Rank | Site | TV | Result | Attendance | Source |
|---|---|---|---|---|---|---|---|---|
| September 1 | 6:00 p.m. | at Duke | No. 6 | Wallace Wade Stadium; Durham, NC | PPV | W 55–13 | 23,312 | |
| September 8 | 5:30 p.m. | UAB* | No. 6 | Doak Campbell Stadium; Tallahassee, FL | ESPN2 | W 29–7 | 79,388 | |
| September 22 | 12:00 p.m. | at North Carolina | No. 6 | Kenan Memorial Stadium; Chapel Hill, NC | ABC | L 9–41 | 53,000 | |
| September 29 | 7:00 p.m. | Wake Forest | No. 18 | Doak Campbell Stadium; Tallahassee, FL | PPV | W 48–24 | 79,162 | |
| October 13 | 12:00 p.m. | No. 2 Miami (FL)* | No. 14 | Doak Campbell Stadium; Tallahassee, FL (rivalry, College GameDay) | ABC | L 27–49 | 82,836 | |
| October 20 | 7:45 p.m. | at Virginia | No. 21 | Scott Stadium; Charlottesville, VA (Jefferson-Eppes Trophy) | ESPN | W 43–7 | 61,383 | |
| October 27 | 3:30 p.m. | No. 10 Maryland | No. 19 | Doak Campbell Stadium; Tallahassee, FL | ABC | W 52–31 | 82,565 | |
| November 3 | 3:30 p.m. | at Clemson | No. 14 | Memorial Stadium; Clemson, SC (rivalry) | ABC | W 41–27 | 85,036 | |
| November 10 | 3:30 p.m. | NC State^{†} | No. 10 | Doak Campbell Stadium; Tallahassee, FL | ABC | L 28–34 | 82,425 | |
| November 17 | 8:00 p.m. | at No. 4 Florida* | No. 21 | Ben Hill Griffin Stadium; Gainesville, FL (rivalry) | CBS | L 13–37 | 85,732 | |
| December 1 | 3:30 p.m. | Georgia Tech | | Doak Campbell Stadium; Tallahassee, FL | ESPN | W 28–17 | 82,269 | |
| January 1 | 12:00 p.m. | vs. No. 15 Virginia Tech* | No. 24 | Alltel Stadium; Jacksonville, FL (Gator Bowl) | NBC | W 30–17 | 72,202 | |
*Non-conference game; ^{†}Homecoming; Rankings from AP Poll released prior to the game; All times are in Eastern time

== Game summaries ==
=== Miami (FL) ===
Miami (FL) at Florida State

| Team | 1 | 2 | 3 | 4 | Total |
|---|---|---|---|---|---|
| • No. 2 Hurricanes | 14 | 7 | 28 | 0 | 49 |
| No. 13 Seminoles | 0 | 13 | 7 | 7 | 27 |

- Date: October 13
- Location: Doak Campbell Stadium, Tallahassee, FL
- Game start: 12:00 EDT
- Game attendance: 82,836
- TV announcers (ABC): Brad Nessler, Bob Griese, Lynn Swann

Scoring summary
| 1 | 8:48 | MIA | Fitzgerald 5-yard blocked punt return (Sievers kick) | MIA 7–0 |
| 1 | 7:16 | MIA | Andre Johnson 27-yard pass from Ken Dorsey (Sievers kick) | MIA 14–0 |
| 2 | 11:03 | MIA | Jeremy Shockey 1-yard pass from Dorsey (Sievers kick) | MIA 21–0 |
| 2 | 6:50 | FSU | Jones 6-yard run (kick failed) | MIA 21–6 |
| 2 | 0:05 | FSU | McCray 1-yard run (Beitia kick) | MIA 21–13 |
| 3 | 13:23 | MIA | A. Johnson 18-yard pass from Dorsey (Sievers kick) | MIA 28–13 |
| 3 | 12:18 | MIA | Jonathan Vilma 36-yard fumble return (Sievers kick) | MIA 35–13 |
| 3 | 9:56 | FSU | Gardner 57-yard pass from Chris Rix (Beitia kick) | MIA 35–20 |
| 3 | 4:48 | MIA | Capshaw 7-yard run (Sievers kick) | MIA 42–20 |
| 3 | 3:54 | MIA | Willis McGahee 8-yard run (Sievers kick) | MIA 49–20 |
| 4 | 6:53 | FSU | Michael Boulware 73-yard fumble return (Beitia kick) | MIA 49–27 |

=== NC State ===
NC State at Florida State

| Team | 1 | 2 | 3 | 4 | Total |
|---|---|---|---|---|---|
| • Wolfpack | 7 | 17 | 0 | 10 | 34 |
| No. 10 Seminoles | 14 | 0 | 7 | 7 | 28 |

- Date: November 10
- Location: Doak Campbell Stadium, Tallahassee, FL
- Game start: 3:35 pm EDT
- Elapsed time: 3:17
- Game attendance: 82,425
- Game weather: 79 °F (26 °C), Mostly sunny, Wind SE 4 mph (6.4 km/h)
- Referee: C. Mauzy
- TV announcers (ABC): Terry Gannon, Mike Mayock

Scoring summary
| 1 | 12:50 | NCST | D. Green fumble recovery in end zone (Kiker kick) | NCST 7–0 |
| 1 | 9:26 | FSU | T. Gardner 33-yard pass from C. Rix (Beitia kick) | Tied 7–7 |
| 1 | 0:59 | FSU | J. Walker 63-yard pass from C. Rix (Beitia kick) | FSU 14–7 |
| 2 | 14:14 | NCST | J. Cotchery 12-yard run (Kiker kick) | Tied 14–14 |
| 2 | 9:04 | NCST | R. Robinson 3-yard run (Kiker kick) | NCST 21–14 |
| 2 | 0:12 | NCST | A. Kiker 20-yard field goal | NCST 24–14 |
| 3 | 7:31 | FSU | T. Gardner 22-yard pass from C. Rix (Beitia kick) | NCST 24–21 |
| 4 | 11:37 | NCST | R. Robinson 24-yard run (Kiker kick) | NCST 31–21 |
| 4 | 10:05 | FSU | C. Rix 3-yard run (Beitia kick) | NCST 31–28 |
| 4 | 2:11 | NCST | A. Kiker 32-yard field goal | NCST 34–28 |

=== Gator Bowl ===
Virginia Tech vs. Florida State

| Team | 1 | 2 | 3 | 4 | Total |
|---|---|---|---|---|---|
| No. 15 Hokies | 3 | 0 | 14 | 0 | 17 |
| • No. 24 Seminoles | 0 | 10 | 3 | 17 | 30 |

- Date: January 1
- Location: Alltel Stadium, Jacksonville, FL
- Game attendance: 72,202
- Referee: David Witvoet
- TV announcers (NBC): Tom Hammond, Pat Haden, and Chris Wragge

Scoring summary
| 1 | 10:56 | VT | Carter Warley 36-yard field goal | VT 3–0 |
| 2 | 6:32 | FSU | Chris Rix 1-yard run (Xavier Beitia kick) | FSU 7–3 |
| 2 | 1:27 | FSU | Xavier Beitia 50-yard field goal | FSU 10–3 |
| 3 | 10:02 | VT | Kevin Jones 5-yard run (Warley kick) | Tied 10–10 |
| 3 | 1:42 | FSU | Xavier Beitia 47-yard field goal | FSU 13–10 |
| 3 | 0:40 | VT | Andre Davis 55-yard pass from Grant Noel (Warley kick) | VT 17–13 |
| 4 | 14:48 | FSU | Javon Walker 77-yard pass from Chris Rix (Beitia kick) | FSU 20–17 |
| 4 | 10:13 | FSU | Xavier Beitia 35-yard field goal | FSU 23–17 |
| 4 | 2:14 | FSU | Walker 23-yard pass from Rix (Beitia kick) | FSU 30–17 |

== Roster ==
2001 Florida State Seminoles football team roster
Players
Coaches
Offense

| Pos. | # | Name | Class |
|---|---|---|---|
| WR | 4 | Anquan Boldin | Jr |
| QB | 16 | Chris Rix | Fr |
| WR | 81 | P. K. Sam | Fr |
| WR | 86 | Jason Howard | Fr |
| WR | 80 | Javon Walker | Sr |

Defense

| Pos. | # | Name | Class |
|---|---|---|---|
| FS | 28 | Chris Hope | Sr |
| DE | 48 | Alonzo Jackson | Jr |

Special teams

| Pos. | # | Name | Class |
|---|---|---|---|
| K | 47 | Xavier Beitia | Fr |

Head coach

- Bobby Bowden

Coordinators/assistant coaches

Legend

- (C) Team captain
- (S) Suspended
- (I) Ineligible
- Injured
- Redshirt

Roster
Last update: 2001-12-17
