= 2001 Humanitarian Bowl =

2001 Crucial.com Humanitarian Bowl
Clemson Tigers	Louisiana Tech Bulldogs
(6–5)	(7–4)
ACC	WAC
49	24
Head coach: Tommy Bowden	Head coach: Jack Bicknell
	1	2	3	4	Total
Clemson	7	7	28	7	49
Louisiana Tech	3	7	0	14	24
- Date: December 31, 2001
- Season: 2001
- Stadium: Bronco Stadium
- Location: Boise, Idaho
- Referee: Gordon Riese (Pac-10)
- Attendance: 25,364
- Payout: US$750,000 per team

United States TV coverage
- Network: ESPN
- Announcers: Jim Kelly, J. C. Pearson, Heather Cox

The 2001 Humanitarian Bowl was the fifth edition of the bowl game. It featured the Clemson Tigers versus the Louisiana Tech Bulldogs.

== Background ==
This was the Bulldogs first bowl game since the 1990 tie in the Independence Bowl. They were looking to win a bowl game for the first time since 1977. They had won the Western Athletic Conference championship (in their first season there), which was their first conference championship since they won the Southland Conference in 1984. This was Clemson third consecutive bowl game and seventh in 10 seasons. They were looking to win a bowl game for the first time since the 1993 Peach Bowl. They had finished fourth in the Atlantic Coast Conference.

== Game summary ==
Louisiana Tech scored first on a 29-yard field goal from placekicker Josh Scobee, giving the Bulldogs a 3–0 lead. Later in the first quarter, Woodrow Dantzler threw a 10-yard touchdown pass to Matt Bailey, as the Tigers took a 7–3 lead into the second quarter.

In the second quarter, Luke McCown scored on an 11-yard touchdown run giving Louisiana Tech a 10–7 lead. Woodrow Dantzler threw a 53-yard touchdown pass to Roscoe Crosby giving Clemson a 14–10 lead. They would keep that lead through halftime.

In the third quarter, Dantzler threw a 5–yard touchdown pass to Ben Hall, increasing the Tigers lead to 21–10. Dantzler's fourth touchdown pass, a 62-yarder to Bernard Rambert gave the Tigers a 28–10 lead. Bernard Rambert scored on a 21-yard touchdown run to make it 35–10. Airese Currie added a 19-yard touchdown run, as the Tigers clawed to a 42–10 led at the end of three quarters.

In the fourth quarter, backup quarterback Willie Simmons threw a 57-yard touchdown pass to Derrick Hamilton, making the lead 49–10. Louisiana Tech would score on a 34-yard touchdown pass from McCown to Delwyn Daigre to cut the lead to 49–18. They scored once more on a 2-yard Joe Smith run, making the final margin 49–24, winning their first bowl game since 1993.

=== Scoring summary ===
Scoring summary

Quarter	Time	Drive			Team	Scoring information	Score	
Quarter	Time	Plays	Yards	TOP	Team	Scoring information	Clemson	La. Tech
1	12:22	10	61	2:38	La. Tech	29-yard field goal by Josh Scobee	0	3
1	5:48	8	51	3:25	Clemson	Matt Bailey 10-yard touchdown reception from Woodrow Dantzler, Aaron Hunt kick good	7	3
2	7:51	12	79	4:05	La. Tech	Luke McCown 11-yard touchdown run, Josh Scobee kick good	7	10
2	6:54	2	57	0:57	Clemson	Roscoe Crosby 53-yard touchdown reception from Woodrow Dantzler, Aaron Hunt kick good	14	10
3	11:43	9	65	3:17	Clemson	Ben Hall 5-yard touchdown reception from Woodrow Dantzler, Aaron Hunt kick good	21	10
3	9:42	3	62	0:30	Clemson	Bernard Rambert 62-yard touchdown reception from Woodrow Dantzler, Aaron Hunt kick good	28	10
3	6:36	7	58	1:25	Clemson	Bernard Rambert 21-yard touchdown run, Aaron Hunt kick good	35	10
3	4:34	6	51	1:46	Clemson	Airese Currie 19-yard touchdown run, Aaron Hunt kick good	42	10
4	9:24	2	60	0:52	Clemson	Derrick Hamilton 57-yard touchdown reception from Willie Simmons, Aaron Hunt kick good	49	10
4	7:46	7	76	1:38	La. Tech	Delwyn Daigre 34-yard touchdown reception from Luke McCown, 2-point pass good	49	18
4	3:14	8	75	1:00	La. Tech	Joe Smith 2-yard touchdown run, 2-point pass failed	49	24
"TOP" = time of possession. For other American football terms, see Glossary of American football.							49	24

=== Statistics ===
	1	2	3	4	Total
Tigers	7	7	28	7	49
Bulldogs	3	7	0	14	24

Statistics	Clemson	La. Tech
First downs	28	25
Total offense, yards	548	450
Rushes-yards (net)	55–273	26–49
Passing yards (net)	275	401
Passes, Comp-Att-Int	16–29–1	29–59–3
Time of Possession	31:03	28:57

Team	Category	Player	Statistics
Clemson	Passing	Woodrow Dantzler	15/23, 218 yds, 4 TD
Clemson	Rushing	Bernard Rambert	16 car, 101 yds, 1 TD
Clemson	Receiving	Derrick Hamilton	4 rec, 94 yds, 1 TD
La. Tech	Passing	Luke McCown	25/52, 328 yds, 1 TD, 3 INT
La. Tech	Rushing	Joe Smith	14 car, 57 yds, 1 TD
La. Tech	Receiving	Delwyn Daigre	10 rec, 178 yds
