= 2001 Syracuse Orangemen football team =

American college football season

2001 Syracuse Orangemen football

Insight.com Bowl champion

Insight.com Bowl, W 26–3 vs. Kansas State
- Conference: Big East Conference

Ranking
- Coaches: No. 14
- AP: No. 14
- Record: 10–3 (6–1 Big East)
- Head coach: Paul Pasqualoni (11th season)
- Offensive coordinator: George DeLeone (13th season)
- Defensive coordinator: Chris Rippon (3rd season)
- Captains: P. J. Alexander; Dwight Freeney; Quentin Harris; Kyle Johnson; Graham Manley
- Home stadium: Carrier Dome

2001 Big East Conference football standings
	Conf.			Overall
Team	W		L	W		L
No. 1 Miami (FL) $#	7	–	0	12	–	0
No. 14 Syracuse	6	–	1	10	–	3
No. 18 Virginia Tech	4	–	3	8	–	4
No. 21 Boston College	4	–	3	8	–	4
Pittsburgh	4	–	3	7	–	5
Temple	2	–	5	4	–	7
West Virginia	1	–	6	3	–	8
Rutgers	0	–	7	2	–	9
# – BCS National Champion; $ – BCS representative as conference champion; Rankings from AP Poll

The 2001 Syracuse Orangemen football team represented Syracuse University as a member of the Big East Conference during the 2001 NCAA Division I-A football season. Led by 11th-year head coach Paul Pasqualoni, the Orangemen compiled an overall record of 10–3 with a mark of 6–1 in conference play, placing second in the Big East. Syracuse was invited to the Insight.com Bowl, where the Orangemen defeated Kansas State. The team played home games at the Carrier Dome in Syracuse, New York.

== Schedule ==
Date	Time	Opponent	Rank	Site	TV	Result	Attendance	Source
August 26	2:00 pm	vs. No. 10 Georgia Tech*		Giants Stadium; East Rutherford, NJ (Kickoff Classic)	ABC	L 7–13	41,517	
September 1	4:00 pm	at No. 8 Tennessee*		Neyland Stadium; Knoxville, TN	ESPN2	L 9–33	107,725	
September 8	12:00 pm	UCF*		Carrier Dome; Syracuse, NY	ESPN Plus	W 21–10	35,938	
September 22	7:45 pm	Auburn*		Carrier Dome; Syracuse, NY	ESPN	W 31–14	43,403	
September 29	1:30 pm	East Carolina*		Carrier Dome; Syracuse, NY		W 44–30	36,347	
October 6	12:00 pm	at Rutgers		Rutgers Stadium; Piscataway, NJ	ESPN Plus	W 24–17	17,511	
October 13	12:00 pm	at Pittsburgh		Heinz Field; Pittsburgh, PA (rivalry)	ESPN Plus	W 42–10	52,367	
October 20	1:30 pm	Temple^{†}		Carrier Dome; Syracuse, NY		W 45–3	42,115	
October 27	12:00 pm	at No. 5 Virginia Tech		Lane Stadium; Blacksburg, VA	ESPN Plus	W 22–14	53,662	
November 10	12:00 pm	West Virginia	No. 18	Carrier Dome; Syracuse, NY (rivalry)	ESPN Plus	W 24–13	43,753	
November 17	3:30 pm	at No. 1 Miami	No. 14	Miami Orange Bowl; Miami, FL (College GameDay)	ABC	L 0–59	52,896	
November 24	7:00 pm	No. 25 Boston College	No. 22	Carrier Dome; Syracuse, NY	ESPN2	W 39–28	45,063	
December 29	5:30 pm	vs. Kansas State*	No. 18	Bank One Ballpark; Phoenix, AZ (Insight.com Bowl)	ESPN	W 26–3	40,028	
*Non-conference game; ^{†}Homecoming; Rankings from AP Poll released prior to the game; All times are in Eastern time

== Roster ==
2001 Syracuse Orange football team roster
Players
Coaches
Offense

Pos.	#	Name	Class
WR	1	Maurice Jackson	Sr
WR	2	Johnnie Morant	So
QB	5	R.J. Anderson	So
QB	7	Cecil Howard	Fr
WR	10	Malik Campbell	Sr
QB	11	Troy Nunes	Jr
WR	12	Jared Jones	Fr
QB	13	Joseph Hafera	Fr
WR	14	Jamel Riddle	So
WR	16	Xzavier Gaines	Fr
RB	22	Diamond Ferri	So
RB	23	James Mungro	Sr
RB	27	Barry Baker	Jr
FB	32	Kyle Johnson	Sr
FB	34	Chris Davis	Jr
TE	35	Greg Hanoian	Fr
FB	38	George Scott	Jr
RB	39	Walter Reyes	Fr
TE	40	Joe Donnelly	So
TE	41	Lenny Cusamano	So
FB	43	Keith Belton	So
C	61	Nick Romeo	So
G	62	Brent Caldwell	Fr
G	65	Joseph Burton	Sr
OT	67	Brad Leyenaar	Fr
C	68	Chris Buda	So
OT	69	P. J. Alexander	Sr
OT	70	Jeremy McCorkle	Fr
OT	71	Giovanni DeLoatch	Sr
G	72	Jason Greene	Fr
G	73	Erik Kaloyanides	Jr
OT	74	Kevin Sampson	So
G	75	Matt Tarullo	Fr
G	76	Sean O'Connor	Sr
G	77	Tim Carignan	Fr
OT	78	Adam Terry	Jr
OT	79	Jared Pierce	Fr
WR	80	Andre Fontenette	Fr
WR	81	David Tyree	Jr
WR	82	Kwazi Leverette	Sr
TE	83	Alex Shor	Fr
WR	85	Elvis Torres	Sr
RB	86	Harold Jean-Louis	So
TE	87	David Hohensee	Sr
TE	88	Jeremie Frasier	Sr
TE	89	Graham Hohensee	Sr
G	95	Charles Simpson	So

Defense

Pos.	#	Name	Class
CB	3	Latroy Oliver	Jr
FS	4	Quentin Harris	Sr
FS	6	Maurice McClain	Jr
CB	8	Andre Brinson	Sr
CB	9	Clifton Smith	Jr
CB	15	Willie Ford	Sr
CB	15	Modibo Sidibe	So
CB	17	William Darnell	Jr
SS	18	Troy Swittenburg	Fr
FS	21	O'Neil Scott	Fr
CB	24	Jeremiah Mason	Fr
CB	25	Steve Gregory	Fr
LB	26	Maurice Minter	Sr
SS	28	Keeon Walker	Jr
CB	29	Thomas Whitfield	Fr
CB	30	Will Hunter	Sr
LB	31	Kellen Pruitt	Fr
SS	33	Cedric Edmonds	Fr
LB	37	Charles Burton	Sr
LB	42	Rodney Wells	Sr
LB	45	J.R. Johnson	Sr
LB	46	Cory Brooks	Fr
DE	48	Sheldon King	Sr
DE	49	Billy Wilson	Fr
LB	50	Jameel Dumas	So
LB	51	Gerald Hall	Jr
LB	52	Jose Harris	Jr
DL	53	Mark Holtzman	Sr
DE	54	Dwight Freeney	Sr
LB	55	Joseph Kowalewski	Fr
DE	56	Julian Pollard	Fr
LB	57	Rich Scanlon	So
LB	58	James Dumervil	Fr
DE	90	James Wyche	Fr
DE	91	Eugene Brown	Fr
DE	92	Tommy Harris	Fr
DT	93	Christian Ferrara	So
DE	94	Ryan LaCasse	Fr
DT	96	Brian Hooper	Fr
DE	97	Josh Thomas	So
DT	99	Louis Gachelin	So

Special teams

Pos.	#	Name	Class
K	19	Collin Barber	Fr
K/P	20	Justin Sujansky	Fr
K/P	36	Mike Shafer	Jr
K	47	Brandon Bowman	Sr
K	84	Ben Kozik	Sr

Head coach

- Paul Pasqualoni

Coordinators/assistant coaches

- Jerry Azzinaro (defensive line / recruiting coordinator)

Legend

- (C) Team captain
- (S) Suspended
- (I) Ineligible
- Injured
- Redshirt

Roster
