= 2001 Insight.com Bowl =

- 13th Insight.com Bowl
Syracuse Orangemen	Kansas State Wildcats
(9–3)	(6–5)
Big East	Big 12
26	3
Head coach: Paul Pasqualoni	Head coach: Bill Snyder
AP / Coaches; 18 / 18
	1	2	3	4	Total
Syracuse	7	12	0	7	26
Kansas State	3	0	0	0	3
- Date: December 29, 2001
- Season: 2001
- Stadium: Bank One Ballpark
- Location: Phoenix, Arizona
- MVP: James Mungro (RB, Syracuse) & Clifton Smith (LB, Syracuse)
- Attendance: 40,028

United States TV coverage
- Network: ESPN
- Announcers: Steve Levy, Todd Christensen, and Dave Ryan

The 2001 Insight.com Bowl was the 13th edition of the Insight.com Bowl. It featured the Syracuse Orangemen, and the Kansas State Wildcats, and it was a rematch of the 1997 Fiesta Bowl, played in nearby Tempe.

== Game summary ==
Syracuse opened the scoring on a 65-yard touchdown run by running back James Mungro making it 7–0 Syracuse. Kansas State's Joe Rheem kicked a 29–yard field goal to pull KSU to 7–3, closing the first quarter scoring. In the second quarter, James Mungro scored on a pair of 1-yard touchdown runs, but on both occasions the extra point fell short, as Syracuse led 19–3. After a scoreless third quarter, backup quarterback RJ Anderson fired a 52-yard touchdown pass to Johnnie Morant making the final score 26–3.
