= 2001 North Carolina Tar Heels football team =

American college football season

2001 North Carolina Tar Heels football

Peach Bowl champion

Peach Bowl, W 16–10 vs. Auburn
- Conference: Atlantic Coast Conference
- Record: 8–5 (5–3 ACC)
- Head coach: John Bunting (1st season)
- Offensive coordinator: Gary Tranquill (1st season)
- Offensive scheme: Pro-style
- Defensive coordinator: Jon Tenuta (1st season)
- Base defense: 4–3
- Captains: Ronald Curry; Quincy Monk; Jeff Reed
- Home stadium: Kenan Memorial Stadium

2001 Atlantic Coast Conference football standings
	Conf.			Overall
Team	W		L	W		L
No. 11 Maryland $	7	–	1	10	–	2
No. 15 Florida State	6	–	2	8	–	4
North Carolina	5	–	3	8	–	5
Clemson	4	–	4	7	–	5
No. 24 Georgia Tech	4	–	4	8	–	5
NC State	4	–	4	7	–	5
Wake Forest	3	–	5	6	–	5
Virginia	3	–	5	5	–	7
Duke	0	–	8	0	–	11
$ – BCS representative as conference champion; Rankings from AP Poll

The 2001 North Carolina Tar Heels football team represented the University of North Carolina at Chapel Hill as a member of the Atlantic Coast Conference (ACC) during the 2001 NCAA Division I-A football season. Led by first-year head coach John Bunting, the Tar Heels played their home games at Kenan Memorial Stadium in Chapel Hill, North Carolina. North Carolina finished the season 8–5 overall and 5–3 in ACC play to place third. They beat Auburn in the Peach Bowl.

== Schedule ==
Date	Time	Opponent	Rank	Site	TV	Result	Attendance	Source
August 25	7:45 p.m.	at No. 3 Oklahoma*		Oklahoma Memorial Stadium; Norman, OK (Hispanic College Fund Football Classic)	ESPN	L 27–41	75,423	
September 1	12:00 p.m.	at Maryland		Byrd Stadium; College Park, MD	ABC	L 7–23	44,080	
September 8	12:00 p.m.	at No. 4 Texas*		Darrell K Royal–Texas Memorial Stadium; Austin, TX	ABC	L 14–44	83,106	
September 22	12:00 p.m.	No. 6 Florida State		Kenan Memorial Stadium; Chapel Hill, NC	ABC	W 41–9	53,000	
September 29	12:00 p.m.	at NC State		Carter–Finley Stadium; Raleigh, NC (rivalry)	JPS	W 17–9	51,500	
October 6	3:30 p.m.	East Carolina*^{†}		Kenan Memorial Stadium; Chapel Hill, NC	ESPN+	W 24–21	58,500	
October 13	1:30 p.m.	Virginia		Kenan Memorial Stadium; Chapel Hill, NC (South's Oldest Rivalry)		W 30–24	53,500	
October 20	12:00 p.m.	at No. 13 Clemson		Memorial Stadium; Clemson, SC	ESPN2	W 38–3	84,800	
November 1	7:30 p.m.	at No. 23 Georgia Tech	No. 22	Bobby Dodd Stadium; Atlanta, GA	ESPN	L 21–28	41,893	
November 10	12:00 p.m.	Wake Forest		Kenan Memorial Stadium; Chapel Hill, NC (rivalry)	JPS	L 31–32	53,000	
November 17	1:30 p.m.	Duke		Kenan Memorial Stadium; Chapel Hill, NC (Victory Bell)		W 52–17	52,000	
December 1	1:30 p.m.	SMU*		Kenan Memorial Stadium; Chapel Hill, NC		W 19–10	45,500	
December 31	7:30 p.m.	vs. Auburn*		Georgia Dome; Atlanta, GA (Peach Bowl)	ESPN	W 16–10	71,827	
*Non-conference game; ^{†}Homecoming; Rankings from AP Poll released prior to the game; All times are in Eastern time

== Roster ==
2001 North Carolina Tar Heels football team roster
Players
Coaches
Offense

Pos.	#	Name	Class
WR	88	Sam Aiken	Jr
QB	1	Ronald Curry	Sr
QB	11	Darian Durant	Fr
RB	15	Willie Parker	So

Defense

Pos.	#	Name	Class
LB	41	Quincy Monk	Sr
DE	49	Julius Peppers	Jr
DT	87	Ryan Sims	Sr
LB	30	David Thornton	Sr

Special teams

Pos.	#	Name	Class
K	45	Jeff Reed	Sr

Head coach

- John Bunting

Coordinators/assistant coaches

- Rod Broadway
  Defensive line

Legend

- (C) Team captain
- (S) Suspended
- (I) Ineligible
- Injured
- Redshirt

Roster

== Coaching staff ==
Name	Position	Seasons in Position
John Bunting	Head coach	1st
Gunter Brewer	Wide Receivers	2nd
Rod Broadway	Defensive tackles	1st
Ken Browning	Tight Ends / recruiting coordinator	8th
Jeff Connors	Strength and conditioning coordinator	1st
John Tenuta	Defensive Backs / defensive coordinator	1st
Robbie Caldwell	Offensive Line	2nd
Dave Huxtable	Linebackers	1st
Andre' Powell	Running backs	1st
Gary Tranquill	Offensive coordinator / quarterbacks	1st
James Webster, Jr.	Defensive ends	1st

== Game summaries ==
=== at No. 3 Oklahoma ===
North Carolina Tar Heels at No. 3 Oklahoma Sooners

Team	1	2	3	4	Total
Tar Heels	7	7	0	13	27
• No. 3 Sooners	31	10	0	0	41

- Date: August 25
- Location: Oklahoma Memorial Stadium, Norman, Oklahoma
- Game attendance: 75,423
- TV announcers (ESPN): Ron Franklin (Play–by–play), Mike Gottfried (Color), & Adrian Karsten (Sideline)

=== at Maryland ===
North Carolina at Maryland

Team	1	2	3	4	Total
Tar Heels	7	0	0	0	7
• Terrapins	7	2	0	14	23

- Date: September 1
- Location: Byrd Stadium, College Park, MD
- Game start: 12:10 pm EDT
- Elapsed time: 2:50
- Game attendance: 44,080
- Referee: Jack Childress
- TV announcers (ABC): Mike Tirico, David Norrie

Scoring summary
1	13:12	UNC	Willie Parker 77-yard run (J. Reed kick)	UNC 7–0
1	6:33	MD	J. Williams 20-yard pass from S. Hill (N. Novak kick)	Tied 7–7
2	11:43	MD	Safety, T. Stewart	MD 9–7
4	13:19	MD	S. Monroe 5-yard pass from S. Hill (N. Novak kick)	MD 16–7
4	6:35	MD	M. Riley 1-yard run (N. Novak kick)	MD 23–7

== Team players drafted in the NFL ==
The following players were selected in the 2002 NFL draft.

Player	Position	Round	Pick	Franchise
Julius Peppers	Defensive end	1	2	Carolina Panthers
Ryan Sims	Defensive tackle	1	6	Kansas City Chiefs
David Thornton	Linebacker	4	106	Indianapolis Colts
Joey Evans	Defensive end	7	219	Cincinnati Bengals
Ronald Curry	Wide receiver	7	235	Oakland Raiders
Quincy Monk	Linebacker	7	245	New York Giants
