= 2001 Wake Forest Demon Deacons football team =

American college football season

2001 Wake Forest Demon Deacons football
- Conference: Atlantic Coast Conference
- Record: 6–5 (3–5 ACC)
- Head coach: Jim Grobe (1st season)
- Offensive coordinator: Troy Calhoun (1st season)
- Offensive scheme: Multiple
- Defensive coordinator: Dean Hood (1st season)
- Base defense: 4–3
- Captain: Game captains
- Home stadium: Groves Stadium

2001 Atlantic Coast Conference football standings
	Conf.			Overall
Team	W		L	W		L
No. 11 Maryland $	7	–	1	10	–	2
No. 15 Florida State	6	–	2	8	–	4
North Carolina	5	–	3	8	–	5
Clemson	4	–	4	7	–	5
No. 24 Georgia Tech	4	–	4	8	–	5
NC State	4	–	4	7	–	5
Wake Forest	3	–	5	6	–	5
Virginia	3	–	5	5	–	7
Duke	0	–	8	0	–	11
$ – BCS representative as conference champion; Rankings from AP Poll

The 2001 Wake Forest Demon Deacons football team was an American football team that represented Wake Forest University during the 2001 NCAA Division I-A football season. In their first season under head coach Jim Grobe, the Demon Deacons compiled a 6–5 record and finished in a tie for seventh place in the Atlantic Coast Conference. Notably, the team ended a 17-game losing streak against conference opponent Virginia.

The team's statistical leaders included James MacPherson (1,555 passing yards), Tarence Williams (1,018 rushing yards), Jason Anderson (472 receiving yards), and Tyler Ashe (66 points scored, 33 extra points, 11 field goals).

The team played its home games at Groves Stadium in Winston-Salem, North Carolina.

== Schedule ==
Date	Time	Opponent	Site	TV	Result	Attendance	Source
September 1	7:00 pm	at East Carolina*	Dowdy–Ficklen Stadium; Greenville, NC		W 21–19	36,794	
September 8	6:30 pm	Appalachian State*	Groves Stadium; Winston-Salem, NC		W 20–10	29,127	
September 22	3:30 pm	Maryland	Groves Stadium; Winston-Salem, NC		L 20–27	22,372	
September 29	7:00 pm	at Florida State	Doak Campbell Stadium; Tallahassee, FL	PPV	L 24–48	79,162	
October 6	6:30 pm	NC State	Groves Stadium; Winston-Salem, NC (rivalry)		L 14–17	27,401	
October 13	1:00 pm	at Duke	Wallace Wade Stadium; Durham, NC (rivalry)		W 42–35	10,835	
October 27	12:00 pm	Clemson^{†}	Groves Stadium; Winston-Salem, NC	JPS	L 14–21	21,290	
November 3	12:00 pm	at Virginia	Scott Stadium; Charlottesville, VA	JPS	W 34–30	50,228	
November 10	12:00 pm	at North Carolina	Kenan Memorial Stadium; Chapel Hill, NC (rivalry)	JPS	W 32–31	53,000	
November 17	12:00 pm	Georgia Tech	Groves Stadium; Winston-Salem, NC	JPS	L 33–38	24,263	
November 24	1:00 pm	Northern Illinois*	Groves Stadium; Winston-Salem, NC		W 38–35	14,100	
*Non-conference game; ^{†}Homecoming; All times are in Eastern time

== Team leaders ==
Category	Team Leader	Att/Cth	Yds
Passing	James MacPherson	113/209	1,555
Rushing	Tarence Williams	249	1,018
Receiving	Jason Anderson	28	472
