= 2001 Peach Bowl =

American college football game

2001 Chick-fil-A Peach Bowl
- 34th Peach Bowl
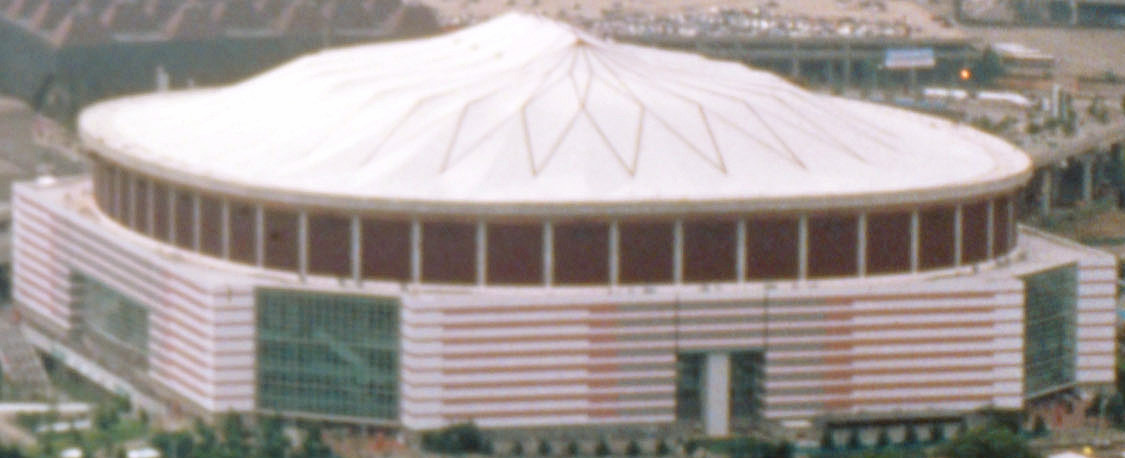
- The Georgia Dome in Atlanta, Georgia, hosted the Peach Bowl.
North Carolina Tar Heels	Auburn Tigers
(7–5)	(7–4)
ACC	SEC
16	10
Head coach: John Bunting	Head coach: Tommy Tuberville
	1	2	3	4	Total
North Carolina	7	3	6	0	16
Auburn	0	0	0	10	10
- Date: December 31, 2001
- Season: 2001
- Stadium: Georgia Dome
- Location: Atlanta, Georgia
- Referee: Jon Bible (Big 12)

United States TV coverage
- Network: ESPN
- Announcers: Dave Barnett, Bill Curry, Mike Golic and Michele Tafoya

The 2001 Peach Bowl featured the North Carolina Tar Heels and Auburn Tigers.

== Background ==
North Carolina, in the first season under new head coach John Bunting, started their season by losing the first three games of the year. However, they rebounded with five wins in a row (which included wins over #6 Florida State and #13 Clemson). This was followed by losses to #23 Georgia Tech (while ranked) and Wake Forest before closing out the regular season with two straight wins. This was the first bowl appearance for North Carolina in three years along with their fifth appearance in the Peach Bowl. The Tigers won six of their first seven games, which included a win over #1 ranked Florida. However, after being ranked #17, they would lose three of their next four games, with a December loss to LSU costing them the chance to a second straight SEC Championship Game. This was their third ever appearance in the Peach Bowl.

== Game summary ==
North Carolina scored on a 10-yard Willie Parker touchdown run, as UNC led 7–0 after one quarter of play. In the second quarter, Jeff Reed kicked a 22-yard field goal, extending North Carolina's lead to 10–0. In the third quarter, quarterback Ronald Curry scored on a 62-yard touchdown run giving North Carolina a 16–0 lead. In the fourth quarter, Damon Duval kicked a 34-yard field goal, and Daniel Cobb threw a 12-yard touchdown pass to Lorenzo Diamond, as Auburn made the final score 16–10.

== Statistical leaders ==
Passing

- North Carolina: Darian Durant: 7-of-14, 76 yards, one interception
- Auburn: Jason Campbell: 12-of-18, 74 yards

Rushing

- North Carolina: Willie Parker: 19 carries, 131 rush yds
- Auburn: Ronnie Brown: 6 carries, 28 yards
