= 2001 NC State Wolfpack football team =

American college football season

2001 NC State Wolfpack football

Tangerine Bowl, L 19–34 vs. Pittsburgh
- Conference: Atlantic Coast Conference
- Record: 7–5 (4–4 ACC)
- Head coach: Chuck Amato (2nd season)
- Offensive coordinator: Marty Galbraith (1st season)
- Defensive coordinator: Buddy Green (6th season)
- Home stadium: Carter–Finley Stadium

2001 Atlantic Coast Conference football standings
	Conf.			Overall
Team	W		L	W		L
No. 11 Maryland $	7	–	1	10	–	2
No. 15 Florida State	6	–	2	8	–	4
North Carolina	5	–	3	8	–	5
Clemson	4	–	4	7	–	5
No. 24 Georgia Tech	4	–	4	8	–	5
NC State	4	–	4	7	–	5
Wake Forest	3	–	5	6	–	5
Virginia	3	–	5	5	–	7
Duke	0	–	8	0	–	11
$ – BCS representative as conference champion; Rankings from AP Poll

The 2001 NC State Wolfpack football team represented North Carolina State University during the 2001 NCAA Division I-A football season. The team's head coach was Chuck Amato. NC State has been a member of the Atlantic Coast Conference (ACC) since the league's inception in 1953. The Wolfpack played its home games in 2001 at Carter–Finley Stadium in Raleigh, North Carolina, which has been NC State football's home stadium since 1966.

The originally scheduled home game on September 13, 2001 against Ohio was rescheduled to November 24, 2001 in the wake of the September 11 attacks.

== Schedule ==
Date	Time	Opponent	Site	TV	Result	Attendance
September 6	7:30 pm	Indiana*	Carter–Finley Stadium; Raleigh, North Carolina	ESPN	W 35–14	51,500
September 22	6:30 pm	at SMU*	Gerald J. Ford Stadium; Dallas	FSN	W 26–17	19,522
September 29	12:00 pm	North Carolina	Carter–Finley Stadium; Raleigh, North Carolina (rivalry)	JPS	L 9–17	51,500
October 6	6:30 pm	at Wake Forest	Groves Stadium; Winston-Salem, North Carolina (rivalry)		W 17–14	27,401
October 13	12:00 pm	No. 16 Clemson	Carter–Finley Stadium; Raleigh, North Carolina (Textile Bowl)	JPS	L 37–45	51,500
October 20	3:30 pm	at No. 23 Georgia Tech	Bobby Dodd Stadium; Atlanta	ABC	L 17–27	41,942
October 27	1:30 pm	Virginia	Carter–Finley Stadium; Raleigh, North Carolina		W 24–0	51,500
November 3	1:00 pm	at Duke	Wallace Wade Stadium; Durham, North Carolina (rivalry)		W 55–31	35,206
November 10	3:30 pm	at No. 10 Florida State	Doak Campbell Stadium; Tallahassee, Florida	ABC	W 34–28	82,425
November 17	7:45 pm	No. 10 Maryland	Carter–Finley Stadium; Raleigh, North Carolina	ESPN	L 19–23	51,500
November 24	1:00 pm	Ohio*	Carter–Finley Stadium; Raleigh, North Carolina		W 27–7	38,025
December 20	7:30 pm	vs. Pittsburgh*	Citrus Bowl; Orlando, Florida (Tangerine Bowl)	ESPN	L 19–34	28,562
*Non-conference game; Rankings from AP Poll released prior to the game; All times are in Eastern time

== Roster ==
2001 NC State Wolfpack football team roster
Players
Coaches
Offense

Pos.	#	Name	Class
QB	17	Philip Rivers	So
G	54	Sean Locklear	So
WR	82	Jerricho Cotchery	So

Defense

Pos.	#	Name	Class
SS	9	Terrence Holt	Jr
DB	36	Andre Maddox	Fr
LB	44	Levar Fisher	Sr

Special teams

Pos.	#	Name	Class
K	21	Adam Kiker	So

Head coach

- Chuck Amato

Coordinators/assistant coaches

- Doc Holliday – Asst. Head coach/Wide receivers
- Todd Stroud – Strength and conditioning
- Manny Diaz – Graduate assistant

Legend

- (C) Team captain
- (S) Suspended
- (I) Ineligible
- Injured
- Redshirt

Roster
Last update: 2019-08-04

== Game summaries ==
=== Florida State ===
NC State at Florida State

Team	1	2	3	4	Total
• Wolfpack	7	17	0	10	34
No. 10 Seminoles	14	0	7	7	28

- Date: November 10
- Location: Doak Campbell Stadium, Tallahassee, FL
- Game start: 3:35 pm EDT
- Elapsed time: 3:17
- Game attendance: 82,425
- Game weather: 79 °F (26 °C), Mostly sunny, Wind SE 4 mph (6.4 km/h)
- Referee: C. Mauzy
- TV announcers (ABC): Terry Gannon, Mike Mayock

Scoring summary
1	12:50	NCST	D. Green fumble recovery in end zone (Kiker kick)	NCST 7–0
1	9:26	FSU	T. Gardner 33-yard pass from C. Rix (Beitia kick)	Tied 7–7
1	0:59	FSU	J. Walker 63-yard pass from C. Rix (Beitia kick)	FSU 14–7
2	14:14	NCST	J. Cotchery 12-yard run (Kiker kick)	Tied 14–14
2	9:04	NCST	R. Robinson 3-yard run (Kiker kick)	NCST 21–14
2	0:12	NCST	A. Kiker 20-yard field goal	NCST 24–14
3	7:31	FSU	T. Gardner 22-yard pass from C. Rix (Beitia kick)	NCST 24–21
4	11:37	NCST	R. Robinson 24-yard run (Kiker kick)	NCST 31–21
4	10:05	FSU	C. Rix 3-yard run (Beitia kick)	NCST 31–28
4	2:11	NCST	A. Kiker 32-yard field goal	NCST 34–28

=== Maryland ===
Maryland at NC State

Team	1	2	3	4	Total
• No. 10 Terrapins	0	3	7	13	23
Wolfpack	3	6	3	7	19

- Date: November 17
- Location: Carter–Finley Stadium, Raleigh, NC
- Game start: 7:45 pm EDT
- Elapsed time: 3:25
- Game attendance: 51,500
- Game weather: 60 °F (16 °C), Clear
- Referee: Joseph Rider
- TV announcers (ESPN): Ron Franklin, Mike Gottfried, Adrian Karsten

Scoring summary
1	3:50	NCST	A. Kiker 33-yard field goal	NCST 3–0
2	10:40	NCST	A. Kiker 23-yard field goal	NCST 6–0
2	1:38	NCST	A. Kiker 41-yard field goal	NCST 9–0
2	0:05	MD	Nick Novak 25-yard field goal	NCST 9–3
3	8:51	MD	Guilian Gary 5-yard pass from Shaun Hill (Novak kick)	MD 10–9
3	3:45	NCST	A. Kiker 27-yard field goal	NCST 12–10
4	9:32	MD	Shaun Hill 6-yard run (pass failed)	MD 16–12
4	3:59	NCST	C. Jackson 1-yard pass from Philip Rivers (Kiker kick)	NCST 19–16
4	0:41	MD	Guilian Gary 8-yard pass from Shaun Hill (Novak kick)	MD 23–19
