= John Bunting (American football) =

American football player and coach (born 1950)

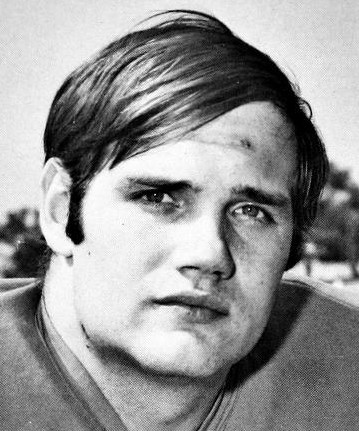

Biographical details
- Born: July 15, 1950 (age 76); Portland, Maine, U.S.

Playing career
- 1969–1971: North Carolina
- 1972–1982: Philadelphia Eagles
- 1983–1984: Philadelphia Stars
- Position: Linebacker

Coaching career (HC unless noted)
- 1985: Baltimore Stars (LB)
- 1986: Brown (DE)
- 1987: Glassboro State (DL)
- 1988–1992: Glassboro State / Rowan
- 1993–1994: Kansas City Chiefs (DE)
- 1995–1996: Kansas City Chiefs (LB)
- 1997: St. Louis Rams (LB)
- 1998–1999: St. Louis Rams (co-DC/LB)
- 2000: New Orleans Saints (LB)
- 2001–2006: North Carolina

Head coaching record
- Overall: 65–59–2
- Bowls: 1–1
- Tournaments: 2–2 (NCAA D-III playoffs)

Accomplishments and honors

Championships
- Super Bowl champion (XXXIV); 2 NJAC (1991–1992)

Awards
- First-team All-ACC (1971)

John Stephen Bunting (born July 15, 1950) is an American former football coach and player. As a linebacker, he played college football at North Carolina and spent eleven years with the Philadelphia Eagles in the National Football League (NFL) from 1972 to 1982. He was the head coach at North Carolina from 2001 to 2006. He was inducted to the Greater Wilmington Sports Hall of Fame in 2016.

== Playing career ==
Bunting grew up in Silver Spring, Maryland and graduated from Springbrook High School in 1968. He was a starting linebacker for the University of North Carolina from 1969 to 1971 under Coach Bill Dooley. In 1971, Bunting earned All-Atlantic Coast Conference honors and helped lead the Tar Heels to their first outright ACC title, in 1971.

He had an eleven-year NFL career as a linebacker with the Philadelphia Eagles from 1972 to 1982, and he played in Philadelphia's Super Bowl XV 27–10 loss to the Oakland Raiders. Bunting then played for the Philadelphia Stars of the United States Football League from 1983 to 1984.

== Coaching career ==
After retiring as an NFL player, Bunting moved into the coaching ranks. He served as a defensive assistant for three NFL teams: Kansas City Chiefs, St. Louis Rams, and the New Orleans Saints. As the Rams' co-defensive coordinator (along with Peter Giunta), he played a key role in leading that team to their victory in Super Bowl XXXIV. From 1988 to 1992, he served as head coach at Rowan University (known as Glassboro State during his first three seasons), compiling a 38-14-2 record.

In December 2000, UNC athletic director Dick Baddour decided to hire him as the school's head football coach, replacing the fired Carl Torbush.

In his first season, Bunting led the Tar Heels to an 8–5 record and a victory over Auburn in the 2001 Peach Bowl. However, his teams since were highly inconsistent. Bunting compiled an overall record of 27 wins and 45 losses over six seasons, and notched only two winning records in ACC play. Bunting did manage UNC's first victories over a team ranked in the top 10 of a major media poll in school history. In his first game as head coach, the Tar Heels beat nine-time defending ACC champion Florida State 41–9; the Seminoles were ranked sixth in the AP Poll at the time. After the 2003 season, a season in which the Tar Heels did not appear in a bowl game, Bunting was a coach in the final Blue-Gray All-Star Classic. In 2004, the Tar Heels defeated Miami 31–28 on a last-second field goal by Connor Barth; the Hurricanes were ranked fourth at the time in the AP poll. On the other end of the spectrum, his 2005 team was routed 69–14 by Louisville, one of the worst losses in modern Tar Heel history.

During his final season (2006), his team had a record of 3–9, while averaging over 23 fewer points per game than their opponents.

Baddour fired Bunting on October 22, 2006, but allowed Bunting to finish out the season. His last home victory on November 18, 2006, against North Carolina State University, broke a seven-game losing streak, and he was able to close out his career one week later with a 45–44 win over the Duke Blue Devils.

Since his split with North Carolina, Bunting has been working as a commentator and announcer for college football.

== Personal life ==
Bunting is married to Dawn Bunting and he has two children from his first marriage. They live in Naples, Florida.

== Head coaching record ==
Year	Team	Overall	Conference	Standing	Bowl/playoffs
Glassboro State / Rowan Profs (New Jersey Athletic Conference) (1988–1992)
1988	Glassboro State	5–5	3–3	4th	
1989	Glassboro State	5–3–2	4–2	T–3rd	
1990	Glassboro State	7–3	3–3	T–4th	
1991	Glassboro State	9–2	5–1	1st	L NCAA Division III First Round
1992	Rowan	12–1	6–0	1st	L NCAA Division III Semifinal
Glassboro State / Rowan:		38–14–2	21–9		
North Carolina Tar Heels (Atlantic Coast Conference) (2001–2006)
2001	North Carolina	8–5	5–3	3rd	W Peach
2002	North Carolina	3–9	1–7	8th	
2003	North Carolina	2–10	1–7	9th	
2004	North Carolina	6–6	5–3	T–3rd	L Continental Tire
2005	North Carolina	5–6	4–4	4th (Coastal)	
2006	North Carolina	3–9	2–6	5th (Coastal)	
North Carolina:		27–45	18–30		
Total:		65–59–2			
National championship Conference title Conference division title or championship game berth
