= 2001 Virginia Cavaliers football team =

American college football season

2001 Virginia Cavaliers football
- Conference: Atlantic Coast Conference
- Record: 5–7 (3–5 ACC)
- Head coach: Al Groh (1st season)
- Offensive coordinator: Bill Musgrave (1st season)
- Defensive coordinator: Al Golden (1st season)
- Base defense: 3–4
- Captains: Monsanto Pope; Evan Routzahn; Antwoine Womack
- Home stadium: Scott Stadium

2001 Atlantic Coast Conference football standings
	Conf.			Overall
Team	W		L	W		L
No. 11 Maryland $	7	–	1	10	–	2
No. 15 Florida State	6	–	2	8	–	4
North Carolina	5	–	3	8	–	5
Clemson	4	–	4	7	–	5
No. 24 Georgia Tech	4	–	4	8	–	5
NC State	4	–	4	7	–	5
Wake Forest	3	–	5	6	–	5
Virginia	3	–	5	5	–	7
Duke	0	–	8	0	–	11
$ – BCS representative as conference champion; Rankings from AP Poll

The 2001 Virginia Cavaliers football team represented the University of Virginia as a member of the Atlantic Coast Conference (ACC) during the 2001 NCAA Division I-A football season. Led by first-year head coach Al Groh, the Cavaliers compiled an overall record of 5–7 with a mark of 3–5 in conference play, tying for seventh place in the ACC. The team played home games at Scott Stadium in Charlottesville, Virginia.

On December 30, 2000, Al Groh was named the head coach of the Cavaliers football team, succeeding George Welsh. The game against Penn State, originally scheduled for September 13, was postponed to December 1 due to the September 11 attacks.

== Schedule ==
Date	Time	Opponent	Site	TV	Result	Attendance
August 25	2:00 pm	at No. 22 Wisconsin*	Camp Randall Stadium; Madison, WI (Eddie Robinson Classic)	FSN	L 17–26	76,740
September 1	4:30 pm	Richmond*	Scott Stadium; Charlottesville, VA		W 17–16	56,591
September 22	5:45 pm	at No. 19 Clemson	Memorial Stadium; Clemson, SC	ESPN2	W 26–24	77,791
September 29	1:00 pm	Duke	Scott Stadium; Charlottesville, VA		W 31–10	54,653
October 6	12:00 pm	at No. 25 Maryland	Byrd Stadium; College Park, MD (rivalry)	JPS	L 24–41	44,197
October 13	1:30 pm	at North Carolina	Kenan Memorial Stadium; Chapel Hill, NC (South's Oldest Rivalry)		L 24–30	53,500
October 20	7:45 pm	No. 21 Florida State^{†}	Scott Stadium; Charlottesville, VA (Jefferson–Eppes Trophy)	ESPN	L 7–43	61,383
October 27	1:30 pm	at NC State	Carter–Finley Stadium; Raleigh, NC		L 0–24	51,500
November 3	12:00 pm	Wake Forest	Scott Stadium; Charlottesville, VA	JPS	L 30–34	50,228
November 10	3:30 pm	No. 20 Georgia Tech	Scott Stadium; Charlottesville, VA		W 39–38	52,494
November 17	3:30 pm	No. 18 Virginia Tech*	Scott Stadium; Charlottesville, VA (rivalry)	ESPN	L 17–31	61,625
December 1	12:00 pm	Penn State*	Scott Stadium; Charlottesville, VA	ESPN	W 20–14	57,005
*Non-conference game; ^{†}Homecoming; Rankings from AP Poll released prior to the game; All times are in Eastern time

== Roster ==
2001 Virginia Cavaliers football team roster
Players			Coaches
Offense: Pos. / # / Name / Class; QB / 7 / Matt Schaub / So	Defense: Pos. / # / Name / Class	Special teams: Pos. / # / Name / Class	Head coach: Al Groh; Coordinators/assistant coaches Legend: (C) Team captain; (S) Suspended; (I) Ineligible; Injured; Redshirt
