= 2001 Georgia Tech Yellow Jackets football team =

American college football season

2001 Georgia Tech Yellow Jackets football

Seattle Bowl champion

Seattle Bowl, W 24–14 vs. Stanford
- Conference: Atlantic Coast Conference

Ranking
- AP: No. 24
- Record: 8–5 (4–4 ACC)
- Head coach: George O'Leary (8th season; regular season); Mac McWhorter (bowl game)
- Offensive coordinator: Bill O'Brien (1st season)
- Offensive scheme: Shotgun & Ace
- Defensive coordinator: Ted Roof (3rd season)
- Home stadium: Bobby Dodd Stadium

2001 Atlantic Coast Conference football standings
	Conf.			Overall
Team	W		L	W		L
No. 11 Maryland $	7	–	1	10	–	2
No. 15 Florida State	6	–	2	8	–	4
North Carolina	5	–	3	8	–	5
Clemson	4	–	4	7	–	5
No. 24 Georgia Tech	4	–	4	8	–	5
NC State	4	–	4	7	–	5
Wake Forest	3	–	5	6	–	5
Virginia	3	–	5	5	–	7
Duke	0	–	8	0	–	11
$ – BCS representative as conference champion; Rankings from AP Poll

The 2001 Georgia Tech Yellow Jackets football team represented Georgia Tech as member of the Atlantic Coast Conference (ACC) during the 2001 NCAA Division I-A football season. Eighth-year head coach George O'Leary led the team throughout the regular season before resigning to accept the head coaching job at the University of Notre Dame. Offensive line coach Mac McWhorter was appotined interim head coach for the team's bowl game. The Yellow Jackets compiled an overall record of 8–5 with a mark of 4–4 in conference play, placing in a three-way tie for fourth in the ACC. Georgia Tech was invited to the Seattle Bowl, where the Yellow Jackets defeated Stanford. The team played home games at Bobby Dodd Stadium in Atlanta.

== Schedule ==
Date	Time	Opponent	Rank	Site	TV	Result	Attendance
August 26	2:00 pm	vs. Syracuse*	No. 10	Giants Stadium; East Rutherford, NJ (Kickoff Classic)	ABC	W 13–7	41,517
September 1	6:00 pm	The Citadel*	No. 11	Bobby Dodd Stadium; Atlanta, GA		W 35–7	41,804
September 8	12:00 pm	at Navy*	No. 10	Navy–Marine Corps Memorial Stadium; Annapolis, MD	FSN	W 70–7	30,602
September 29	3:30 pm	Clemson	No. 9	Bobby Dodd Stadium; Atlanta, GA (rivalry)	ABC	L 44–47 ^{OT}	41,924
October 6	1:00 pm	at Duke	No. 17	Wallace Wade Stadium; Durham, NC		W 37–10	10,431
October 11	7:30 pm	No. 22 Maryland	No. 15	Bobby Dodd Stadium; Atlanta, GA	ESPN	L 17–20 ^{OT}	40,574
October 20	3:30 pm	NC State	No. 23	Bobby Dodd Stadium; Atlanta, GA	ABC	W 27–17	41,942
November 1	7:30 pm	No. 22 North Carolina	No. 23	Bobby Dodd Stadium; Atlanta, GA	ESPN	W 28–21	41,893
November 10	3:15 pm	at Virginia	No. 20	Scott Stadium; Charlottesville, VA		L 38–39	52,494
November 17	12:00 pm	at Wake Forest		Groves Stadium; Winston-Salem, NC	JPS	W 38–33	24,263
November 24	7:45 pm	No. 19 Georgia*	No. 21	Bobby Dodd Stadium; Atlanta, GA (Clean, Old-Fashioned Hate)	ESPN	L 17–31	41,974
December 1	3:30 pm	at Florida State		Doak Campbell Stadium; Tallahassee, FL	ESPN	L 17–28	82,269
December 27	4:00 pm	vs. No. 11 Stanford*		Safeco Field; Seattle, WA (Seattle Bowl)	ESPN	W 24–14	30,144
*Non-conference game; Rankings from AP Poll released prior to the game; All times are in Eastern time

== Preseason ==
Coming off three consecutive seasons with New Year's Day bowl appearances and wins over the rival Georgia Bulldogs, Georgia Tech was expected to contend for the national championship in 2001. In 2000, quarterback George Godsey had picked up where his predecessor Joe Hamilton had left off, passing for 2,906 yards and 23 touchdowns against just 6 interceptions. Armed with targets like Kelly Campbell for his senior season, a number of preseason magazines named Godsey to first-team all-conference honors, and pundits predicted that a loaded Georgia Tech team would win the Atlantic Coast Conference title with the departure of many key players from the defending champion Florida State Seminoles.

== Roster ==
2001 Georgia Tech Yellow Jackets football team roster
Players
Coaches
Offense

Pos.	#	Name	Class
TE	85	Salih Besirevic	Fr
WR	8	Trevor Browman	Fr
G	63	Tim Brown	Jr
RB	35	Joe Burns	Sr
WR	6	Kelly Campbell	Sr
WR	5	Nate Curry	So
RB	48	P. J. Daniels	Fr
OT	70	Nat Dorsey	Fr
RB	2	Sidney Ford	Jr
TE	89	John Paul Foschi	So
QB	11	George Godsey	Sr
WR	3	Will Glover	Jr
QB	13	Andy Hall	So
G	72	Brad Honeycutt	Fr
TE	84	Will Hunter	So
TE	88	Brian Lee	Jr
FB	45	Ross Mitchell	Sr
C	61	David Schmidgall	Sr
WR	82	Jonathan Smith	So
WR	9	Kerry Watkins	Jr

Defense

Pos.	#	Name	Class
DT	99	Omar Billy	Fr
FS	22	James Butler	Fr
CB	23	Joanthan Cox	So
SS	4	Corey Collins	Jr
LB	59	Matthew Eiheridge	Jr
DE	44	Tony Hargrove	Fr
DT	96	Gary Johnson	Jr
FS	21	Marty O'Leary	Sr
DE	38	Nick Rogers	Sr
LB	51	Daryl Smith	So
DE	56	Scott Wolf	Fr
SS	33	Chris Young	Sr

Special teams

Pos.	#	Name	Class
K	4	Max DiPace	Jr
P	30	Dan Dyke	Jr

Head coach

- George O'Leary (regular season)
- Mac McWhorter (bowl game)

Coordinators/assistant coaches

- Bill O'Brien – Offensive coordinator/quarterbacks
- Glenn Spencer – Running backs
- David Kelly – Wide receivers
- Geoff Collins – Tight ends
- Mac McWhorter – Offensive line/assistant head coach
- Ted Roof – Defensive coordinator/linebackers
- Peter McCarty – Defensive tackles
- Lance Thompson – Defensive ends/recruiting coordinator
- Danny Crossman – Defensive backs/special teams

Legend

- (C) Team captain
- (S) Suspended
- (I) Ineligible
- Injured
- Redshirt

Roster
