= Matt Murphy (tight end) =

American football player (born 1980)

No. 49, 81, 87
- Position: Tight end

Personal information
- Born: February 23, 1980 (age 46); New Haven, Michigan, U.S.
- Listed height: 6 ft 5 in (1.96 m)
- Listed weight: 277 lb (126 kg)

Career information
- High school: New Haven
- College: Maryland
- NFL draft: 2002: 7th round, 252nd overall pick

Career history
- Detroit Lions (2002–2003); Houston Texans (2003–2005); Seattle Seahawks (2006)*; Buffalo Bills (2006–2008); Denver Broncos (2008)
- * Offseason or practice squad member only

Career NFL statistics
- Receptions: 3
- Receiving yards: 34
- Stats at Pro Football Reference

Matthew Jarrid Murphy (born February 23, 1980) is an American former professional football player in the National Football League (NFL). He played college football for the Maryland Terrapins and was selected in the seventh round of the 2002 NFL draft by the Detroit Lions. Murphy retired after the 2008 season.

== Early life ==
Murphy was born to Michael and Dawn Murphy on February 23, 1980 in New Haven, Michigan. His uncle, Dwight Lee had played football in college at Michigan State where he had earned an All-American honorable mention.

He attended New Haven High School where he played six positions on the football team: defensive end, defensive tackle, fullback, linebacker, tight end, and wide receiver. During his senior year in 1996, Murphy compiled 80 tackles on defense and the Detroit Free Press named him an All-Met player.

== College career ==
Murphy attended the University of Maryland, where he played as a tight end for the Terrapins. He was the first player to commit to the Maryland's then new head coach Ron Vanderlinden.

He sat out the 1997 season as a redshirt (college sports) before acting as the second-string tight end behind Eric James. That season, Murphy saw action in six games but recorded no receptions.

In 1999, Murphy was moved from tight end to defensive end. He saw action against Western Carolina Catamounts, West Virginia, and North Carolina, recording 9 quarterback hits and 2 tackles. Murphy missed 2000 spring practice due to shoulder surgery.

In 2000, he saw action in all eleven of the Terps' games, including a start as a defensive end against Virginia. He returned to the tight end role later in the season. Murphy recorded two tackles and no receptions.

In 2001, Murphy played in eleven games, compiling twelve receptions for 137 yards. This season was Maryland's best in over a decade, with the team finishing with a 10–2 record, securing the Atlantic Coast Conference championship, and a Bowl Championship Series berth against fifth-ranked Florida, where Murphy led the Terps in receptions in the losing effort.

== Professional career ==
=== Detroit Lions ===
Murphy was selected in the seventh round of the 2002 NFL draft by the Detroit Lions (253rd overall). That season, he saw action in one game against the Minnesota Vikings, where he made one reception for a gain of eight yards. On September 2, 2003, Murphy was released and then the following day re-signed to the Lions practice squad.

=== Houston Texans ===
On December 10, 2003, he was signed by the Houston Texans off of the Lions' practice squad. He remained with the Texans for three years, playing one, eleven, and nine games in the 2003, 2004, and 2005 seasons, but did not compile any further statistics until 2005. Then, Murphy made two receptions for 26 yards, one for 14 and one for 12 yards. He was released on June 2, 2006.

=== Seattle Seahawks ===
Murphy signed with the Seattle Seahawks on August 2, 2006, but was released on September 2, 2006.

=== Buffalo Bills ===
On November 22, 2006, Murphy was picked up by the Buffalo Bills. He played two games each for Buffalo in the 2006 and 2007 seasons, but compiled no statistics. Prior to the 2008 season, Murphy injured his shoulder during practice with a partial rotator cuff tear. He was released on September 13, 2008.

=== Denver Broncos ===
Murphy was signed by the Denver Broncos on October 27, 2008. He was waived on November 1, 2008.
