= 2001 Virginia Tech Hokies football team =

American college football season

2001 Virginia Tech Hokies football

Gator Bowl, L 17–30 vs. Florida State
- Conference: Big East Conference

Ranking
- Coaches: No. 18
- AP: No. 18
- Record: 8–4 (4–3 Big East)
- Head coach: Frank Beamer (15th season)
- Offensive coordinator: Rickey Bustle (8th season)
- Offensive scheme: Multiple
- Defensive coordinator: Bud Foster (7th season)
- Base defense: 4–4
- Home stadium: Lane Stadium

2001 Big East Conference football standings
| | Conf. | | | Overall |
| Team | W | | L | W | | L |
|---|---|---|---|---|---|---|
| No. 1 Miami (FL) $# | 7 | – | 0 | 12 | – | 0 |
| No. 14 Syracuse | 6 | – | 1 | 10 | – | 3 |
| No. 18 Virginia Tech | 4 | – | 3 | 8 | – | 4 |
| No. 21 Boston College | 4 | – | 3 | 8 | – | 4 |
| Pittsburgh | 4 | – | 3 | 7 | – | 5 |
| Temple | 2 | – | 5 | 4 | – | 7 |
| West Virginia | 1 | – | 6 | 3 | – | 8 |
| Rutgers | 0 | – | 7 | 2 | – | 9 |
# – BCS National Champion; $ – BCS representative as conference champion; Rankings from AP poll

The 2001 Virginia Tech Hokies football team represented the Virginia Polytechnic Institute and State University during the 2001 NCAA Division I-A football season. The team's head coach was Frank Beamer.

== Schedule ==
| Date | Time | Opponent | Rank | Site | TV | Result | Attendance | Source |
|---|---|---|---|---|---|---|---|---|
| September 1 | 12:00 p.m. | Connecticut* | No. 9 | Lane Stadium; Blacksburg, VA | ESPN Plus | W 52–10 | 53,662 | |
| September 8 | 12:00 p.m. | Western Michigan* | No. 9 | Lane Stadium; Blacksburg, VA | ESPN2 | W 31–0 | 53,662 | |
| September 22 | 12:00 p.m. | at Rutgers | No. 9 | Rutgers Stadium; Piscataway, NJ | ESPN Plus | W 50–0 | 27,514 | |
| September 29 | 12:00 p.m. | UCF* | No. 8 | Lane Stadium; Blacksburg, VA | SUN | W 46–14 | 53,662 | |
| October 6 | 12:00 p.m. | at West Virginia | No. 8 | Mountaineer Field; Morgantown, WV (rivalry) | ESPN2 | W 35–0 | 63,271 | |
| October 13 | 6:30 p.m. | Boston College^{†} | No. 6 | Lane Stadium; Blacksburg, VA (rivalry) | ESPN2 | W 34–20 | 53,662 | |
| October 27 | 12:00 p.m. | Syracuse | No. 5 | Lane Stadium; Blacksburg, VA | ESPN Plus | L 14–22 | 53,662 | |
| November 3 | 12:00 p.m. | at Pittsburgh | No. 12 | Heinz Field; Pittsburgh, PA | ESPN Plus | L 7–38 | 55,585 | |
| November 10 | 12:00 p.m. | at Temple | No. 23 | Veterans Stadium; Philadelphia, PA | | W 35–0 | 21,915 | |
| November 17 | 3:30 p.m. | at Virginia* | No. 18 | Scott Stadium; Charlottesville, VA (rivalry) | ESPN | W 31–17 | 61,625 | |
| December 1 | 1:00 p.m. | No. 1 Miami (FL) | No. 14 | Lane Stadium; Blacksburg, VA (rivalry) | ABC | L 24–26 | 53,662 | |
| January 1, 2002 | 12:30 p.m. | vs. No. 24 Florida State* | No. 15 | Alltel Stadium; Jacksonville, FL (Gator Bowl) | NBC | L 17–30 | 72,202 | |
*Non-conference game; ^{†}Homecoming; Rankings from AP Poll released prior to the game; All times are in Eastern time

== Rankings ==
Ranking movements Legend: ██ Increase in ranking ██ Decrease in ranking — = Not ranked
| | Week | | | | | | | | | | | | | | | | |
| Poll | Pre | 1 | 2 | 3 | 4 | 5 | 6 | 7 | 8 | 9 | 10 | 11 | 12 | 13 | 14 | 15 | Final |
|---|---|---|---|---|---|---|---|---|---|---|---|---|---|---|---|---|---|
| AP | 9 | 9 | 9 | 9 | 8 | 8 | 6 | 6 | 5 | 12 | 23 | 18 | 16 | 14 | 15 | 15 | 18 |
| Coaches | 9 | 9 | 9 | 9 | 7 | 6 | 5 | 4 | 4 | 12 | 22 | 17 | 15 | 13 | 16 | 16 | 18 |
| BCS | Not released | | | | | | | | 5 | 15 | — | — | — | — | — | — | Not released |

== Games summaries ==
=== West Virginia ===
Virginia Tech at West Virginia

| Team | 1 | 2 | 3 | 4 | Total |
|---|---|---|---|---|---|
| • No. 8 Hokies | 14 | 7 | 14 | 0 | 35 |
| West Virginia | 0 | 0 | 0 | 0 | 0 |

- Date: October 6, 2001
- Location: Mountaineer Field, Morgantown, WV
- Game start: 12:07 PM EDT
- Elapsed time: 3:10
- Game attendance: 63,271
- Game weather: Partly Cloudy; 48°F; 12 W
- Referee: John Smith

Scoring summary
| 1 | 7:00 | VT | Keith Burnell 1-yard run (Carter Warley kick) | VT 7–0 |
| 1 | 4:23 | VT | Jarrett Ferguson 3-yard run (Carter Warley kick) | VT 14–0 |
| 2 | 11:33 | VT | Kevin Jones 44-yard run (Carter Warley kick) | VT 21–0 |
| 3 | 7:23 | VT | Keith Burnell 10-yard run (Carter Warley kick) | VT 28–0 |
| 3 | 4:56 | VT | Jim Davis 27-yard interception return (Carter Warley kick) | VT 35–0 |

=== Miami (FL) ===
Miami (FL) at Virginia Tech

| Team | 1 | 2 | 3 | 4 | Total |
|---|---|---|---|---|---|
| • No. 1 Hurricanes | 0 | 20 | 3 | 3 | 26 |
| No. 14 Hokies | 3 | 0 | 7 | 14 | 24 |

- Date: December 1, 2001
- Location: Lane Stadium, Blacksburg, VA
- Game start: 1:13 PM EST
- Elapsed time: 3:17
- Game attendance: 53,662
- Game weather: Sunny and Mild; 65°F; W @ 8-10
- Referee: Jon Smith
- TV announcers (ABC): Brad Nessler, Bob Griese, Lynn Swann

Scoring summary
| 1 | 3:08 | VT | Warley 27-yard Field Goal | VT 3–0 |
| 2 | 13:05 | MIA | Jeremy Shockey 14-yard pass from Ken Dorsey (Todd Sievers kick) | MIA 7–3 |
| 2 | 6:11 | MIA | Clinton Portis 7-yard run (Todd Sievers kick) | MIA 14–3 |
| 2 | 3:59 | MIA | Todd Sievers 34-yard Field Goal | MIA 17–3 |
| 2 | 0:16 | MIA | Todd Sievers 43-yard Gield Goal | MIA 20–3 |
| 3 | 10:30 | VT | Jarrett Ferguson 1-yard run (Carter Warley kick) | MIA 20–10 |
| 3 | 4:41 | MIA | Todd Sievers 42-yard field goal | MIA 23–10 |
| 4 | 11:32 | MIA | Todd Sievers 39-yard field goal | MIA 26–10 |
| 4 | 8:33 | VT | Jarrett Ferguson 1-yard run (Terrell Parham pass) | MIA 26–18 |
| 4 | 6:03 | VT | Brandon Manning 22-yard blocked punt return (pass failed) | MIA 26–24 |

=== Gator Bowl ===
Virginia Tech vs. Florida State

| Team | 1 | 2 | 3 | 4 | Total |
|---|---|---|---|---|---|
| No. 15 Hokies | 3 | 0 | 14 | 0 | 17 |
| • No. 24 Seminoles | 0 | 10 | 3 | 17 | 30 |

- Date: January 1
- Location: Alltel Stadium, Jacksonville, FL
- Game attendance: 72,202
- Referee: David Witvoet
- TV announcers (NBC): Tom Hammond, Pat Haden, and Chris Wragge

Scoring summary
| 1 | 10:56 | VT | Carter Warley 36-yard field goal | VT 3–0 |
| 2 | 6:32 | FSU | Chris Rix 1-yard run (Xavier Beitia kick) | FSU 7–3 |
| 2 | 1:27 | FSU | Xavier Beitia 50-yard field goal | FSU 10–3 |
| 3 | 10:02 | VT | Kevin Jones 5-yard run (Warley kick) | Tied 10–10 |
| 3 | 1:42 | FSU | Xavier Beitia 47-yard field goal | FSU 13–10 |
| 3 | 0:40 | VT | Andre Davis 55-yard pass from Grant Noel (Warley kick) | VT 17–13 |
| 4 | 14:48 | FSU | Javon Walker 77-yard pass from Chris Rix (Beitia kick) | FSU 20–17 |
| 4 | 10:13 | FSU | Xavier Beitia 35-yard field goal | FSU 23–17 |
| 4 | 2:14 | FSU | Walker 23-yard pass from Rix (Beitia kick) | FSU 30–17 |

== Roster ==
2001 Virginia Tech Hokies football team roster
Players
Coaches
Offense

| Pos. | # | Name | Class |
|---|---|---|---|
| TB | 7 | Kevin Jones | Fr |
| FL | 9 | Terrell Parham | RJr |
| QB | 11 | Grant Noel | RJr |
| FL | 12 | Richard Johnson | RFr |
| QB | 14 | Bryan Randall | Fr |
| QB | 15 | Jason Davis | RFr |
| QB | 16 | Chris Clifton | Fr |
| SE | 18 | Emmett Johnson | Sr |
| WR | 19 | Ernest Wilford | RSo |
| TB | 20 | Keith Burnell | RJr |
| RB | 22 | Lee Suggs | RJr |
| FL | 26 | Shawn Witten | Jr |
| FB | 27 | Jarrett Ferguson | RSr |
| FB | 30 | Ryan Angelo | RSo |
| TB | 32 | Wayne Ward | RSr |
| FB | 42 | Josh Spence | RFr |
| FB | 43 | Doug Easlick | RSo |
| FB | 44 | Marvin Urquhart | RSo |
| FB | 47 | Wayne Briggs | RSr |
| OT | 57 | Anthony Davis | Jr |
| OT | 58 | Matt Wincek | Sr |
| G | 60 | Jacob Gibson | RSo |
| C | 61 | Steve DeMasi | RSr |
| C | 62 | Travis Conway | RFr |
| G | 63 | Jeff Werner | So |
| C | 64 | Jake Grove | RSo |
| OT | 65 | Tim Selmon | RJr |
| G | 66 | Will Montgomery | Fr |
| G | 67 | Anthony Nelson | RSo |
| C | 68 | Rovert Ramsey | RFr |
| G | 74 | Luke Owens | RJr |
| G | 76 | James Miller | Fr |
| OT | 77 | Thenus Franklin | RJr |
| OT | 79 | Jon Dunn | RFr |
| TE | 80 | Mike Jackson | RFr |
| SE | 81 | Chris Shreve | RSo |
| SE | 82 | Ronald Moody | RSo |
| TE | 85 | Jared Mazzetta | RFr |
| TE | 86 | Keith Willis | RSo |
| TE | 87 | Bob Slowikowski | RSr |
| FL | 88 | Andre Davis | RSr |
| TE | 93 | Browning Wynn | RSr |

Defense

| Pos. | # | Name | Class |
|---|---|---|---|
| CB | 1 | Eric Green | So |
| CB | 2 | Ronyell Whitaker | RJr |
| LB | 3 | Deon Provitt | RSo |
| CB | 4 | DeAngelo Hall | Fr |
| CB | 5 | Kevin McCadam | Sr |
| LB | 6 | Vegas Robinson | RSo |
| FS | 8 | Vincent Fuller | RFr |
| CB | 17 | Garnell Wilds | RSo |
| S | 21 | Michael Crawford | RSo |
| LB | 23 | TJ Jackson | RJr |
| CB | 24 | Larry Austin | RSr |
| ROV | 25 | Billy Hardee | RJr |
| DE | 28 | Lamar Cobb | RJr |
| FS | 31 | Mike Daniels | RFr |
| LB | 33 | Chad Cooper | RFr |
| LB | 34 | Brian Welch | RSr |
| FS | 35 | Willie Pile | RJr |
| LB | 36 | Dirk Taylor | Sr |
| ROV | 37 | Chris Krebs | RSr |
| LB | 39 | Alex Markogiannakis | RJr |
| LB | 40 | Ben Taylor | Sr |
| LB | 41 | Jake Houseright | Sr |
| LB | 45 | Mikal Baaqee | RFr |
| LB | 46 | Chris Buie | RSo |
| LB | 48 | Brandon Manning | RFr |
| DT | 53 | Channing Reed | Sr |
| DT | 54 | Dan Wilkinson | RSr |
| DT | 70 | Kevin Lewis | So |
| DT | 71 | David Pugh | RSr |
| DE | 83 | Nathaniel Adibi | RSo |
| DE | 90 | Jeff Thompson | RSo |
| DE | 91 | Jason Lallis | RFr |
| DT | 92 | Mark Costen | RSo |
| DT | 94 | Chad Beasley | RSr |
| DE | 95 | Jim Davis | So |
| DT | 96 | Joe Wilson | RSo |
| DE | 98 | Derrius Monroe | RSr |
| DE | 99 | Cols Colas | RSo |

Special teams

| Pos. | # | Name | Class |
|---|---|---|---|
| P | 38 | Vinnie Burns | RFr |
| PK | 49 | Carter Warley | RSo |
| LS | 55 | Ken Keister | RJr |
| P | 89 | Robert Peaslee | RSo |
| PK | 97 | Jon Mollerup | RJr |

Head coach

- Frank Beamer

Coordinators/assistant coaches

Legend

- (C) Team captain
- (S) Suspended
- (I) Ineligible
- Injured
- Redshirt

Roster

== Team players in the NFL ==
| Player | Position | Round | Pick | NFL club |
|---|---|---|---|---|
| André Davis | Wide receiver | 2 | 47 | Cleveland Browns |
| Ben Taylor | Linebacker | 4 | 111 | Cleveland Browns |
| Kevin McCadam | Safety | 5 | 148 | Atlanta Falcons |
| David Pugh | Defensive tackle | 6 | 182 | Indianapolis Colts |
| Bob Slowikowski | Tight end | 6 | 211 | Dallas Cowboys |
| Chad Beasley | Tackle | 7 | 218 | Minnesota Vikings |
| Derrius Monroe | Defensive end | 7 | 224 | New Orleans Saints |
| Jarrett Ferguson | Fullback | 7 | 251 | Buffalo Bills |
