= 2001 Clemson Tigers football team =

American college football season

2001 Clemson Tigers football

Humanitarian Bowl champion

Humanitarian Bowl, W 49–24 vs. Louisiana Tech
- Conference: Atlantic Coast Conference
- Record: 7–5 (4–4 ACC)
- Head coach: Tommy Bowden (3rd season)
- Offensive coordinator: Brad Scott (1st season)
- Offensive scheme: Pro set
- Defensive coordinator: Reggie Herring (3rd season)
- Base defense: 4–3
- Captains: Chad Carson; Woodrow Dantzler; Charles Hafley
- Home stadium: Memorial Stadium

2001 Atlantic Coast Conference football standings
	Conf.			Overall
Team	W		L	W		L
No. 11 Maryland $	7	–	1	10	–	2
No. 15 Florida State	6	–	2	8	–	4
North Carolina	5	–	3	8	–	5
Clemson	4	–	4	7	–	5
No. 24 Georgia Tech	4	–	4	8	–	5
NC State	4	–	4	7	–	5
Wake Forest	3	–	5	6	–	5
Virginia	3	–	5	5	–	7
Duke	0	–	8	0	–	11
$ – BCS representative as conference champion; Rankings from AP Poll

The 2001 Clemson Tigers football team represented Clemson University as a member of the Atlantic Coast Conference (ACC) during the 2001 NCAA Division I-A football season. Led by third-year head coach Tommy Bowden, the Tigers compiled an overall record of 7–5 with a mark of 4–4 in conference play, placing in a three-way tie for fourth in the ACC. Clemson was invited to the Humanitarian Bowl, where the Tigers defeated Louisiana Tech. The team played home games at Memorial Stadium in Clemson, South Carolina.

Brad Scott served as Clemson's offensive coordinator, and Reggie Herring was as the team's defensive coordinator. On December 1, against Duke, in a game that had been rescheduled due to the September 11 attacks, Clemson quarterback Woodrow Dantzler became the first player in National Collegiate Athletic Association (NCAA) history to pass for at least 2,000 yards and rush for at least 1,000 yards in a season.

== Schedule ==
Date	Time	Opponent	Rank	Site	TV	Result	Attendance	Source
September 1	1:00 p.m.	UCF*	No. 19	Memorial Stadium; Clemson, SC		W 21–13	81,482	
September 8	1:00 p.m.	Wofford*	No. 20	Memorial Stadium; Clemson, SC		W 38–14	79,156	
September 22	5:45 p.m.	Virginia	No. 19	Memorial Stadium; Clemson, SC	ESPN2	L 24–26	77,791	
September 29	3:30 p.m.	at No. 9 Georgia Tech		Bobby Dodd Stadium; Atlanta, GA (rivalry)	ABC	W 47–44 ^{OT}	41,924	
October 13	12:00 p.m.	at NC State	No. 16	Carter–Finley Stadium; Raleigh, NC (Textile Bowl)	JPS	W 45–37	51,500	
October 20	12:00 p.m.	North Carolina^{†}	No. 13	Memorial Stadium; Clemson, SC	ESPN2	L 3–38	84,869	
October 27	12:00 p.m.	at Wake Forest		Groves Stadium; Winston-Salem, NC	JPS	W 21–14	21,290	
November 3	3:30 p.m.	No. 14 Florida State		Memorial Stadium; Clemson, SC (rivalry)	ABC	L 27–41	85,036	
November 10	7:00 p.m.	at No. 13 Maryland		Byrd Stadium; College Park, MD	ESPN2	L 20–37	52,462	
November 17	12:30 p.m.	at No. 22 South Carolina*		Williams–Brice Stadium; Columbia, SC (rivalry)	JPS	L 15–20	85,000	
December 1	1:00 p.m.	Duke		Memorial Stadium; Clemson, SC		W 59–31	72,577	
December 31	12:30 p.m.	vs. Louisiana Tech*		Bronco Stadium; Boise, ID (Humanitarian Bowl)	ESPN	W 49–24	23,472	
*Non-conference game; ^{†}Homecoming; Rankings from AP Poll released prior to the game; All times are in Eastern time

== Roster ==
2001 Clemson Tigers football team roster
Players
Coaches
Offense

Pos.	#	Name	Class
G	68	Jermyn Chester	So
QB	1	Woodrow Dantzler	Sr

Defense

Pos.	#	Name	Class

Special teams

Pos.	#	Name	Class

Head coach

- Tommy Bowden

Coordinators/assistant coaches

Legend

- (C) Team captain
- (S) Suspended
- (I) Ineligible
- Injured
- Redshirt

Roster
