= Charles Hill (American football) =

American football player (born 1980)

No. 94, 98
- Position: Defensive tackle

Personal information
- Born: November 1, 1980 (age 46); Palmer Park, Maryland, U.S.
- Listed height: 6 ft 2 in (1.88 m)
- Listed weight: 300 lb (136 kg)

Career information
- High school: Eleanor Roosevelt (Greenbelt, Maryland)
- College: Maryland
- NFL draft: 2002: 3rd round, 83rd overall pick

Career history
- Houston Texans (2002); → Berlin Thunder (2003); San Francisco 49ers (2003)*; Chicago Bears (2003); Carolina Panthers (2005)*; Orlando Predators (2006–2008)
- * Offseason or practice squad member only
- Stats at Pro Football Reference

Charles LeDawnta Hill (born November 1, 1980) is an American former professional football defensive tackle who played one season for the Houston Texans of the National Football League (NFL). He was selected by the Texans in the third round of the 2002 NFL draft. He also played one season in NFL Europe and three seasons in the Arena Football League (AFL).

== Early life ==
Hill was born to Charles Hill and Deborah Ford on 1 November 1980. He attended Eleanor Roosevelt High School in Greenbelt, Maryland. While there, Hill played on the varsity basketball team for three years, where he was noticed by the football coach, who convinced him to play football for his junior and senior years. As a junior, Roosevelt won the Prince George's County and regional football championships before falling to runners-up in the Maryland state final.

In 1997 as a senior, Hill saw action on both sides of the ball as part of the defensive and offensive lines. He recorded 114 tackles (87 solo), seven sacks, four fumble recoveries, and four forced fumbles. Hill was named an honorable mention all-county and honorable mention all-league player, and selected to play in the Chesapeake Classic and Mason-Dixon Classic high school all-star games. He graduated from Roosevelt in 1998.

== College career ==
Hill attended the University of Maryland. In 1998, as a true freshman, he saw action in nine games including three starts and recorded 16 tackles and one sack. In 1999, Hill saw action in ten games including three starts, accumulating 23 tackles. He also played part of the season as a back-up center during the early part of the season. In 2000, he started in nine games, but missed the matches against Clemson and Wake Forest due to a dislocated elbow. He recorded 43 tackles (22 solo), 12 quarterback hurries, and three sacks. That year, Hill was honored as an Atlantic Coast Conference All-Academic football player.

2001 proved Maryland's best season in over a decade, where the team compiled a 10–2 record and secured a Bowl Championship Series berth against number-five ranked Florida. That season, Hill started in all 11 games, including the Orange Bowl. He finished as the second-leading tackler behind only first-team All-American, E.J. Henderson. Hill recorded a total of 81 tackles (44 solo), including eight for a combined loss of 26 yards, nine quarterback hurries, and two sacks.

== Professional career ==
=== Houston Texans ===
Hill was selected in the third round of the 2002 NFL draft by the Houston Texans (83rd overall). During the 2002 season, he played in all 16 games for the Texans, and primarily saw action on special teams which included two kick-off returns. In 2003, he was allocated to the Berlin Thunder of NFL Europe, where he recorded 14 tackles, one sack, and one forced fumble. He was waived by the Texans on August 26, 2003.

=== San Francisco 49ers ===
Hill signed with the San Francisco 49ers on August 27, 2003 but was waived on August 31, 2003.

=== Chicago Bears ===
Hill was signed by the Chicago Bears on December 24, 2003. He was waived on August 26, 2004.

=== Carolina Panthers ===
Hill signed a reserve/future contract with the Carolina Panthers on January 4, 2005. He was waived by the Panthers on September 3, 2005.

=== Orlando Predators ===
Hill played for the Orlando Predators of the Arena Football League with the Orlando Predators from 2006 until the league folded in 2008. In 2006, Hill played in 11 games and recorded 7.5 tackles, three quarterback hurries, one forced fumble, and three sacks. In 2007, he saw action in 16 games playing as a nose tackle, tight end, and on special teams. That season, he recorded 8.5 tackles, a blocked field goal attempt, and two touchdown receptions.
