= 2001 NCAA Division I-A football rankings =

- Season: 2001
- Bowl season: 2001–02 bowl games
- Preseason No. 1: Florida
- End of season champions: Miami (FL)
- Conference with most teams in final AP poll: SEC (5)

Two human polls and one formulaic ranking make up the 2001 NCAA Division I-A football rankings. Unlike most sports, college football's governing body, the National Collegiate Athletic Association (NCAA), does not bestow a National Championship title for Division I-A football. That title is primarily bestowed by different polling agencies. There are several polls that currently exist. The main weekly polls are the AP Poll and Coaches Poll. About halfway through the season the Bowl Championship Series (BCS) standings are released.

== Legend ==
	Increase in ranking
	Decrease in ranking
	Not ranked previous week
	Selected for BCS National Championship Game
(#–#)	Win–loss record
(Italics)	Number of first place votes
т	Tied with team above or below also with this symbol

== AP Poll ==
	Preseason Aug 11	Week 1 Aug 26	Week 2 Sep 2	Week 3 Sep 9	Week 4 Sep 23	Week 5 Sep 30	Week 6 Oct 7	Week 7 Oct 14	Week 8 Oct 21	Week 9 Oct 28	Week 10 Nov 4	Week 11 Nov 11	Week 12 Nov 18	Week 13 Nov 25	Week 14 Dec 2	Week 15 Dec 9	Week 16 (Final) Jan 4	
1.	Florida (20)	Florida (0–0) (21)	Miami (FL) (1–0) (37)	Miami (FL) (2–0) (40)	Miami (FL) (2–0) (39)	Miami (FL) (3–0) (34)	Florida (5–0) (30)	Miami (FL) (5–0) (48)	Miami (FL) (5–0) (47)	Miami (FL) (6–0) (55)	Miami (FL) (7–0) (55)	Miami (FL) (8–0) (44)	Miami (FL) (9–0) (52)	Miami (FL) (10–0) (71)	Miami (FL) (11–0) (72)	Miami (FL) (11–0) (72)	Miami (FL) (12–0) (72)	1.
2.	Miami (FL) (33)	Miami (FL) (0–0) (33)	Florida (1–0) (19)	Florida (2–0) (14)	Florida (3–0) (15)	Florida (4–0) (22)	Miami (FL) (4–0) (23)	Oklahoma (6–0) (21)	Oklahoma (7–0) (22)	Nebraska (9–0) (17)	Nebraska (10–0) (17)	Nebraska (11–0) (28)	Nebraska (11–0) (20)	Florida (9–1) (1)	Tennessee (10–1)	Oregon (10–1)	Oregon (11–1)	2.
3.	Oklahoma (10)	Oklahoma (1–0) (10)	Oklahoma (2–0) (10)	Oklahoma (3–0) (11)	Oklahoma (3–0) (11)	Oklahoma (4–0) (9)	Oklahoma (5–0) (16)	Nebraska (7–0) (2)	Nebraska (8–0) (2)	Oklahoma (7–1)	Oklahoma (8–1)	Oklahoma (9–1)	Florida (9–1)	Texas (10–1)	Oregon (10–1)	Colorado (10–2)	Florida (10–2)	3.
4.	Nebraska (4)	Nebraska (1–0) (3)	Texas (1–0) (4)	Nebraska (3–0) (2)	Nebraska (4–0) (2)	Nebraska (5–0) (2)	Nebraska (6–0) (2)	UCLA (5–0) (1)	UCLA (6–0) (1)	Florida (6–1)	Florida (7–1)	Florida (8–1)	Oklahoma (10–1)	Oregon (9–1)	Colorado (10–2)	Nebraska (11–1)	Tennessee (11–2)	4.
5.	Texas (5)	Texas (0–0) (4)	Nebraska (2–0) (2)	Texas (2–0) (4)	Texas (3–0) (4)	Texas (4–0) (4)	Oregon (5–0)	Oregon (6–0)	Virginia Tech (6–0)	Texas (7–1)	Texas (8–1)	Texas (9–1)	Texas (9–1)	Tennessee (9–1)	Nebraska (11–1)	Florida (9–2)	Texas (11–2)	5.
6.	Florida State	Florida State (0–0)	Florida State (1–0)	Florida State (2–0)	Oregon (3–0)	Tennessee (3–0) (7)	Virginia Tech (5–0)	Virginia Tech (6–0)	Florida (5–1)	Michigan (6–1)	Tennessee (6–1)	Tennessee (7–1)	Oregon (9–1)	Nebraska (11–1)	Florida (9–2)	Maryland (10–1)	Oklahoma (11–2)	6.
7.	Oregon	Oregon (0–0) (1)	Oregon (1–0)	Oregon (2–0)	Tennessee (2–0)	Oregon (4–0)	UCLA (4–0)	Florida (5–1)	Texas (6–1)	Tennessee (5–1)	Oregon (8–1)	Oregon (9–1)	Tennessee (8–1)	Maryland (10–1)	Maryland (10–1)	Illinois (10–1)	LSU (10–3)	7.
8.	Tennessee	Tennessee (0–0)	Tennessee (1–0)	Tennessee (2–0)	Virginia Tech (3–0)	Virginia Tech (4–0)	Fresno State (5–0) (1)	Fresno State (6–0)	Michigan (5–1)	Oregon (7–1)	Washington (7–1)	BYU (10–0)	Maryland (10–1)	Illinois (10–1)	Illinois (10–1)	Tennessee (10–2)	Nebraska (11–2)	8.
9.	Virginia Tech	Virginia Tech (0–0)	Virginia Tech (1–0)	Virginia Tech (2–0)	Georgia Tech (3–0)	UCLA (4–0)	South Carolina (5–0)	Texas (5–1)	Tennessee (4–1)	UCLA (6–1)	BYU (9–0)	Washington State (9–1)	BYU (11–0)	Colorado (9–2)	BYU (12–0)	Texas (10–2)	Colorado (10–3)	9.
10.	Georgia Tech	Oregon State (0–0)	Georgia Tech (2–0)	Georgia Tech (3–0)	Fresno State (4–0) (1)	Fresno State (5–0) (1)	Washington (4–0)	Michigan (5–1)	Maryland (7–0)	Stanford (5–1)	Florida State (6–2)	Maryland (9–1)	Illinois (9–1)	BYU (11–0)	Texas (10–2)	Oklahoma (10–2)	Washington State (10–2)	10.
11.	Oregon State	Georgia Tech (1–0)	Michigan (1–0)	Fresno State (3–0) (1)	Kansas State (2–0)	Washington (3–0)	Texas (4–1)	Tennessee (3–1)	Oregon (6–1)	Washington (6–1)	Washington State (8–1)	Michigan (7–2)	Michigan (8–2)	Oklahoma (10–2)	Oklahoma (10–2)	Stanford (9–2)	Maryland (10–2)	11.
12.	Michigan	Michigan (0–0)	Kansas State (0–0)	Kansas State (1–0)	UCLA (3–0)	Kansas State (2–1)	Michigan (4–1)	Maryland (6–0)	South Carolina (6–1)	Virginia Tech (6–1)	Michigan (6–2)	Illinois (8–1)	Washington (8–2)	Stanford (8–2)	Stanford (9–2)	LSU (9–3)	Illinois (10–2)	12.
13.	Kansas State	Kansas State (0–0)	LSU (1–0)	Washington (1–0)	Washington (2–0)	South Carolina (4–0)	Tennessee (3–1)	Clemson (4–1)	Washington (5–1)	BYU (8–0)	Maryland (8–1)	Stanford (6–2)	Stanford (7–2)	Washington State (9–2)	Washington State (9–2)	Washington State (9–2)	South Carolina (9–3)	13.
14.	LSU	LSU (0–0)	UCLA (1–0)	UCLA (2–0)	LSU (2–0)	Northwestern (3–0)	Florida State (3–1)	Colorado (5–1)	Washington State (7–0)	Florida State (5–2)	South Carolina (7–2)	Syracuse (8–2)	Colorado (8–2)	Virginia Tech (8–2)	South Carolina (8–3)	South Carolina (8–3)	Syracuse (10–3)	14.
15.	Washington	Washington (0–0)	Washington (0–0)	LSU (2–0)	South Carolina (3–0)	Michigan (3–1)	Georgia Tech (4–1)	Washington (4–1)	Georgia (5–1)	Maryland (7–1)	Illinois (7–1)	Colorado (8–2)	Washington State (9–2)	South Carolina (8–3)	Virginia Tech (8–3)	Virginia Tech (8–3)	Florida State (8–4)	15.
16.	Northwestern	Northwestern (0–0)	Northwestern (0–0)	Northwestern (1–0)	Northwestern (2–0)	Florida State (3–1)	Clemson (3–1)	South Carolina (5–1)	BYU (7–0)	Washington State (7–1)	Stanford (5–2)	Washington (7–2)	Virginia Tech (8–2)	Georgia (7–3)	Georgia (8–3)	Georgia (8–3)	Stanford (9–3)	16.
17.	UCLA	UCLA (0–0)	Notre Dame (0–0)	Mississippi State (1–0)	Michigan (2–1)	Georgia Tech (3–1)	Purdue (4–0)	Georgia (4–1)	Auburn (6–1)	South Carolina (6–2)	UCLA (6–2)	Auburn (7–2)	Louisville (10–1)	Michigan (8–3)	Michigan (8–3)	Michigan (8–3)	Louisville (11–2)	17.
18.	Notre Dame	Notre Dame (0–0)	Mississippi State (1–0)	South Carolina (2–0)	Florida State (2–1)	LSU (2–1)	BYU (5–0)	BYU (6–0)	Fresno State (6–1)	Georgia (5–2)	Syracuse (7–2)	Virginia Tech (7–2)	South Carolina (8–3)	Syracuse (9–3)	Syracuse (9–3)	Syracuse (9–3)	Virginia Tech (8–4)	18.
19.	Clemson	Clemson (0–0)	Fresno State (2–0)	Clemson (2–0)	Oregon State (1–1)	Clemson (3–1)	Georgia (3–1)	Washington State (6–0)	Florida State (4–2)	Syracuse (7–2)	Georgia (5–2)	Louisville (9–1)	Georgia (6–3)	Washington (8–3)	Fresno State (11–2)	BYU (12–1)	Washington (8–4)	19.
20.	Mississippi State	Mississippi State (0–0)	Clemson (1–0)	Michigan (1–1)	BYU (3–0)	BYU (4–0)	Colorado (4–1)	Auburn (5–1)	Stanford (4–1)	Purdue (5–1)	Georgia Tech (6–2)	UCLA (6–3)	Marshall (9–1)	Marshall (10–1)	Washington (8–3)	Fresno State (11–2)	Michigan (8–4)	20.
21.	South Carolina	South Carolina (0–0)	South Carolina (1–0)	Ohio State (1–0)	Mississippi State (1–1)	Purdue (3–0)	Ohio State (3–1)	Florida State (3–2)	Georgia Tech (5–2)	Illinois (6–1)	Colorado (7–2)	Florida State (6–3)	Georgia Tech (7–3)	Fresno State (10–2)	LSU (8–3)	Washington (8–3)	Boston College (8–4)	21.
22.	Wisconsin	Wisconsin (1–0)	Oregon State (0–1)	Oregon State (1–1)	Illinois (3–0)	Stanford (3–0)	Maryland (5–0)	Northwestern (4–1)	Illinois (6–1)	North Carolina (5–3)	Michigan State (5–2)	South Carolina (7–3)	Syracuse (8–3)	LSU (7–3)	Ohio State (7–4)	Ohio State (7–4)	Georgia (8–4)	22.
23.	Ohio State	Ohio State (0–0)	Wisconsin (1–1)	Notre Dame (0–1)	Michigan State (2–0)	Toledo (4–0)	Stanford (3–0)	Georgia Tech (4–2)	North Carolina (5–3)	Georgia Tech (5–2)	Virginia Tech (6–2)	Georgia (5–3)	Fresno State (9–2)	Ohio State (7–4)	Louisville (10–2)	Louisville (10–2)	Toledo (10–2)	23.
24.	Colorado State	Colorado State (0–0)	Ohio State (0–0)	BYU (3–0)	Purdue (2–0)	Texas A&M (4–0)	Kansas State (2–2)	Purdue (4–1)	Purdue (4–1)	Texas A&M (7–1)	Auburn (6–2)	Marshall (8–1)	Arkansas (7–3)	Louisville (10–2)	Florida State (7–4)	Florida State (7–4)	Georgia Tech (8–5)	24.
25.	Alabama	Alabama (0–0)	Georgia (1–0)	Louisville (3–0)	Toledo (3–0)	Maryland (4–0)	Texas A&M (5–0)	Toledo (5–0)	Colorado (5–2)	Colorado (6–2)	Louisville (8–1)	Ohio State (6–3)	Boston College (7–3)	Auburn (7–3)	Toledo (9–2)	Toledo (9–2)	BYU (12–2)	25.
	Preseason Aug 11	Week 1 Aug 26	Week 2 Sep 2	Week 3 Sep 9	Week 4 Sep 23	Week 5 Sep 30	Week 6 Oct 7	Week 7 Oct 14	Week 8 Oct 21	Week 9 Oct 28	Week 10 Nov 4	Week 11 Nov 11	Week 12 Nov 18	Week 13 Nov 25	Week 14 Dec 2	Week 15 Dec 9	Week 16 (Final) Jan 4	
		None	Dropped: Colorado State; Alabama	Dropped: Wisconsin; Georgia	Dropped: Clemson; Ohio State; Notre Dame; Louisville	Dropped: Oregon State; Mississippi State; Illinois; Michigan State	Dropped: Northwestern; LSU; Toledo	Dropped: Ohio State; Stanford; Kansas State; Texas A&M	Dropped: Clemson; Northwestern; Toledo	Dropped: Auburn; Fresno State	Dropped: Purdue; North Carolina; Texas A&M	Dropped: Georgia Tech; Michigan State	Dropped: Auburn; UCLA; Florida State; Ohio State	Dropped: Georgia Tech; Arkansas; Boston College	Dropped: Marshall; Auburn	None	Dropped: Fresno State; Ohio State	

== Coaches Poll ==
	Preseason Aug 2	Week 1 Aug 28	Week 2 Sep 4	Week 3 Sep 10	Week 4 Sep 24	Week 5 Oct 1	Week 6 Oct 8	Week 7 Oct 15	Week 8 Oct 22	Week 9 Oct 29	Week 10 Nov 5	Week 11 Nov 12	Week 12 Nov 19	Week 13 Nov 26	Week 14 Dec 3	Week 15 Dec 10	Week 16 (Final) Jan 7	
1.	Florida (25)	Florida (0–0) (28)	Florida (1–0) (26)	Miami (FL) (2–0) (29)	Miami (FL) (2–0) (34)	Miami (FL) (3–0) (35)	Miami (FL) (4–0) (25)	Miami (FL) (5–0) (48)	Miami (FL) (5–0) (47)	Miami (FL) (6–0) (46)	Miami (FL) (7–0) (41)	Nebraska (11–0) (30)	Miami (FL) (9–0) (33)	Miami (FL) (10–0) (59)	Miami (FL) (11–0) (59)	Miami (FL) (11–0) (60)	Miami (FL) (12–0) (60)	1.
2.	Miami (FL) (15)	Miami (FL) (0–0) (16)	Miami (FL) (1–0) (22)	Florida (2–0) (19)	Florida (3–0) (14)	Florida (4–0) (16)	Florida (5–0) (25)	Oklahoma (6–0) (11)	Oklahoma (7–0) (13)	Nebraska (9–0) (14)	Nebraska (10–0) (18)	Miami (FL) (8–0) (28)	Nebraska (11–0) (25)	Florida (9–1) (1)	Tennessee (10–1)	Oregon (10–1)	Oregon (11–1)	2.
3.	Oklahoma (8)	Oklahoma (1–0) (10)	Oklahoma (2–0) (9)	Oklahoma (3–0) (7)	Oklahoma (3–0) (9)	Oklahoma (4–0) (8)	Oklahoma (5–0) (10)	Nebraska (7–0) (1)	Nebraska (8–0)	Florida (6–1)	Florida (7–1) (1)	Florida (8–1) (2)	Florida (9–1) (1)	Texas (10–1)	Oregon (10–1)	Colorado (10–2)	Florida (10–2)	3.
4.	Nebraska (6)	Nebraska (1–0) (2)	Nebraska (2–0) (1)	Nebraska (3–0) (2)	Nebraska (4–0) (1)	Nebraska (5–0)	Nebraska (6–0)	Virginia Tech (6–0)	Virginia Tech (6–0)	Oklahoma (7–1)	Oklahoma (8–1)	Oklahoma (9–1)	Oklahoma (10–1)	Tennessee (9–1)	Nebraska (11–1)	Nebraska (11–1)	Tennessee (11–2)	4.
5.	Florida State (1)	Florida State (0–0) (1)	Florida State (1–0)	Florida State (2–0) (1)	Texas (3–0)	Texas (4–0)	Virginia Tech (5–0)	Oregon (6–0)	UCLA (6–0)	Texas (7–1)	Texas (8–1)	Texas (9–1)	Texas (9–1)	Oregon (9–1)	Colorado (10–2)	Florida (9–2)	Texas (11–2)	5.
6.	Texas (2)	Texas (0–0) (2)	Texas (1–0) (1)	Texas (2–0)	Oregon (3–0) (1)	Virginia Tech (4–0)	Oregon (5–0)	UCLA (5–0)	Florida (5–1)	Michigan (6–1)	Tennessee (6–1)	Tennessee (7–1)	Tennessee (8–1)	Nebraska (11–1)	Florida (9–2)	Maryland (10–1)	Oklahoma (11–2)	6.
7.	Tennessee (1)	Oregon (0–0) (1)	Tennessee (1–0)	Oregon (2–0) (1)	Virginia Tech (3–0)	Tennessee (3–0)	UCLA (4–0)	Florida (5–1)	Texas (6–1)	Tennessee (5–1)	Oregon (8–1)	Oregon (9–1)	Oregon (9–1)	BYU (11–0) т	Maryland (10–1)	Illinois (10–1)	Nebraska (11–2)	7.
8.	Oregon (1)	Tennessee (0–0)	Oregon (1–0) (1)	Tennessee (2–0)	Tennessee (2–0)	Oregon (4–0)	Washington (4–0)	Texas (5–1)	Michigan (5–1)	BYU (8–0)	Washington (7–1)	BYU (10–0)	BYU (11–0) (1)	Maryland (10–1) т	BYU (12–0) т	Tennessee (10–2)	LSU (10–3)	8.
9.	Virginia Tech	Virginia Tech (0–0)	Virginia Tech (1–0)	Virginia Tech (2–0)	Kansas State (2–0)	UCLA (4–0)	South Carolina (5–0)	Michigan (5–1)	Tennessee (4–1)	Oregon (7–1)	BYU (9–0)	Maryland (9–1)	Maryland (10–1)	Illinois (10–1)	Illinois (10–1) т	Texas (10–2)	Colorado (10–3)	9.
10.	Michigan (1)	Michigan (0–0)	Michigan (1–0)	Kansas State (1–0)	UCLA (3–0)	Washington (3–0)	Fresno State (5–0)	Fresno State (6–0)	BYU (7–0)	Washington (6–1)	Florida State (6–2)	Washington State (9–1)	Illinois (9–1)	Colorado (9–2)	Texas (10–2)	Oklahoma (10–2)	Maryland (10–2)	10.
11.	Kansas State	Kansas State (0–0)	Kansas State (0–0)	Georgia Tech (3–0)	Georgia Tech (3–0)	Fresno State (5–0) (1)	Texas (4–1)	Tennessee (3–1)	Washington (5–1)	UCLA (6–1)	Maryland (8–1)	Michigan (7–2)	Michigan (8–2)	Oklahoma (10–2)	Oklahoma (10–2)	Stanford (9–2)	Washington State (10–2)	11.
12.	Oregon State	Oregon State (0–0)	Oregon State (0–1)	UCLA (2–0)	Washington (2–0)	South Carolina (4–0)	Michigan (4–1)	Washington (4–1)	Maryland (7–0)	Virginia Tech (6–1)	Washington State (8–1)	Illinois (8–1)	Washington (8–2)	Stanford (8–2)	Stanford (9–2)	LSU (9–3)	Illinois (10–2)	12.
13.	Georgia Tech	Washington (0–0)	Georgia Tech (2–0)	Washington (1–0)	Fresno State (4–0) (1)	Kansas State (2–1)	Florida State (3–1)	BYU (6–0)	Oregon (6–1)	Stanford (5–1)	Michigan (6–2)	Syracuse (8–2)	Stanford (7–2)	Virginia Tech (8–2)	Washington State (9–2)	Washington State (9–2)	South Carolina (9–3)	13.
14.	Washington	Georgia Tech (1–0)	UCLA (1–0)	LSU (2–0)	LSU (2–0)	Florida State (3–1)	Tennessee (3–1)	Maryland (6–0)	South Carolina (6–1)	Florida State (5–2)	Illinois (7–1)	Washington (7–2)	Colorado (8–2)	Washington State (9–2)	South Carolina (8–3)	South Carolina (8–3)	Syracuse (10–3)	14.
15.	UCLA	UCLA (0–0)	Washington (0–0)	Fresno State (3–0) (1)	Florida State (2–1)	Michigan (3–1)	Georgia Tech (4–1)	Clemson (4–1)	Washington State (7–0)	Purdue (5–1)	South Carolina (7–2)	Stanford (6–2)	Virginia Tech (8–2)	South Carolina (8–3)	Michigan (8–3)	Michigan (8–3)	Florida State (8–4)	15.
16.	Notre Dame	LSU (0–0)	LSU (1–0)	Mississippi State (1–0)	South Carolina (3–0)	Northwestern (3–0)	Purdue (4–0)	South Carolina (5–1)	Georgia (5–1)	Maryland (7–1)	UCLA (6–2)	Colorado (8–2)	Washington State (9–2)	Michigan (8–3)	Virginia Tech (8–3)	Virginia Tech (8–3)	Louisville (11–2)	16.
17.	LSU	Notre Dame (0–0)	Notre Dame (0–0)	Michigan (1–1)	Michigan (2–1)	Georgia Tech (3–1)	BYU (5–0)	Colorado (5–1)	Auburn (6–1)	Texas A&M (7–1)	Georgia Tech (6–2)	Virginia Tech (7–2)	Louisville (10–1)	Syracuse (9–3)	Syracuse (9–3)	BYU (12–1)	Stanford (9–3)	17.
18.	Clemson	Clemson (0–0)	Mississippi State (1–0)	Clemson (2–0)	Northwestern (2–0)	BYU (4–0) т	Clemson (3–1)	Washington State (6–0)	Florida State (4–2)	Illinois (6–1)	Syracuse (7–2)	Auburn (7–2)	South Carolina (8–3)	Marshall (10–1)	Georgia (8–3)	Syracuse (9–3)	Virginia Tech (8–4)	18.
19.	Mississippi State	Mississippi State (0–0)	Clemson (1–0)	Northwestern (1–0)	Oregon State (1–1)	Purdue (3–0) т	Texas A&M (5–0)	Georgia (4–1)	Fresno State (6–1)	Washington State (7–1)	Stanford (5–2)	Louisville (9–1)	Georgia Tech (7–3)	Georgia (7–3)	Washington (8–3)	Georgia (8–3)	Washington (8–4)	19.
20.	Northwestern	Northwestern (0–0)	Northwestern (0–0)	South Carolina (2–0)	BYU (3–0)	LSU (2–1)	Maryland (5–0)	Northwestern (4–1)	Purdue (4–1)	South Carolina (6–2)	Colorado (7–2)	Florida State (6–3)	Marshall (9–1)	Washington (8–3)	LSU (8–3)	Washington (8–3)	Michigan (8–4)	20.
21.	Ohio State	Ohio State (0–0)	South Carolina (1–0)	Ohio State (1–0)	Purdue (2–0)	Clemson (3–1)	Kansas State (2–2)	Auburn (5–1)	Georgia Tech (5–2)	Georgia Tech (5–2)	Georgia (5–2)	UCLA (6–3)	Syracuse (8–3)	Fresno State (10–2)	Fresno State (11–2)	Fresno State (11–2)	Marshall (11–2)	21.
22.	South Carolina	South Carolina (0–0)	Ohio State (0–0)	Oregon State (1–1)	Mississippi State (1–1)	Texas A&M (4–0)	Stanford (3–0)	Florida State (3–2)	Stanford (4–1)	Syracuse (7–2)	Virginia Tech (6–2)	South Carolina (7–3)	Fresno State (9–2)	Auburn (7–3)	Louisville (10–2)	Louisville (10–2)	Toledo (10–2)	22.
23.	Wisconsin	Wisconsin (1–0)	Wisconsin (1–1)	Notre Dame (0–1)	Illinois (3–0)	Toledo (4–0)	Toledo (5–0)	Toledo (5–0)	Illinois (6–1)	Georgia (5–2)	Michigan State (5–2)	Georgia Tech (6–3)	Georgia (6–3)	Louisville (10–2)	Ohio State (7–4)	Ohio State (7–4)	Boston College (8–4)	23.
24.	Colorado State	Colorado State (0–0)	Georgia (1–0)	Purdue (1–0)	Michigan State (2–0)	Stanford (3–0)	Northwestern (3–1)	Purdue (4–1)	Texas A&M (6–1)	Clemson (5–2)	Purdue (5–2)	Marshall (8–1)	Auburn (7–3)	LSU (7–3)	Florida State (7–4)	Florida State (7–4)	BYU (12–2)	24.
25.	Alabama	Alabama (0–0)	Purdue (1–0)	BYU (3–0)	Clemson (2–1)	Maryland (4–0)	Ohio State (3–1)	Georgia Tech (4–2)	Clemson (4–2)	Colorado (6–2)	Louisville (8–1)	Fresno State (8–2)	Arkansas (7–3)	Ohio State (7–4)	Marshall (10–2)	Marshall (10–2)	Georgia (8–4)	25.
	Preseason Aug 2	Week 1 Aug 28	Week 2 Sep 4	Week 3 Sep 10	Week 4 Sep 24	Week 5 Oct 1	Week 6 Oct 8	Week 7 Oct 15	Week 8 Oct 22	Week 9 Oct 29	Week 10 Nov 5	Week 11 Nov 12	Week 12 Nov 19	Week 13 Nov 26	Week 14 Dec 3	Week 15 Dec 10	Week 16 (Final) Jan 7	
		None	Dropped: Colorado State; Alabama	Dropped: Wisconsin; Georgia	Dropped: Ohio State; Notre Dame	Dropped: Oregon State; Mississippi State; Illinois; Michigan State	Dropped: LSU	Dropped: Texas A&M; Kansas State; Stanford; Ohio State	Dropped: Colorado; Northwestern; Toledo	Dropped: Auburn; Fresno State	Dropped: Texas A&M; Clemson	Dropped: Georgia; Michigan State; Purdue	Dropped: Florida State; UCLA	Dropped: Georgia Tech; Arkansas	Dropped: Auburn	None	Dropped: Fresno State; Ohio State	

== BCS standings ==
The Bowl Championship Series (BCS) determined the two teams that competed in the BCS National Championship Game, the 2002 Rose Bowl.

	Week 8 Oct 22	Week 9 Oct 29	Week 10 Nov 5	Week 11 Nov 12	Week 12 Nov 19	Week 13 Nov 26	Week 14 Dec 3	Week 15 (Final) Dec 9	
1.	Oklahoma (7–0)	Nebraska (9–0)	Nebraska (10–0)	Nebraska (11–0)	Nebraska (11–0)	Miami (FL) (10–0)	Miami (FL) (11–0)	Miami (FL) (11–0)	1.
2.	Nebraska (8–0)	Oklahoma (7–1)	Miami (FL) (7–0)	Miami (FL) (8–0)	Miami (FL) (9–0)	Florida (9–1)	Tennessee (10–1)	Nebraska (11–1)	2.
3.	UCLA (6–0)	Miami (FL) (6–0)	Oklahoma (8–1)	Oklahoma (9–1)	Oklahoma (10–1)	Texas (10–1)	Nebraska (11–1)	Colorado (10–2)	3.
4.	Miami (FL) (5–0)	Michigan (6–1)	Tennessee (6–1)	Oregon (9–1)	Florida (9–1)	Nebraska (11–1)	Colorado (10–2)	Oregon (10–1)	4.
5.	Virginia Tech (6–0)	Texas (7–1)	Texas (8–1)	Florida (8–1)	Oregon (9–1)	Oregon (9–1)	Oregon (10–1)	Florida (9–2)	5.
6.	Texas (6–1)	Stanford (5–1)	Oregon (8–1)	Texas (9–1)	Texas (9–1)	Tennessee (9–1)	Florida (9–2)	Tennessee (10–2)	6.
7.	Michigan (5–1)	Tennessee (5–1)	Florida (7–1)	Tennessee (7–1)	Tennessee (8–1)	Colorado (9–2)	Texas (10–2)	Texas (10–2)	7.
8.	Maryland (7–0)	Florida (6–1)	Washington (7–1)	Washington State (9–1)	Illinois (9–1)	Illinois (10–1)	Illinois (10–1)	Illinois (10–1)	8.
9.	Tennessee (4–1)	UCLA (6–1)	Washington State (8–1)	Stanford (6–2)	Stanford (7–2)	Oklahoma (10–2)	Stanford (9–2)	Stanford (9–2)	9.
10.	Washington State (7–0)	Oregon (7–1)	Michigan (6–2)	Illinois (8–1)	Michigan (8–2)	Stanford (8–2)	Maryland (10–1)	Maryland (10–1)	10.
11.	Florida (5–1)	Washington (6–1)	Stanford (5–2)	Michigan (7–2)	Washington (8–2)	Maryland (10–1)	Oklahoma (10–2)	Oklahoma (10–2)	11.
12.	Washington (5–1)	Washington State (7–1)	Illinois (7–1)	Maryland (9–1)	Maryland (10–1)	BYU (11–0)	BYU (12–0)	Washington State (9–2)	12.
13.	Oregon (6–1)	BYU (8–0)	BYU (9–0)	BYU (10–0)	BYU (11–0)	Washington State (9–2)	Washington State (9–2)	LSU (9–3)	13.
14.	Stanford (4–1)	Purdue (5–1)	Florida State (6–2)	Colorado (8–2)	Washington State (9–2)	Washington (8–3)	Washington (8–3)	South Carolina (8–3)	14.
15.	South Carolina (6–1)	Virginia Tech (6–1)	Maryland (8–1)	Syracuse (8–2)	Colorado (8–2)	Georgia (7–3)	South Carolina (8–3)	Washington (8–3)	15.
	Week 8 Oct 22	Week 9 Oct 29	Week 10 Nov 5	Week 11 Nov 12	Week 12 Nov 19	Week 13 Nov 26	Week 14 Dec 3	Week 15 (Final) Dec 9	
		Dropped: Maryland; South Carolina	Dropped: UCLA; Purdue; Virginia Tech	Dropped: Washington; Florida State	Dropped: Syracuse	Dropped: Michigan	Dropped: Georgia	Dropped: BYU	
