= 1999 All-Big East Conference football team =

American college football all-star team

The 1999 All-Big East Conference football team consists of American football players chosen as All-Big East Conference players for the 1999 NCAA Division I-A football season. The organizations selecting All-Big East teams in 1999 included the conference's eight head coaches.

The 1999 Virginia Tech Hokies compiled an 11–0 record in the regular season and led the way with eight players on the first team and seven players on the second team. They also swept the Big East awards with quarterback Michael Vick as the offensive players of the year, defensive end Corey Moore as the defensive player of the year, kicker Shayne Graham as the special teams player of the year, and Frank Beamer as the coach of the year.

The Miami Hurricanes compiled a 9–4 record and placed five players on the first team and seven on the second team. Miami's first-team honorees included wide receiver Santana Moss, tight end Bubba Franks, and linebacker Nate Webster.

Boston College placed four players on the first team: running back Cedric Washington, offensive tackle Darnell Alford, defensive lineman Chris Hovan, sand afety Pedro Cirino.

The Pittsburgh Panthers placed three players on the first team: wide receiver Latef Grim, cornerback Hank Poteat, and free safety Ramon Walker.

West Virginia placed running back Avon Cobourne and linebacker Barrett Green on the first team. Quarterback Marc Bulger was named to the second team.

Offensive lineman Shaun O'Hara, who began as a walk-on, was the first Rutgers player to receive first-team honors in four years.

== Offensive selections ==
=== Quarterbacks ===
- Michael Vick, Virginia Tech (Coaches-1)
- Marc Bulger, West Virginia (Coaches-2)

=== Running backs ===
- Shyrone Stith, Virginia Tech (Coaches-1)
- Avon Cobourne, West Virginia (Coaches-1)
- Cedric Washington, Boston College (Coaches-1)
- James Jackson, Miami (FL) (Coaches-2)
- Kevan Barlow, Pitt (Coaches-2)

=== Wide receivers ===
- Latef Grim, Pitt (Coaches-1)
- Santana Moss, Miami (FL) (Coaches-1)
- André Davis, Virginia Tech (Coaches-2)
- Khori Ivy, West Virginia (Coaches-2)

=== Tight ends ===
- Bubba Franks, Miami (FL) (Coaches-1)
- Anthony Becht, West Virginia (Coaches-2)

=== Offensive tackles ===
- Mark Baniewicz, Syracuse (Coaches-1)
- Darnell Alford, Boston College (Coaches-1)
- Tim Leach, Temple (Coaches-2)
- Dave Kadela, Virginia Tech (Coaches-2)

=== Offensive guard ===
- Richard Mercier, Miami (FL) (Coaches-1)
- Shaun O'Hara, Rutgers (Coaches-1)
- Paul Zukauskas, Boston College (Coaches-2)
- Matt Lehr, Virginia Tech (Coaches-2)

=== Centers ===
- Ty Wise, Miami (FL) (Coaches-1)
- Keith Short, Virginia Tech (Coaches-2)

== Defensive selections ==
=== Defensive line ===
- Corey Moore, Virginia Tech (Coaches-1)
- Chris Hovan, Boston College (Coaches-1)
- John Engelberger, Virginia Tech (Coaches-1)
- Duke Pettijohn, Syracuse (Coaches-1)
- Damione Lewis, Miami (Coaches-2)
- Demond Gibson, Pitt (Coaches-2)
- Wayne Hampton, Rutgers (Coaches-2)

=== Linebackers ===
- Barrett Green, West Virginia (Coaches-1)
- Keith Bulluck, Syracuse (Coaches-1)
- Nate Webster, Miami (Coaches-1)
- Michael Hawkes, Virginia Tech (Coaches-2)
- Dan Morgan, Miami (Coaches-2)
- Jamel Smith, Virginia Tech (Coaches-2)
- Frank Chamberlin, Boston College (Coaches-2)

=== Cornerbacks ===
- Hank Poteat, Pitt (Coaches-1)
- Anthony Midget, Virginia Tech (Coaches-1)
- Mike Rumph, Miami (Coaches-2)
- Ike Charlton, Virginia Tech (Coaches-2)

=== Safeties ===
- Ramon Walker, Pitt (Coaches-1)
- Pedro Cirino, Boston College (Coaches-1)
- Ed Reed, Miami (Coaches-2)
- Al Blades, Miami (Coaches-2)

== Special teams ==
=== Kickers ===
- Shayne Graham, Virginia Tech (Coaches-1)
- Jay Taylor, West Virginia (Coaches-2)

=== Punters ===
- Jimmy Kibble, Virginia Tech (Coaches-1)
- Mark Fazzolari, West Virginia (Coaches-2)
- Greg DeBolt, Pitt (Coaches-2)

=== Return specialist ===
- Ricky Hall, Virginia Tech (Coaches-1)
- Santana Moss, Miami (FL) (Coaches-2)

== Individual awards ==
- Offensive player of the year - Michael Vick, Virginia Tech
- Defensive player of the year - Corey Moore, Virginia Tech
- Special teams player of the year - Shayne Graham, Virginia Tech
- Rookie of the year - Michael Vick, Virginia Tech
- Coach of the year - Frank Beamer, Virginia Tech

== Key ==
Coaches, selected by the conference coaches

== See also ==
- 1999 All-America college football team
