= Temple Owls football statistical leaders =

The Temple Owls football statistical leaders are individual statistical leaders of the Temple Owls football program in various categories, including passing, rushing, receiving, total offense, defensive stats, and kicking. Within those areas, the lists identify single-game, single-season, and career leaders. The Owls represent Temple University in the NCAA Division I FBS American Conference.

Although Temple began competing in intercollegiate football in 1894, the school's official record book only includes records from after Temple became a Division I-A (now FBS) program in 1971. Even so, these lists tend to be dominated by more recent players for several reasons:

- Since the 1970s, seasons have increased from 10 games to 11 and then 12 games in length.
- The NCAA didn't allow freshmen to play varsity football until 1972 (with the exception of the World War II years), allowing players to have four-year careers.
- Bowl games only began counting toward single-season and career statistics in 2002. The Owls have played in five bowl games since this decision, giving many recent players an extra game to accumulate statistics.

These lists are updated through the end of the 2025 season.

== Passing ==
=== Passing yards ===
Career
Rk	Player	Yards	Years
1	Phillip Walker	10,669	2013 2014 2015 2016
2	Henry Burris	7,495	1993 1994 1995 1996
3	Anthony Russo	6,287	2018 2019 2020
4	E.J. Warner	6,104	2022 2023
5	Mike McGann	5,967	2001 2002 2003 2004 2005
6	Lee Saltz	5,371	1983 1984 1985 1986
7	Adam DiMichele	5,024	2006 2007 2008
8	Evan Simon	4,129	2024 2025
9	Devin Scott	3,947	1998 1999 2000 2001
10	Doug Shobert	3,913	1970 1971 1972

Single season
Rk	Player	Yards	Year
1	Phillip Walker	3,295	2016
2	E.J. Warner	3,076	2023
3	E.J. Warner	3,028	2022
4	Phillip Walker	2,972	2015
5	Anthony Russo	2,861	2019
6	Henry Burris	2,716	1994
7	Anthony Russo	2,563	2018
8	Phillip Walker	2,317	2014
9	Walter Washington	2,207	2004
10	Brian Broomell	2,103	1979

Single game
Rk	Player	Yards	Year	Opponent
1	E.J. Warner	527	2022	East Carolina
2	E.J. Warner	486	2022	Houston
3	E.J. Warner	472	2023	UTSA
4	Henry Burris	445	1996	Pittsburgh
	Phillip Walker	445	2016	Memphis
6	Anthony Russo	444	2018	UCF
7	Anthony Russo	409	2019	Bucknell
8	E.J. Warner	402	2023	Navy
9	Phillip Walker	396	2016	Wake Forest (Military Bowl)
10	Henry Burris	392	1994	Syracuse

=== Passing touchdowns ===
Career
Rk	Player	TDs	Years
1	Phillip Walker	74	2013 2014 2015 2016
2	Henry Burris	49	1993 1994 1995 1996
3	Anthony Russo	44	2018 2019 2020
4	E.J. Warner	41	2022 2023
5	Adam DiMichele	40	2006 2007 2008
	Evan Simon	40	2024 2025
7	Brian Broomell	35	1976 1977 1978 1979
8	Steve Joachim	31	1973 1974
9	Lee Saltz	29	1983 1984 1985 1986
10	Doug Shobert	26	1970 1971 1972

Single season
Rk	Player	TDs	Year
1	Evan Simon	25	2025
2	E.J. Warner	23	2023
3	Brian Broomell	22	1979
	Phillip Walker	22	2016
5	Henry Burris	21	1994
	Anthony Russo	21	2019
7	Steve Joachim	20	1974
	Phillip Walker	20	2013
9	Phillip Walker	19	2015
10	Adam DiMichele	18	2008
	E.J. Warner	18	2022

Single game
Rk	Player	TDs	Year	Opponent
1	Evan Simon	6	2025	UMass
	Adam DiMichele	6	2008	Eastern Michigan
	Devin Scott	6	1999	Rutgers
4	E.J. Warner	5	2022	East Carolina
	E.J. Warner	5	2023	UTSA
	Evan Simon	5	2024	Utah State
	Evan Simon	5	2025	Tulsa
8	E.J. Warner	4	2023	Navy
	Anthony Russo	4	2020	Memphis
	Anthony Russo	4	2020	South Florida
	Anthony Russo	4	2019	UCF
	Anthony Russo	4	2019	East Carolina
	Frank Nutile	4	2017	Navy
	Phillip Walker	4	2015	SMU
	Phillip Walker	4	2013	Memphis
	Phillip Walker	4	2013	UCF
	Phillip Walker	4	2013	SMU
	Adam DiMichele	4	2008	Eastern Michigan
	Adam DiMichele	4	2008	Bowling Green
	Mac DeVito	4	2001	UConn
	Lee Saltz	4	1985	William and Mary

== Rushing ==
=== Rushing yards ===
Career
Rk	Player	Yards	Years
1	Paul Palmer	4,895	1983 1984 1985 1986
2	Bernard Pierce	3,570	2009 2010 2011
3	Tanardo Sharps	3,260	1999 2000 2001 2002
4	Ryquell Armstead	2,812	2015 2016 2017 2018
5	Matt Brown	2,647	2009 2010 2011 2012
6	Anthony Anderson	2,610	1975 1976 1977 1978
7	Jahad Thomas	2,599	2013 2014 2015 2016
8	Todd McNair	2,383	1985 1986 1987 1988
9	Henry Hynoski	2,218	1972 1973 1974
10	Mark Bright	1,943	1976 1977 1978 1979

Single season
Rk	Player	Yards	Year
1	Paul Palmer	1,866	1986
2	Paul Palmer	1,516	1985
3	Bernard Pierce	1,481	2011
4	Bernard Pierce	1,361	2009
5	Tanardo Sharps	1,267	2002
6	Jahad Thomas	1,262	2015
7	Zachary Dixon	1,153	1978
8	Ryquell Armstead	1,098	2018
9	Todd McNair	1,058	1987
10	Montel Harris	1,054	2012

Single game
Rk	Player	Yards	Year	Opponent
1	Montel Harris	351	2012	Army
2	Paul Palmer	349	1986	East Carolina
3	Paul Palmer	281	1985	William & Mary
4	Bernard Pierce	267	2009	Navy
5	Edward Saydee	265	2022	South Florida
6	Zachary Dixon	241	1978	Cincinnati
7	Paul Palmer	239	1986	Virginia Tech
8	Matt Brown	226	2010	Army
9	Tanardo Sharps	223	2002	Connecticut
10	Anthony Anderson	217	1997	Drake

=== Rushing touchdowns ===
Career
Rk	Player	TDs	Years
1	Bernard Pierce	53	2009 2010 2011
2	Paul Palmer	39	1983 1984 1985 1986
3	Ryquell Armstead	34	2015 2016 2017 2018
4	Jahad Thomas	30	2013 2014 2015 2016
5	Anthony Anderson	22	1975 1976 1977 1978
	Matt Brown	22	2009 2010 2011 2012
7	Walter Washington	21	2003 2004
8	Tanardo Sharps	20	1999 2000 2001 2002
9	Steve Joachim	18	1973 1974
10	Mark Bright	17	1976 1977 1978 1979
	Ramod Lee	17	1995 1996 1997 1998
	Kenneth Harper	17	2011 2012 2013 2014

Single season
Rk	Player	TDs	Year
1	Bernard Pierce	27	2011
2	Jahad Thomas	17	2015
3	Bernard Pierce	16	2009
4	Paul Palmer	15	1986
	Walter Washington	15	2004
6	Ryquell Armstead	14	2016
7	Ryquell Armstead	13	2018
	Jahad Thomas	13	2016
9	Montel Harris	12	2012
10	Anthony Anderson	11	1977

Single game
Rk	Player	TDs	Year	Opponent
1	Montel Harris	7	2012	Army
	Ryquell Armstead	6	2018	Houston
3	Bernard Pierce	5	2011	Maryland
4	Matt Brown	4	2010	Army
	Paul Palmer	4	1984	Cincinnati
	Ryquell Armstead	4	2018	Boston College
	Walter Washington	4	2003	West Virginia
	Sherman Myers	4	1979	Syracuse
9	Kyle Dobbins	3	2021	Wagner
	Bernard Pierce	3	2011	Kent State
	Bernard Pierce	3	2011	Army
	Bernard Pierce	3	2011	Ball State
	Bernard Pierce	3	2011	Akron
	Bernard Pierce	3	2011	Villanova
	Bernard Pierce	3	2009	Miami (OH)
	Bernard Pierce	3	2009	Toledo
	Edward Saydee	3	2022	South Florida
	Walter Washington	3	2004	Syracuse

== Receiving ==
=== Receptions ===
Career
Rk	Player	Rec	Years
1	Ventell Bryant	173	2015 2016 2017 2018
2	Jadan Blue	169	2018 2019 2020 2021
3	Zamir Cobb	165	2000 2001 2002 2003
4	Bruce Francis	138	2005 2006 2007 2008
	Jose Barbon	138	2019 2020 2021 2022
6	Isaiah Wright	135	2016 2017 2018 2019
7	Branden Mack	131	2017 2018 2019 2020
8	Sean Dillard	130	1999 2000 2001 2002
9	Gerald Lucear	126	1977 1978 1979 1980
10	Rich Drayton	122	1987 1988 1989 1990

Single season
Rk	Player	Rec	Year
1	Jadan Blue	95	2019
2	Zamir Cobb	74	2003
3	Jose Barbon	72	2022
4	Robby Anderson	70	2015
5	Clint Graves	63	1972
6	Dante Wright	61	2024
7	Branden Mack	59	2019
8	Ventell Bryant	54	2016
9	Jalen Fitzpatrick	53	2014
10	Carlos Johnson	51	1999
	Sean Dillard	51	2001
	Ventell Bryant	51	2018

Single game
Rk	Player	Rec	Year	Opponent
1	Clint Graves	15	1972	Rhode Island
2	Dante Wright	14	2024	Florida Atlantic
3	Jadan Blue	13	2020	Memphis
	Jose Barbon	13	2022	East Carolina
5	Robby Anderson	12	2015	Houston
	Randle Jones	12	2020	Memphis
7	Clint Graves	11	1972	West Virginia
	Wiley Pitts	11	1978	William & Mary
	Van Johnson	11	1996	Washington State
	Sean Dillard	11	2000	Pittsburgh
	Michael Campbell	11	2010	Ohio
	Ventell Bryant	11	2016	Wake Forest (Military Bowl)
	Jadan Blue	11	2019	South Florida
	Dante Wright	11	2024	Navy

=== Receiving yards ===
Career
Rk	Player	Yards	Years
1	Ventell Bryant	2,444	2015 2016 2017 2018
2	Willie Marshall	2,272	1983 1984 1985 1986
3	Bruce Francis	2,035	2005 2006 2007 2008
4	Gerald Lucear	1,882	1977 1978 1979 1980 1981
5	Van Johnson	1,869	1992 1994 1995 1996
6	Zamir Cobb	1,856	2000 2001 2002 2003
7	Branden Mack	1,819	2017 2018 2019 2020
8	Troy Kersey	1,780	1994 1995 1996 1997
9	Robby Anderson	1,730	2011 2012 2013 2015
10	Rich Drayton	1,693	1987 1988 1989 1990

Single season
Rk	Player	Yards	Year
1	Jadan Blue	1,067	2019
2	Gerald Lucear	964	1979
3	Robby Anderson	939	2015
4	Jose Barbon	918	2022
5	Branden Mack	904	2019
6	Van Johnson	902	1996
7	Ventell Bryant	895	2016
8	Willie Marshall	893	1985
9	Zamir Cobb	866	2003
10	Dante Wright	792	2024

Single game
Rk	Player	Yards	Year	Opponent
1	Robby Anderson	239	2013	SMU
2	Van Johnson	214	1996	Pittsburgh
3	Jason Harper	209	2008	Eastern Michigan
4	Travis Shelton	204	2006	Northern Illinois
5	Rich Drayton	184	1988	Rutgers
	Robby Anderson	184	2013	UCF
7	Willie Marshall	183	1985	Pittsburgh
8	Troy Kersey	178	1996	Eastern Michigan
9	Gerald Lucear	175	1979	Villanova
10	Branden Mack	171	2019	UConn

=== Receiving touchdowns ===
Career
Rk	Player	TDs	Years
1	Bruce Francis	23	2005 2006 2007 2008
2	Gerald Lucear	18	1977 1978 1979 1980 1981
3	Willie Marshall	16	1983 1984 1985 1986
	Robby Anderson	16	2011 2012 2013 2015
5	Van Johnson	15	1992 1994 1995 1996
	Isaiah Wright	15	2016 2017 2018 2019
	Branden Mack	15	2017 2018 2019 2020
8	Zamir Cobb	14	2000 2001 2002 2003
9	Adonis Jennings	13	2015 2016 2017
10	Keith Kirkwood	12	2014 2015 2016 2017

Single season
Rk	Player	TDs	Year
1	Gerald Lucear	13	1979
2	Bruce Francis	13	2008
3	Willie Marshall	9	1985
	Robby Anderson	9	2013
5	Van Johnson	8	1996
	P.J. Cook	8	1994
	Pete Righi	8	1974
8	Robby Anderson	7	2015
	Adonis Jennings	7	2017
	Keith Kirkwood	7	2017
	Branden Mack	7	2019

Single game
Rk	Player	TDs	Year	Opponent
1	Bruce Francis	4	1998	Eastern Michigan
2	Jadan Blue	3	2020	Memphis
	Robby Anderson	3	2013	SMU
	Carlos Johnson	3	1999	Rutgers
	Van Johnson	3	1996	Pittsburgh
	Mike Palys	3	1988	Boston College
	Willie Marshall	3	1985	William & Mary
	Kajiya Hollawayne	3	2025	Tulsa

== Total offense ==
Total offense is the sum of passing and rushing statistics. It does not include receiving or returns.

=== Total offense yards ===
Career
Rk	Player	Yards	Years
1	Phillip Walker	11,432	2013 2014 2015 2016
2	Henry Burris	7,470	1993 1994 1995 1996
3	Anthony Russo	6,312	2018 2019 2020
4	E.J. Warner	6,061	2022 2023
5	Mike McGann	6,045	2001 2002 2003 2004 2005
6	Lee Saltz	5,407	1983 1984 1985 1986
7	Adam DiMichele	5,041	2006 2007 2008
8	Paul Palmer	5,028	1983 1984 1985 1986
9	Walter Washington	4,940	2003 2004
10	Brian Broomell	4,559	1976 1977 1978 1979

Single season
Rk	Player	Yards	Year
1	Phillip Walker	3,195	2016
2	Phillip Walker	3,179	2015
3	Walter Washington	3,096	2004
4	E.J. Warner	3,083	2023
5	E.J. Warner	2,978	2022
6	Anthony Russo	2,797	2019
7	Phillip Walker	2,641	2014
8	Anthony Russo	2,626	2018
9	Henry Burris	2,577	1994
10	Phillip Walker	2,416	2013
11	Brian Broomell	2,352	1979

Single game
Rk	Player	Yards	Year	Opponent
1	E.J. Warner	527	2022	East Carolina
2	Henry Burris	502	1996	Pittsburgh

=== Total touchdowns ===
Career
Rk	Player	TDs	Years
1	Phillip Walker	85	2013 2014 2015 2016
2	Henry Burris	57	1993 1994 1995 1996
3	Bernard Pierce	53	2009 2010 2011
4	Anthony Russo	51	2018 2019 2020
5	Steve Joachim	49	1973 1974
6	Adam DiMichele	45	2006 2007 2008
	Evan Simon	45	2024 2025
8	Brian Broomell	44	1976 1977 1978 1979
9	Paul Palmer	41	1983 1984 1985 1986
10	E.J. Warner	41	2022 2023

Single season
Rk	Player	TDs	Year
1	Steve Joachim	29	1974
2	Bernard Pierce	27	2011
	Evan Simon	27	2025
4	Brian Broomell	26	1979
5	Walter Washington	25	2004
6	Henry Burris	24	1994
7	Phillip Walker	23	2013
	Phillip Walker	23	2016
	Anthony Russo	23	2019
	E.J. Warner	23	2023

Single game
Rk	Player	TDs	Year	Opponent
1	Adam DiMichele	7	2008	Eastern Michigan

== Defense ==
=== Interceptions ===
Career
Rk	Player	Ints	Years
1	Anthony Young	20	1981 1982 1983 1984
2	Mark McCants	15	1977 1978 1979 1980
3	Bob Salla	13	1975 1976 1977
	Kevin Ross	13	1980 1981 1982 1983
5	Delvon Randall	12	2015 2016 2017 2018
6	Bob Mizia	11	1973 1974 1975
	Sam Shaffer	11	1978 1979 1980 1981
8	Terrance Leftwich	10	1999 2000 2001 2002
9	Sean Chandler	10	2014 2015 2016 2017
10	Chonn Lacey	9	1998 1999 2000 2001
	Dominique Harris	9	2006 2007 2008 2009
	Jaiquawn Jarrett	9	2007 2008 2009 2010

Single season
Rk	Player	Ints	Year
1	Sam Shaffer	9	1981
2	Bob Mizia	6	1974
	Mark McCants	6	1980
	Anthony Young	6	1982
	Kevin Harvey	6	1999
6	Tyler Matakevich	5	2015
	Excel Lucas	5	1999
	Anthony Young	5	1984
	Anthony Young	5	1983
	Kevin Ross	5	1982

Single game
Rk	Player	Ints	Year	Opponent
1	Mark McCants	3	1980	Akron

=== Tackles ===
Career
Rk	Player	Tackles	Years
1	Tyler Matakevich	493	2012 2013 2014 2015
2	Steve Conjar	492	1978 1979 1980 1981
3	Lance Johnstone	429	1992 1993 1994 1995
4	Alshermond Singleton	390	1993 1994 1995 1996
5	Taylor Suman	389	1998 1999 2000 2001
6	Joe Klecko	373	1973 1974 1975 1976
7	LeVar Talley	348	1997 1998 1999 2000
8	Mike Curcio	332	1976 1977 1978 1979
9	Rian Wallace	325	2002 2003 2004
10	Loranzo Square	315	1986 1987 1988 1989

Single season
Rk	Player	Tackles	Year
1	Steve Conjar	174	1980
2	Steve Conjar	163	1979
3	Mike Curcio	154	1979
4	Lance Johnstone	153	1995
5	Alshermond Singleton	151	1995
6	Rian Wallace	148	2003
7	Tyler Matakevich	138	2015
8	Tyler Matakevich	137	2013
9	Mike Curcio	136	1978
	Loranzo Square	136	1988

Single game
Rk	Player	Tackles	Year	Opponent
1	Tyler Matakevich	24	2013	Idaho

=== Sacks ===
Career
Rk	Player	Sacks	Years
1	Guy Peters	32.0	1979 1980 1981 1982
2	Dan Klecko	26.0	1999 2000 2001 2002
	Quincy Roche	26.0	2017 2018 2019
4	Adrian Robinson	24.0	2008 2009 2010 2011
5	Praise Martin-Oguike	19.0	2014 2015 2016
6	Haason Reddick	18.0	2013 2014 2015 2016
7	Tim Hanley	18.0	1982 1983 1984
8	Jeffrey Ward	17.5	1983 1984 1985 1986
9	Muhammad Wilkerson	17.5	2008 2009 2010
10	Junior Galette	17.0	2006 2007 2008
	Vinnie Mini	17.0	1980 1981 1982

Single season
Rk	Player	Sacks	Year
1	Adrian Robinson	13.0	2009
	Quincy Roche	13.0	2019
3	Colin McCarty	11.0	1980
4	Haason Reddick	10.5	2016
5	Guy Peters	10.0	1979
	Guy Peters	10.0	1981
	Dan Klecko	10.0	2002
8	Muhammad Wilkerson	9.5	2010
9	James Harris	9.0	1991
	Lance Johnstone	9.0	1992
	Michael Tripp	9.0	1997
	Layton Jordan	9.0	2022

Single game
Rk	Player	Sacks	Year	Opponent
1	Decara Burgess	4.0	1997	Pittsburgh
	Dan Klecko	4.0	2002	Connecticut

== Kicking ==
=== Field goals ===
Career
Rk	Player	FGs	Years
1	Brandon McManus	60	2009 2010 2011 2012
2	Austin Jones	50	2014 2015 2016 2017
3	Bill Wright	46	1985 1986 1987 1988
4	Cap Poklemba	36	1999 2000 2001 2002
5	Don Bitterlich	35	1973 1974 1975
6	Nick Mike-Mayer	33	1970 1971 1972
7	Aaron Boumerhi	31	2016 2017
8	Bob Wright	28	1988 1989 1990
9	Will Mobley	26	2018 2019 2020
10	Bob Clauser	25	1978 1980 1981 1982

Single season
Rk	Player	FGs	Year
1	Austin Jones	23	2015
2	Don Bitterlich	21	1975
3	Bob Wright	19	1990
4	Brandon McManus	17	2009
5	Bill Wright	16	1986
	Bill Wright	16	1987
	Brandon McManus	16	2011
	Maddux Trujillo	16	2024
9	Aaron Boumerhi	15	2016
	Aaron Boumerhi	15	2017

Single game
Rk	Player	FGs	Year	Opponent
1	Bob Clauser	5	1982	Delaware
	Bob Wright	5	1990	Boston College
	Cap Poklemba	5	2002	Pittsburgh
4	Jake Brownell	4	2007	Kent State
	Brandon McManus	4	2010	Villanova
	Aaron Boumerhi	4	2016	Wake Forest (Military Bowl)
	Camden Price	4	2022	South Florida
	Maddux Trujillo	4	2024	Florida Atlantic

=== Field goal percentage ===
Career
Rk	Player	FG%	Years
1	Carl Hardin	78.6%	2025
2	Camden Price	76.9%	2022 2023
3	Austin Jones	74.6%	2014 2015 2016 2017
4	Will Mobley	74.3%	2017 2018 2019 2020
5	Bob Wright	73.7%	1988 1989 1990
6	Maddux Trujillo	72.7%	2024
7	Brandon McManus	72.3%	2009 2010 2011 2012
8	Aaron Boumerhi	72.1%	2016 2017 2018
9	Cap Poklemba	72.0%	1999 2000 2001 2002
10	Don Bitterlich	61.4%	1973 1974 1975

Single season
Rk	Player	FG%	Year
1	Camden Price	92.9%	2022
2	Aaron Boumerhi	88.2%	2016
3	Brandon McManus	82.4%	2012
4	Austin Jones	82.1%	2015
5	Will Mobley	78.6%	2019
	Carl Hardin	78.6%	2025
7	Bob Wright	76.0%	1990
8	Bob Clauser	75.0%	1982
9	Will Mobley	73.3%	2018
10	Bill Wright	72.7%	1986
	Brandon McManus	72.7%	2011
	Maddux Trujillo	72.7%	2024
