= 1999 Pittsburgh Panthers football team =

American college football season

1999 Pittsburgh Panthers football
- Conference: Big East Conference
- Record: 5–6 (2–5 Big East)
- Head coach: Walt Harris (3rd season)
- Offensive scheme: West Coast
- Defensive coordinator: Larry Coyer (3rd season)
- Base defense: Multiple 4–3
- Home stadium: Pitt Stadium

1999 Big East Conference football standings
	Conf.			Overall
Team	W		L	W		L
No. 2 Virginia Tech $	7	–	0	11	–	1
No. 15 Miami (FL)	6	–	1	9	–	4
Boston College	4	–	3	8	–	4
Syracuse	3	–	4	7	–	5
West Virginia	3	–	4	4	–	7
Pittsburgh	2	–	5	5	–	6
Temple	2	–	5	2	–	9
Rutgers	1	–	6	1	–	10
$ – BCS representative as conference champion; Rankings from AP Poll

The 1999 Pittsburgh Panthers football team represented the University of Pittsburgh in the 1999 NCAA Division I-A football season. The 1999 season was the final year that The Panthers played in the aging Pitt Stadium. The final game at Pitt Stadium was on November 13, 1999, when The Panthers defeated Notre Dame 37–27.

== Schedule ==
Date	Time	Opponent	Site	TV	Result	Attendance
September 4	3:30 p.m.	Bowling Green*	Pitt Stadium; Pittsburgh, PA		W 30–10	30,560
September 11	12:00 p.m.	at No. 2 Penn State*	Beaver Stadium; University Park, PA (rivalry)	ESPN	L 17–20	96,127
September 18	12:00 p.m.	Kent State*	Pitt Stadium; Pittsburgh, PA	ESPN Plus	W 30–23	29,840
October 2	3:30 p.m.	Temple^{†}	Pitt Stadium; Pittsburgh, PA		W 55–24	40,534
October 7	8:00 p.m.	No. 17 Syracuse	Pitt Stadium; Pittsburgh, PA ' (rivalry)	ESPN	L 17–24	45,455
October 16	5:00 p.m.	at Boston College	Alumni Stadium; Chestnut Hill, MA	ESPN2	L 16–20	33,574
October 23	12:00 p.m.	at Rutgers	Rutgers Stadium; Piscataway, NJ	ESPN Plus	W 38–15	17,325
October 30	7:00 p.m.	No. 3 Virginia Tech	Pitt Stadium; Pittsburgh, PA	ESPN2	L 17–30	42,678
November 6	12:00 p.m.	No. 22 Miami (FL)	Pitt Stadium; Pittsburgh, PA	ESPN Plus	L 3–33	38,710
November 13	3:30 p.m.	Notre Dame*	Pitt Stadium; Pittsburgh, PA (rivalry)	CBS	W 37–27	60,190
November 27	12:00 p.m.	West Virginia	Mountaineer Field; Morgantown, WV (Backyard Brawl)	ESPN	L 21–52	40,660
*Non-conference game; ^{†}Homecoming; Rankings from AP Poll released prior to the game; All times are in Eastern time

== Personnel ==
=== Roster ===
1999 Pittsburgh Panthers football team roster
Players
Coaches
Offense

Pos.	#	Name	Class
OL	77	Bryan Anderson	Fr
RB	43	Kevan Barlow	Jr
WR	80	Antonio Bryant	So
TE	93	Benjamin Kopp	Sr
WR	6	Julius Dixon	Sr
OL	72	Khiawatha Downey	Fr
WR	84	R. J. English	So

Defense

Pos.	#	Name	Class
DE	57	Bryan Knight	So
DB	31	Hank Poteat	Sr
DB	25	Ramon Walker	Fr

Special teams

Pos.	#	Name	Class

Head coach

- Walt Harris

Coordinators/assistant coaches

Legend

- (C) Team captain
- (S) Suspended
- (I) Ineligible
- Injured
- Redshirt

Roster
Last update: 1999-11-09

=== Coaching staff ===
1999 Pittsburgh Panthers football staff
Coaching staff: Walt Harris – Head coach/offensive coordinator; Larry Coyer – Defensive coordinator; J.D. Brookhart – Wide receivers/special teams Assistant; Curt Cignetti – Tight ends; Bryan Deal – Recruiting doordinator/Specialists; Tom Freeman – Offensive line; Bob Junko – Defensive tackles; Bill McGovern – Defensive backs; Vincent White – Running backs; Brian Williams – Defensive ends/Special teams	Support staff: Chris LaSala – Director of football operations; Joe Moorhead – Graduate assistant; Sean McGowan – Graduate assistant	Strength and conditioning staff: Buddy Morris – Strength and conditioning coach; Chad Hutsko – Assistant strength and conditioning coach

== Team players drafted into the NFL ==
Player	Position	Round	Pick	NFL club
Hank Poteat	Defensive back	3	77	Pittsburgh Steelers
