= 1999 Boston College Eagles football team =

American college football season

1999 Boston College Eagles football

Insight.com Bowl, L 28–62 vs. Colorado
- Conference: Big East Conference
- Record: 8–4 (4–3 Big East)
- Head coach: Tom O'Brien (3rd season)
- Offensive coordinator: Dana Bible (1st season)
- Offensive scheme: Pro-style
- Defensive coordinator: Frank Spaziani (1st season)
- Base defense: 4–3
- Captains: Pedro Cirino; Chris Hovan; Butch Palaza
- Home stadium: Alumni Stadium

1999 Big East Conference football standings
	Conf.			Overall
Team	W		L	W		L
No. 2 Virginia Tech $	7	–	0	11	–	1
No. 15 Miami (FL)	6	–	1	9	–	4
Boston College	4	–	3	8	–	4
Syracuse	3	–	4	7	–	5
West Virginia	3	–	4	4	–	7
Pittsburgh	2	–	5	5	–	6
Temple	2	–	5	2	–	9
Rutgers	1	–	6	1	–	10
$ – BCS representative as conference champion; Rankings from AP Poll

The 1999 Boston College Eagles football team represented Boston College during the 1999 NCAA Division I-A football season. Boston College was a member of the Big East Conference. The Eagles played their home games in 1999 at Alumni Stadium in Chestnut Hill, Massachusetts, which has been their home stadium since 1957.

== Schedule ==
Date	Time	Opponent	Rank	Site	TV	Result	Attendance
September 4	12:00 p.m.	Baylor*		Alumni Stadium; Chestnut Hill, MA	ESPN	W 30–29 ^{OT}	39,756
September 18	12:00 p.m.	at Navy*		Navy–Marine Corps Memorial Stadium; Annapolis, MD	FSN	W 14–10	34,052
September 25	12:00 p.m.	at Rutgers		Rutgers Stadium; Piscataway, NJ	ESPN+	W 27–7	27,330
October 2	12:00 p.m.	Northeastern*		Alumni Stadium; Chestnut Hill, MA		W 33–22	42,302
October 9	1:00 p.m.	at Temple		Veterans Stadium; Philadelphia, PA		L 14–24	15,067
October 16	5:00 p.m.	Pittsburgh		Alumni Stadium; Chestnut Hill, MA	ESPN2	W 20–16	33,574
October 23	12:00 p.m.	No. 23 Miami (FL)		Alumni Stadium; Chestnut Hill, MA	CBS	L 28–31	44,084
October 30	12:00 p.m.	at Syracuse		Carrier Dome; Syracuse, NY	ESPN+	W 24–23	48,487
November 13	12:00 p.m.	West Virginia		Alumni Stadium; Chestnut Hill, MA	ESPN	W 34–17	42,335
November 20	2:30 p.m.	at Notre Dame*	No. 25	Notre Dame Stadium; Notre Dame, IN (Holy War)	NBC	W 31–29	80,012
November 26	2:30 p.m.	at No. 2 Virginia Tech	No. 22	Lane Stadium; Blacksburg, VA (rivalry)	CBS	L 14–38	53,130
December 31	1:30 p.m.	vs. Colorado*	No. 25	Arizona Stadium; Tucson, AZ (Insight.com Bowl)	ESPN2	L 28–62	35,762
*Non-conference game; Rankings from AP Poll released prior to the game; All times are in Eastern time

== Roster ==
1999 Boston College Eagles football team roster
Players
Coaches
Offense

Pos.	#	Name	Class
OT	76	Darnell Alford	Sr
TE	86	Bryan Arndt	Sr
WR	29	Chris Barnes	Fr
OL	71	Leo Bell	Fr
WR	9	Derrick Crittenden	Sr
OT	75	Marc Colombo	So
RB	1	William Green	Fr
QB	7	Tim Hasselbeck	Jr
QB	2	Brian St. Pierre	Fr
G	66	Paul Zukauskas	Jr

Defense

Pos.	#	Name	Class
DB	18	Doug Bessette	Fr
LB	37	Nick Blevins	So
LB	54	Scott Bradley	So
LB	44	Frank Chamberlin	Sr
DB	36	Brian Flores	Fr
DT	95	Chris Hovan	Sr
DL	88	Adam Newman	Sr
DB	28	Jonathan Ordway	So
LB	45	Josh Ott	Fr
DB	40	George White	Sr

Special teams

Pos.	#	Name	Class

Head coach

- Tom O'Brien

Coordinators/assistant coaches

- Mike Siravo (GA)

Legend

- (C) Team captain
- (S) Suspended
- (I) Ineligible
- Injured
- Redshirt

Roster
Last update: 1999-10-13

== 1999 team players in the NFL ==
The following players were claimed in the 2000 NFL draft.

Player	Position	Round	Pick	NFL club
Chris Hovan	Defensive tackle	1	26	Minnesota Vikings
