= 1999 Syracuse Orangemen football team =

American college football season

1999 Syracuse Orangemen football

Music City Bowl champion

Music City Bowl, W 20–13 vs. Kentucky
- Conference: Big East Conference
- Record: 7–5 (3–4 Big East)
- Head coach: Paul Pasqualoni (9th season)
- Offensive coordinator: George DeLeone (11th season)
- Defensive coordinator: Chris Rippon (1st season)
- Captains: Mark Baniewicz; Keith Bulluck; Donald Dinkins; Quinton Spotwood; Nate Trout
- Home stadium: Carrier Dome

1999 Big East Conference football standings
	Conf.			Overall
Team	W		L	W		L
No. 2 Virginia Tech $	7	–	0	11	–	1
No. 15 Miami (FL)	6	–	1	9	–	4
Boston College	4	–	3	8	–	4
Syracuse	3	–	4	7	–	5
West Virginia	3	–	4	4	–	7
Pittsburgh	2	–	5	5	–	6
Temple	2	–	5	2	–	9
Rutgers	1	–	6	1	–	10
$ – BCS representative as conference champion; Rankings from AP Poll

The 1999 Syracuse Orangemen football team represented Syracuse University as a member of the Big East Conference during the 1999 NCAA Division I-A football season. Led by ninth-year head coach Paul Pasqualoni, the Orangemen compiled an overall record of 7–5 with a mark of 3–4 in conference play, tying for fourth place in the Big East. Syracuse was invited to the Music City Bowl, where the Orangemen defeated Kentucky. The team played home games at the Carrier Dome in Syracuse, New York.

== Schedule ==
Date	Time	Opponent	Rank	Site	TV	Result	Attendance	Source
September 2	8:00 pm	at Toledo*		Glass Bowl; Toledo, OH	ESPN Plus	W 35–12	27,900	
September 11	8:00 pm	Central Michigan*		Carrier Dome; Syracuse, NY		W 47–7	45,563	
September 18	8:00 pm	No. 6 Michigan*		Carrier Dome; Syracuse, NY	CBS	L 13–18	49,249	
September 25	3:30 pm	West Virginia		Carrier Dome; Syracuse, NY (rivalry)	CBS	W 30–7	44,890	
October 2	1:30 pm	Tulane*	No. 22	Carrier Dome; Syracuse, NY		W 47–17	48,286	
October 7	8:00 pm	at Pittsburgh	No. 18	Pitt Stadium; Pittsburgh, PA (rivalry)	ESPN	W 24–17	45,455	
October 16	6:00 pm	at No. 4 Virginia Tech	No. 16	Lane Stadium; Blacksburg, VA (College GameDay)	ESPN	L 0–62	53,130	
October 30	12:00 pm	Boston College		Carrier Dome; Syracuse, NY	ESPN Plus	L 23–24	48,487	
November 6	12:00 pm	Temple		Carrier Dome; Syracuse, NY	ESPN Plus	W 27–10	43,970	
November 13	12:00 pm	at Rutgers		Rutgers Stadium; Piscataway, NJ	ESPN Plus	L 21–24	17,919	
November 27	3:30 pm	at Miami (FL)		Miami Orange Bowl; Miami, FL	CBS	L 13–45	35,208	
December 29	4:00 pm	vs. Kentucky*		Adelphia Coliseum; Nashville, TN (Music City Bowl)	ESPN	W 20–13	59,221	
*Non-conference game; Rankings from AP Poll released prior to the game; All times are in Eastern time

== Roster ==
1999 Syracuse Orange football team roster
Players
Coaches
Offense

Pos.	#	Name	Class
RB	23	James Mungro	So

Defense

Pos.	#	Name	Class
DB	25	Will Allen	Jr
LB	33	Keith Bulluck	Sr
DE	54	Dwight Freeney	So

Special teams

Pos.	#	Name	Class

Head coach

- Paul Pasqualoni

Coordinators/assistant coaches

- Jerry Azzinaro (defensive line / recruiting coordinator)

Legend

- (C) Team captain
- (S) Suspended
- (I) Ineligible
- Injured
- Redshirt
