= 2001 West Virginia Mountaineers football team =

American college football season

2001 West Virginia Mountaineers football
- Conference: Big East Conference
- Record: 3–8 (1–6 Big East)
- Head coach: Rich Rodriguez (1st season)
- Offensive scheme: Spread option
- Defensive coordinator: Phil Elmassian (1st season)
- Base defense: 4–3
- Home stadium: Mountaineer Field

2001 Big East Conference football standings
	Conf.			Overall
Team	W		L	W		L
No. 1 Miami (FL) $#	7	–	0	12	–	0
No. 14 Syracuse	6	–	1	10	–	3
No. 18 Virginia Tech	4	–	3	8	–	4
No. 21 Boston College	4	–	3	8	–	4
Pittsburgh	4	–	3	7	–	5
Temple	2	–	5	4	–	7
West Virginia	1	–	6	3	–	8
Rutgers	0	–	7	2	–	9
# – BCS National Champion; $ – BCS representative as conference champion; Rankings from AP Poll

The 2001 West Virginia Mountaineers football team represented West Virginia University as a member of the Big East Conference during the 2001 NCAA Division I-A football season. Led by first-year head coach Rich Rodriguez, the Mountaineers compiled an overall record of 3–8 with a mark of 1–6 in conference play, placing seventh in the Big East. The team played home games at Mountaineer Field in Morgantown, West Virginia.

The Mountaineers suffered their worst season since 1978. The season's lowest point was a home loss to Temple, West Virginia's first loss to the Owls since 1984 and first loss at home to Temple since 1979.

== Schedule ==
Date	Time	Opponent	Site	TV	Result	Attendance
September 1	12:00 p.m.	at Boston College	Alumni Stadium; Chestnut Hill, MA	ABC	L 10–34	42,482
September 8	1:00 p.m.	Ohio*	Mountaineer Field; Morgantown, WV	MSN	W 20–3	52,995
September 22	1:00 p.m.	Kent State*	Mountaineer Field; Morgantown, WV	MSN	W 34–14	47,458
September 29	12:00 p.m.	at Maryland*	Byrd Stadium; College Park, MD	MSN	L 20–32	40,166
October 6	12:00 p.m.	No. 8 Virginia Tech	Mountaineer Field; Morgantown, WV	ESPN2	L 0–35	63,271
October 13	2:30 p.m.	at Notre Dame*	Notre Dame Stadium; Notre Dame, IN	NBC	L 24–34	80,795
October 25	7:30 p.m.	at No. 1 Miami (FL)	Miami Orange Bowl; Miami, FL	ESPN2	L 3–45	44,411
November 3	1:00 p.m.	Rutgers	Mountaineer Field; Morgantown, WV	MSN	W 80–7	44,685
November 10	12:00 p.m.	at No. 18 Syracuse	Carrier Dome; Syracuse, NY (rivalry)	ESPN Plus	L 13–24	43,753
November 17	1:00 p.m.	Temple	Mountaineer Field; Morgantown, WV	MSN	L 14–17	37,120
November 24	12:00 p.m.	Pittsburgh	Mountaineer Field; Morgantown, WV (Backyard Brawl)	ESPN	L 17–23	44,407
*Non-conference game; Rankings from AP Poll released prior to the game; All times are in Eastern time

== Roster ==
2001 West Virginia Mountaineers football team roster
Players
Coaches
Offense

Pos.	#	Name	Class
RB	22	Avon Cobourne	Jr
RB, LB	34	Corey McIntyre	Sr
OT	77	Lance Nimmo	Jr

Defense

Pos.	#	Name	Class
LB	32	Ben Collins	Jr
DB	19	Lance Frazier	So
DT	87	Antwan Lake	Sr
LB	6	Grant Wiley	So

Special teams

Pos.	#	Name	Class

Head coach

- Rich Rodriguez

Coordinators/assistant coaches

Legend

- (C) Team captain
- (S) Suspended
- (I) Ineligible
- Injured
- Redshirt
