= 2001 Pittsburgh Panthers football team =

American college football season

2001 Pittsburgh Panthers football

Tangerine Bowl champion

Tangerine Bowl, W 34–19 vs. NC State
- Conference: Big East Conference
- Record: 7–5 (4–3 Big East)
- Head coach: Walt Harris (5th season)
- Offensive coordinator: J. D. Brookhart (2nd season)
- Offensive scheme: West Coast
- Defensive coordinator: Paul Rhoads (2nd season)
- Base defense: Multiple 4–3
- Home stadium: Heinz Field

2001 Big East Conference football standings
	Conf.			Overall
Team	W		L	W		L
No. 1 Miami (FL) $#	7	–	0	12	–	0
No. 14 Syracuse	6	–	1	10	–	3
No. 18 Virginia Tech	4	–	3	8	–	4
No. 21 Boston College	4	–	3	8	–	4
Pittsburgh	4	–	3	7	–	5
Temple	2	–	5	4	–	7
West Virginia	1	–	6	3	–	8
Rutgers	0	–	7	2	–	9
# – BCS National Champion; $ – BCS representative as conference champion; Rankings from AP poll

The 2001 Pittsburgh Panthers football team represented the University of Pittsburgh in the 2001 NCAA Division I-A football season.

== Schedule ==
Date	Time	Opponent	Site	TV	Result	Attendance	Source
September 1	6:00 p.m.	East Tennessee State*	Heinz Field; Pittsburgh, PA		W 31–0	47,919	
September 8	1:30 p.m.	South Florida*	Heinz Field; Pittsburgh, PA		L 26–35	39,542	
September 27	8:00 p.m.	No. 1 Miami (FL)	Heinz Field; Pittsburgh, PA	ESPN	L 21–43	57,224	
October 6	2:30 p.m.	at Notre Dame*	Notre Dame Stadium; Notre Dame, IN (rivalry)	NBC	L 7–24	80,795	
October 13	12:00 p.m.	Syracuse^{†}	Heinz Field; Pittsburgh, PA (rivalry)	ESPN Plus	L 10–42	52,367	
October 20	12:00 p.m.	at Boston College	Alumni Stadium; Chestnut Hill, MA	ESPN Plus	L 7–45	41,637	
October 27	12:00 p.m.	at Temple	Veterans Stadium; Philadelphia, PA		W 33–7	12,859	
November 3	12:00 p.m.	No. 12 Virginia Tech	Heinz Field; Pittsburgh, PA	ESPN Plus	W 38–7	55,585	
November 10	1:30 p.m.	at Rutgers	Rutgers Stadium; Piscataway, NJ		W 42–0	13,520	
November 24	12:00 p.m.	at West Virginia	Mountaineer Field; Morgantown, WV (Backyard Brawl)	ESPN	W 23–17	44,407	
December 1	1:30 p.m.	UAB*	Heinz Field; Pittsburgh, PA		W 24–6	40,855	
December 20	7:30 p.m.	vs. NC State*	Florida Citrus Bowl; Orlando, FL (Tangerine Bowl)	ESPN	W 34–19	28,562	
*Non-conference game; ^{†}Homecoming; Rankings from AP Poll released prior to the game; All times are in Eastern time

== Roster ==
2001 Pittsburgh Panthers football team roster
Players
Coaches
Offense

Pos.	#	Name	Class
QB	11	David Priestley	Sr
QB	12	Rod Rutherford	So
OL	77	Bryan Anderson	Jr
WR	80	Antonio Bryant	Jr
OT	75	Matt Morgan	Fr
RB	32	Lousaka Polite	So
TE	83	Kris Wilson	So

Defense

Pos.	#	Name	Class
DB	5	Torrie Cox	Jr
LB	51	Gerald Hayes	Jr
DE	57	Bryan Knight	Sr
DB	19	Shawntae Spencer	So
DB	25	Ramon Walker	Sr

Special teams

Pos.	#	Name	Class
P	36	Andy Lee	So

Head coach

- Walt Harris

Coordinators/assistant coaches

Legend

- (C) Team captain
- (S) Suspended
- (I) Ineligible
- Injured
- Redshirt

== Coaching staff ==
2001 Pittsburgh Panthers football staff
Coaching staff: Walt Harris – Head coach; Bob Junko – Assistant head coach/defensive tackles; J. D. Brookhart – Offensive coordinator/Wide receivers; Paul Rhoads – Defensive coordinator/secondary; David Blackwell – Linebackers; Curtis Bray – Defensive ends; Bryan Deal – Recruiting coordinator/Specialists; Tom Freeman – Offensive line/run game coordinator; Bob Ligashesky – Tight ends/Special teams; Shawn Simms – Running backs	Support staff: Chris LaSala – Assistant Athletic Director/football operations; Matt Williamson – Recruiting Assistant; Sean McGowan – Graduate assistant; Bob Ando – Graduate assistant	Strength and conditioning staff: Buddy Morris – Strength and conditioning coach; Chad Hutsko – Assistant strength and conditioning coach

== Team players drafted into the NFL ==
Player	Position	Round	Pick	NFL club
Antonio Bryant	Wide receiver	2	63	Dallas Cowboys
Ramon Walker	Defensive back	5	153	Houston Texans
Bryan Knight	Linebacker	5	165	Chicago Bears

== Notes ==
- The December 1 game against UAB was a makeup of games that were postponed due to the 9/11 terror attacks cancelling all major sporting events for one week.
