= 1999 West Virginia Mountaineers football team =

American college football season

1999 West Virginia Mountaineers football
- Conference: Big East Conference
- Record: 4–7 (3–4 Big East)
- Head coach: Don Nehlen (20th season)
- Offensive coordinator: Dan Simrell (5th season)
- Defensive coordinator: Steve Dunlap (8th season)
- Home stadium: Mountaineer Field

1999 Big East Conference football standings
	Conf.			Overall
Team	W		L	W		L
No. 2 Virginia Tech $	7	–	0	11	–	1
No. 15 Miami (FL)	6	–	1	9	–	4
Boston College	4	–	3	8	–	4
Syracuse	3	–	4	7	–	5
West Virginia	3	–	4	4	–	7
Pittsburgh	2	–	5	5	–	6
Temple	2	–	5	2	–	9
Rutgers	1	–	6	1	–	10
$ – BCS representative as conference champion; Rankings from AP Poll

The 1999 West Virginia Mountaineers football team represented West Virginia University as a member of the Big East Conference during the 1999 NCAA Division I-A football season. Led by 20th-year head coach Don Nehlen, the Mountaineers compiled an overall record of 4–7 with a mark of 3–4 in conference play, tying for fourth place in the Big East. The team played home games at Mountaineer Field in Morgantown, West Virginia.

== Schedule ==
Date	Time	Opponent	Site	TV	Result	Attendance
September 4	3:00 p.m.	at East Carolina*	Ericsson Stadium; Charlotte, NC	ESPN2	L 23–30	47,860
September 11	12:00 p.m.	Miami (OH)*	Mountaineer Field; Morgantown, WV	ESPN Plus	W 43–27	43,799
September 18	12:00 p.m.	at Maryland*	Byrd Stadium; College Park, MD (rivalry)	ESPN2	L 0–33	33,169
September 25	3:30 p.m.	at Syracuse	Carrier Dome; Syracuse, NY (rivalry)	CBS	L 7–30	44,890
October 2	12:00 p.m.	Navy*	Mountaineer Field; Morgantown, WV	ESPN Plus	L 28–31	52,875
October 16	1:00 p.m.	Rutgers	Mountaineer Field; Morgantown, WV	MSN	W 62–16	44,223
October 23	1:00 p.m.	Temple	Mountaineer Field; Morgantown, WV	MSN	W 20–17	34,908
October 30	12:00 p.m.	at No. 23 Miami (FL)	Miami Orange Bowl; Miami, FL	CBS	L 20–28	30,310
November 6	3:30 p.m.	No. 3 Virginia Tech	Mountaineer Field; Morgantown, WV (rivalry)	CBS	L 20–22	56,906
November 13	12:00 p.m.	at Boston College	Alumni Stadium; Chestnut Hill, MA	ESPN	L 17–34	42,335
November 27	12:00 p.m.	Pittsburgh	Mountaineer Field; Morgantown, WV (Backyard Brawl)	ESPN	W 52–21	40,660
*Non-conference game; Rankings from AP Poll released prior to the game; All times are in Eastern time

== Roster ==
1999 West Virginia Mountaineers football team roster
Players
Coaches
Offense

Pos.	#	Name	Class
WR	1	Jerry Porter	Sr
QB	4	Marc Bulger	Sr
WR	8	Khori Ivy	Sr
RB	20	Cooper Rego	So
WR	21	Pat Greene	Sr
RB	22	Avon Cobourne	Fr
RB, LB	34	Corey McIntyre	Jr
FB	40	Wes Ours	Jr
OT	77	Lance Nimmo	Fr
WR	81	James Norton	Sr
TE	82	Anthony Becht	Sr

Defense

Pos.	#	Name	Class
LB	32	Ben Collins	So
LB	33	Barrett Green	Sr
LB	41	Chris Edmonds	Jr
LB	43	Ryan Brady	Sr
DT	87	Antwan Lake	Jr

Special teams

Pos.	#	Name	Class
K	47	Jay Taylor	Sr

Head coach

- Don Nehlen

Coordinators/assistant coaches

Legend

- (C) Team captain
- (S) Suspended
- (I) Ineligible
- Injured
- Redshirt
