= 2001 Boston College Eagles football team =

American college football season

2001 Boston College Eagles football
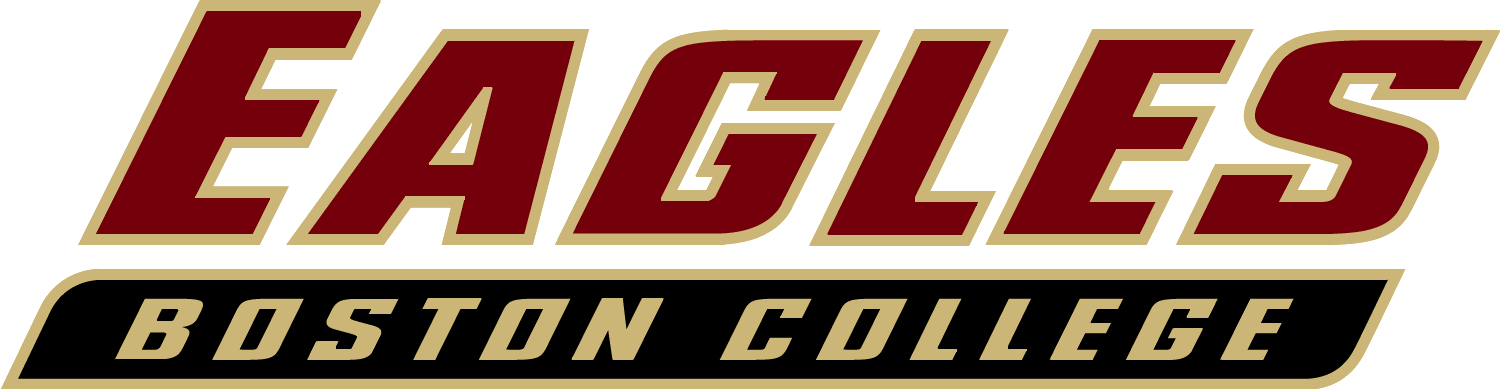

Music City Bowl champion

Music City Bowl, W 20–16 vs. Georgia
- Conference: Big East Conference

Ranking
- Coaches: No. 23
- AP: No. 21
- Record: 8–4 (4–3 Big East)
- Head coach: Tom O'Brien (5th season)
- Offensive coordinator: Dana Bible (3rd season)
- Offensive scheme: Pro-style
- Defensive coordinator: Frank Spaziani (3rd season)
- Base defense: 4–3
- Captains: Scott Bradley; Marc Colombo; Sean Guthrie
- Home stadium: Alumni Stadium

2001 Big East Conference football standings
	Conf.			Overall
Team	W		L	W		L
No. 1 Miami (FL) $#	7	–	0	12	–	0
No. 14 Syracuse	6	–	1	10	–	3
No. 18 Virginia Tech	4	–	3	8	–	4
No. 21 Boston College	4	–	3	8	–	4
Pittsburgh	4	–	3	7	–	5
Temple	2	–	5	4	–	7
West Virginia	1	–	6	3	–	8
Rutgers	0	–	7	2	–	9
# – BCS National Champion; $ – BCS representative as conference champion; Rankings from AP Poll

The 2001 Boston College Eagles football team represented Boston College during the 2001 NCAA Division I-A football season. Boston College was a member of the Big East Conference. The Eagles played their home games at Alumni Stadium in Chestnut Hill, Massachusetts, which has been their home stadium since 1957.

== Schedule ==
Date	Time	Opponent	Rank	Site	TV	Result	Attendance
September 1	12:00 p.m.	West Virginia		Alumni Stadium; Chestnut Hill, MA	ABC	W 34–10	42,482
September 8	10:00 p.m.	at Stanford*		Stanford Stadium; Stanford, CA	FSN	L 22–38	41,250
September 22	12:00 p.m.	at Navy*		Navy–Marine Corps Memorial Stadium; Annapolis, MD		W 38–21	30,064
September 29	12:00 p.m.	Army*		Alumni Stadium; Chestnut Hill, MA	ESPN+	W 31–10	43,042
October 6	3:30 p.m.	Temple		Alumni Stadium; Chestnut Hill, MA	ESPN+	W 33–10	38,724
October 13	6:30 p.m.	at No. 6 Virginia Tech		Lane Stadium; Blacksburg, VA (rivalry)	ESPN2	L 20–34	53,662
October 20	12:00 p.m.	Pittsburgh		Alumni Stadium; Chestnut Hill, MA	ESPN+	W 45–7	41,637
October 27	7:45 p.m.	Notre Dame*		Alumni Stadium; Chestnut Hill, MA (Holy War)	ESPN	W 21–17	44,500
November 10	12:00 p.m.	No. 1 Miami (FL)		Alumni Stadium; Chestnut Hill, MA	ABC	L 7–18	44,500
November 17	12:00 p.m.	at Rutgers		Rutgers Stadium; Piscataway, NJ	ESPN+	W 38–7	13,012
November 24	7:00 p.m.	at No. 22 Syracuse	No. 25	Carrier Dome; Syracuse, NY	ESPN2	L 28–39	45,063
December 28	5:30 p.m.	vs. No. 16 Georgia*		Adelphia Coliseum; Nashville, TN (Music City Bowl)	ESPN	W 20–16	46,125
*Non-conference game; Rankings from AP Poll released prior to the game; All times are in Eastern time

== Roster ==
2001 Boston College Eagles football team roster
Players
Coaches
Offense

Pos.	#	Name	Class
OT	75	Marc Colombo	Sr
RB	1	William Green	Jr
C	77	Dan Koppen	Jr
TE	89	Sean Ryan	So
G	76	Chris Snee	So
QB	2	Brian St. Pierre	Jr
QB	15	Quinton Porter	Fr

Defense

Pos.	#	Name	Class
LB	40	Vinny Ciurciu	Jr
DE	85	Antonio Garay	Sr
CB	9	Lenny Walls	Sr

Special teams

Pos.	#	Name	Class

Head coach

- Tom O'Brien

Coordinators/assistant coaches

Legend

- (C) Team captain
- (S) Suspended
- (I) Ineligible
- Injured
- Redshirt

Roster

== Game summaries ==
=== Miami (FL) ===
Miami (FL) at Boston College

Team	1	2	3	4	Total
• No. 1 Hurricanes	0	9	0	9	18
Eagles	0	0	7	0	7

- Date: November 10
- Location: Alumni Stadium, Chestnut Hill, MA
- Game start: 12:15 pm EST
- Elapsed time: 3:10
- Game attendance: 44,500
- Game weather: 50 °F (10 °C), Mostly Cloudy, Wind SW 15–25 mph (24–40 km/h)
- Referee: Tom DeJoseph
- Television network: ABC

Scoring summary
2	14:56	MIA	Todd Sievers 38-yard field goal	MIA 3–0
2	8:45	MIA	Sievers 24-yard field goal	MIA 6–0
2	0:54	MIA	Sievers 43-yard field goal	MIA 9–0
3	5:50	BC	Sean Ryan 9-yard pass from Brian St. Pierre (Kevin McMyler kick)	MIA 9–7
4	14:50	MIA	Sievers 47-yard field goal	MIA 12–7
4	0:13	MIA	Ed Reed 80-yard interception return (kick failed)	MIA 18–7

== Drafted Players (2002 NFL Draft) ==
2002	1	16	16	William Green	Cleveland Browns	RB
2002	1	29	29	Marc Colombo	Chicago Bears	T
