= 1999 Rutgers Scarlet Knights football team =

American college football season

1999 Rutgers Scarlet Knights football
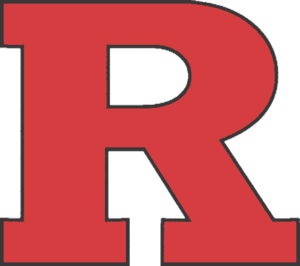
- Conference: Big East Conference
- Record: 1–10 (1–6 Big East)
- Head coach: Terry Shea (4th season)
- Offensive coordinator: Terry Shea (4th season)
- Defensive coordinator: Dennis Creehan (2nd season)
- Home stadium: Rutgers Stadium

1999 Big East Conference football standings
| | Conf. | | | Overall |
| Team | W | | L | W | | L |
|---|---|---|---|---|---|---|
| No. 2 Virginia Tech $ | 7 | – | 0 | 11 | – | 1 |
| No. 15 Miami (FL) | 6 | – | 1 | 9 | – | 4 |
| Boston College | 4 | – | 3 | 8 | – | 4 |
| Syracuse | 3 | – | 4 | 7 | – | 5 |
| West Virginia | 3 | – | 4 | 4 | – | 7 |
| Pittsburgh | 2 | – | 5 | 5 | – | 6 |
| Temple | 2 | – | 5 | 2 | – | 9 |
| Rutgers | 1 | – | 6 | 1 | – | 10 |
$ – BCS representative as conference champion; Rankings from AP Poll

The 1999 Rutgers Scarlet Knights football team represented Rutgers University in the 1999 NCAA Division I-A football season. The Scarlet Knights were led by fourth-year head coach Terry Shea and played their home games at Rutgers Stadium. They were a member of the Big East Conference. They finished the season 1–10, 1–6 in Big East play.

== Schedule ==
| Date | Time | Opponent | Site | TV | Result | Attendance |
|---|---|---|---|---|---|---|
| September 4 | 5:30 pm | at California* | California Memorial Stadium; Berkeley, California | | L 7–21 | 35,200 |
| September 11 | 8:00 pm | No. 23 Texas* | Rutgers Stadium; Piscataway, New Jersey | ESPN2 | L 21–38 | 41,511 |
| September 25 | 12:00 pm | Boston College | Rutgers Stadium; Piscataway, New Jersey | ESPN+ | L 7–27 | 27,330 |
| October 2 | 6:30 pm | at Wake Forest* | Groves Stadium; Winston-Salem, North Carolina | | L 10–17 | 20,772 |
| October 9 | 6:00 pm | No. 5 Virginia Tech | Rutgers Stadium; Piscataway, New Jersey | | L 20–58 | 30,764 |
| October 16 | 1:00 pm | at West Virginia | Mountaineer Field; Morgantown, West Virginia | | L 16–62 | 44,223 |
| October 23 | 12:00 pm | Pittsburgh | Rutgers Stadium; Piscataway, New Jersey | ESPN+ | L 15–38 | 17,325 |
| October 30 | 1:00 pm | at Temple | Veterans Stadium; Philadelphia | | L 28–56 | 16,873 |
| November 6 | 2:00 pm | Navy* | Rutgers Stadium; Piscataway, New Jersey | | L 7–34 | 20,339 |
| November 13 | 12:00 pm | Syracuse | Rutgers Stadium; Piscataway, New Jersey | ESPN+ | W 24–21 | 17,919 |
| November 20 | 12:00 pm | at Miami (FL) | Miami Orange Bowl; Miami | | L 0–55 | 21,167 |
*Non-conference game; Rankings from Coaches' Poll released prior to the game; All times are in Eastern time

== Roster ==
1999 Rutgers Scarlet Knights football team roster
Players
Coaches
Offense 74 B. French OL Sr. 6-4 315 Crossland / Temple Hill, MD 75 S. Mitchell OL So. 6-7 320 Milford Academy / Fort Wayne, IN 76 K. Kaczorowski OL Fr. 6-6 305 Hillside / Hillside, NJ 81 Sean Carty WR Fr. 6-1 190 Somerville, Somerville, NJ 82 Aaron Martin DB Fr. 6-4 195 Bergen Catholic / Ringwood, NJ 83 Josh Hobbs WR Fr. 6-2 190 Somerville / Somerville, NJ 84 Phil Douglas WR So. 5-11 180 Lakewood / Lakewood, NJ

| Pos. | # | Name | Class |
|---|---|---|---|
| QB | 17 | Mike McMahon | Jr |
| OL | 63 | Mike DeLucia | Sr |
| OL | 64 | Iosefa Puaauli | Sr |
| OL | 65 | Jeremy Womack | So |
| OL | 66 | Shaun O'Hara | Sr |
| OL | 69 | Howard Blackwood | So |
| OL | 70 | Tim Baker | Sr |
| OL | 71 | Randy Smith | Sr |
| OL | 73 | Brian Duffy | Fr |
| OL | 78 | Mike Esposito | So |
| WR | 80 | Errol Johnson | Jr |
| TE | 85 | L. J. Smith | So |
| WR | 86 | Walter King | Sr |

Defense 44 Roger Wingate OLB Sr. 6-1 200 Hillside / Hillside, NJ 45 Ken Whiteside LB Fr. 6-3 210 Dwight Morrow / Englewood, NJ 51 Jack Bloom DE Jr. 6-4 230 Toms River South / Toms River, NJ 52 R. Crawford DE Jr.

| Pos. | # | Name | Class |
|---|---|---|---|
| LB | 41 | Gary Brackett | Fr |
| S | 42 | Brian Bender | Fr |
| DE | 43 | Jesse Sullivan | Fr |
| ILB | 46 | Steve Berson | Fr |
| LB | 47 | Tarell Freeney | Jr |
| ILB | 48 | Mike Pridgeon | Sr |
| OLB | 49 | Dax Strohmeyer | Sr |
| DL | 77 | Karl Mayall | Jr |

Special teams

| Pos. | # | Name | Class |

Head coach

- Terry Shea

Coordinators/assistant coaches

Legend

- (C) Team captain
- (S) Suspended
- (I) Ineligible
- Injured
- Redshirt

Roster
