= 1999 Insight.com Bowl =

- 11th Insight.com Bowl
Colorado Buffaloes	Boston College Eagles
(6–5)	(8–3)
Big 12	Big East
62	28
Head coach: Gary Barnett	Head coach: Tom O'Brien
	AP / Coaches; 25 / 22
	1	2	3	4	Total
Colorado	21	24	10	7	62
Boston College	0	7	7	14	28
- Date: December 31, 1999
- Season: 1999
- Stadium: Arizona Stadium
- Location: Tucson, Arizona
- Attendance: 35,762

United States TV coverage
- Network: ESPN
- Announcers: Mike Tirico, Rod Gilmore, Jerry Punch

The 1999 Insight.com Bowl was the 11th edition of the Insight.com Bowl. It featured the Colorado Buffaloes and the Boston College Eagles.

== Game Summary ==
=== 1st Quarter ===
Colorado started off with a 10-yard touchdown run from Cortlen Johnson thus making it 7–0 Colorado. Mike Moschetti's 2 yard touchdown run made it 14–0. Colorado's Jason Sykes intercepted a Boston College pass, and returned it 29 yards for a touchdown, making it 21-0 Colorado, to close the 1st quarter scoring.

=== 2nd Quarter ===
In the second quarter, Colorado's Rashidi Barnes intercepted a Boston College pass, and returned it 21 yards for a touchdown, making it 28-0. Ben Kelly later scored on an 88-yard punt return for Colorado giving them a 35-0 lead. With Colorado driving again, Boston College's George White intercepted a Colorado pass and returned it 78 yards for a score making it 35–7. Cortlen Johnson added a 2-yard touchdown for Colorado to make it 42–7. Jeremy Aldrich's 26 yard field goal made it 45–7 Colorado at the half.

=== 3rd Quarter ===
In the third quarter, Jeremy Aldrich drilled a 21-yard field goal, making the score 48–7 Colorado. Boston College's Bryan Ardnt recovered a fumble in the end zone to make it 48–14. Colorado's Roman Hollowell scored on an 18-yard touchdown run to make it 55–14 Colorado at the end of three quarters.

=== 4th Quarter ===
Colorado's Zac Colvin rushed 4 yards for a touchdown to make it 62–14. Boston College's Tim Hasselbeck threw a 2-yard touchdown pass to Jamal Burke to make it 62–21. Doug Bessette scored on a 9-yard return of a blocked punt for Boston College, to make the final score 62–28.

== Aftermath ==
Colorado's 62 points was an Insight Bowl record. Boston College won eight straight bowl games after this loss.
