= 2001 Tangerine Bowl =

American college football game

2001 Visit Florida Tangerine Bowl
- Bowl Game
NC State Wolfpack	Pittsburgh Panthers
(7-4)	(6-5)
ACC	Big East
19	34
Head coach: Chuck Amato	Head coach: Walt Harris
	1	2	3	4	Total
NC State	3	7	0	9	19
Pittsburgh	3	21	3	7	34
- Date: December 20, 2001
- Season: 2001
- Stadium: Florida Citrus Bowl
- Location: Orlando, Florida
- MVP: WR Antonio Bryant (Pittsburgh)
- Referee: Rogers Redding (SEC)
- Attendance: 28,562
- Payout: US$750,000 per team

United States TV coverage
- Network: ESPN
- Announcers: Mike Tirico (play-by-play); Kirk Herbstreit (Analyst); Lee Corso (Analyst); Jerry Punch (sideline)

The 2001 Visit Florida Tangerine Bowl was the 12th edition to the college football bowl game, succeeding the MicronPC.com bowl. It featured the NC State Wolfpack and the Pittsburgh Panthers. This was the first year since 1982 that the Tangerine Bowl was played; the original version is now known as the Citrus Bowl.

== Game summary ==
Scoring began in the first quarter with the two teams trading field goals. Early in the second quarter, Pittsburgh wide receiver Antonio Bryant caught a touchdown pass on an 80-yard drive to take the lead 10–3. On their next possession, Bryant caught another touchdown on a 99-yard drive. North Carolina State countered with a 90-yard kickoff return for a touchdown by Gregory Golden, but the Panthers then scored another touchdown as time expired to go into halftime with a 24–10 lead.

Coming out of the half, Pittsburgh scored another field goal for the only points of the 3rd quarter to make it 27–10, but the Wolfpack put together two scoring drives for a touchdown and a field goal to make it 27–19 in the 4th. NC State had one last opportunity to tie or take the lead on a late possession, but quarterback Philip Rivers was sacked, lost the football, and Pittsburgh scooped it up for a score, winning 34–19.

- Pittsburgh - Lotz 27-yard field goal, 10:36, 1st
- North Carolina State - Kiker 32-yard field goal, 2:16, 1st
- Pittsburgh - Priestley-Bryant 15-yard pass (Lotz kick), 10:17, 2nd
- Pittsburgh - Priestley-Bryant 2-yard pass (Lotz kick), 4:06, 2nd
- North Carolina State - Greg Golden 90-yard kick return (Kiker kick), 3:48, 2nd
- Pittsburgh - Rutherford 1-yard run (Lotz kick), :20, 2nd
- Pittsburgh - Lotz 33-yard field goal, 10:22, 3rd
- North Carolina State - Rivers-Edwards 5-yard pass (kick failed), 14:56, 4th
- North Carolina State - Kiker 19-yard field goal, 9:39, 4th
- Pittsburgh - Young 16-yard fumble recovery, 6:15, 4th
