= 2001 Rutgers Scarlet Knights football team =

American college football season

2001 Rutgers Scarlet Knights football
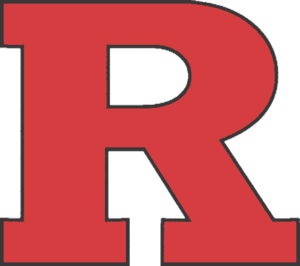
- Conference: Big East Conference
- Record: 2–9 (0–7 Big East)
- Head coach: Greg Schiano (1st season)
- Offensive coordinator: Bill Cubit (1st season)
- Offensive scheme: Pro-style
- Defensive coordinator: Paul Ferraro (1st season)
- Base defense: 4–3
- Home stadium: Rutgers Stadium

2001 Big East Conference football standings
	Conf.			Overall
Team	W		L	W		L
No. 1 Miami (FL) $#	7	–	0	12	–	0
No. 14 Syracuse	6	–	1	10	–	3
No. 18 Virginia Tech	4	–	3	8	–	4
No. 21 Boston College	4	–	3	8	–	4
Pittsburgh	4	–	3	7	–	5
Temple	2	–	5	4	–	7
West Virginia	1	–	6	3	–	8
Rutgers	0	–	7	2	–	9
# – BCS National Champion; $ – BCS representative as conference champion; Rankings from AP Poll

The 2001 Rutgers Scarlet Knights football team represented Rutgers University in the 2001 NCAA Division I-A football season. The Scarlet Knights were led by new head coach Greg Schiano and played their home games at Rutgers Stadium. They were a member of the Big East Conference. They finished the season 2–9, 0–7 in Big East play to finish in last place. Due to the September 11 attacks, Rutgers' September 15 home game against California was postponed until November 23.

== Schedule ==
Date	Time	Opponent	Site	TV	Result	Attendance	Source
August 30	7:30 pm	at Buffalo*	University at Buffalo Stadium; Buffalo, NY		W 31–15	22,658	
September 8	4:00 pm	at No. 1 Miami (FL)	Miami Orange Bowl; Miami, FL		L 0–61	39,804	
September 22	12:00 pm	No. 9 Virginia Tech	Rutgers Stadium; Piscataway, NJ	ESPN Plus	L 0–50	27,514	
September 29	7:00 pm	Connecticut*	Rutgers Stadium; Piscataway, NJ		L 19–20	24,415	
October 6	12:00 pm	Syracuse	Rutgers Stadium; Piscataway, NJ	ESPN Plus	L 17–24	17,511	
October 13	4:00 pm	at Temple	Veterans Stadium; Philadelphia, PA	ESPN Plus	L 5–30	19,861	
October 20	3:30 pm	Navy*	Rutgers Stadium; Piscataway, NJ	ESPN Plus	W 23–17	29,101	
November 3	1:00 pm	at West Virginia	Mountaineer Field; Morgantown, WV		L 7–80	44,685	
November 10	1:30 pm	Pittsburgh	Rutgers Stadium; Piscataway, NJ		L 0–42	13,520	
November 17	12:00 pm	Boston College	Rutgers Stadium; Piscataway, NJ	ESPN Plus	L 7–38	13,012	
November 23	1:00 pm	California*	Rutgers Stadium; Piscataway, NJ		L 10–20	18,111	
*Non-conference game; Rankings from AP Poll released prior to the game; All times are in Eastern time

== Roster ==
2001 Rutgers Scarlet Knights football team roster
Players			Coaches
Offense: Pos. / # / Name / Class	Defense: Pos. / # / Name / Class	Special teams: Pos. / # / Name / Class; P / 13 / Mike Barr / Jr	Head coach: Greg Schiano; Coordinators/assistant coaches: Ben Albert - Defensive line; Legend: (C) Team captain; (S) Suspended; (I) Ineligible; Injured; Redshirt
