= 1999 Temple Owls football team =

American college football season

1999 Temple Owls football
- Conference: Big East Conference
- Record: 2–9 (2–5 Big East)
- Head coach: Bobby Wallace (2nd season)
- Offensive coordinator: Tim Stowers (1st season)
- Defensive coordinator: Raymond Monica (2nd season)
- Home stadium: Veterans Stadium; Franklin Field

1999 Big East Conference football standings
	Conf.			Overall
Team	W		L	W		L
No. 2 Virginia Tech $	7	–	0	11	–	1
No. 15 Miami (FL)	6	–	1	9	–	4
Boston College	4	–	3	8	–	4
Syracuse	3	–	4	7	–	5
West Virginia	3	–	4	4	–	7
Pittsburgh	2	–	5	5	–	6
Temple	2	–	5	2	–	9
Rutgers	1	–	6	1	–	10
$ – BCS representative as conference champion; Rankings from AP Poll

The 1999 Temple Owls football team represented Temple University as a member of the Big East Conference during the 1999 NCAA Division I-A football season. Led by second-year head coach Bobby Wallace, the Owls compiled an overall record of 2–9 with a mark of 2–5 in conference play, tying for sixth place in the Big East. Temple played home games at Veterans Stadium and Franklin Field in Philadelphia.

== Schedule ==
Date	Time	Opponent	Site	TV	Result	Attendance	Source
September 2	6:00 pm	Maryland*	Franklin Field; Philadelphia, PA		L 0–6	25,322	
September 11	7:00 pm	at No. 17 Kansas State*	KSU Stadium; Manhattan, KS		L 0–40	50,624	
September 18	3:00 pm	at Akron*	Rubber Bowl; Akron, OH		L 15–25	10,980	
September 25	8:00 pm	at No. 21 Marshall*	Marshall University Stadium; Huntington, WV	FSNP	L 0–34	30,194	
October 2	3:30 pm	at Pittsburgh	Pitt Stadium; Pittsburgh, PA		L 24–55	40,534	
October 9	1:00 pm	Boston College^{†}	Franklin Field; Philadelphia, PA		W 24–14	15,067	
October 23	1:00 pm	at West Virginia	Mountaineer Field; Morgantown, WV		L 17–20	34,908	
October 30	1:00 pm	Rutgers	Veterans Stadium; Philadelphia, PA		W 56–28	16,873	
November 6	12:00 pm	at Syracuse	Carrier Dome; Syracuse, NY	ESPN Plus	L 10–27	43,970	
November 20	12:00 pm	No. 2 Virginia Tech	Veterans Stadium; Philadelphia, PA	ESPN2	L 7–62	25,822	
December 4	4:00 pm	at No. 23 Miami (FL)	Miami Orange Bowl; Miami, FL		L 0–55	20,319	
*Non-conference game; ^{†}Homecoming; Rankings from AP Poll released prior to the game; All times are in Eastern time
