= 2001 Navy Midshipmen football team =

American college football season

2001 Navy Midshipmen football
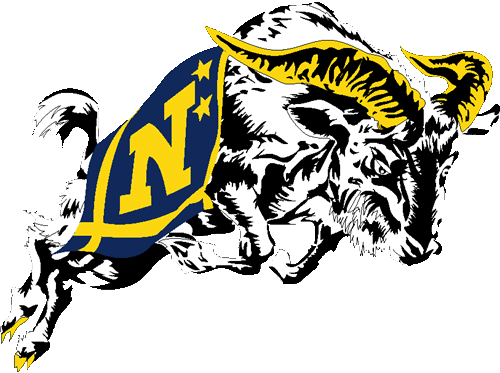
- Conference: Independent
- Record: 0–10
- Head coach: Charlie Weatherbie (7th season; first 7 games); Rick Lantz (interim; final 3 games)
- Offensive coordinator: Mark Hudspeth (1st season)
- Offensive scheme: Triple option
- Defensive coordinator: Rick Lantz (1st season)
- Base defense: 4–3
- MVP: Ed Malinowski
- Captains: Ed Malinowski; Jake Bowen
- Home stadium: Navy–Marine Corps Memorial Stadium

2001 NCAA Division I-A independents football records
	Conf.			Overall
Team	W		L	W		L
South Florida		–		8	–	3
Troy State		–		7	–	4
UCF		–		6	–	5
Notre Dame		–		5	–	6
Utah State		–		4	–	7
Connecticut		–		2	–	9
Navy		–		0	–	10
Rankings from AP Poll

The 2001 Navy Midshipmen football team represented the United States Naval Academy (USNA) as an independent during the 2001 NCAA Division I-A football season. The team was led by head coach Charlie Weatherbie for most of the year. He was replaced by Rick Lantz for the last three games of the season.

== Schedule ==
Date	Time	Opponent	Site	TV	Result	Attendance	Source
August 30	7:00 p.m.	at Temple	Franklin Field; Philadelphia, PA		L 26–45	26,191	
September 8	12:00 p.m.	No. 10 Georgia Tech	Navy–Marine Corps Memorial Stadium; Annapolis, MD	FSN	L 7–70	30,602	
September 15		at Northwestern*	Ryan Field; Evanston, IL		Canceled		
September 22	12:00 p.m.	Boston College	Navy–Marine Corps Memorial Stadium; Annapolis, MD		L 21–38	30,064	
October 6		vs. Air Force	FedExField; Landover, MD (Commander-in-Chief's Trophy)		L 18–24	36,251	
October 13	12:00 p.m.	Rice^{†}	Navy–Marine Corps Memorial Stadium; Annapolis, MD		L 13–21	29,106	
October 20	3:30 p.m.	at Rutgers	Rutgers Stadium; Piscataway, NJ	ESPN+	L 17–23	29,101	
October 27	7:00 p.m.	at Toledo	Glass Bowl; Toledo, OH		L 20–21	36,852	
November 10	12:00 p.m.	Tulane	Navy–Marine Corps Memorial Stadium; Annapolis, MD		L 28–42	31,456	
November 17	1:00 p.m.	at Notre Dame	Notre Dame Stadium; Notre Dame, IN (rivalry)	NBC	L 16–34	80,795	
December 1	12:00 p.m.	vs. Army	Veterans Stadium; Philadelphia, PA (Army–Navy Game)		L 17–26		
*Non-conference game; ^{†}Homecoming; Rankings from AP Poll released prior to the game; All times are in Eastern time

== Roster ==
2001 Navy Midshipmen football team roster
Players
Coaches
Offense

Pos.	#	Name	Class
WR	3	Dominic Bailey	Jr
QB	11	Craig Candeto	So
TE	87	Steve Mercer	Jr
WR	14	J.P. Blecksmith	Jr
WR	6	Chandler Sims	Jr
TE	89	Jim Zakar	Jr
LS/TE	86	Heath Sanders	Jr
OL	77	David Walsh	Jr
OL	78	Grant Moody	Jr
OL	65	Derek Jaskowiak	Jr
OL	71	Matt Nye	Jr
C	75	Brian Schulz	Sr
C	76	Ben Eastburn	Jr
C	67	Shane Todd	So
OL	61	Travis Peace	Jr
OL	72	Brett Cochrane	Jr
OL	64	John Jeffery	Sr
OL	68	Dan Venuto	Sr
OL	63	Sean Magee	So
WR	40	Jeff Gaddy	Sr
WR	84	Mike McIlravy	Jr
SB	5	Gene Reese	Jr
SB	21	Tony Lane	So
SB	45	Jeff Lam	Sr
QB	10	Ed Malinowski (C)	Sr
SB	39	Donnie Fricks	Jr
SB	35	Brad Tepper	Jr
SB	37	Brendan Looney	So
FB	32	Raheem Lambert	Sr
FB	23	Marlon Terrell	Sr
FB	24	Bryce McDonald	Jr

Defense

Pos.	#	Name	Class
DE	96	Pete Beuttenmuller	Jr
DT	97	Andy Zetts	Jr
DT	54	Josh Brindel	Jr
DT	99	Joey Owmby	Jr
DE	47	Dan Person	Jr
DE	95	Ralph Henry	So
LB	56	Eddie Carthan	So
LB	49	Mike Chiesl	Sr
LB	48	Brian Stann	Jr
LB	1	Jake Bowen (C)	Sr
LB	58	Ryan Hamilton (C)	Sr
LB	50	Ben Matthews	So
LB	51	Dan Ryno	Sr
CB	16	Shalimar Brazier	So
SS	44	Lenter Thomas	Jr
SS	13	Joey Fay	Jr
S	9	Matt Brooks	Sr
S	7	DeJuan Cromer	Sr
CB	17	Marcus Jackson	Sr
S	33	Clyde Clark	Jr

Special teams

Pos.	#	Name	Class
LS	86	Heath Sanders	Jr
PK	4	David Hills	Sr
P	82	John Skaggs	So

Head coach

- Rick Lantz

Coordinators/assistant coaches

Legend

- (C) Team captain
- (S) Suspended
- (I) Ineligible
- Injured
- Redshirt

Roster
