= 2013 Temple Owls football team =

American college football season

2013 Temple Owls football
- Conference: American Athletic Conference
- Record: 2–10 (1–7 The American)
- Head coach: Matt Rhule (1st season)
- Offensive coordinator: Marcus Satterfield (1st season)
- Offensive scheme: Spread
- Defensive coordinator: Phil Snow (1st season)
- Base defense: 4–3
- Home stadium: Lincoln Financial Field

2013 American Athletic Conference football standings
	Conf.			Overall
Team	W		L	W		L
No. 10 UCF $	8	–	0	12	–	1
No. 15 Louisville	7	–	1	12	–	1
Cincinnati	6	–	2	9	–	4
Houston	5	–	3	8	–	5
SMU	4	–	4	5	–	7
Rutgers	3	–	5	6	–	7
UConn	3	–	5	3	–	9
South Florida	2	–	6	2	–	10
Memphis	1	–	7	3	–	9
Temple	1	–	7	2	–	10
$ – BCS representative as conference champion; Rankings from AP Poll

The 2013 Temple Owls football team represented Temple University in the 2013 NCAA Division I FBS football season. The Owls were led by first-year head coach Matt Rhule and played their home games at Lincoln Financial Field. They were members of the American Athletic Conference. They finished the season 2–10, 1–7 in American Athletic play to finish in a tie for ninth place.

== Schedule ==
Date	Time	Opponent	Site	TV	Result	Attendance
August 31	3:30 p.m.	at No. 14 Notre Dame*	Notre Dame Stadium; Notre Dame, IN	NBC	L 6–28	80,795
September 7	12:00 p.m.	Houston	Lincoln Financial Field; Philadelphia, PA	AAN	L 13–22	27,328
September 14	1:00 p.m.	Fordham*	Lincoln Financial Field; Philadelphia, PA	ESPN3	L 29–30	20,047
September 28	5:00 p.m.	at Idaho*	Kibbie Dome; Moscow, ID	ALT	L 24–26	15,323
October 5	12:00 p.m.	No. 7 Louisville	Lincoln Financial Field; Philadelphia, PA	AAN	L 7–30	21,709
October 11	8:30 p.m.	at Cincinnati	Nippert Stadium; Cincinnati, OH	ESPN	L 20–38	32,220
October 19	1:00 p.m.	Army*^{†}	Lincoln Financial Field; Philadelphia, PA	ESPN3	W 33–14	25,533
October 26	3:00 p.m.	at SMU	Gerald J. Ford Stadium; University Park, TX	ESPN3	L 49–59	15,786
November 2	12:00 p.m.	at Rutgers	High Point Solutions Stadium; Piscataway, NJ	AAN	L 20–23	46,447
November 16	12:00 p.m.	No. 15 UCF	Lincoln Financial Field; Philadelphia, PA	AAN	L 36–39	20,174
November 23	7:00 p.m.	UConn	Lincoln Financial Field; Philadelphia, PA	ESPN3	L 21–28	20,045
November 30	12:00 p.m.	at Memphis	Liberty Bowl Memorial Stadium; Memphis, TN	ESPNews	W 41–21	25,671
*Non-conference game; ^{†}Homecoming; Rankings from AP Poll released prior to the game; All times are in Eastern time

== Game summaries ==
=== At Notre Dame ===
	1	2	3	4	Total
Owls	0	6	0	0	6
#14 Fighting Irish	14	7	7	0	28

=== Houston ===
	1	2	3	4	Total
Cougars	3	6	6	7	22
Owls	6	7	0	0	13

=== Fordham ===
	1	2	3	4	Total
Rams	3	10	7	10	30
Owls	0	7	7	15	29

=== At Idaho ===
	1	2	3	4	Total
Owls	3	0	7	14	24
Vandals	7	10	3	6	26

=== Louisville ===
	1	2	3	4	Total
#7 Cardinals	10	14	3	3	30
Owls	0	0	0	7	7

=== At Cincinnati ===
	1	2	3	4	Total
Owls	13	7	0	0	20
Bearcats	7	21	10	0	38

=== Army ===
	1	2	3	4	Total
Black Knights	0	0	7	7	14
Owls	14	12	7	0	33

=== At SMU ===
	1	2	3	4	Total
Owls	14	14	7	14	49
Mustangs	7	7	21	24	59

This game was the first in the series that ended with an actual winner. With the loss, Temple fell to 1-7.

=== At Rutgers ===
	1	2	3	4	Total
Owls	6	7	0	7	20
Scarlet Knights	0	3	6	14	23

=== UCF ===
	1	2	3	4	Total
#15 Knights	5	17	0	17	39
Owls	0	21	7	8	36

=== UConn ===
	1	2	3	4	Total
Huskies	0	0	14	14	28
Owls	7	14	0	0	21

=== At Memphis ===
	1	2	3	4	Total
Owls	3	14	14	10	41
Tigers	0	7	14	0	21
