= Brian Broomell =

American gridiron football player (born 1958)

No. 9, 12
- Position: Quarterback

Personal information
- Born: June 26, 1958 (age 68)
- Listed height: 6 ft 1 in (1.85 m)
- Listed weight: 190 lb (86 kg)

Career information
- High school: Sterling (Somerdale, New Jersey)
- College: Temple
- NFL draft: 1980: undrafted

Career history
- Edmonton Eskimos (1980–1981); Los Angeles Express (1983)

Awards and highlights
- 2× Grey Cup champion (1980, 1981); Second-team All-East (1979)

Brian Broomell (born June 26, 1958) is an American former professional football quarterback who played one season with the Edmonton Eskimos of the Canadian Football League (CFL). He played college football at Temple University. He was also a member of the Los Angeles Express of the United States Football League (USFL).

== Early life ==
Broomell attended Sterling High School in Somerdale, New Jersey.

== College career ==
Broomell played for the Temple Owls from 1976 to 1979. He was a defensive back his freshman year in 1976 before converting to quarterback in 1977. He recorded career totals of 3,902 yards on 35 passing touchdowns. He helped the Owls to a 28–17 victory over the California Golden Bears in the 1979 Garden State Bowl on December 15, 1979. Broomell was inducted into the Temple University Athletics Hall of Fame in 1997.

== Professional career ==
Broomell was a member of the Edmonton Eskimos of the CFL from 1980 to 1981, winning the Grey Cup both years. He signed with the USFL's Los Angeles Express in 1983. He was placed on the team's developmental roster and later released on May 26, 1983.
