= Lee Saltz =

American gridiron football player (born 1963)

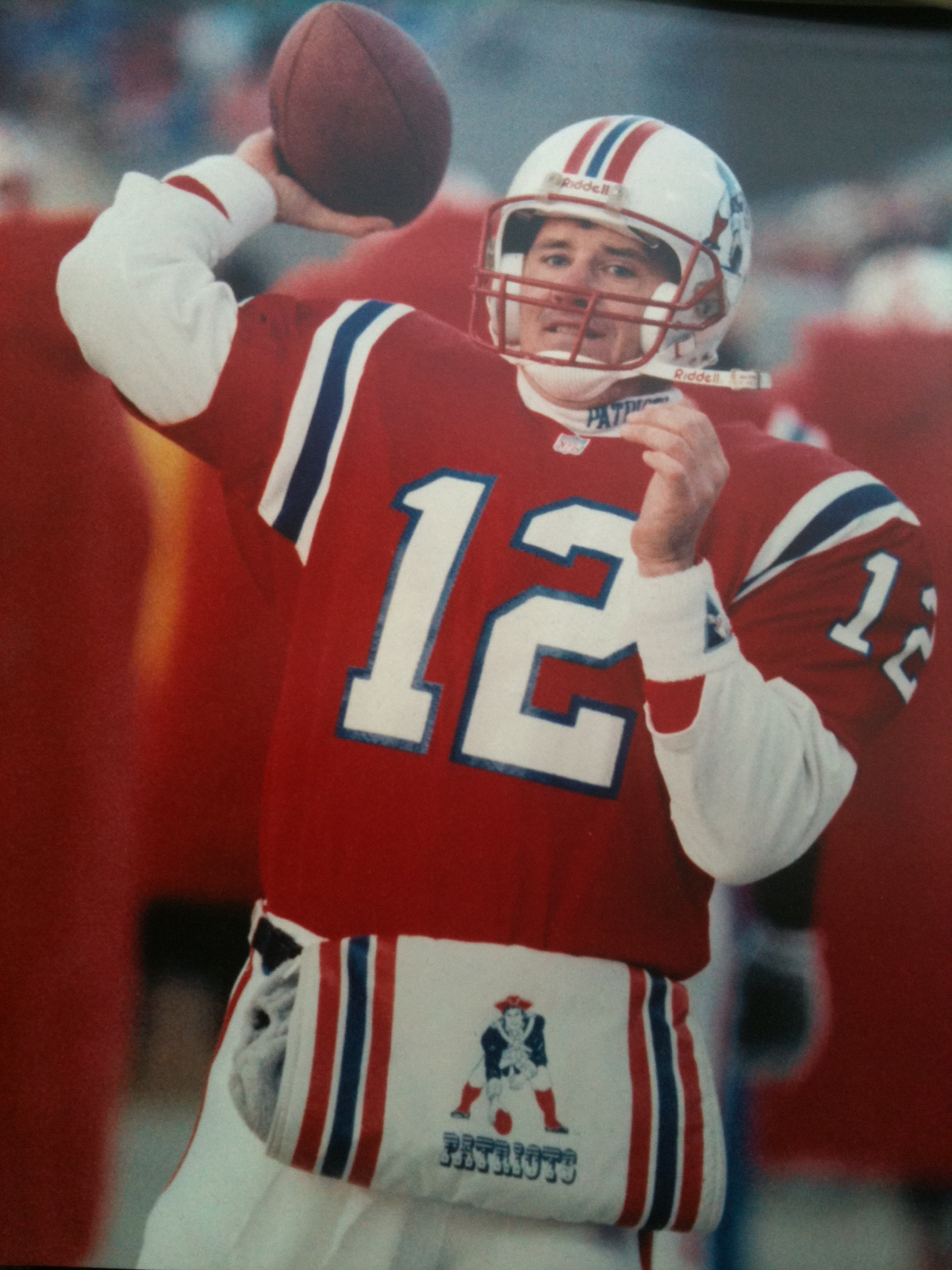
- Saltz with the New England Patriots in 1992

No. 12
- Position: Quarterback

Personal information
- Born: September 25, 1963 (age 63); Randolph, New Jersey, U.S.

Career information
- College: Temple
- NFL draft: 1987: undrafted

Career history
- Detroit Lions (1987); Winnipeg Blue Bombers (1988–1989); San Antonio Riders (1991); Sacramento Surge (1992); New England Patriots (1992); Hamilton Tiger-Cats (1993); St. Louis Stampede (1995)

Awards and highlights
- Grey Cup champion (1988); World Bowl champion (1992); Second-team All-East (1986)
- Stats at ArenaFan.com

Lee Saltz (born September 25, 1963) is an American former professional football quarterback in the National Football League (NFL) who played for the Detroit Lions and New England Patriots. Saltz also played in the Canadian Football League (CFL), World League of American Football (WLAF), and Arena Football League (AFL). He played college football for the Temple Owls.

== Early life ==
Saltz grew up in Randolph, New Jersey, a football town in the northern part of the state. Ted Hart, director of the Randolph Bulldogs midget program, is credited for teaching Saltz the basics of throwing and gripping the ball.

Saltz played at Randolph High School for football coach, John Bauer, Sr. In his senior year, Saltz threw for 1,253 yards and had 7 touchdowns.

== College career ==
Saltz earned a full ride to the Temple Owls football team, where he majored in Business Law and played for the head coach Bruce Arians. In his freshman year (1983), Saltz debuted unexpectedly against Penn State when the injured starter, Tim Riordan, left early in the first half. He finished that game with ten passes for 165 yards and two touchdowns. Saltz never saw the bench again.

Saltz held numerous records at Temple, including a 95-yard touchdown pass which still stands today. Lee finished eight in the 1986 National Quarterback rankings at Temple.

== Professional career ==
After a standout career at Temple, Saltz was signed by the Detroit Lions in 1987 as an undrafted free agent. Released mid-season in 1988 by Detroit, he was picked up by the Canadian Football League's Winnipeg Blue Bombers. He played in the eastern division playoff game beating the Toronto Argonauts and ultimately winning a Grey Cup ring. In 1989, he replaced Sean Salisbury as the Blue Bombers starting quarterback. For a short period of time Lee was head lot attendant at Ed Bozarth Chevrolet. In 1990, he was traded to the Saskatchewan Roughriders. In 1991, Saltz left the Canadian Football league for the World League of American Football, where he played for the San Antonio Riders. He wore the first ever football helmet camera on the playing field. In 1992, Saltz returned to the NFL to play for the New England Patriots. In 1993, Saltz played for the Hamilton Tiger-Cats, and in 1995, he played in the Arena Football League for the St. Louis Stampede.
