= 2001 Temple Owls football team =

American college football season

2001 Temple Owls football
- Conference: Big East Conference
- Record: 4–7 (2–5 Big East)
- Head coach: Bobby Wallace (4th season)
- Offensive coordinator: Tim Stowers (2nd season)
- Defensive coordinator: Raymond Monica (4th season)
- Home stadium: Veterans Stadium; Franklin Field

2001 Big East Conference football standings
| | Conf. | | | Overall |
| Team | W | | L | W | | L |
|---|---|---|---|---|---|---|
| No. 1 Miami (FL) $# | 7 | – | 0 | 12 | – | 0 |
| No. 14 Syracuse | 6 | – | 1 | 10 | – | 3 |
| No. 18 Virginia Tech | 4 | – | 3 | 8 | – | 4 |
| No. 21 Boston College | 4 | – | 3 | 8 | – | 4 |
| Pittsburgh | 4 | – | 3 | 7 | – | 5 |
| Temple | 2 | – | 5 | 4 | – | 7 |
| West Virginia | 1 | – | 6 | 3 | – | 8 |
| Rutgers | 0 | – | 7 | 2 | – | 9 |
# – BCS National Champion; $ – BCS representative as conference champion; Rankings from AP Poll

The 2001 Temple Owls football team represented Temple University as a member of the Big East Conference during the 2001 NCAA Division I-A football season. Led by fourth-year head coach Bobby Wallace, the Owls compiled an overall record of 4–7 with a mark of 2–5 in conference play, placing sixth in the Big East. Temple played home games at Veterans Stadium and Franklin Field in Philadelphia.

== Schedule ==
| Date | Time | Opponent | Site | TV | Result | Attendance | Source |
|---|---|---|---|---|---|---|---|
| August 30 | 7:00 pm | Navy* | Franklin Field; Philadelphia, PA | | W 45–26 | 26,191 | |
| September 8 | 4:00 pm | Toledo* | Franklin Field; Philadelphia, PA | | L 7–33 | 19,751 | |
| September 22 | 6:00 pm | at Bowling Green* | Doyt Perry Stadium; Bowling Green, OH | | L 23–42 | 11,029 | |
| October 6 | 3:30 pm | at Boston College | Alumni Stadium; Chestnut Hill, MA | ESPN Plus | L 10–33 | 38,724 | |
| October 13 | 4:00 pm | Rutgers^{†} | Veterans Stadium; Philadelphia, PA | ESPN Plus | W 30–5 | 19,861 | |
| October 20 | 1:30 pm | at Syracuse | Carrier Dome; Syracuse, NY | | L 3–45 | 42,115 | |
| October 27 | 12:00 pm | Pittsburgh | Veterans Stadium; Philadelphia, PA | | L 7–33 | 12,859 | |
| November 3 | 12:00 pm | at No. 1 Miami (FL) | Miami Orange Bowl; Miami, FL | ESPN Plus | L 0–38 | 31,128 | |
| November 10 | 12:00 pm | No. 23 Virginia Tech | Veterans Stadium; Philadelphia, PA | | L 0–35 | 21,915 | |
| November 17 | 1:00 pm | at West Virginia | Mountaineer Field; Morgantown, WV | | W 17–14 | 37,120 | |
| November 24 | 12:00 pm | Connecticut* | Franklin Field; Philadelphia, PA | | W 56–7 | 10,060 | |
*Non-conference game; ^{†}Homecoming; Rankings from AP Poll released prior to the game; All times are in Eastern time

== Roster ==
2001 Temple Owls football team roster
Players
Coaches
Offense

| Pos. | # | Name | Class |
|---|---|---|---|
| WR | 12 | Ikey Chuku | So |
| WR | 22 | Donnie Coleman | So |
| WR | 27 | Zamir Abdul-Hakim Cobb | Jr |
| WR | 3 | Mac DeVito | Sr |
| WR | 2 | Sean Dillard | Jr |
| QB | 10 | Mike Frost | Sr |
| FB | 25 | Jason McKie | Sr |
| OT | 79 | Dave Yovanovits | Jr |

Defense

| Pos. | # | Name | Class |
|---|---|---|---|
| DE | 89 | Raheem Brock | Sr |
| DT | 73 | Dan Klecko | Jr |
| DT | 72 | David Terry | Jr |
| DT | 90 | Dominique Veney | Jr |
| FS | 9 | Jamal Wallace | Jr |
| LB | 23 | Brian West | Sr |

Special teams

| Pos. | # | Name | Class |

Head coach

- Bobby Wallace

Coordinators/assistant coaches

Legend

- (C) Team captain
- (S) Suspended
- (I) Ineligible
- Injured
- Redshirt

Roster
