= 2012 Temple Owls football team =

American college football season

2012 Temple Owls football
- Conference: Big East Conference
- Record: 4–7 (2–5 Big East)
- Head coach: Steve Addazio (2nd season)
- Offensive coordinator: Ryan Day (1st season)
- Defensive coordinator: Chuck Heater (2nd season)
- Home stadium: Lincoln Financial Field

2012 Big East Conference football standings
	Conf.			Overall
Team	W		L	W		L
No. 13 Louisville $+	5	–	2	11	–	2
Cincinnati +	5	–	2	10	–	3
Rutgers +	5	–	2	9	–	4
Syracuse +	5	–	2	8	–	5
Pittsburgh	3	–	4	6	–	7
Connecticut	2	–	5	5	–	7
Temple	2	–	5	4	–	7
South Florida	1	–	6	3	–	9
$ – BCS representative as conference champion; + – Conference co-champions; Rankings from AP Poll

The 2012 Temple Owls football team represented Temple University in the 2012 NCAA Division I FBS football season. The Owls were led by second-year head coach Steve Addazio and played their home games at Lincoln Financial Field. This season marked the Owls' first season returning as members of the Big East Conference since they were forced out of the conference following the 2004 season. They finished the season 4–7, 2–5 in Big East play to finish in a tie for sixth place with UConn. Future Ohio State head coach Ryan Day was Temple's offensive coordinator in the 2012 season.

== Schedule ==
Date	Time	Opponent	Site	TV	Result	Attendance
August 31	7:00 p.m.	Villanova*	Lincoln Financial Field; Philadelphia, PA (Mayor's Cup)	ESPN3	W 41–10	32,709
September 8	12:00 p.m.	Maryland*	Lincoln Financial Field; Philadelphia, PA	ESPNU	L 27–36	23,322
September 22	3:30 p.m.	at Penn State*	Beaver Stadium; University Park, PA	ABC	L 13–24	93,680
October 6	12:00 p.m.	South Florida^{†}	Lincoln Financial Field; Philadelphia, PA	Big East Network	W 37–28	25,796
October 13	1:00 p.m.	at Connecticut	Rentschler Field; East Hartford, CT	ESPN3	W 17–14 ^{OT}	37,279
October 20	12:00 p.m.	No. 19 Rutgers	Lincoln Financial Field; Philadelphia, PA	Big East Network	L 10–35	35,145
October 27	12:00 p.m.	at Pittsburgh	Heinz Field; Pittsburgh, PA	Big East Network	L 17–47	42,425
November 3	12:00 p.m.	at No. 10 Louisville	Papa John's Cardinal Stadium; Louisville, KY	ABC	L 17–45	44,609
November 10	12:00 p.m.	Cincinnati	Lincoln Financial Field; Philadelphia, PA	Big East Network	L 10–34	20,192
November 17	12:00 p.m.	at Army*	Michie Stadium; West Point, NY	CBSSN	W 63–32	27,019
November 23	11:00 a.m.	Syracuse	Lincoln Financial Field; Philadelphia, PA	ESPN2	L 20–38	22,317
*Non-conference game; ^{†}Homecoming; Rankings from AP Poll released prior to the game; All times are in Eastern time
