= Pitt Stadium =

Defunct outdoor stadium

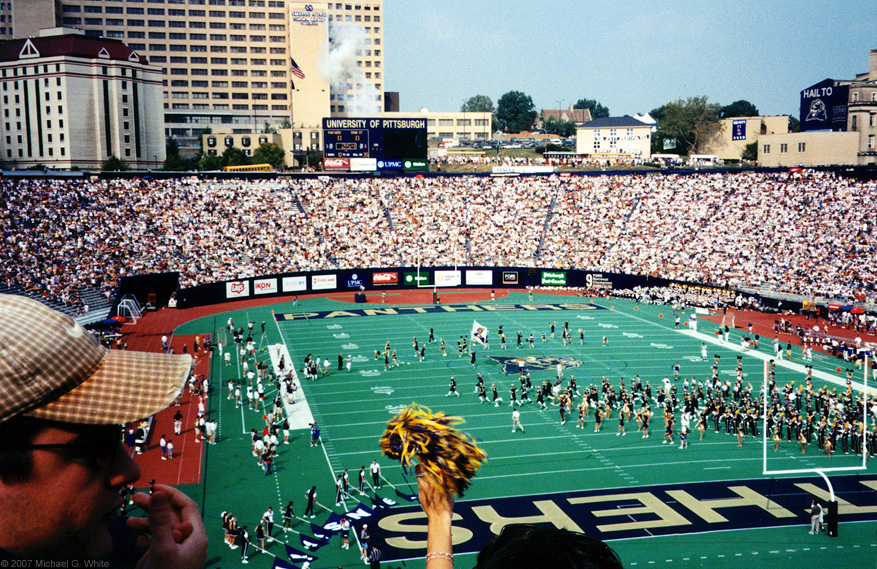
- View from southwest corner in 1998
- Interactive map of Pitt Stadium
- Location: Terrace Street; Pittsburgh, Pennsylvania
- Coordinates: 40.444°N 79.962°W
- Owner: University of Pittsburgh
- Operator: University of Pittsburgh
- Capacity: 56,500 (c. 1949–1999); 69,400 (1925–c. 1949)
- Surface: AstroTurf (1990–1999); SuperTurf (1984–1989); AstroTurf (1970–1983); Natural grass (1925–1969)

Construction
- Groundbreaking: August 7, 1924
- Opened: September 1, 1925
- Closed: November 13, 1999
- Demolished: December 1999
- Cost: $2.1 million ($38.6 million in 2025)
- Architect: W. S. Hindman
- Main contractor: Turner Construction

Tenants
- Pittsburgh Panthers (NCAA) football, soccer, track & field (1925–1999) basketball (1925–1951); Baseball (1939–1969); Carnegie Tech Tartans (NCAA) (1929–1943); Pittsburgh Steelers (NFL) (1964–1969); Pittsburgh Civic Light Opera (1946–1958)

Pitt Stadium was an outdoor athletic stadium in the eastern United States, located on the campus of the University of Pittsburgh in the Oakland neighborhood of Pittsburgh, Pennsylvania. Opened in 1925, it served primarily as the home of the university's Pittsburgh Panthers football team through 1999. It was also used for other sporting events, including basketball, soccer, baseball, track and field, rifle, and gymnastics.

Designed by University of Pittsburgh graduate W. S. Hindman, the $2.1 million stadium was built after the seating capacity of the Panthers' previous home, Forbes Field, was deemed inadequate in light of the growing popularity of college football. Pitt Stadium also served as the second home of the Pittsburgh Steelers, the city's National Football League (NFL) franchise. After demolition, the Pittsburgh Panthers football team played home games at Three Rivers Stadium in 2000, before moving to the new Heinz Field (now Acrisure Stadium) in 2001, where the Panthers have played their home games ever since.

== History ==
The Pittsburgh Panthers played home football games at the Pittsburgh Pirates' Forbes Field from 1909 to 1924. In the 1910s and 1920s, Pitt football achieved great success under head coach Glenn Scobey "Pop" Warner, completing several undefeated seasons and claiming several national championships.

The popularity of college football was rising across the country and in Pittsburgh. Subsequently, due to tickets being reserved for alumni and students, the general public's demand for tickets to see Pitt play at Forbes Field surpassed supply. In the early 1920s, the university administration decided to build an on-campus stadium to alleviate the seating problem. It purchased nine acres of land adjacent to university property for the Pitt Stadium site; university and private funding provided $2.1 million for site acquisition and construction. W. S. Hindman, a Pitt graduate, was the stadium's designer and engineer.

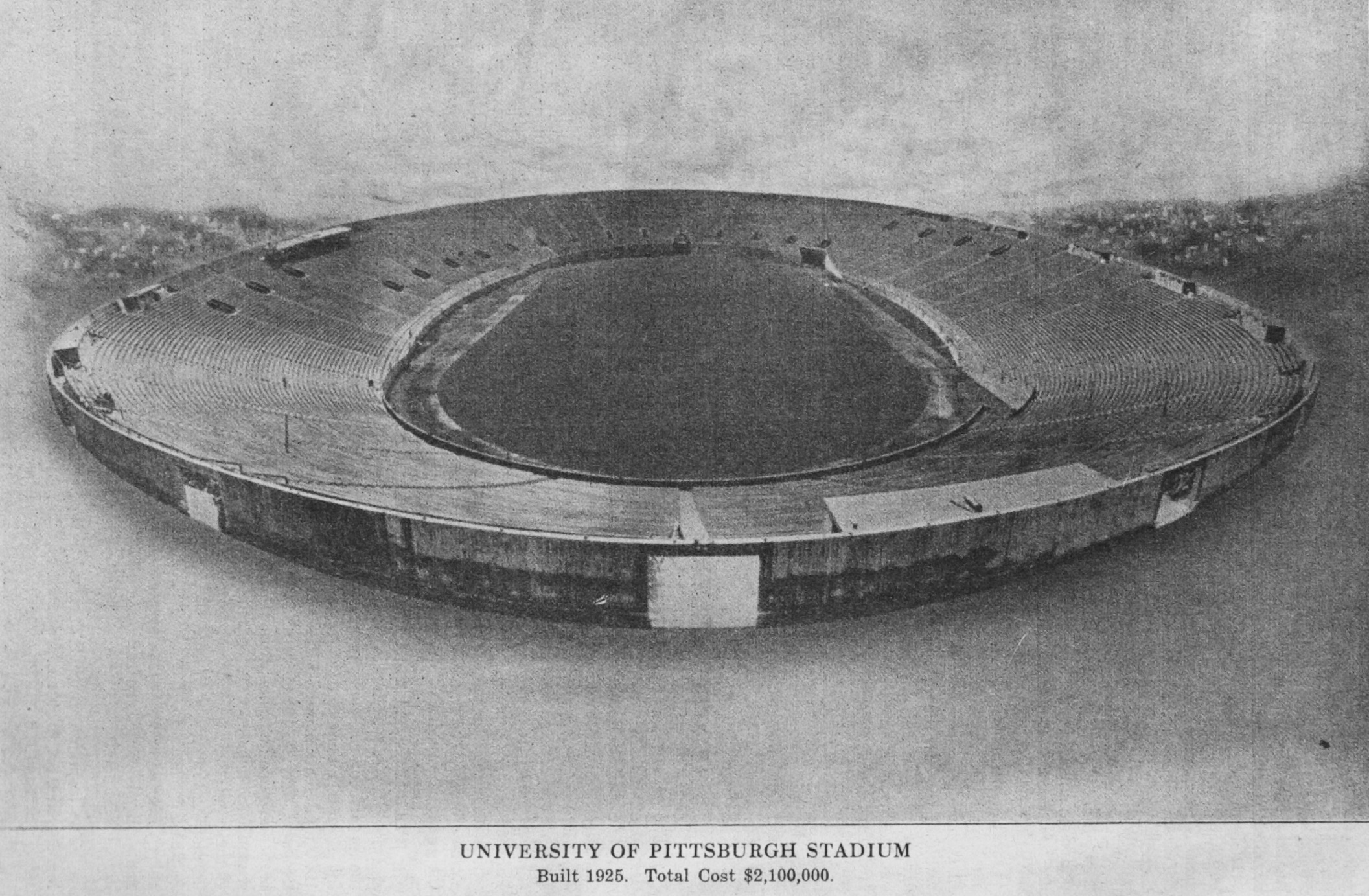
View of the stadium in 1925

The Turner Construction Company built the stadium from August 7, 1924 to September 1, 1925. The 791-by-691-foot (241 by 211 m) venue was designed to hold a capacity of 69,400, with provisions for an upper deck that could hold an additional 30,000 seats. On September 26, 1925, Pitt played its first football game at the new Pitt Stadium, a 26–0 victory over Washington and Lee.

Starting in 1929, the stadium also hosted the football team of the Carnegie Tech Tartans, which played their home games there on a split schedule with the Panthers until 1943.

By the 1940s, new safety rules from the city fire marshal prohibited temporary bleacher seats on the rim of the stadium and in the track area. In order to provide comfort to larger spectators, the Department of Athletics also widened seats from 16 to 18 inches (41 to 46 cm), reducing the final capacity to 56,500. The original grass surface was replaced with AstroTurf in 1970. SuperTurf was installed in 1984, but after six years AstroTurf returned. In the late 1970s, the original 17 miles (27 km) of wood seating was replaced with metal bleachers. Temporary lighting was installed at Pitt Stadium in 1985, but was made permanent before the 1987 season. A scoreboard was installed at the eastern end of the stadium in 1995; this was followed in 1997 with the installation of the PantherVision videoboard, which allowed fans to see instant replays of the games. The highest attended game was in 1938, when 68,918 saw the Panthers defeat Fordham 24–13 on October 29.

The NFL's Steelers played home games at Forbes Field from their 1933 inception to 1957. They first played at Pitt Stadium in 1942, in an exhibition match for U.S.O. charity against the Fort Knox "Armoraiders" on November 15. From 1958 to 1963, the Steelers split home games between Forbes Field and Pitt Stadium. Fans were able to purchase season ticket packages for one site or the other. In 1964, the Steelers began to play home games exclusively at Pitt Stadium, which they continued until moving to the new Three Rivers Stadium in 1970. Of historic note, the iconic photo of New York Giants quarterback Y. A. Tittle, helmet-less, bloodied and kneeling, was taken at Pitt Stadium in 1964 following the Giants' loss to the Steelers on September 20. The photo, taken by Pittsburgh Post-Gazette photographer Morris Berman, now hangs in the Pro Football Hall of Fame.

In the late 1980s, then athletic director Ed Bozik unveiled a massive overhaul plan for Pitt Stadium that entailed gutting the stadium and rebuilding it from the ground up. In addition to luxury boxes, the $55 million renovation would have added a dome to the stadium.

By the mid-1990s, it was apparent that Pitt Stadium needed further renovations to keep up with the times. When the cost of the needed renovations proved prohibitive, athletic director Steve Pederson decided to demolish the stadium and replace it with a long-awaited convocation center and basketball arena on its footprint.

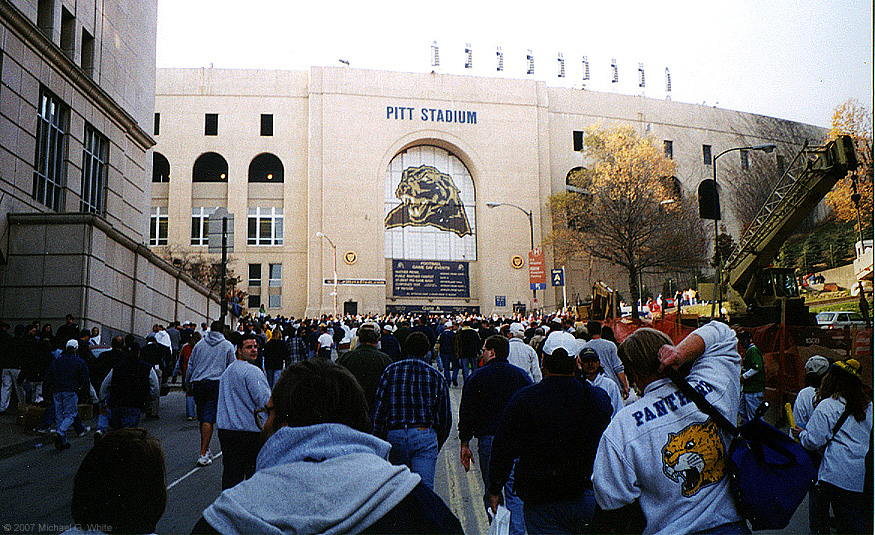
Pitt Stadium at the University of Pittsburgh prior to its last game, 1999

The final game at Pitt Stadium took place on November 13, 1999, when the Panthers defeated Notre Dame, 37–27. The final touchdown in Pitt Stadium was scored by Kevan Barlow at 7:06 pm, just minutes prior to fans rushing onto the field. Some of the 60,190 spectators—the largest crowd in 16 years—ran onto the field with nine seconds remaining in the game, tearing down both goal posts and removing pieces of turf. The Panthers played their home games of the 2000 season at Three Rivers Stadium, before moving to Heinz Field in 2001. Demolition of Pitt Stadium began in December 1999. Concrete from the stadium was ground and left on site for use in the Petersen Events Center and student housing which was built at the site; construction began in June 2000 and the Petersen Events Center opened up in April 2002.

=== The Pitt Pavilion ===
The Pitt Pavilion, located beneath the ramps inside Gate 2 of Pitt Stadium, was the home of the Panthers basketball team from January 6, 1925 (with a loss to Geneva College) to February 26, 1951 with a Backyard Brawl victory. The Pavilion contained both permanent and temporary bleachers for a capacity of approximately 4,000 spectators. However, with only one dressing room, visiting teams were forced to use the visitors' football locker room to dress and then walk 60-yards outdoors to get to the basketball court. Future coach John Wooden and Notre Dame's Moose Krause were basketball stars that played against the Panthers at the Pavilion. While there, the Panthers themselves featured several All-Americans, including Basketball Hall of Fame inductee Charlie Hyatt, and recorded the school's only undefeated season in 1928. On February 26, 1951, the Panthers won the final game at the Pavilion, defeating rival West Virginia 74-72 on a last-second shot by Scott Phillips, his only points in the game. The basketball team moved to the Fitzgerald Field House for the 1951-52 season. The Pavilion also hosted WPIAL playoff games and pre-season games of the American Basketball League's Pittsburgh Rens. The Pitt Pavilion was removed in 1994 when ground was broken for the stadium's Duratz Athletic Complex.

Preceded by Forbes Field	Home of the Pittsburgh Panthers football 1925–1999	Succeeded by Three Rivers Stadium
Preceded by Forbes Field	Home of the Pittsburgh Steelers; 1942, 1958–1969	Succeeded by Three Rivers Stadium
