= 2008 Temple Owls football team =

American college football season

2008 Temple Owls football
- Conference: Mid-American Conference
- East
- Record: 5–7 (4–4 MAC)
- Head coach: Al Golden (3rd season)
- Offensive coordinator: Matt Rhule (1st season)
- Offensive scheme: Pro spread
- Defensive coordinator: Mark D'Onofrio (3rd season)
- Base defense: 4–3
- Home stadium: Lincoln Financial Field

2008 Mid-American Conference football standings
	Conf.			Overall
Team	W		L	W		L
East Division
Buffalo x$	5	–	3	8	–	6
Bowling Green	4	–	4	6	–	6
Temple	4	–	4	5	–	7
Ohio	3	–	5	4	–	8
Akron	3	–	5	5	–	7
Kent State	3	–	5	4	–	8
Miami (OH)	1	–	7	2	–	10
West Division
Ball State x	8	–	0	12	–	2
Central Michigan	6	–	2	8	–	5
Western Michigan	6	–	2	9	–	4
Northern Illinois	5	–	3	6	–	7
Toledo	2	–	6	3	–	9
Eastern Michigan	2	–	6	3	–	9
Championship: Buffalo 42, Ball State 24
$ – Conference champion; x – Division champion/co-champions

The 2008 Temple Owls football team represented Temple University in the 2008 NCAA Division I FBS football season. The Owls competed as a member of the Mid-American Conference (MAC) East Division. The team was coached by Al Golden and played their home games in Lincoln Financial Field.

== Schedule ==
Date	Time	Opponent	Site	TV	Result	Attendance
August 28	7:00 pm	at Army*	Michie Stadium; West Point, NY	ESPN Classic	W 35–7	21,822
September 6	12:00 pm	Connecticut*	Lincoln Financial Field; Philadelphia, PA	ESPNU	L 9–12 ^{OT}	17,194
September 13	12:00 pm	at Buffalo	University at Buffalo Stadium; Amherst, NY	ESPN Plus	L 28–30	18,333
September 20	12:00 pm	at No. 16 Penn State*	Beaver Stadium; State College, PA	BTN	L 3–45	105,106
September 27	2:00 pm	Western Michigan^{†}	Lincoln Financial Field; Philadelphia, PA		L 3–7	17,624
October 4	3:30 pm	at Miami (OH)	Yager Stadium; Oxford, OH	ONN	W 28–10	17,295
October 11	4:00 pm	at Central Michigan	Kelly/Shorts Stadium; Mount Pleasant, MI		L 14–24	22,114
October 21	8:00 pm	Ohio	Lincoln Financial Field; Philadelphia, PA	ESPN2	W 14–10	18,824
November 1	3:30 pm	at Navy*	Navy–Marine Corps Memorial Stadium; Annapolis, MD	CBSCS	L 27–33	34,775
November 12	8:00 pm	at Kent State	Dix Stadium; Kent, OH	ESPN360	L 38–41	6,886
November 22	1:00 pm	Eastern Michigan	Lincoln Financial Field; Philadelphia, PA		W 55–52	13,033
November 28	1:00 pm	Akron	Lincoln Financial Field; Philadelphia, PA		W 27–6	11,234
*Non-conference game; ^{†}Homecoming; Rankings from AP Poll released prior to the game; All times are in Eastern time
