= Paul Zukauskas =

American football player and coach (born 1979)

No. 62, 66
- Position: Guard

Personal information
- Born: July 12, 1979 (age 47); Weymouth, Massachusetts, U.S.
- Listed height: 6 ft 5 in (1.96 m)
- Listed weight: 320 lb (145 kg)

Career information
- High school: Boston College High School (Boston, Massachusetts)
- College: Boston College
- NFL draft: 2001: 7th round, 203rd overall pick

Career history
- Cleveland Browns (2001–2004); San Francisco 49ers (2005)*
- * Offseason or practice squad member only

Awards and highlights
- First-team All-American (2000)

Career NFL statistics
- Games played: 43
- Games started: 18
- Stats at Pro Football Reference

Paul Malcolm Zukauskas (born July 12, 1979) is an American former professional football player. He played college football at Boston College. He was selected by the Cleveland Browns in the seventh round of the 2001 NFL draft and played for the Browns from 2001 to 2004.

== Early life ==
Born Paul Malcolm Zukauskas, the son of Anne Marie and Thomas Zukauskas on July 12, 1979, he earned all-state and all-conference honors as a senior tackle at Boston College High School. He earned All-America honors from Prep Star and USA Today. He made 40 tackles as a senior and served as team captain. He played in the 1997 Massachusetts Shriners Football Classic.

== College career ==
He was a four-year starter who became the first freshman in over 20 years to start on the Boston College offensive line in 1997. As a junior, he was named All-Big East Conference second-team selection in 1999. As a senior, he was named All-Big East Conference first-team selection and first-team All-America selection by the American Football Coaches Association, Rivals.com and second-team All-American selection by the Walter Camp Football Foundation and The Sporting News in 2000.

In 2016, Zukauskas was inducted into the Boston College Hall of Fame.

== Professional career ==
=== 2001 ===
As a rookie with Browns, he was on the practice squad for the first 9 weeks. He was then signed to the active roster on November 21, and appeared in one game. Made his NFL debut by playing on special teams against the Tennessee Titans on December 30.

=== 2002 ===
In his second year he participated in all 16 regular season games as the Browns backup right offensive guard and also played on special teams. Made three starting assignments at right guard early in the season as starting center Dave Wohlabaugh broke his hand and the starting right guard, Shaun O'Hara moved to center. He made his first career start vs. the Cincinnati Bengals on Sept. 15. He appeared on special teams and also lined up as tackle eligible in goal line running situations in the AFC wild card game vs. the Pittsburgh Steelers on January 5.

=== 2003 ===
He was in 12 games, 10 of the games were starts at right guard. In the beginning of the season he was the backup right guard to starter Shaun O'Hara. He moved into the starting lineup beginning Week 4 vs. the Cincinnati Bengals on September 28, as Zukauskas started at RG and O'Hara moved over to left guard. Then he started eight consecutive weeks at right guard before missing two weeks due to the death of his mother, Anne Marie. Moved back into the starting lineup at right guard vs. the Denver Broncos on December 14, and vs. the Baltimore Ravens on December 21. Inactive the final week of the season due to a knee injury.

=== 2004 ===
He appeared in 14 games and 5 of the games were starts at left guard. He started the season as the starting left guard. He was injured in Week 2 vs. the Dallas Cowboys and took on a backup role after week 5 Pittsburgh Steelers. He played considerable time later in the season vs. New York Jets and vs. the Houston Texans.

=== 2005 ===
He signed with the San Francisco 49ers and injured his back during the second week of training camp. He then was released at the end of camp. He did not play the rest of season due to injury.

=== 2006 ===
He retired in March 2006.

== Coaching career ==
=== 2009–2011 ===
As a graduate assistant at Boston College, he was part of the football coaching staff that guided the team to two postseason bowl appearances. Zukauskas worked on the defensive side of the ball with the linebackers unit and helped coach Luke Kuechly and Mark Herzlich. The BC defense ranked no. 1 in the Atlantic Coast Conference (ACC) in total defense and no. 1 nationally in run defense in 2010.

=== 2011–2017 ===
Zukauskas served as the head coach of the Lawrence Academy's Spartans football team. He is a member of the American Football Coaches Association along with serving as an NFL ambassador to the "Heads Up" football initiative, and is an advisor to the Football Players Health Study at Harvard University for former NFL players. In 2014, the Lawrence Academy football team won the ISL and NEPSAC championships and also won the ISL Sportsmanship Award, awarded to the team that, in the eyes of its opponents, best exemplifies the ideals of Integrity, Sportsmanship, and Fair Play. Under the leadership of Zukauskas, the Spartans won the ISL championships in 2015, 2016, 2017 as well; and rounded off the 2017 season with a NEPSAC championship.

=== 2024–present ===
Zukauskas was named football head coach at his alma mater, Boston College high school in 2024, leading the Eagles to an 8–3 record and state Division I football tournament, state semifinals.

== Charity work ==
During his time in the NFL he donated his time to various non-profit organizations, including building a home for Habitat For Humanity, building a playground for the United Way's Hometown Huddle program, visiting children at the Cleveland Clinic Children's Hospital, Rainbow Babies and Children's Hospital and distributing turkeys to Cleveland residents during the holidays.

After the death of his mother in 2003, Zukauskas, his father Tom and brother Tom Jr. started a charity, The Anne Marie Zukauskas Fund, which helps provide support to students in need within the Quincy, Massachusetts, public school system. The fund also assists Broad Meadows Middle School, the former school that his mother was the principal of, with special projects.

Zukauskas also serves on the board of directors for Project DEEP. Project DEEP is a nonprofit educational program, which operates through collaborations with Boston for Youth & Families and Mayor Thomas M. Menino, and charitable institutions like The Boston Foundation. The mission of the program is to foster the educational, athletic and social growth and development of middle school children of all races, creeds and ethnic backgrounds throughout the Dorchester community.
