= Antwan Lake =

American football player (born 1979)

No. 68, 96
- Position: Defensive tackle

Personal information
- Born: July 10, 1979 (age 47); Seaford, Delaware, U.S.
- Listed height: 6 ft 4 in (1.93 m)
- Listed weight: 308 lb (140 kg)

Career information
- High school: Cambridge-South Dorchester (MD)
- College: West Virginia
- NFL draft: 2002: undrafted

Career history
- Detroit Lions (2002–2003); Atlanta Falcons (2004–2005); New Orleans Saints (2006–2008); Las Vegas Locomotives (2010–2011)

Awards and highlights
- UFL champion (2010)

Career NFL statistics
- Total tackles: 70
- Sacks: 5.5
- Forced fumbles: 2
- Fumble recoveries: 1
- Stats at Pro Football Reference

Antwan Tabari Lake (born July 10, 1979) is an American former professional football player who was a defensive tackle in the National Football League (NFL). He played college football for the West Virginia Mountaineers and was signed by the Detroit Lions of the NFL as an undrafted free agent in 2002.

Lake also played for the Atlanta Falcons and New Orleans Saints of the NFL, and the Las Vegas Locomotives of the United Football League.

== College career ==
Antwan Lake enrolled at West Virginia University in 1998. He played outside linebacker his freshman season, recording 9 tackles, a forced fumble, a fumble recovery, and 3 sacks.

As a sophomore, in 1999, Lake shifted to defensive tackle. That season, he totaled 39 tackles and three sacks. As a junior, 2000, hr only recorded 13 tackles and one sack. In his final season, 2001, hr recorded 26 tackles and 3 sacks. In his career, the three-year starter totaled 87 tackles, 10 sacks, and 15 tackles-for-a-loss.

== Professional career ==
=== Detroit Lions ===
After being undrafted in the 2002 NFL draft, Antwan Lake joined the Detroit Lions. He played in nine games as a rookie, recording two tackles.

=== Atlanta Falcons ===
After his rookie season with Detroit, Lake was signed by the Atlanta Falcons on December 21, 2003. He did not see playing time for the rest of the 2003 season.

In 2004, Lake played in every game on the season. He recorded 17 tackles and deflected a pass on the season.

In 2005, Antwan Lake recorded 21 tackles, 3.5 sacks, two forced fumbles, and a safety while playing in 13 games on the season.

=== New Orleans Saints ===
After being cut from Atlanta in 2005, Lake was picked up by the New Orleans Saints in 2006. He played in 15 games that season, totaling 15 tackles, one sack, and a pass deflection.

In 2007, Lake totaled 18 tackles, one sack, and four safeties.
