= Barrett Green =

American football player (born 1977)

No. 52, 54
- Position: Linebacker

Personal information
- Born: October 29, 1977 (age 49); West Palm Beach, Florida, U.S.
- Listed height: 6 ft 0 in (1.83 m)
- Listed weight: 226 lb (103 kg)

Career information
- High school: Riviera Beach (FL) Suncoast
- College: West Virginia
- NFL draft: 2000: 2nd round, 50th overall pick

Career history
- Detroit Lions (2000–2003); New York Giants (2004–2005); Houston Texans (2006)*
- * Offseason or practice squad member only

Awards and highlights
- 2× First-team All-Big East (1998)

Career NFL statistics
- Tackles: 289
- Sacks: 5
- Pass deflections: 13
- Stats at Pro Football Reference

Barrett Nicholas Green (born October 29, 1977) is an American former professional football player who was a linebacker in the National Football League (NFL). He played college football for the West Virginia Mountaineers and was selected in the second round (50th overall) by the Detroit Lions in the 2000 NFL draft.

== Early life ==
Green was born in West Palm Beach, Florida and attended Suncoast High School. At Suncoast, he was a wrestler and played baseball along with football. Following his senior season he played in the South Florida All-Star Game.

== College career ==
As a true freshman in 1995, Green redshirted but was still named Rookie of the Year due to his performance on the scout team. In 1996, Green was the back up strong safety and played in every game. For the season he recorded 12 tackles and a pass deflection. Green was elevated to the starting strong safety as a redshirt sophomore in 1997 and played in every game. He finished third on West Virginia with 71 tackles and also had three sacks. Green added a fumble recovery, six pass deflections and four interceptions to his season totals. Against Notre Dame he had nine tackles which was his season high and he also had eight tackles against Maryland. Green recorded the longest non-touchdown interception return in Mountaineer Field history with an 83-yard return against Rutgers. In 1998, Green moved forward to the starting weak-side linebacker and added 84 more tackles than the previous season with a team–leading 155 tackles and set a school record with 107 solo tackles. His 155 tackles was the seventh best in West Virginia school history. His season high in tackles was 19 against Navy and Miami (Fla.). He added 15 tackles against Syracuse and 14 in the Boston College game. In the 1998 Insight.com Bowl against Missouri, he played with a cracked rib and yet he still recorded a team high 14 tackles. Following the season he was named First team All Big East. Green was named First team All Big East for a second straight year in 1999 a season in which he led the team once again with 126 tackles. Three sacks and seven tackles for a loss added to his season totals. He recorded 18 tackles against Navy, 17 against Virginia Tech and 15 against Syracuse.

== NFL career statistics ==
Legend
**Bold**	Career high

Year	Team	Games		Tackles					Interceptions					Fumbles			
Year	Team	GP	GS	Cmb	Solo	Ast	Sck	TFL	Int	Yds	TD	Lng	PD	FF	FR	Yds	TD
2000	DET	9	0	4	4	0	0.0	0	0	0	0	0	0	0	1	0	0
2001	DET	14	10	79	55	24	1.0	5	0	0	0	0	3	1	0	0	0
2002	DET	15	14	73	50	23	1.0	**6**	0	0	0	0	**5**	0	0	0	0
2003	DET	**16**	**16**	**94**	**65**	**29**	**3.0**	4	0	0	0	0	2	0	**2**	**38**	0
2004	NYG	10	9	39	26	13	0.0	0	0	0	0	0	3	**2**	**2**	16	**1**
2005	NYG	1	0	0	0	0	0.0	0	0	0	0	0	0	0	0	0	0
		65	49	289	200	89	5.0	15	0	0	0	0	13	3	5	54	1

== Personal life ==
Green's father is former Bowling Green and New York Giants player, Joe Green.
