= Bryan Knight =

American football player (born 1979)

No. 90
- Position: Linebacker

Personal information
- Born: January 22, 1979 (age 47); Buffalo, New York, U.S.

Career information
- High school: Tonawanda (NY) St. Joseph's
- College: Pittsburgh
- NFL draft: 2002: 5th round, 165th overall pick

Career history
- Chicago Bears (2002–2004); Carolina Panthers (2005)*
- * Offseason or practice squad member only

Career NFL statistics
- Tackles: 50
- Sacks: 1.5
- Forced fumbles: 1
- Stats at Pro Football Reference

Bryan Knight (born January 22, 1979) is an American former professional football player who was a linebacker in the National Football League (NFL). He played college football for the Pittsburgh Panthers and was selected by the Chicago Bears in the fifth round of the 2002 NFL draft with the 165th overall pick. Knight was also a member of the Carolina Panthers.
