= Hank Poteat =

American football player and coach (born 1977)

Michigan State Spartans
- Title: Cornerbacks coach

Personal information
- Born: August 30, 1977 (age 49); Philadelphia, Pennsylvania, U.S.
- Listed height: 5 ft 11 in (1.80 m)
- Listed weight: 195 lb (88 kg)

Career information
- High school: Harrisburg (Harrisburg, Pennsylvania)
- College: Pittsburgh
- NFL draft: 2000: 3rd round, 77th overall pick

Career history

Playing
- Pittsburgh Steelers (2000–2002); Tampa Bay Buccaneers (2003); Carolina Panthers (2004)*; New England Patriots (2004–2005); New York Jets (2006)*; New England Patriots (2006); New York Jets (2006–2008); Cleveland Browns (2009)
- * Offseason or practice squad member only

Coaching
- Kentucky Christian (2011–2012) Defensive backs coach; Pittsburgh (2013–2014) Graduate assistant; Kent State (2015–2016) Cornerbacks coach; Toledo (2017–2020) Cornerbacks coach; Wisconsin (2021–2022) Cornerbacks coach; Iowa State (2023–2025) Cornerbacks coach; Michigan State (2026–present) Cornerbacks coach

Awards and highlights
- Super Bowl champion (XXXIX); PFWA All-Rookie Team (2000); 2× All-American (1998-1999); 2× All-Big East (1998–1999)

Career NFL statistics
- Total tackles: 210
- Sacks: 3.0
- Forced fumbles: 3
- Interceptions: 4
- Return yards: 1,606
- Return touchdowns: 1
- Stats at Pro Football Reference

Henry Major Poteat, Jr (born August 30, 1977) is an American former professional football player who was a cornerback in the National Football League (NFL), and current cornerbacks coach for the Michigan State Spartans football team. He was selected by the Pittsburgh Steelers in the third round of the 2000 NFL draft. He played college football for the Pittsburgh Panthers.

Poteat played 10 seasons in the NFL for the Steelers, Tampa Bay Buccaneers, New England Patriots and New York Jets. He earned a Super Bowl ring with the Patriots over his hometown Philadelphia Eagles in Super Bowl XXXIX.

== Early life ==
Poteat attended Harrisburg High School in Harrisburg, Pennsylvania and was a letterman in football, basketball, and track. In football, he was a two-time All-Conference selection as a running back and as a defensive back. He finished his college career with 136 tackles, 10 interceptions, a school-record 1,917 kick return yards, 90 rushing yards and 54 receiving yards. He earned 2nd team All-American and 1st team All-Big East as a junior finishing 1st in the Conference and 4th nationally with six interceptions. Poteat, also received All-Big East honors as a senior and 3rd team All-American after posting 16.2 yards a punt return, finishing 1st in the conference and 7th nationally. He also finished with 55 tackles, three interceptions, nine passes defended and one forced fumble over 11 starts. Poteat was the last Pittsburgh defensive back before Jets 2007 first-round pick Darrelle Revis to earn All-Big East honors in back-to-back seasons. He established a single-season record as a junior with 764 kick return yards on 36 returns. In high school, he twice earned all-conference honors as a defensive back/running back and finished his career as the all-time kick returner at Harrisburg, Pennsylvania High School.

== Professional career ==
=== Pittsburgh Steelers ===
Poteat selected in the third round (77th overall) in the 2000 NFL draft by the Pittsburgh Steelers. As a rookie, Poteat was one of the top returners in the NFL setting a Steeler record with the longest punt return for a touchdown by a Steeler in Three Rivers Stadium (54 yards). Poteat tied for fourth in the AFC and sixth in the NFL with a 13.0 yard punt return average on 36 returns for 467 yards and 1 touchdown. At the end of the season Poteat was named to the all-rookie team as a punt returner.

=== Tampa Bay Buccaneers ===
He signed with the Tampa Bay Buccaneers later that season and appeared in one game before being waived on November 12, 2004.

=== New England Patriots ===
Poteat signed with the New England Patriots prior to the 2004–05 playoffs and played in all three of the Patriots' playoff games en route to their victory in Super Bowl XXXIX. Poteat was released by the Patriots on August 29, 2006. Poteat was re-signed on September 27, 2006, after the Patriots placed Randall Gay on injured reserve. Poteat was released again by the Patriots on October 9, 2006, in order to clear a roster spot for Jabar Gaffney.

=== New York Jets ===
A day after his release from the Patriots, Poteat signed with the New York Jets. On February 21, 2007, the Jets re-signed Poteat to a one-year, $635,000 deal including $40,000 bonus money.

Poteat was re-signed in the 2008 offseason on May 6, but released on August 30 during final cuts. He was re-signed three weeks into the regular season on September 25 after offensive lineman Will Montgomery was waived.

=== Cleveland Browns ===
Poteat was signed by the Cleveland Browns on March 9, 2009. The move reunited him with Browns head coach Eric Mangini, for whom he had played in New England and New York.

== NFL career statistics ==
| Year | Team | Games | Combined tackles | Tackles | Assisted tackles | Sacks | Forced fumbles | Fumble recoveries | Fumble return yards | Interceptions | Interception return yards | Yards per interception return | Longest interception return | Interceptions returned for touchdown | Passes defended |
|---|---|---|---|---|---|---|---|---|---|---|---|---|---|---|---|
| 2000 | PIT | 15 | 2 | 0 | 2 | 0.0 | 0 | 0 | 0 | 0 | 0 | 0 | 0 | 0 | 0 |
| 2001 | PIT | 13 | 7 | 7 | 0 | 0.0 | 0 | 0 | 0 | 0 | 0 | 0 | 0 | 0 | 0 |
| 2002 | PIT | 13 | 19 | 16 | 3 | 0.0 | 0 | 1 | 0 | 0 | 0 | 0 | 0 | 0 | 1 |
| 2003 | TB | 1 | 3 | 3 | 0 | 0.0 | 0 | 0 | 0 | 0 | 0 | 0 | 0 | 0 | 0 |
| 2005 | NE | 10 | 21 | 17 | 4 | 1.0 | 1 | 0 | 0 | 0 | 0 | 0 | 0 | 0 | 0 |
| 2006 | NE | 2 | 3 | 2 | 1 | 0.0 | 0 | 0 | 0 | 0 | 0 | 0 | 0 | 0 | 1 |
| 2006 | NYJ | 11 | 32 | 23 | 9 | 0.0 | 0 | 1 | 0 | 0 | 0 | 0 | 0 | 0 | 3 |
| 2007 | NYJ | 16 | 37 | 29 | 8 | 0.0 | 0 | 0 | 0 | 2 | 11 | 6 | 11 | 0 | 5 |
| 2008 | NYJ | 13 | 41 | 29 | 12 | 1.0 | 2 | 1 | 0 | 2 | 47 | 24 | 41 | 0 | 4 |
| 2009 | CLE | 16 | 34 | 26 | 8 | 1.0 | 0 | 0 | 0 | 0 | 0 | 0 | 0 | 0 | 4 |
| Career | | 110 | 199 | 152 | 47 | 3.0 | 3 | 3 | 0 | 4 | 58 | 15 | 41 | 0 | 18 |

== Post-playing career ==
Poteat served as an assistant coach for Kentucky Christian University in 2011 and 2012. In 2013, he returned to Pittsburgh as a graduate assistant with the Pitt Panthers. As of February 2015 and 2016 Was the cornerbacks coach for Kent State University.

=== Toledo ===
In 2017, Poteat became the CB coach of the Toledo Rockets and helped lead them to become MAC Champions.

=== Wisconsin ===
On February 11, Poteat became the cornerbacks coach at Wisconsin taking over the duties for Jim Leonhard and reuniting with Paul Chryst who he was under at Pittsburgh.

=== Iowa State ===
On January 12, Poteat became the cornerbacks coach at Iowa State

=== Michigan State ===
In late Dec 2025, Michigan State hired Poteat as cornerbacks coach.

== Personal ==
Poteat is married to Jasmine Poteat and the two have 3 children together. Their names are Ariana, Sierra and Henry “Tre” Poteat III. Tre is a defensive back for the Tennessee Volunteers.
