= Chris Hovan =

American football player and coach (born 1978)

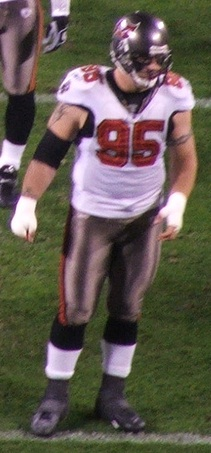
- Hovan with the Tampa Bay Buccaneers in 2006

No. 99, 95
- Position: Defensive tackle

Personal information
- Born: May 12, 1978 (age 48); Rocky River, Ohio, U.S.
- Listed height: 6 ft 2 in (1.88 m)
- Listed weight: 296 lb (134 kg)

Career information
- High school: St. Ignatius (Cleveland, Ohio)
- College: Boston College
- NFL draft: 2000: 1st round, 25th overall pick

Career history

Playing
- Minnesota Vikings (2000–2004); Tampa Bay Buccaneers (2005–2009); St. Louis Rams (2010)

Coaching
- South Florida (S&C) (2011–2012); Tampa Bay Storm (DL) (2013–2015)

Awards and highlights
- Second-team All-Pro (2002); PFWA All-Rookie Team (2000); First-team All-American (1999); 3× All-Big East (1997, 1998, 1999)

Career NFL statistics
- Total tackles: 408
- Sacks: 22.0
- Forced fumbles: 2
- Fumble recoveries: 8
- Stats at Pro Football Reference

Christopher James Hovan (born May 12, 1978) is an American former professional football player who was a defensive tackle in the National Football League (NFL). He played college football for the Boston College Eagles. He was selected by the Minnesota Vikings in the first round of the 2000 NFL draft and played for that team from 2000 to 2004.

Hovan then played for the Tampa Bay Buccaneers from 2005 to 2009. He was also a member of the St. Louis Rams in 2010 but spent the entire season on injured reserve.

== Early life ==
Hovan grew up in Rocky River, Ohio, a suburb of Cleveland. He is the youngest of three children.

He played high school football at St. Ignatius High School in Cleveland. During his career, he earned many honors and awards, including an honorable mention All-American by USA Today and All-City and All-State by The Plain Dealer. He finished his high school career with a school record 28 career sacks. He also played lacrosse, earning All-State recognition.

== College career ==
Hovan played college football at Boston College. As a senior, he was an All-American and a semi-finalist for the Lombardi Award. He also became the first player in Boston College history to be named All-Big East three times. He finished his career starting 43 of 45 games, recording 20.5 sacks.

== Professional career ==
=== Minnesota Vikings ===
Hovan was selected by the Minnesota Vikings in the first round, with the 25th-overall pick, of the 2000 NFL draft. He played 77 games in five years for the Vikings, recording 192 tackles and 17 sacks.

=== Tampa Bay Buccaneers ===
On April 1, 2005, Hovan signed with the Tampa Bay Buccaneers. The Buccaneers won the NFC South and finished as the number-one-ranked defense in his first season with the team. Hovan was released on April 26, 2010.

=== St. Louis Rams ===
On June 9, 2010, Hovan signed with the St. Louis Rams. On August 6, Hovan was placed on injured reserve due to a back injury, ending his 2010 season.

== NFL career statistics ==
Legend
**Bold**	Career high

Year	Team	GP	Tackles				Fumbles		Interceptions					
Year	Team	GP	Comb	Solo	Ast	Sack	FF	FR	Int	Yds	Avg	Lng	TD	PD
2000	MIN	16	46	**41**	5	2.0	0	0	0	0	0.0	0	0	1
2001	MIN	16	43	29	14	**6.0**	**2**	1	0	0	0.0	0	0	1
2002	MIN	16	**52**	38	14	5.5	0	**2**	0	0	0.0	0	0	**4**
2003	MIN	16	27	19	8	2.0	0	0	0	0	0.0	0	0	**4**
2004	MIN	13	20	11	9	1.5	0	1	0	0	0.0	0	0	1
2005	TB	16	45	35	10	0.0	0	**2**	0	0	0.0	0	0	1
2006	TB	16	51	40	11	2.0	0	1	0	0	0.0	0	0	1
2007	TB	16	48	31	**17**	1.5	0	1	0	0	0.0	0	0	1
2008	TB	15	43	36	7	1.0	0	0	0	0	0.0	0	0	1
2009	TB	16	33	26	7	0.5	0	0	0	0	0.0	0	0	0
Career		156	408	306	102	22.0	2	8	0	0	0.0	0	0	15

== Coaching career ==
Hovan was named assistant strength & conditioning coach for the South Florida Bulls in 2011.

Hovan was signed by the Montreal Alouettes of the Canadian Football League as their defensive line coach on January 9, 2013. He was the defensive line coach for the Tampa Bay Storm of the AFL for the 2013 season.

Hovan coached in the AFL with the Tampa Bay Storm for three seasons.

From 2017 to 2018, Hovan was the co-defensive coordinator for the Warriors football team at Steinbrenner High School in Lutz, Florida.

== Personal life ==
Hovan has contributed to the Hemophilia Foundation of Greater Florida and the Pediatric Cancer Foundation.

In April 2015, Hovan was charged with leaving the scene of a crash without providing information. A month later he was charged with a DUI with property damage or injury. In December 2018, Hovan was court ordered to stay away from his wife and children due to domestic violence allegations. On November 30, 2020, Hovan was arrested and booked for another DUI, this time with his child in the passenger seat. He reportedly had a BAC of .31 which is over three times higher than Florida's .08 limit.
