= Ramon Walker =

American football player (born 1979)

No. 41, 22
- Position: Safety

Personal information
- Born: November 8, 1979 (age 46); Akron, Ohio, U.S.
- Listed height: 5 ft 11 in (1.80 m)
- Listed weight: 197 lb (89 kg)

Career information
- High school: Buchtel (Akron)
- College: Pittsburgh
- NFL draft: 2002: 5th round, 153rd overall pick

Career history
- Houston Texans (2002–2005)

Awards and highlights
- 2× First-team All-Big East (1999, 2001); Second-team All-Big East (2000)

Career NFL statistics
- Total tackles: 41
- Fumble recoveries: 1
- Stats at Pro Football Reference

Ramon D. Walker (born November 8, 1979) is an American former professional football player who was a defensive back for the Houston Texans of the National Football League (NFL). He was selected by the Texans in the fifth round of the 2002 NFL draft. He played college football for the Pittsburgh Panthers.

== Early life ==
Walker was born in Akron, Ohio and played high school football at John R. Buchtel High School in Akron. He recorded 29 tackles, 17 sacks and three blocked punts while also rushing 126 times for 1,203 yards his senior year, earning all-state and Ohio Defensive Player of the Year honors.

== College career ==
Walker played college football for the Pittsburgh Panthers from 1998 to 2001. He was redshirted in 1998. He started all 11 games at free safety as a freshman in 1999, totaling 131 tackles, one sack, one interception, seven pass breakups, three forced fumbles and one fumble recovery, garnering The Sporting News and Football News first-team Freshman All-American and first-team All-Big East recognition. Walker was the first freshman defensive back to be named first-team All-Big East. He played in seven games, starting six, in 2000, accumulating 56 tackles, two pass breakups and two forced fumbles, earning second-team All-Big East honors. He started all 11 games his junior year in 2001, totaling 120 tackles and garnering first-team All-Big East accolades.

Walker opted to forgo his senior season and enter the 2002 NFL draft. He finished his college career with totals of 307 career tackles, two interceptions and 14 pass breakups.

== Professional career ==
Walker was selected by the Houston Texans in the fifth round, with the 153rd overall pick, of the 2002 NFL draft. He officially signed with the team on July 18, 2002. He played in nine games, starting one, for the Texans in 2002, recording 11 solo tackles. Walker was placed on injured reserve on December 24, 2002. He appeared in 11 games (no starts) during the 2003 season, totaling 13 solo tackles and one assisted tackle. He was placed on injured reserve for the second straight year on December 1, 2003. The next year, Walker was placed on the physically unable to perform list on September 5, 2004, and did not appear in any games during the 2004 season. He played in all 16 games (no starts) for the Texans in 2005, recording 13 solo tackles, three assisted tackles and one fumble recovery. He became a free agent after the 2005 season and re-signed with the Texans on March 22, 2006. Walker was released on August 28, 2006.
