= Marquand Manuel =

American football player and coach (born 1979)

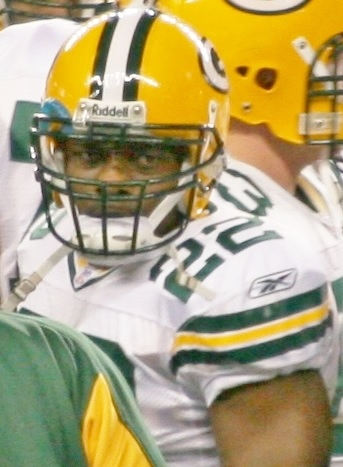
- Manuel with Green Bay Packers in 2006

Tennessee Titans
- Title: Safeties coach

Personal information
- Born: July 11, 1979 (age 47); Miami, Florida, U.S.
- Listed height: 6 ft 0 in (1.83 m)
- Listed weight: 213 lb (97 kg)

Career information
- Position: Safety (No. 44, 33, 22, 36, 40)
- High school: Miami
- College: Florida (1997–2001)
- NFL draft: 2002: 6th round, 181st overall pick

Career history

Playing
- Cincinnati Bengals (2002–2003); Seattle Seahawks (2004–2005); Green Bay Packers (2006); Carolina Panthers (2007); Denver Broncos (2008); Detroit Lions (2009)

Coaching
- Florida (2011) Intern; Seattle Seahawks (2012) Assistant special teams coordinator; Seattle Seahawks (2013) Defensive assistant; Seattle Seahawks (2014) Assistant secondary coach; Atlanta Falcons (2015–2016) Secondary coach; Atlanta Falcons (2017–2018) Defensive coordinator; Philadelphia Eagles (2020) Defensive backs coach; New York Jets (2021–2024) Safeties coach; New York Giants (2025) Defensive backs coach & pass game coordinator; Tennessee Titans (2026–present) Safeties coach

Awards and highlights
- Super Bowl champion (XLVIII)

Career NFL statistics
- Total tackles: 368
- Sacks: 1
- Forced fumbles: 4
- Fumble recoveries: 1
- Interceptions: 2
- Defensive touchdowns: 1
- Stats at Pro Football Reference
- Coaching profile at Pro Football Reference

Marquand Alexander Manuel (born July 11, 1979) is an American football coach and former safety who is currently the safeties coach for the Tennessee Titans. He played college football for the University of Florida and was selected by the Cincinnati Bengals in the sixth round of the 2002 NFL draft. Manuel also played for the Seattle Seahawks, Green Bay Packers, Carolina Panthers, Denver Broncos, and Detroit Lions. He was the defensive coordinator for the Atlanta Falcons from 2017 to 2018.

== Early life ==
Manuel was born in Miami, Florida in 1979. He attended Miami Senior High School, and played football for the Miami High Stingarees. As a senior in 1996, Manuel was a Florida Class 6A all-state selection who made 96 tackles, nine interceptions, and eight blocked passes. He received high school All-America recognition from National Recruiting Advisor, PrepStar, and SuperPrep, and was rated among the top defensive back prospects in the country. Manuel was also a four-year honor roll student and ran the 100-meter dash in 10.6 seconds for the Miami Stingarees track team.

== College career ==
Manuel accepted an athletic scholarship to attend the University of Florida in Gainesville, Florida, where he played for coach Steve Spurrier's Florida Gators football team from 1998 to 2001. The Gators coaching staff decided to redshirt Manuel as a true freshman in 1997, but he played in all 11 regular season games in 1998.

As a sophomore in 1999, Manuel totaled 118 tackles, three interceptions, two sacks, a forced fumble, and four passes defensed. He started two games at outside linebacker, in addition to seeing significant action at safety, and led the team in tackles.

As a junior in 2000, Manuel served as a key leader on Florida's 10–2 Southeastern Conference (SEC) championship team that earned a berth in the Sugar Bowl.

As a senior team captain in 2001, Manuel helped lead the Gators to a 10–2 record, a 56–23 victory over the Maryland Terrapins in the Orange Bowl, and a final No. 3 ranking in both major polls. He played in 46 games during his collegiate career and totaled 308 tackles, eight sacks, nine tackles for a loss, six fumble recoveries, 22 pass deflections and six interceptions.

Manuel was a four-year SEC Academic Honor Roll honoree. He earned a bachelor's degree in criminal justice from the University of Florida in December 2000 and finished his college football career as a graduate student working toward a master's degree in education counseling with a special emphasis on mental health.

== Professional playing career ==
Pre-draft measurables
Height	Weight	Arm length	Hand span	40-yard dash	Bench press
6 ft 0 in (1.83 m)	209 lb (95 kg)	30 3/4 in (0.78 m)	10 in (0.25 m)	4.52 s	18 reps
All values from NFL Combine

=== Cincinnati Bengals ===
The Cincinnati Bengals selected Manuel in the sixth round (181st overall) of the 2002 NFL draft.

Manuel made his NFL debut against the Cleveland Browns on September 15, 2002, and started for the first time against the Indianapolis Colts and had two tackles.

During the 2003 season, Manuel totaled eight tackles (six solo) in 13 games with one start for the Bengals, and he also added five tackles on special teams.

Manuel was waived on September 5, 2004.

=== Seattle Seahawks ===
Manuel was claimed off waivers by the Seattle Seahawks on September 6, 2004. In his first season with Seattle, Manuel played in 15 games, finishing with 10 tackles (seven solo) on defense and had nine stops on special teams.

In 2005, Manuel was part of the Seahawks team that finished 13–3. During the NFC Championship Game against the Carolina Panthers, he returned an interception 32 yards to set up a touchdown. The Seahawks reached Super Bowl XL, where they lost to the Pittsburgh Steelers 21–10. Manuel started the Super Bowl at free safety but injured his hip in the second quarter and was replaced by Etric Pruitt.

=== Green Bay Packers ===
After Seattle's appearance in the Super Bowl, Manuel was signed by the Green Bay Packers as an unrestricted free agent on March 13, 2006.

Manuel started all 16 games, totaling a career-high 103 tackles to rank fourth on the team. Memorably, he intercepted a pass deflected by Ahmad Carroll and returned it for a 29-yard touchdown against the Detroit Lions on September 24.

Manuel was released on September 1, 2007, during the final preseason roster cuts.

=== Carolina Panthers ===
Manuel was signed by the Carolina Panthers on September 3, 2007. He played for the Panthers for a single season during 2007, playing in sixteen games and starting in two of them.

=== Denver Broncos ===
The Denver Broncos signed Manuel as an unrestricted free agent on March 8, 2008, and he played in all 16 regular season games for the Broncos, starting in 14 of them, and recorded 83 tackles and four pass deflections.

=== Detroit Lions ===
Manuel was signed by the Detroit Lions as a free agent on June 2, 2009. He played in nine games, starting in six of them, and recorded 36 tackles.

Manuel was released on August 4, 2010.

== NFL career statistics ==
Legend
**Bold**	Career high

=== Regular season ===
Year	Team	Games		Tackles					Interceptions					Fumbles			
Year	Team	GP	GS	Cmb	Solo	Ast	Sck	TFL	Int	Yds	TD	Lng	PD	FF	FR	Yds	TD
2002	CIN	15	8	42	32	10	0.0	**2**	0	0	0	0	2	**1**	0	0	0
2003	CIN	13	1	16	12	4	0.0	0	0	0	0	0	1	0	0	0	0
2004	SEA	15	0	19	12	7	0.0	0	0	0	0	0	0	0	0	0	0
2005	SEA	**16**	11	72	59	13	0.0	**2**	0	0	0	0	2	**1**	**1**	0	0
2006	GNB	**16**	**16**	81	**62**	19	0.0	**2**	**1**	**29**	**1**	**29**	3	0	0	0	0
2007	CAR	**16**	2	18	16	2	**1.0**	1	**1**	4	0	4	2	**1**	0	0	0
2008	DEN	**16**	14	**84**	**62**	**22**	0.0	1	0	0	0	0	**4**	0	0	0	0
2009	DET	9	6	36	30	6	0.0	0	0	0	0	0	2	**1**	0	0	0
Total		116	58	368	285	83	1.0	8	2	33	1	29	16	4	1	0	0

=== Postseason ===
Year	Team	Games		Tackles					Interceptions					Fumbles			
Year	Team	GP	GS	Cmb	Solo	Ast	Sck	TFL	Int	Yds	TD	Lng	PD	FF	FR	Yds	TD
2004	SEA	1	0	3	2	**1**	0.0	0	0	0	0	0	0	0	0	0	0
2005	SEA	**3**	**3**	**6**	**5**	**1**	0.0	0	**1**	**32**	0	**32**	**5**	0	0	0	0
Total		4	3	9	7	2	0.0	0	1	32	0	32	5	0	0	0	0

== Coaching career ==
=== Seattle Seahawks ===
On February 14, 2012, the Seattle Seahawks announced that the team had hired Manuel to serve as the assistant special teams coach. A year later, he was named defensive assistant, where he helped the Seahawks with Super Bowl XLVIII. In 2014, Manuel was promoted to assistant secondaries coach, helping the Seahawks reach Super Bowl XLIX, where they lost to the New England Patriots.

=== Atlanta Falcons ===
Manuel was hired by the Atlanta Falcons in 2015 as the defensive backs coach, following Dan Quinn from Seattle to Atlanta.

During the 2016 offseason, Manuel interviewed for the Jacksonville Jaguars defensive coordinator position, though he did not get the job. In the 2016 season, Manuel and the Falcons reached Super Bowl LI, where they lost to the Patriots 34–28 in overtime despite a 28–3 lead at halftime.

On February 10, 2017, Manuel was promoted to defensive coordinator of the Falcons. He let his contract expire with the Falcons after the 2018 season when the team finished with a 7–9 record.

=== Philadelphia Eagles ===
Manuel was hired by the Philadelphia Eagles as their defensive backs coach on February 5, 2020.

=== New York Giants ===
On January 23, 2025, Manuel was hired to serve as the defensive backs coach and defensive pass game coordinator for the New York Giants. On January 21, 2026, it was announced that Manuel would not be retained by the Giants on new head coach John Harbaugh's inaugural staff.

=== Tennessee Titans ===
On February 3, 2026, Manuel was hired as the safeties coach of the Tennessee Titans.

== Personal life ==
Manuel established the Marquand Manuel Foundation to help kids in his hometown of Miami. His oldest brother, John, was a Parade magazine All-American and played football at University of Florida. Marquand is the ninth of nineteen children and has a family of siblings whose ages differ by 25 years from oldest to youngest.

== See also ==
- Florida Gators football, 1990–99
- List of Florida Gators in the NFL draft
- List of University of Florida alumni
