= Robert Gillespie (American football) =

American football player and coach (born 1979)

Current position
- Title: Assistant head coach & running backs coach
- Team: Alabama
- Conference: SEC

Biographical details
- Born: November 2, 1979 (age 46); Hattiesburg, Mississippi, U.S.

Playing career
- 1998–2001: Florida
- 2002: Washington Redskins
- 2003: Frankfurt Galaxy
- 2004: Jacksonville Jaguars*
- Position: Running back

Coaching career (HC unless noted)
- 2005: South Carolina (GA)
- 2006–2008: South Carolina (RB)
- 2009–2010: Oklahoma State (RB)
- 2011–2012: West Virginia (RB)
- 2013–2017: Tennessee (RB)
- 2018–2020: North Carolina (RB)
- 2021–present: Alabama (AHC/RB)

Robert Nolan Gillespie (born November 2, 1979) is an American college football coach and former player. He is the assistant head coach and running backs coach for the University of Alabama, positions he has held since 2021. Gillespie played in the National Football League (NFL) for two seasons in the early 2000s with the Washington Redskins and Jacksonville Jaguars. He played college football for the University of Florida.

== Early years ==
Gillespie was born in Los Angeles, in 1979. He attended Hattiesburg High School in Hattiesburg, Mississippi, and he was a standout high school football player for the Hattiesburg Tigers, rushing for 1,957 yards and twenty-six touchdowns, with another 700 yards receiving. As a senior in 1997, he was a SuperPrep high school All-American.

== College career ==
Gillespie accepted an athletic scholarship to attend the University of Florida in Gainesville, Florida, where he played for coach Steve Spurrier's Florida Gators football team from 1998 to 2001. Spurrier would often rotate Gillespie in and out of games with the Gators' other tailback, Earnest Graham, and the two backs shared time at the position. In four college seasons, he totaled 1,854 yards rushing; he was also a sure-handed receiver out of the Gators' backfield, and became the second all-time Gators running back in career receptions (96) and receiving yards (1,091). He was a team captain during his senior season in 2001, and the Gators defeated the Maryland Terrapins 56–23 in the Orange Bowl, and finished 10–2 and ranked third in both major polls.

After his professional playing career was over, Gillespie returned to Gainesville and completed his bachelor's degree in exercise and sports science in 2005.

== Professional career ==
The Washington Redskins, then led by the former Gators coach Spurrier, signed Gillespie as an undrafted free agent in 2002, and he played for the Redskins for a single season in 2002. He also played for the Frankfurt Galaxy in the NFL Europa in 2003.

== Coaching career ==
=== South Carolina ===
Gillespie started his coaching career as a graduate assistant for the University of South Carolina under Gamecocks head coach Steve Spurrier in 2005, and he was promoted to running backs coach the following season.

=== Oklahoma State ===
After four seasons as a Gamecocks assistant, Gillespie accepted an offer to become the new running backs coach for Oklahoma State University under from Cowboys head coach Mike Gundy in January 2009. In his first season with his new team in 2009, the Cowboys led the Big 12 Conference in rushing offense.

=== West Virginia ===
In 2011, Gillespie became the West Virginia Mountaineers running backs coach at West Virginia University.

=== Tennessee ===
In 2013 Gillespie was named the running backs coach for the Tennessee Volunteers football until parting ways mid February 2018

=== North Carolina ===
In March 2018, Gillespie was named as running backs coach at the University of North Carolina. He coached NFL running backs Antonio Williams, Michael Carter, and Javonte Williams during his tenure as the Tar Heels' RB coach. Carter (2019, 2020) and Javonte Williams (2020) posted 1,000-yard rushing seasons under Gillespie.

=== Alabama ===
In January 2021, Gillespie was named as running backs coach at the University of Alabama replacing Charles Huff, who left to become the head coach at Marshall.

== See also ==
- List of University of Florida alumni
