= 2001 Florida Gators football team =

American college football season

2001 Florida Gators football

Orange Bowl champion

Orange Bowl, W 56–23 vs. Maryland
- Conference: Southeastern Conference
- Eastern Division

Ranking
- Coaches: No. 3
- AP: No. 3
- Record: 10–2 (6–2 SEC)
- Head coach: Steve Spurrier (12th season)
- Offensive scheme: Fun and gun
- Defensive coordinator: Jon Hoke (3rd season)
- Base defense: 4–3
- Captains: Andra Davis; Marquand Manuel; Robert Gillespie; Rob Roberts
- Home stadium: Ben Hill Griffin Stadium

2001 Southeastern Conference football standings
	Conf.			Overall
Team	W		L	W		L
Eastern Division
No. 4 Tennessee x	7	–	1	11	–	2
No. 3 Florida %	6	–	2	10	–	2
No. 13 South Carolina	5	–	3	9	–	3
No. 22 Georgia	5	–	3	8	–	4
Kentucky	1	–	7	2	–	9
Vanderbilt	0	–	8	2	–	9
Western Division
No. 7 LSU xy$	5	–	3	10	–	3
Auburn x	5	–	3	7	–	5
Ole Miss	4	–	4	7	–	4
Alabama	4	–	4	7	–	5
Arkansas	4	–	4	7	–	5
Mississippi State	2	–	6	3	–	8
Championship: LSU 31, Tennessee 20
$ – BCS representative as conference champion; % – BCS at-large representative; x – Division champion/co-champions; y – Championship game participant; Rankings from AP Poll

The 2001 Florida Gators football team represented the University of Florida as a member of the Eastern Division of the Southeastern Conference (SEC) during the 2001 NCAA Division I-A football season. Led by Steve Spurrier in his 12th and final season as head coach, the Gators compiled an overall record of 10–2 with mark of 6–2 in conference play, placing second in the SEC's Eastern Division title. Florida was invited to the Orange Bowl, where the Gators defeated Maryland. The team played home games at Ben Hill Griffin Stadium on the university's Gainesville, Florida campus.

Sophomore quarterback Rex Grossman threw for over 4,000 yards and was Heisman Trophy runner-up. Grossman, wide receiver Jabar Gaffney and defensive end Alex Brown were consensus All-Americans. Brown's 33 sacks is still a school record for a career.

In early January, Spurrier resigned as Florida's head coach.

== Schedule ==
Date	Time	Opponent	Rank	Site	TV	Result	Attendance
September 1	7:15 p.m.	Marshall*	No. 1	Ben Hill Griffin Stadium; Gainesville, FL	ESPN2	W 49–14	85,445
September 8	6:00 p.m.	Louisiana–Monroe*	No. 2	Ben Hill Griffin Stadium; Gainesville, FL	PPV	W 55–6	85,011
September 22	12:30 p.m.	at Kentucky	No. 2	Commonwealth Stadium; Lexington, KY (rivalry)	JPS	W 44–10	66,126
September 29	3:30 p.m.	No. 21 Mississippi State	No. 2	Ben Hill Griffin Stadium; Gainesville, FL	CBS	W 52–0	85,579
October 6	2:30 p.m.	at No. 18 LSU	No. 2	Tiger Stadium; Baton Rouge, LA (rivalry)	CBS	W 44–15	92,010
October 13	6:45 p.m.	at Auburn	No. 1	Jordan–Hare Stadium; Auburn, AL (rivalry)	ESPN	L 20–23	86,063
October 27	3:30 p.m.	vs. No. 15 Georgia	No. 6	Alltel Stadium; Jacksonville, FL (rivalry)	CBS	W 24–10	84,401
November 3	12:30 p.m.	Vanderbilt^{†}	No. 4	Ben Hill Griffin Stadium; Gainesville, FL	JPS	W 71–13	85,052
November 10	7:45 p.m.	at No. 14 South Carolina	No. 4	Williams–Brice Stadium; Columbia, SC (College GameDay)	ESPN	W 54–17	84,900
November 17	8:00 p.m.	No. 20 Florida State*	No. 4	Ben Hill Griffin Stadium; Gainesville, FL (rivalry)	CBS	W 37–13	85,732
December 1	4:30 p.m.	No. 5 Tennessee	No. 2	Ben Hill Griffin Stadium; Gainesville, FL (rivalry, College GameDay)	CBS	L 32–34	85,771
January 2, 2002	8:00 p.m.	vs. No. 6 Maryland*	No. 5	Pro Player Stadium; Miami Gardens, FL (Orange Bowl)	ABC	W 56–23	73,640
*Non-conference game; ^{†}Homecoming; Rankings from AP Poll released prior to the game

The annual rivalry game with Tennessee scheduled for September 15, was rescheduled to the final week of the regular season as a result of the September 11 attacks.

== Before the season ==
The Gators were ranked No. 1 in the preseason.

== Game summaries ==
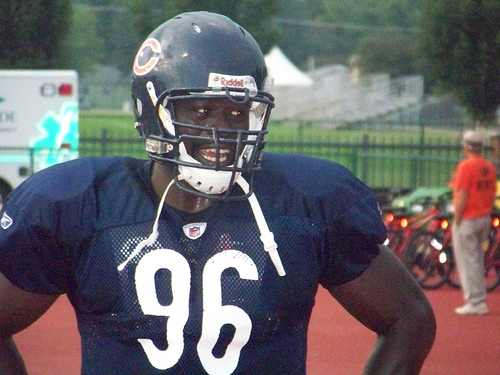
Alex Brown while on the Bears.

=== Marshall ===
Marshall at Florida

Team	1	2	3	4	Total
Marshall	0	0	6	8	14
• Florida	21	14	0	14	49

- Date: September 1
- Location: Ben Hill Griffin Stadium
- Game start: 7:15 p.m. EST
- Game attendance: 85,445
- Television network: ESPN2

Scoring summary
1	7:02	FLA	Earnest Graham 7-yard run (Brendt Talcott kick)	FLA 7-0
1	5:49	FLA	Earnest Graham 6-yard run (Brendt Talcott kick)	FLA 14-0
2	1:33	FLA	Reche Caldwell 28-yard pass from Rex Grossman (Brendt Talcott kick)	FLA 21-0
2	4:18	FLA	R. Gillespie 27-yard pass from Rex Grossman (Brendt Talcott kick)	FLA 28-0
2	0:32	FLA	Taylor Jacobs 64-yard pass from Rex Grossman (Brendt Talcott kick)	FLA 78-0
3	6:30	MAR	Darius Watts 62-yard pass from Byron Leftwich (Curtis Head kick failed)	FLA 35-6
4	14:13	FLA	Earnest Graham 1-yard run (Brendt Talcott kick)	FLA 42-6
4	5:53	MAR	C. Rodgers 2-yard run (Darius Watts pass)	FLA 42-14
4	2:42	FLA	Carlos Perez 25-yard pass from Brock Berlin (Brendt Talcott kick)	FLA 49-14

The season opened at night in the Swamp on September 1 with a 49–14 triumph over quarterback Byron Leftwich and the Marshall Thundering Herd.

Rex Grossman had a career-high in passing yards by halftime, including a 64-yard touchdown reception by Taylor Jacobs.

The defense also played well as Alex Brown and linebacker Andra Davis had two sacks each.

=== Louisiana–Monroe ===
Louisiana–Monroe at Florida

Team	1	2	3	4	Total
La.-Monroe	6	0	0	0	6
• Florida	7	31	14	3	55

- Date: September 8
- Location: Ben Hill Griffin Stadium
- Game start: 6:00 p.m. EST
- Game attendance: 85,011
- Television network: PPV

Scoring summary
1	13:30	ULM	Brown, Ivory 2-yard run (Francis, Daniel kick failed)	ULM 6-0
1	2:53	FLA	Earnest Graham 12-yard run (Jeff Chandler kick)	FLA 7-6
2	14:20	FLA	Reche Caldwell 16-yard pass from Rex Grossman (Jeff Chandler kick)	FLA 14-6
2	11:15	FLA	Jabar Gaffney 10-yard pass from Rex Grossman (Jeff Chandler kick)	FLA 21-6
2	9:18	FLA	Jabar Gaffney 24-yard pass from Rex Grossman (Jeff Chandler kick)	FLA 28-6
2	7:58	FLA	R. Gillespie 1-yard run (Jeff Chandler kick)	FLA 35-6
2	0:00	FLA	Jeff Chandler 29-yard field goal	FLA 38-6
3	6:21	FLA	Earnest Graham 3-yard run (Jeff Chandler kick)	FLA 45-6
3	0:11	FLA	Rob Roberts 3-yard pass from Brock Berlin (Jeff Chandler kick)	FLA 52-6
4	3:23	FLA	Brendt Talcott 28-yard field goal	FLA 55-6

In the second week of play, the Gators overwhelmed the Louisiana–Monroe Warhawks 55–6. Grossman passed for 331 yards and three touchdowns, including two thrown to Jabar Gaffney.

Grossman fumbled the game's first exchange from center, and Louisiana-Monroe capitalized on the opportunity when it scored the game's first touchdown. "It was just an awkward start." said Grossman.

As usual, the Gators and Tennessee Volunteers were slated to meet on the 3rd Saturday of September. However, the SEC canceled all games on the weekend following the September 11 attacks, and all contests were rescheduled for December 1, 2001, requiring the SEC Championship Game to be pushed back a week as well.

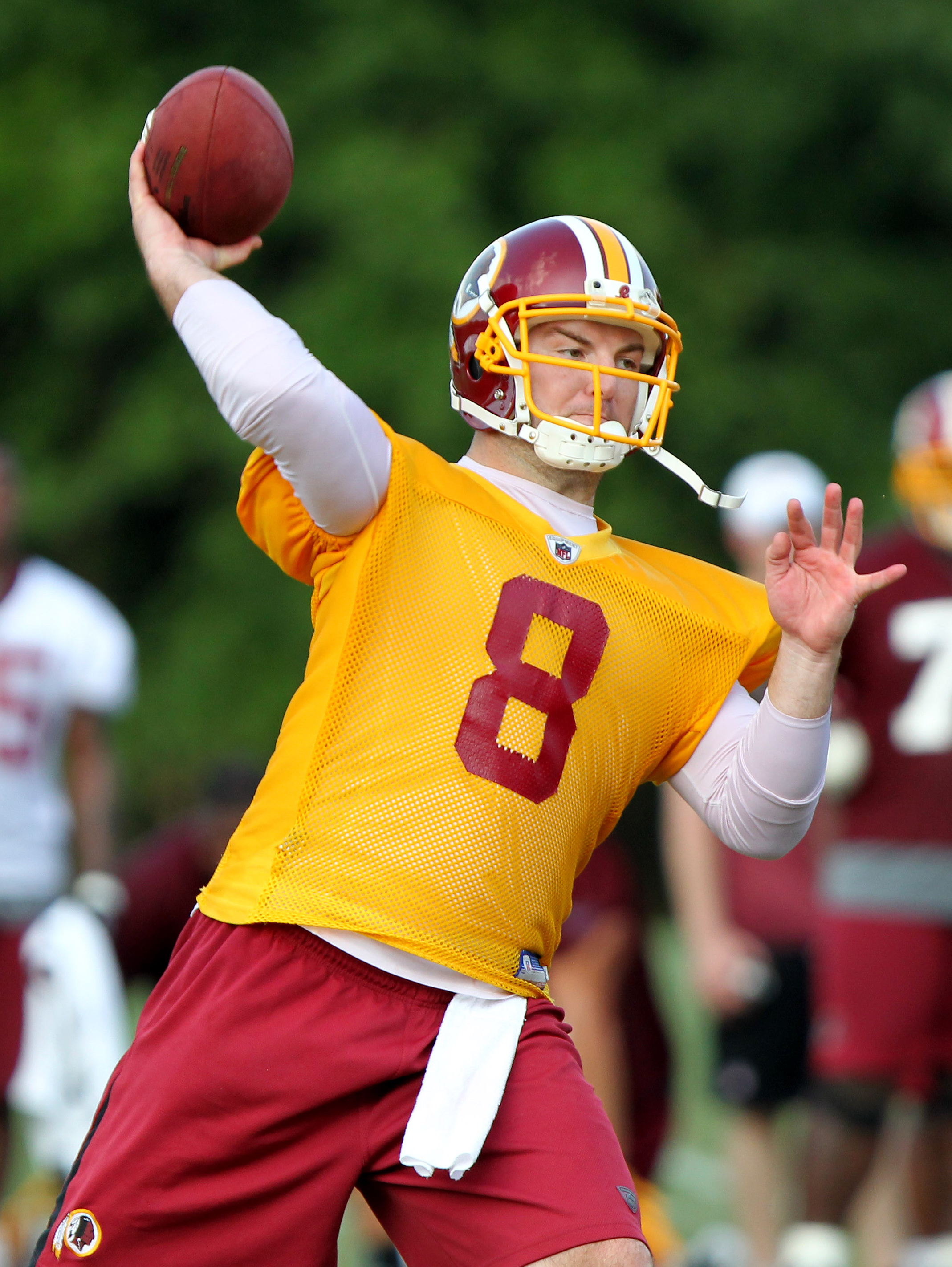
Rex Grossman with the Redskins.

=== Kentucky ===
Florida at Kentucky

Team	1	2	3	4	Total
• Florida	7	9	14	14	44
Kentucky	0	3	7	0	10

- Date: September 22
- Location: Commonwealth Stadium
- Game start: 12:30 p.m. EST
- Game attendance: 66,126
- Television network: JP

Scoring summary
1	9:47	FLA	Jabar Gaffney 29-yard pass from Rex Grossman (Jeff Chandler kick)	FLA 7-0
2	14:38	UK	S. Scaldaferri 41-yard field goal	FLA 7-3
2	9:48	FLA	Taylor Jacobs 6-yard pass from Rex Grossman (UF Team rush failed)	FLA 13-3
2	0:00	FLA	Jeff Chandler 39-yard field goal	FLA 16-3
3	3:27	FLA	Jabar Gaffney 4-yard pass from Rex Grossman (Jeff Chandler kick)	FLA 23-3
3	1:30	UK	Chase Harp 2-yard pass from Shane Boyard (S. Scaldaferri kick)	FLA 23-10
3	0:28	FLA	Earnest Graham 50-yard run (Jeff Chandler kick)	FLA 30-10
4	8:47	FLA	R. Gillespie 52-yard pass from Rex Grossman (Jeff Chandler kick)	FLA 37-10
4	6:42	FLA	Reche Caldwell 64-yard pass from Brock Berlin (Jeff Chandler kick)	FLA 44-10

Florida traveled to Lexington and beat the Kentucky Wildcats 44–10. Grossman passed for 302 yards and four touchdowns.

The Gators struggled early and led just 16–3 at the half, but eventually thrashed the Wildcats with four touchdowns in the second half.

After Kentucky made a touchdown, Earnest Graham sprung lose for a 50-yard touchdown run in the third period to go up 30–10.

=== Mississippi State ===
Mississippi State at Florida

Team	1	2	3	4	Total
Miss St	0	0	0	0	0
• Florida	21	14	7	10	52

- Date: September 29
- Location: Ben Hill Griffin Stadium
- Game start: 3:30 p.m. EST
- Game attendance: 85,579
- Television network: CBS

Scoring summary
1	11:05	FLA	Rex Grossman 1-yard run (Jeff Chandler kick)	FLA 7-0
1	5:09	FLA	Reche Caldwell 20-yard pass from Rex Grossman (Jeff Chandler kick)	FLA 14-0
1	1:54	FLA	Aaron Walker 5-yard pass from Rex Grossman (Jeff Chandler kick)	FLA 21-0
2	6:37	FLA	Reche Caldwell 14-yard pass from Rex Grossman (Jeff Chandler kick)	FLA 28-0
2	2:24	FLA	Taylor Jacobs 60-yard pass from Rex Grossman (Jeff Chandler kick)	FLA 35-0
3	5:04	UK	Ben Troupe 16-yard pass from Rex Grossman (Jeff Chandler kick)	FLA 42-0
4	12:02	FLA	Jeff Chandler 46-yard field goal	FLA 45-0
4	1:45	FLA	Kelvin Kight 23-yard pass from Brock Berlin (Jeff Chandler kick)	FLA 52-0

The following week, Florida avenged last year's loss to the 21st-ranked Mississippi State Bulldogs by shutting them out 52–0. Grossman had 317 yards passing in just the first half. The Gators had 640 yards of total offense on the day, the most in school history for an SEC game.

Grossman passed for 393 yards and five touchdowns in total, becoming the first Florida quarterback to throw for 300 yards in four straight games.

Andra Davis, who missed last year's game, excelled on the defensive side of the ball from his linebacker position with eight tackles and a fumble recovery.

=== LSU ===
Florida at LSU

Team	1	2	3	4	Total
• Florida	21	6	3	14	44
LSU	3	6	0	6	15

- Date: October 6
- Location: Tiger Stadium
- Game start: 2:30 p.m. EST
- Game attendance: 92,010
- Television network: CBS

Scoring summary
1	11:59	FLA	Taylor Jacobs 13-yard pass from Rex Grossman (Jeff Chandler kick)	FLA 7-0
1	7:29	LSU	John Corbello 44-yard field goal	FLA 7-3
1	5:19	FLA	Reche Caldwell 34-yard pass from Rex Grossman (Jeff Chandler kick)	FLA 14-3
1	4:33	FLA	Jabar Gaffney 63-yard pass from Rex Grossman (Jeff Chandler kick))	FLA 21-3
2	12:58	LSU	L. Toefield 2-yard run (John Corbello kick blocked)	FLA 21-9
2	9:48	FLA	Jabar Gaffney 7-yard pass from Rex Grossman (Jeff Chandler kick failed)	FLA 27-9
3	4:20	FLA	Jeff Chandler 42-yard field goal	FLA 30-9
4	14:54	FLA	Aaron Walker 5-yard pass from Rex Grossman (Jeff Chandler kick)	FLA 37-9
4	2:32	FLA	Kelvin Kight 8-yard pass from Brock Berlin (Jeff Chandler kick)	FLA 44-9
4	0:42	LSU	Domanick Davis 1-yard run (John Corbello kick blocked)	FLA 88-15

In Baton Rouge, the Gators defeated the eighteenth-ranked LSU Tigers 44–15. Grossman threw for 319 yards and four touchdowns in just the first half, and by game's end had a school-record 464 yards.

Florida finished with 632 yards of total offense. LSU quarterback Rohan Davey left the game with a hyperextended knee.

"I thought he was a serious candidate for the Heisman Trophy before we played them", said LSU coach Nick Saban, "Now I'm convinced of it." "I think he is a tremendous quarterback" echoed LSU safety Ryan Clark.

=== Auburn ===
Florida at Auburn

Team	1	2	3	4	Total
Florida	3	3	7	7	20
• Auburn	3	7	0	13	23

- Date: October 13
- Location: Jordan–Hare Stadium
- Game start: 6:45 p.m. EST
- Game attendance: 86,063
- Television network: ESPN

Scoring summary
1	11:24	FLA	Jeff Chandler 45-yard field goal	FLA 3-0
1	9:39	AUB	Damon Duval 45-yard field goal	3-3
2	11:03	AUB	Daniel Cobb 1-yard run (Damon Duval kick)	AUB 10-3
2	0:21	FLA	Jeff Chandler 32-yard field goal	AUB 10-6
3	7:48	FLA	Reche Caldwell 20-yard pass from Rex Grossman (Jeff Chandler kick)	FLA 13-10
4	14:55	AUB	Chris Butler 2-yard run (Damon Duval kick)	AUB 17-13
4	12:27	AUB	Damon Duval 32-yard field goal	AUB 20-13
4	12:09	FLA	Jabar Gaffney 80-yard pass from Rex Grossman (Jeff Chandler kick)	20-20
4	0:10	AUB	Damon Duval 44-yard field goal	AUB 23-20

Coach Tommy Tuberville's unranked Auburn Tigers upset the top-ranked Gators 23–20. The Tigers were 21-point underdogs when they met the Gators at Jordan–Hare Stadium.

Gators quarterback Rex Grossman completed twenty-five of forty-two passes for 364 yards and two touchdowns, but also threw four interceptions. The Gators dominated statistically, but the Tigers' bend-but-don't-break defense held the Gators rushing game to negative yardage.

Tigers back-up quarterback Daniel Cobb was not so flashy, but played mistake-free football, and the game was tied at 20 late in the fourth quarter. With 10 seconds left, Tigers placekicker Damon Duval nailed a 44-yard field goal and the Tigers upset the Gators.

=== Georgia ===
Florida–Georgia

Team	1	2	3	4	Total
Georgia	3	7	0	0	10
• Florida	10	7	0	7	24

- Date: October 27
- Location: ALLTEL Stadium
- Game start: 3:30 p.m. EST
- Game attendance: 84,401
- Television network: CBS

Scoring summary
1	11:00	UGA	Billy Bennett 42-yard field goal	UGA 3-0
1	5:23	FLA	Jeff Chandler 32-yard field goal	3-3
1	1:46	FLA	Jabar Gaffney 21-yard pass from Rex Grossman (Jeff Chandler kick)	FLA 10-3
2	7:32	UGA	Jasper Sanks 3-yard run (Billy Bennett kick)	10-10
2	0:46	FLA	Rex Grossman 1-yard run (Jeff Chandler kick)	FLA 17-10
4	9:12	FLA	Reche Caldwell 30-yard pass from Rex Grossman (Jeff Chandler kick)	FLA 24-10

Florida defeated Georgia 24–10 in the annual rivalry game, overcoming four turnovers and twelve penalties. Grossman passed for 407 yards. Earnest Graham rushed for 131 yards.

The Bulldogs missed a field goal and failed to convert three fourth downs in the second half. The lone score of the second half was a 30-yard touchdown pass to Reche Caldwell. Florida moved into a first-place tie with Tennessee.

=== Vanderbilt ===
Vanderbilt at Florida

Team	1	2	3	4	Total
Vanderbilt	0	0	0	13	13
• Florida	24	13	28	6	71

- Date: November 3
- Location: Ben Hill Griffin Stadium
- Game start: 12:30 p.m. EST
- Game attendance: 85,052
- Television network: JP

Scoring summary
1	13:44	FLA	Earnest Graham 2-yard run (Jeff Chandler kick)	FLA 7-0
1	11:51	FLA	Earnest Graham 5-yard run (Jeff Chandler kick)	FLA 14-0
1	6:16	FLA	Jabar Gaffney 7-yard pass from Rex Grossman (Jeff Chandler kick)	FLA 21-0
1	1:29	FLA	Jeff Chandler 37-yard field goal	FLA 24-0
2	12:35	FLA	Taylor Jacobs 13-yard pass from Rex Grossman (Jeff Chandler kick))	FLA 31-0
2	0:07	FLA	Reche Caldwell 18-yard pass from Rex Grossman (Jeff Chandler kick failed)	FLA 37-0
3	14:02	FLA	Andra Davis 25-yard interception return (Jeff Chandler kick)	FLA 44-0
3	10:06	FLA	Taylor Jacobs 2-yard pass from Brock Berlin (Brendt Talcott kick)	FLA 51-0
3	6:17	FLA	Willie Green 5-yard run (Brendt Talcott kick)	FLA 58-0
3	0:00	FLA	Carlos Perez 15-yard pass from Brock Berlin (Brendt Talcott kick)	FLA 65-0
4	8:31	FLA	Kirk Wells 6-yard pass from Brock Berlin (Matt Leach kick failed)	FLA 71-0
4	5:05	VAN	Benji Walker 27-yard run (Chuck Folino kick)	FLA 71-7
4	0:00	VAN	Benji Walker 2-yard run (Chuck Folino kick blocked)	FLA 71-13

At homecoming, Florida crushed the Vanderbilt Commodores 71–13. The Gators never punted, and forced five turnovers. They were up 71–0 in the fourth quarter and still tossing passes, amassing 571 total yards in all. Eleven Gators got receptions, and Taylor Jacobs had a breakout game.

Playing just in the first half, Grossman threw for 306 yards and three touchdowns. Backup quarterback Brock Berlin threw three more in the second.

=== South Carolina ===
Florida at South Carolina

Team	1	2	3	4	Total
• Florida	10	17	13	14	54
S. Carolina	10	0	0	7	17

- Date: November 10
- Location: Williams-Brice Stadium
- Game start: 7:45 p.m. EST
- Game attendance: 84,900
- Television network: ESPN

Scoring summary
1	12:11	SCAR	Derek Watson 7-yard run (Daniel Weaver kick)	SCAR 7-0
1	9:07	FLA	Jeff Chandler 42-yard field goal	SCAR 7-3
1	5:12	SCAR	Daniel Weaver 32-yard field goal	SCAR 10-3
1	1:44	FLA	Jabar Gaffney 11-yard pass from Rex Grossman (Jeff Chandler kick)	10-10
2	12:15	FLA	Rex Grossman 1-yard run (Jeff Chandler kick)	FLA 17-10
2	1:44	FLA	Jeff Chandler 36-yard field goal	FLA 20-10
2	0:26	FLA	Reche Caldwell 11-yard pass from Rex Grossman (Jeff Chandler kick)	FLA 27-10
3	10:27	FLA	Jeff Chandler 46-yard field goal	FLA 30-10
3	3:52	FLA	Jeff Chandler 44-yard field goal	FLA 33-10
3	2:53	FLA	Travis Carroll 24-yard interception return (Jeff Chandler kick)	FLA 40-10
4	11:19	FLA	Jabar Gaffney 59-yard pass from Rex Grossman (Jeff Chandler kick)	FLA 47-10
4	4:28	SCAR	Ryan Brewer 3-yard pass from D. Pinkins (Daniel Weaver kick)	SCAR 47-17
4	2:28	FLA	Kirk Wells 10-yard pass from Brock Berlin (Jeff Chandler kick)	FLA 54-17

In Columbia, the Gators routed the fourteenth-ranked South Carolina Gamecocks 54–17. The game started shaky for the Gators as Lito Sheppard fumbled the opening kickoff, leading to an easy Gamecock score. A touchdown pass to Jabar Gaffney late in the first quarter started the scoring barrage.

Grossman had his ninth-consecutive 300-yard passing game, and exceeded 5,000 yards passing for his career.

=== Florida State ===
Florida State at Florida

Team	1	2	3	4	Total
FSU	0	3	3	7	13
• Florida	7	13	7	10	37

- Date: November 17
- Location: Ben Hill Griffin Stadium
- Game start: 8:00 p.m. EST
- Game attendance: 85,732
- Television network: CBS

Scoring summary
1	6:33	FLA	Earnest Graham 2-yard run (Jeff Chandler kick)	FLA 7-0
2	14:46	FLA	Taylor Jacobs 6-yard pass from Rex Grossman (Jeff Chandler kick)	FLA 14-0
2	7:42	FLA	Jeff Chandler 36-yard field goal	FLA 17-0
2	1:04	FLA	Jeff Chandler 38-yard field goal	FLA 20-0
2	0:00	FSU	Xavier Beitia 39-yard field goal	FLA 20-3
3	6:23	FSU	Xavier Beitia 23-yard field goal	FLA 20-6
3	0:55	FLA	Rex Grossman 1-yard run (Jeff Chandler kick)	FLA 27-6
4	12:59	FSU	P.K. Sam 5-yard pass from Chris Rix (Xavier Beitia kick)	FLA 27-13
4	8:15	FLA	Jabar Gaffney 28-yard pass from Rex Grossman (Jeff Chandler kick)	FLA 34-13
4	2:32	FLA	Jeff Chandler 18-yard field goal	FLA 37-13

Florida easily defeated the rival Florida State Seminoles 37–13. However, the Gators' starting running back Earnest Graham had been controversially injured in Florida's win and was unable the next week to play against Tennessee.

Graham and coach Spurrier accused Darnell Dockett of deliberately twisting Graham's knee, as well as stomping on Grossman's hand. Graham even considered a lawsuit. Dockett denied these charges.

=== Tennessee ===
Tennessee at Florida

Team	1	2	3	4	Total
• Tennessee	14	0	7	13	34
Florida	0	20	3	9	32

- Date: December 1
- Location: Ben Hill Griffin Stadium
- Game start: 4:30 p.m. EST
- Television network: CBS

As the season progressed, the postponed game with Tennessee took on greater and greater importance. Each squad suffered only one close loss and entered the contest with Tennessee ranked No. 6 and Florida ranked No. 2. The winner was to represent the SEC East and face LSU in the SEC Championship. With a win in that game, the Gators or Vols were likely to receive an invitation to the Rose Bowl to face the undefeated Miami Hurricanes with a national title on the line. Despite the teams' identical records and much to the chagrin of the Vols, the Gators were 17-and-a-half point favorites at kickoff.

External videos
- Tennessee game, YouTube video.

The Volunteers went on to dash the Gators' national title hopes with a 34–32 upset, ending a 30-year winless drought against Florida in Gainesville. The star of the game was Volunteer running back Travis Stephens, who rushed for 226 yards and two touchdowns on 19 carries to lead the Vols' attack. Without Graham, Florida managed only 36 total yards on the ground. Gator quarterback Rex Grossman threw 51 times for 362 yards and two touchdowns, but his pass on a potentially game-tying two-point conversion attempt with just over a minute left in the 4th quarter fell incomplete. (Note: Ultimately, neither team would win any championships that season. UT was upset by LSU in the SEC Championship Game the following Saturday and missed their opportunity to play for a second national title in four years. The Vols ended up beating Michigan 45–17 in the Citrus Bowl.)

=== Orange Bowl (vs. Maryland) ===
Orange Bowl: #5 Florida Gators (9–2) vs. #6 Maryland Terrapins (10–1)

Quarter	1	2	3	4	Total
Florida	14	14	21	7	56
Maryland	7	3	0	13	23

at Pro Player Stadium, Miami, Florida

- Date: January 2, 2002
- Game time: 8:00 p.m. EST
- Game weather: Clear, 71 °F (22 °C)
- Game attendance: 73,640
- Referee: James Sprenger
- TV announcers (ABC): Brad Nessler and Bob Griese
- Box Score

Game information

First quarter

- FLA – Earnest Graham 1-yard run (Jeff Chandler kick), 9:51. Florida 7–0. Drive: 10 plays, 83 yards, 3:59.
- FLA – Taylor Jacobs 46-yard pass from Brock Berlin (Jeff Chandler kick), 0:12. Florida 14–0. Drive: 2 plays, 55 yards, 0:47.
- MD – Jafar Williams 64-yard pass from Shaun Hill (Nick Novak kick), 0:00. Florida 14–7. Drive: 1 play, 69 yards, 0:12.

Second quarter

- MD – Nick Novak 20-yard field goal, 12:20. Florida 14–10. Drive: 4 plays, 1 yard, 0:45.
- FLA – Taylor Jacobs 15-yard pass from Rex Grossman (Jeff Chandler kick), 2:18. Florida 21–10. Drive: 10 plays, 72 yards, 3:45.
- FLA – Jabar Gaffney 4-yard pass from Rex Grossman (Jeff Chandler kick), 0:03. Florida 28–10. Drive: 6 plays, 64 yards, 1:21.

Third quarter

- FLA – Earnest Graham 6-yard run (Jeff Chandler kick), 11:02. Florida 35–10. Drive: 10 plays, 65 yards, 3:38.
- FLA – Robert Gillespie 11-yard run (Jeff Chandler kick), 7:26. Florida 42–10. Drive: 4 plays, 74 yards, 1:29.
- FLA – Jabar Gaffney 33-yard pass from Rex Grossman (Jeff Chandler kick), 2:52. Florida 49–10. Drive: 2 plays, 68 yards, 0:19.

Fourth quarter

- MD – Marc Riley 1-yard run (Nick Novak kick), 11:56. Florida 49–17. Drive: 15 plays, 71 yards, 5:56.
- FLA – Carlos Perez 10-yard pass from Rex Grossman (Jeff Chandler kick), 10:16. Florida 56–17. Drive: 4 plays, 69 yards, 1:40.
- MD – Marc Riley 10-yard run (pass failed), 5:10. Florida 56–23. Drive: 14 plays, 80 yards, 5:06.

Top passers

- FLA – Rex Grossman – 20/28, 248 yards, 3 TD
- MD – Shaun Hill – 23/39, 257 yards, INT

Top rushers

- FLA – Earnest Graham – 16 rushes, 149 yards, 2 TD
- MD – Shaun Hill – 11 rushes, 31 yards

Top receivers

- FLA – Taylor Jacobs – 10 receptions, 170 yards, 2 TD
- MD – Matt Murphy – 5 receptions, 42 yards

Florida was invited to the Orange Bowl, where they beat Maryland, 56–23.

Taylor Jacobs was named the game's MVP.

== Roster ==
2001 Florida Gators football team roster
Players
Coaches
Offense

Pos.	#	Name	Class
QB	7	Brock Berlin	So
WR	17	Reche Caldwell	Jr
RB	33	Ran Carthon	So
OL	78	Jonathon Colon
QB	18	Jeff Creveling	Fr
WR	10	Jabar Gaffney	Jr
RB	20	Robert Gillespie	Sr
RB	5	Earnest Graham	Jr
RB	32	Willie Green
QB	8	Rex Grossman	Jr
WR	15	Brian Haugabrook	Sr
WR	19	Matt Jackson	So
WR	6	Taylor Jacobs	Jr
OL	54	David Jorgensen
WR	2	Kelvin Kight	So
OL	72	Thomas Moody
OT	71	Mike Pearson	Jr
WR	23	Carlos Perez	So
RB	44	Rob Roberts
RB	39	Matt Sitter	Sr
WR	11	O.J. Small	So
RB	41	Ray Snell	Fr
OL	75	Shannon Snell
OL	77	Max Starks
WR	89	Brian Stone	Fr
TE	84	Ben Troupe	So
TE	82	Aaron Walker	Jr
TE	83	Kirk Wells	Jr

Defense

Pos.	#	Name	Class
DB	30	Bennie Alexander
DE	13	Alex Brown	Sr
LB	55	Travis Carroll	Sr
LB	45	Andra Davis	Sr
DB	34	Daryl Dixon	Jr
DL	35	Kennard Ellis
LB	43	Matt Farrior	So
LB	42	Byron Hardman
S	26	Todd Johnson	Jr
DL	98	Tron LaFavor
DL	86	Darrell Lee
S	4	Marquand Manuel	Sr
DL	57	Bobby McCray
LB	59	Mike Nattiel	Jr
DB	21	Lester Norwood
DB	1	Keiwan Ratliff	So
DL	60	Bryan Savelio
DB	9	Guss Scott
DL	99	Ian Scott
CB	3	Lito Sheppard	Jr

Special teams

Pos.	#	Name	Class
K	49	Jeff Chandler	Sr
P	14	Matt Leach	Fr
K	93	Brent Talcott

Head coach

- Steve Spurrier

Coordinators/assistant coaches

- Jim Collins (ST/LB/Recruit Coord.)
- Dwayne Dixon (WR)
- Jon Hoke (AHC/DC/DB)
- Lawson Holland (RB)
- Ricky Hunley (DL)
- Rob Glass (Str + Cond)
- John Hunt (OL)
- Jerry Odom (LB)
- Jimmy Ray Stephens (OL/Run Game)
- Buddy Teevens (Asst OC/TE)

Legend

- (C) Team captain
- (S) Suspended
- (I) Ineligible
- Injured
- Redshirt

Roster

== Awards and honors ==
Grossman was the Heisman Trophy runner-up to Nebraska quarterback Eric Crouch, in one of the trophy's closest ballots. Many feel Grossman should have won.

Both Crouch and Grossman made AP All-American.

== Statistics ==
- QB Rex Grossman: 279/423 (66.0%) for 4,144 yards (9.80 YPA) with 38 TD vs. 12 INT (2.84%)
- QB Brock Berlin: 47/79 (59.5%) for 679 yards (8.59 YPA) with 10 TD vs. 3 INT (3.80%)
- RB Earnest Graham: 141 carries for 799 yards (5.67 YPC) with 11 TD. 12 catches for 129 yards (10.75 YPC)
- RB Robert Gillespie: 98 carries for 458 yards (4.67 YPC) with 2 TD. 45 catches for 474 yards (10.53 YPC) with 2 TD
- WR Jabar Gaffney: 74 catches for 1,309 yards (17.69 YPC) with 15 TD
- WR Reche Caldwell: 69 catches for 1,106 yards (16.03 YPC) with 10 TD
- WR Taylor Jacobs: 48 catches for 882 yards (18.38 YPC) with 9 TD
- K Jeff Chandler: 19 FGM and 54 XPM
