= Rex Grossman =

American football player (born 1980)

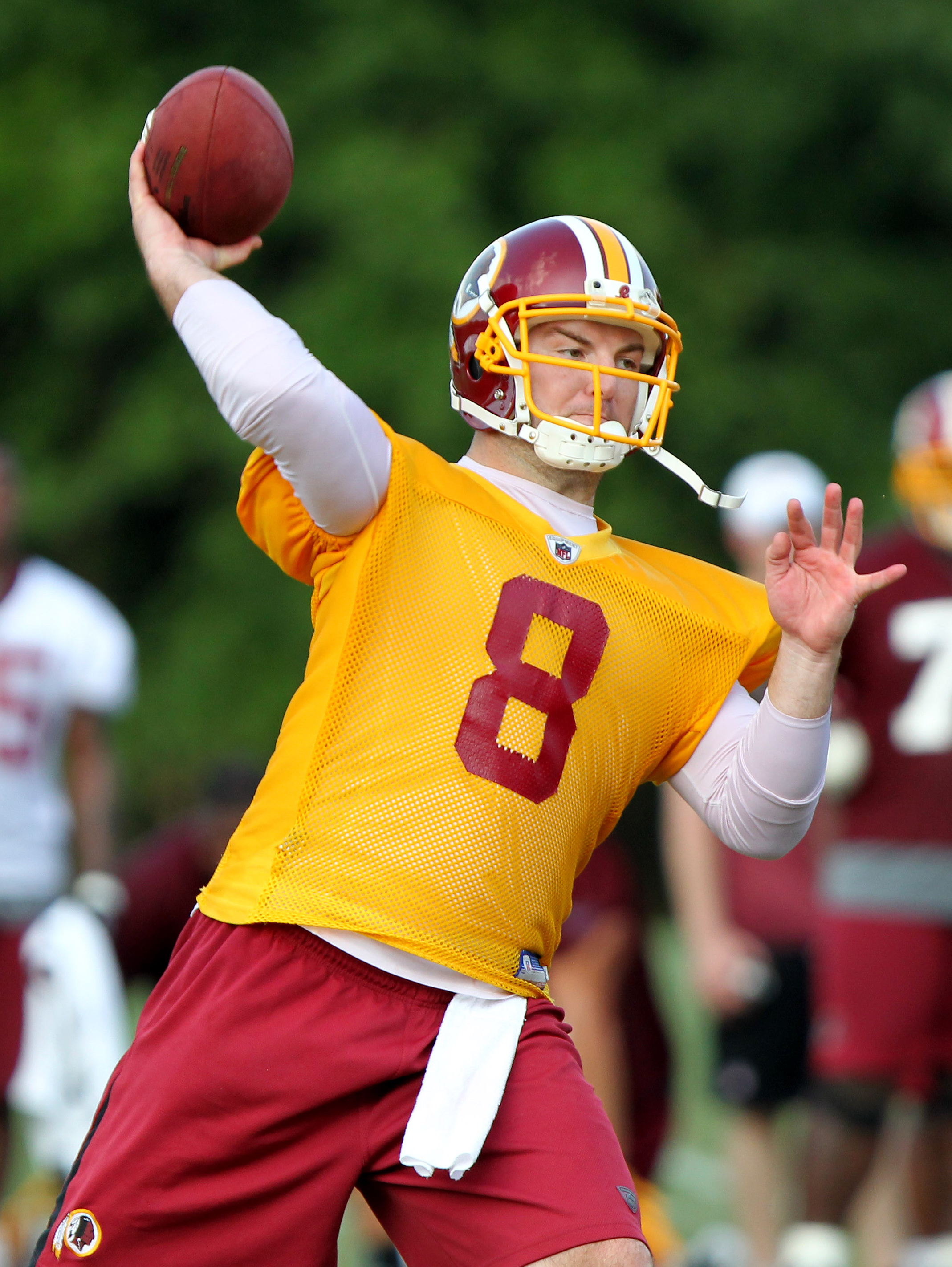
- Grossman with the Washington Redskins in 2011

No. 8, 5
- Position: Quarterback

Personal information
- Born: August 23, 1980 (age 46); Bloomington, Indiana, U.S.
- Listed height: 6 ft 1 in (1.85 m)
- Listed weight: 225 lb (102 kg)

Career information
- High school: Bloomington South
- College: Florida (1999–2002)
- NFL draft: 2003: 1st round, 22nd overall pick

Career history
- Chicago Bears (2003–2008); Houston Texans (2009); Washington Redskins (2010–2013); Cleveland Browns (2014)*; Atlanta Falcons (2015)*
- * Offseason or practice squad member only

Awards and highlights
- AP College Football Player of the Year (2001); Consensus All-American (2001); NCAA passer rating leader (2001); SEC Player of the Year (2001); First-team All-SEC (2001); 2× Second-team All-SEC (2000, 2002); Florida–Georgia Hall of Fame; SEC Football Legends

Career NFL statistics
- Passing attempts: 1,562
- Passing completions: 863
- Completion percentage: 55.2%
- TD–INT: 56–60
- Passing yards: 10,232
- Passer rating: 71.4
- Stats at Pro Football Reference

Rex Daniel Grossman III (born August 23, 1980) is an American former professional football quarterback who played in the National Football League (NFL) for 11 seasons, most notably with the Chicago Bears. Grossman played college football for the Florida Gators, winning AP College Football Player of the Year and SEC Player of the Year in 2001 en route to a victory in the 2002 Orange Bowl. He was selected by the Bears in the first round of the 2003 NFL draft.

Grossman's most successful season was in 2006 when he helped lead the Bears to a conference title and appearance in Super Bowl XLI. Due to inconsistent play, Grossman lost his starting position the following season. He spent the remainder of his career mostly as a backup, last playing as a starter with the Washington Redskins in 2011.

== Early life ==
Grossman was born in Bloomington, Indiana, in 1980, the son of Rex Daniel Grossman II and Maureen Grossman. Under the motivation and guidance of his father, he began playing football at an early age in grade school. He originally started his football career as a running back, and played for a team that was coached by his father. His mother convinced his father to convert him to a quarterback while he was in the sixth grade.

Grossman attended Bloomington High School South, where he played high school football for the Bloomington South Panthers. In three seasons as the Panthers' quarterback, he threw for 7,518 yards and 97 touchdowns. He threw for 3,080 yards and forty-four touchdowns as a senior in 1998, including a game where he threw six touchdowns. His senior season culminated when he led the Panthers to a 35–14 victory over the Homestead High School Spartans in the Indiana Class 5A state championship game. Grossman completed seventeen of twenty-six pass attempts for 216 yards and five touchdowns, setting an Indiana record for the most touchdowns thrown in a championship game.

Grossman was recognized as the 1998 Indiana Player of the Year by USA Today, was ranked among the top fifteen players in the nation by the National Recruiting Advisor, and Parade magazine named him to its high school All-America team. He received statewide honors when he was named Indiana's Mr. Football later that year. Bloomington High School South retired his jersey in the summer of 2007 to commemorate his success during the Chicago Bears' 2006 season.

== College career ==
Grossman accepted an athletic scholarship to attend the University of Florida in Gainesville, Florida, where he played for coach Steve Spurrier and coach Ron Zook's Florida Gators from 1999 to 2002.

=== 2000 ===
After redshirting his freshman year in 1999, Grossman competed for playing time with returning starter Jesse Palmer and the top high school recruit in the country Brock Berlin, in 2000. Grossman started his first game as a Florida Gator on October 7, 2000, against LSU. Grossman had gotten the opportunity to start after completing 13 of 16 pass attempts for 232 yards and two touchdowns against Mississippi State the week before in the Gators' only SEC conference loss of the season. Grossman solidified his position as Florida's starting quarterback during the next two games by throwing for over 500 yards, eight touchdowns and no interceptions in lopsided wins over LSU and Auburn. He led the Gators to the SEC championship and was named Most Valuable Player of the SEC Championship Game. For the season, Grossman completed 61.8 percent of his passes for 1,866 yards, 21 touchdowns, and only seven interceptions. His passer efficiency rating of 161.8 was the third best in NCAA Division I football.

=== 2001 ===
Grossman passed for over 300 yards in nine consecutive games during his sophomore season in 2001. He led the nation in passing efficiency and yards per attempt. Grossman was recognized as a consensus first-team All-American, was voted the Associated Press Player of the Year, and came in second in the balloting for the 2001 Heisman Trophy in one of the closest Heisman votes in the history of the award. At the time, his 55 touchdown passes through his sophomore season were the most in NCAA history. On October 6, 2001, Grossman passed for 464 yards and five touchdowns as No. 2 Florida defeated the No. 18 LSU Tigers 44–15. In a 2006 interview with the Chicago Tribune, Grossman cited the victory as his most memorable game as a Gator. He finished second to Nebraska quarterback Eric Crouch in one of the closest votes in Heisman Trophy history, losing by only 62 votes. He earned accolades as a consensus first-team All-American, the AP National Player-of-the-Year, and finalist for other awards, including the Walter Camp National Player-of-the-Year Award, the Maxwell College Player-of-the-Year Award, and the Davey O'Brien National Quarterback-of-the-Year Award. He ended his sophomore season with a 56–23 victory over the Maryland Terrapins in the 2002 Orange Bowl.

=== 2002 ===
As a junior team captain in 2002, Grossman led the Gators in the famed "Slingin' in the Rain" game against the Tennessee Volunteers, in which he threw three touchdowns and 22 completions in 32 attempts en route to a 30–13 victory over the Vols. Grossman led the Gators to the 2003 Outback Bowl, where they lost to the Michigan Wolverines 38–30 despite his completing 21 of 41 passes for 323 yards and two touchdowns. After the season was over, Grossman decided to forgo his final year of college eligibility and declared for the NFL draft.

In his three-season college career, Grossman threw for 9,164 yards and seventy-seven touchdowns. He earned a 146.77 passer rating, becoming the third most efficient passer in the Southeastern Conference's history. He was twice chosen by his teammates as the Gators' most valuable player, in 2000 and 2001. In one of a series of articles about the top 100 Gators from the first century of Florida football, The Gainesville Sun recognized Grossman as the No. 10 all-time Gator in 2006. He was inducted into the University of Florida Athletic Hall of Fame as a "Gator Great" in 2013. Grossman was also inducted into the SEC Football Legends in 2024.

== Professional career ==
Pre-draft measurables
Height	Weight	Arm length	Hand span	40-yard dash	Wonderlic
6 ft 1 in (1.85 m)	217 lb (98 kg)	32 in (0.81 m)	8 1/2 in (0.22 m)	5.06 s	29
All values from NFL Combine

=== Chicago Bears ===
==== 2003 season ====
The Chicago Bears selected Grossman with the 22nd pick of the first round in the 2003 NFL draft. Head coach Dick Jauron kept Grossman sidelined as a rookie in favor of veteran quarterbacks Chris Chandler and Kordell Stewart. Grossman only saw playing time during the later portion of the 2003 season after the Bears had been eliminated from playoff contention. His season ended when he was forced to leave the final game with a broken finger.

==== 2004 season ====
Prior to the start of the 2004 season, the Bears fired Jauron and hired Lovie Smith, who declared Grossman the team's starting quarterback. Grossman was criticized when he threw a game-ending interception against the Detroit Lions on opening day. Criticism of his durability intensified when Grossman suffered a season-ending ACL injury during a Week 3 loss to the Minnesota Vikings.

==== 2005 season ====
Grossman missed most of the 2005 season after breaking his ankle in a preseason game. On December 18, 2005, he returned to action in relief of Kyle Orton, leading the Bears to a 16–3 victory over the Atlanta Falcons. He completed 11 of 16 passes for 166 yards for a touchdown and interception in a 24–17 victory against the Green Bay Packers during the following week on Christmas Day. The victory enabled the Bears to clinch a playoff berth and the NFC's second playoff seed. Grossman struggled to anchor the Bears' offense in his first career playoff start, completing 17 of 41 passes for 192 yards for one touchdown and an interception in a 29–21 loss against the Carolina Panthers.

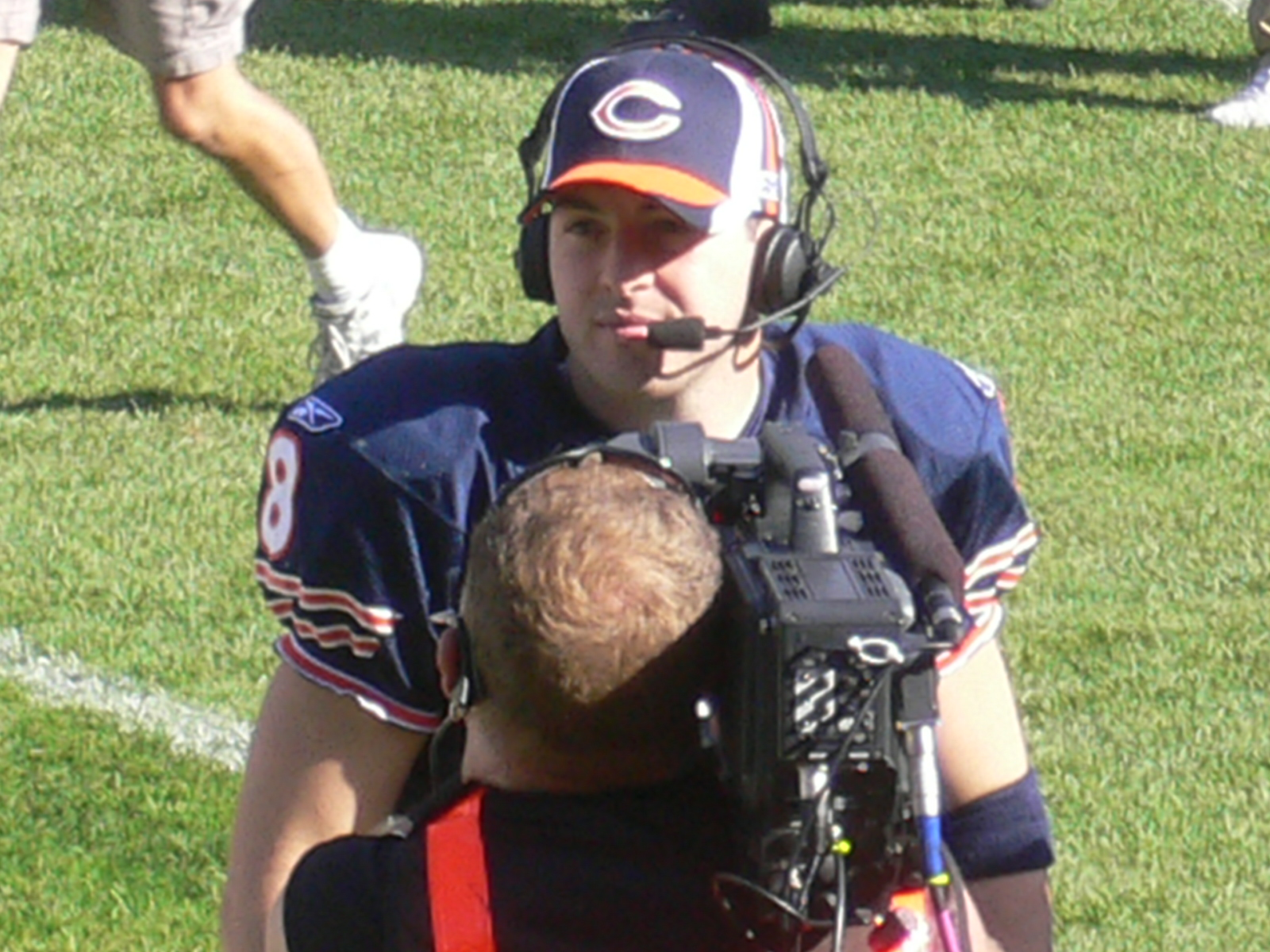
Grossman in a post-game interview in 2006

==== 2006 season: Super Bowl run ====
During the 2006 season, Grossman became the first Bears quarterback to start all sixteen games since Erik Kramer in 1995. In a season dubbed as a "roller coaster ride" by Grossman himself, the fourth-year quarterback had several productive performances, which were seemingly diluted by a handful of turnover-ridden games, especially in Week 6 against the Arizona Cardinals, where Grossman fumbled twice and threw four interceptions. While earning a passer rating of at least 100 in seven games, he earned a sub 50 rating in five games during the latter portion of the season. Grossman, who was recognized as the NFC Offensive Player of the Month in September, concluded the season's final month with a 64.4 passer rating, including a zero rating during the season's finale game against the Green Bay Packers. Grossman's work ethic drew criticism when he admitted that he was not adequately prepared to play and later claimed the game to be "meaningless." He later clarified his statement days later and claimed his quote was taken out of context. His inconsistent performance drew criticism, and calls for Smith to bench Grossman in favor of the veteran Brian Griese.

Nevertheless, Smith, who supported Grossman throughout the season, declared that Grossman would remain the Bears' starting quarterback throughout the playoffs, causing much skepticism within the Chicago area. He temporarily silenced his critics by leading the Bears to a 27–24 victory over the Seattle Seahawks, completing 21 of 38 passes for 282 yards and one interception, fumble, and touchdown. The following week, he led the Bears to a 39–14 victory over the New Orleans Saints, which allowed the Bears to claim the NFC Championship Game and advance to Super Bowl XLI. In the Super Bowl, Grossman completed 20 of 28 passes, including a one-yard touchdown pass. However, he also threw two interceptions, including one that was returned for a touchdown, and fumbled twice due to miscues between him and center Olin Kreutz. The Bears went on to lose to the Indianapolis Colts 29–17. Grossman received the Ed Block Courage Award after the season ended, which is given to one player from every team who exemplifies commitments to the principles of sportsmanship and courage, and is believed to be positive role models to their community.

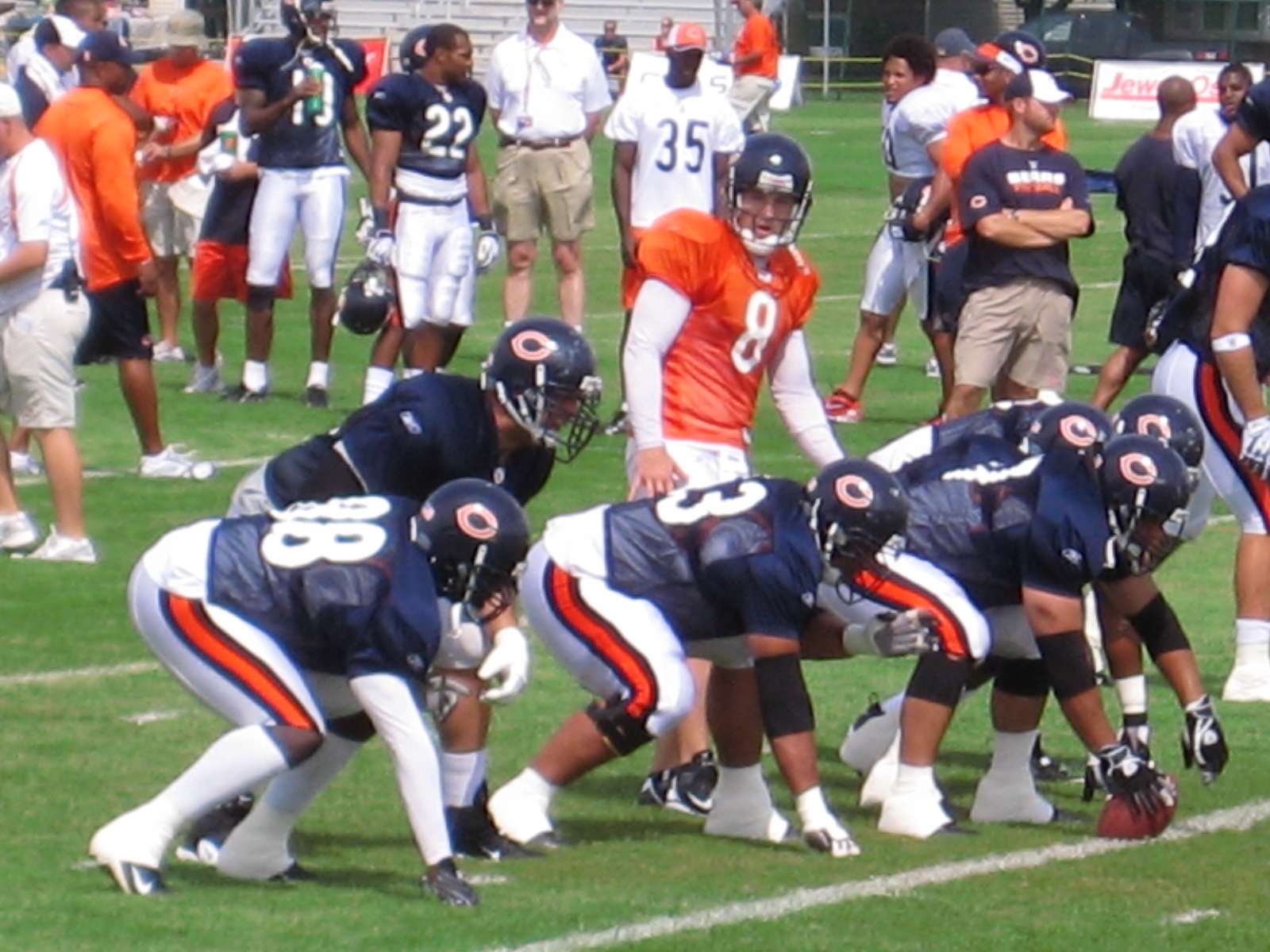
Grossman takes the snap during training camp in 2008.

==== 2007 season ====
Before the 2007 season, Grossman vowed that he would improve his performance by simply "protecting the ball". Smith named him as the team's starting quarterback for the 2007 season, despite inconsistent and lackluster play throughout the preseason. Grossman struggled in his first three outings of the season, and committed ten turnovers with a 45.2 passer rating. After week three, several news sources reported that Smith demoted him in favor of Brian Griese. The official announcement came the next day, when Smith announced that Griese would start in the team's next game. On November 11, 2007, Grossman reclaimed his first-string role after a shoulder injury sidelined Griese. Though Grossman only played for roughly one half, he led the Bears to a 17–6 victory over the Oakland Raiders with a 59-yard touchdown pass to Bernard Berrian. After reclaiming his starting role, Grossman threw three touchdowns and one interception over the course of three and a half games. He sustained a knee injury during his fifth consecutive start and was replaced once again by Griese. Grossman was forced to relinquish his starting position to Kyle Orton, who had previously temporarily relieved him after his 2005 preseason injury.

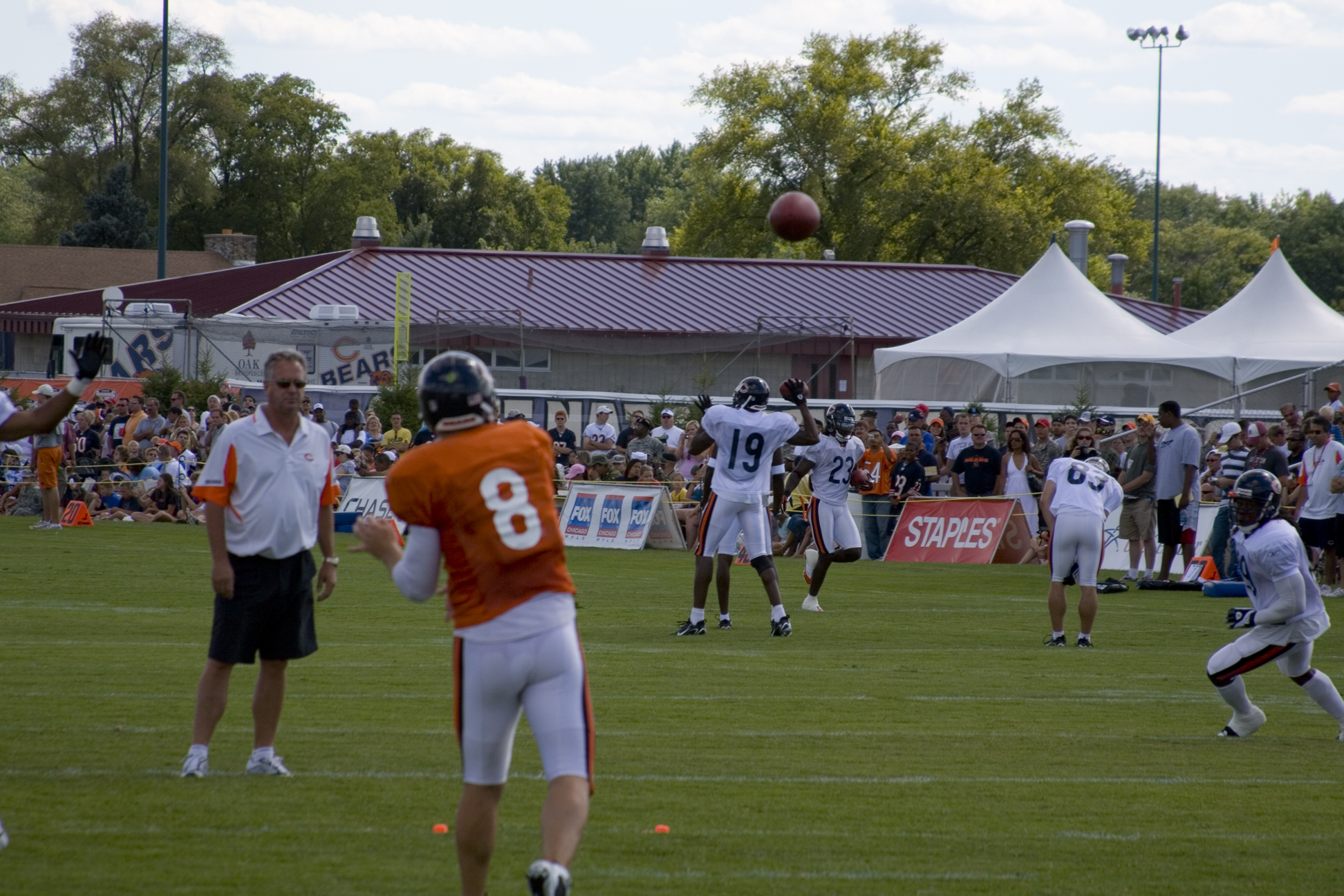
Grossman practices with the Bears in 2008 at Bourbonnais, Illinois.

==== 2008 season ====
Grossman became an unrestricted free agent after the 2007 season, but said he wished to return to the Bears. Bears general manager Jerry Angelo said, "We would like to have Rex back in the mix." He added that Grossman will face additional competition if he returns, emphasizing the team's need for a stable passing game. Smith had also voiced similar opinions. Grossman signed a new one-year contract with the Bears on February 23, 2008. Under terms of the deal, Grossman had a $3 million base salary. The Bears also granted Orton a contract extension and planned to have the two compete for a starting position. On August 18, 2008, after two preseason games, Coach Smith named Orton as the team's starting quarterback for the 2008 season.

Grossman remained the team's back-up quarterback until week nine against the winless Detroit Lions when he was called to replace Orton who left the game due an ankle injury. Grossman completed nine of nineteen passes for 58 yards, including a touchdown and interception. He also scored the game's winning touchdown on a quarterback sneak. Grossman was repeatedly jeered by Bears fans over the course of the game. Brian Urlacher defended Grossman after the game, commenting, "We've got a quarterback who comes in off the bench and leads us to a victory, and they boo him right out of the gate. Poor guy. Lucky for him he's resilient and he came back and led us to two scoring drives. But man, it's tough." Smith named Grossman the team's starting quarterback for the Bears' next contest against the Tennessee Titans. Grossman threw one touchdown and interception, and also scored a one-yard rushing touchdown, en route to a 21–14 loss. Grossman received his final snaps of the season in the following week, when he was called to relieve Orton in a 37–3 loss to the Green Bay Packers.

=== Houston Texans ===
Grossman became a free agent on March 1, 2009. Bears head coach Lovie Smith said that Grossman was not in the team's plans for the 2009 season. During the offseason, Grossman worked out with the Cincinnati Bengals in March, but was not offered a contract. UFLaccess.com reported that Grossman would be participating in drills in a United Football League "Pro Day". However, Grossman's agent, Drew Rosenhaus, denied these claims, stating that "Rex will be playing in the NFL this season. We have not considered any other leagues. He will be on an NFL roster by the start of training camps."

On June 12, Grossman came to terms with the Houston Texans and signed a one-year contract, worth $620,000. Grossman beat out Dan Orlovsky during the preseason for the backup quarterback position. Grossman only played in a single game during the 2009 season, temporarily relieving Matt Schaub in a 23–18 loss to the Jacksonville Jaguars. He threw nine passes for three completions, 33 yards, and one interception.

=== Washington Redskins ===
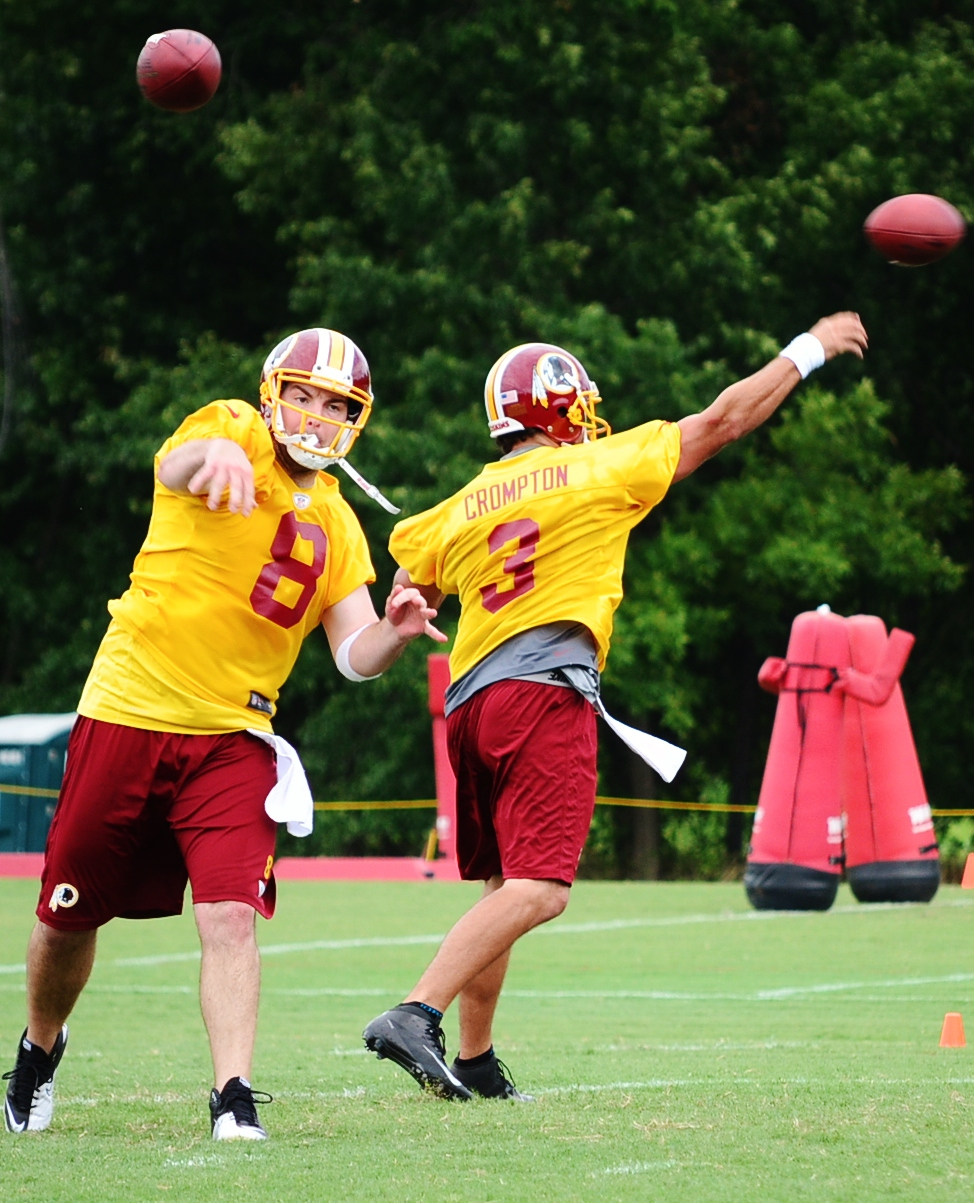
Grossman and Jonathan Crompton at Redskins training camp in 2012

==== 2010 season ====
Grossman signed a one-year contract with the Washington Redskins for the 2010 season on March 17, 2010. Grossman made his first appearance for the Redskins against the Detroit Lions on October 31, 2010, but he was sacked and lost a fumble on his first play, which was returned by Lions defensive tackle Ndamukong Suh for a touchdown. On December 17, Redskins coach Mike Shanahan benched Donovan McNabb in favor of Grossman, who had not been a starter since 2008. The Redskins fell behind the Dallas Cowboys early in the game, but Grossman threw for 322 yards, four touchdowns, and two interceptions to erase a 20-point deficit. The Cowboys still managed to win the game, 33–30. Grossman won his second start with Washington in a close and important game for the Jacksonville Jaguars in Jacksonville.

==== 2011 season ====
On August 2, 2011, Grossman re-signed with the Redskins. At the end of the 2011 pre-season, after a quarterback battle with John Beck, Grossman was chosen to be the opening day starting quarterback of the Redskins. Grossman started the 2011 season with a win against the eventual Super Bowl champion New York Giants, completing 21 of 34 attempts while throwing for 305 yards and two touchdowns. Grossman would lead the Redskins to a 3–1 start before being benched in a four-interception week 6 performance against the Philadelphia Eagles in favor of Beck. Grossman returned week 10 in a loss to the Miami Dolphins. He led a last-minute touchdown drive the next week to tie the Dallas Cowboys but lost in overtime. He helped the Redskins snap a six-game skid the next week with a 23–17 win over the Seattle Seahawks in which he threw 314 yards, two interceptions, and two touchdowns.

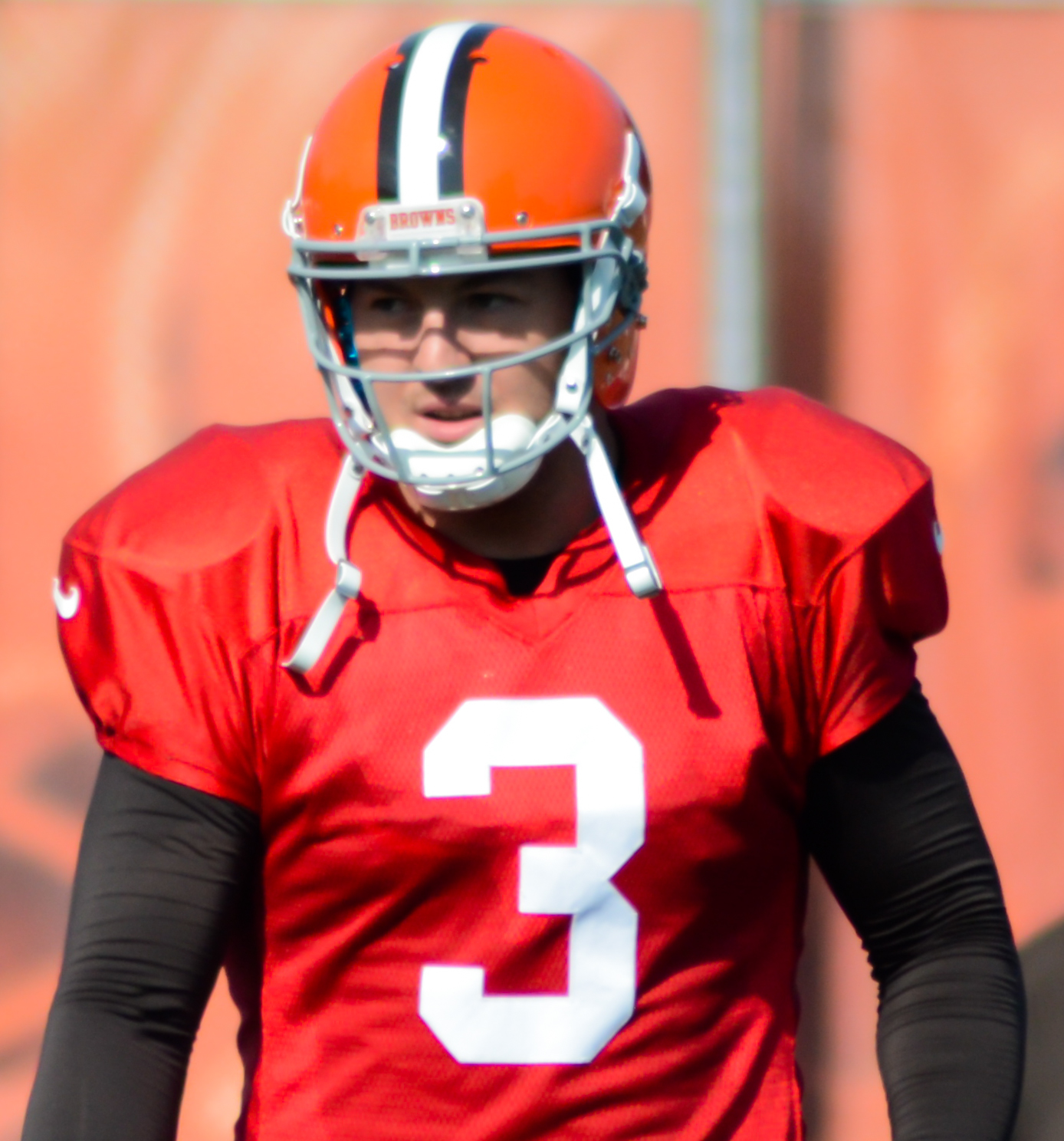
Grossman with the Cleveland Browns in 2014

==== 2012 season ====
The Redskins re-signed Grossman to another one-year contract on March 17, 2012. The Redskins drafted Robert Griffin III (second overall) and Kirk Cousins (102nd overall) in the 2012 NFL draft. Grossman became the team's third-string quarterback and did not play in a single game for the team in 2012.

==== 2013 season ====
On April 3, 2013, Grossman signed another one-year contract to stay with the Redskins for 2013. He remained the team's third-string quarterback and primarily served to advise Griffin III and Cousins.

=== Cleveland Browns ===
The Cleveland Browns signed Grossman on August 12, 2014 and cut him on August 31. On December 22, the Browns offered Grossman a one-week $53,529 NFL veteran league minimum contract after losing Johnny Manziel and Brian Hoyer to injuries. Grossman passed on the offer in order to spend the holidays in Palm Beach with his family.

=== Atlanta Falcons ===
On August 26, 2015, Grossman signed a one-year contract with the Atlanta Falcons. The Falcons released him on September 4.

== Career statistics ==
=== NFL ===
The following is a list of Grossman's statistics from his regular and postseason games. Grossman has occasionally recorded notable statistics; among all quarterbacks during the 2006 season, Grossman ranked tenth in number of pass attempts, seventh in touchdowns thrown, and third in interceptions. He completed his first full season with a 73.9 quarterback rating. This was better than quarterback ratings of Favre, Peyton Manning, and Terry Bradshaw during their first full seasons; many other quarterbacks have performed similarly or better in their first years, including Grossman's former backup Brian Griese. His 23 touchdowns in one season rank Grossman among the best Bears quarterbacks in franchise history. However, his 20 interceptions in one season are among the most thrown by any Bears’ quarterback in almost two decades. The unusual combination ranked Grossman as statistically the most inconsistent quarterback in almost a decade in 2006. Grossman has the NFL record for worst passer rating in a victory with at least 15 passing attempts, recording a 1.3 rating in a 23–13 Chicago Bears win over the Minnesota Vikings on December 3, 2006. In the same year, Grossman became the first quarterback to throw more interceptions than completions in a game with more than 10 passing attempts.

A graph illustrating Grossman's varying passer rating over the 2006 season

Legend
**Bold**	Career high

==== Regular season ====
Year	Team	Games			Passing								Rushing				Sacks		Fumbles (Note: Fumbles lost data taken from Pro Football Reference career game log)	
Year	Team	GP	GS	Record	Cmp	Att	Pct	Yds	Y/A	TD	Int	Rtg	Att	Yds	Avg	TD	Sck	SckY	Fum	Lost
2003	CHI	3	3	2–1	38	72	52.8	437	6.1	2	1	74.8	3	−1	−0.3	0	4	41	3	0
2004	CHI	3	3	1–2	47	84	56.0	607	**7.2**	1	3	67.9	11	**48**	**4.4**	1	5	22	2	2
2005	CHI	2	1	1–0	20	39	51.3	259	6.6	1	2	59.7	0	0	0.0	0	1	9	0	0
2006	CHI	16	16	**13–3**	262	**480**	54.6	**3,193**	6.7	**23**	**20**	73.9	**24**	2	0.1	0	21	142	**8**	**5**
2007	CHI	8	7	2–5	122	225	54.2	1,411	6.3	4	7	66.4	14	27	1.9	0	**25**	198	6	3
2008	CHI	4	1	0–1	32	62	51.6	257	4.1	2	2	59.7	3	4	1.3	**2**	2	8	0	0
2009	HOU	1	0	–	3	9	33.3	33	3.7	0	1	5.6	3	9	3.0	0	0	0	1	0
2010	WAS	4	3	1–2	74	133	55.6	884	6.6	7	4	**81.2**	3	6	2.0	0	9	77	4	4
2011	WAS	13	13	5–8	**265**	458	**57.9**	3,151	6.9	16	**20**	72.4	20	11	0.6	1	**25**	**201**	**8**	**5**
Career		54	47	25–22	863	1,562	55.2	10,654	6.5	56	60	71.4	81	106	1.3	4	92	698	32	19

==== Postseason ====
Year	Team	Games			Passing								Rushing				Sacks		Fumbles	
Year	Team	GP	GS	Record	Cmp	Att	Pct	Yds	Y/A	TD	Int	Rtg	Att	Yds	Avg	TD	Sck	SckY	Fum	Lost
2005	CHI	1	1	0–1	17	41	41.5	192	4.7	1	1	54.1	1	**5**	**5.0**	0	1	7	0	0
2006	CHI	3	3	**2–1**	**52**	**92**	**56.5**	**591**	**6.4**	**3**	**3**	**73.2**	**4**	-3	-0.8	0	**4**	**42**	**3**	**2**
Total		4	4	2–2	69	133	51.9	783	5.9	4	4	67.3	5	2	0.4	0	5	49	3	2

=== College ===
Legend
Led the NCAA

Season	Team	Games			Passing								Rushing			
Season	Team	GP	GS	Record	Cmp	Att	Pct	Yds	Avg	TD	Int	Rate	Att	Yds	Avg	TD
1999	Florida	0	0	—	Redshirted											
2000	Florida	11	7	**6–1**	131	212	61.8	1,866	8.8	21	7	161.8	27	-76	-2.8	0
2001	Florida	11	11	9–2	259	395	**65.6**	**3,896**	**9.9**	**34**	12	**170.8**	34	**8**	**0.2**	**5**
2002	Florida	13	13	8–5	**287**	**503**	57.1	3,402	6.8	22	**17**	121.5	**58**	-65	-1.1	1
Totals		35	31	23–8	677	1,110	61.0	9,164	8.3	77	36	146.7	119	-133	-1.1	6

== Playing style ==
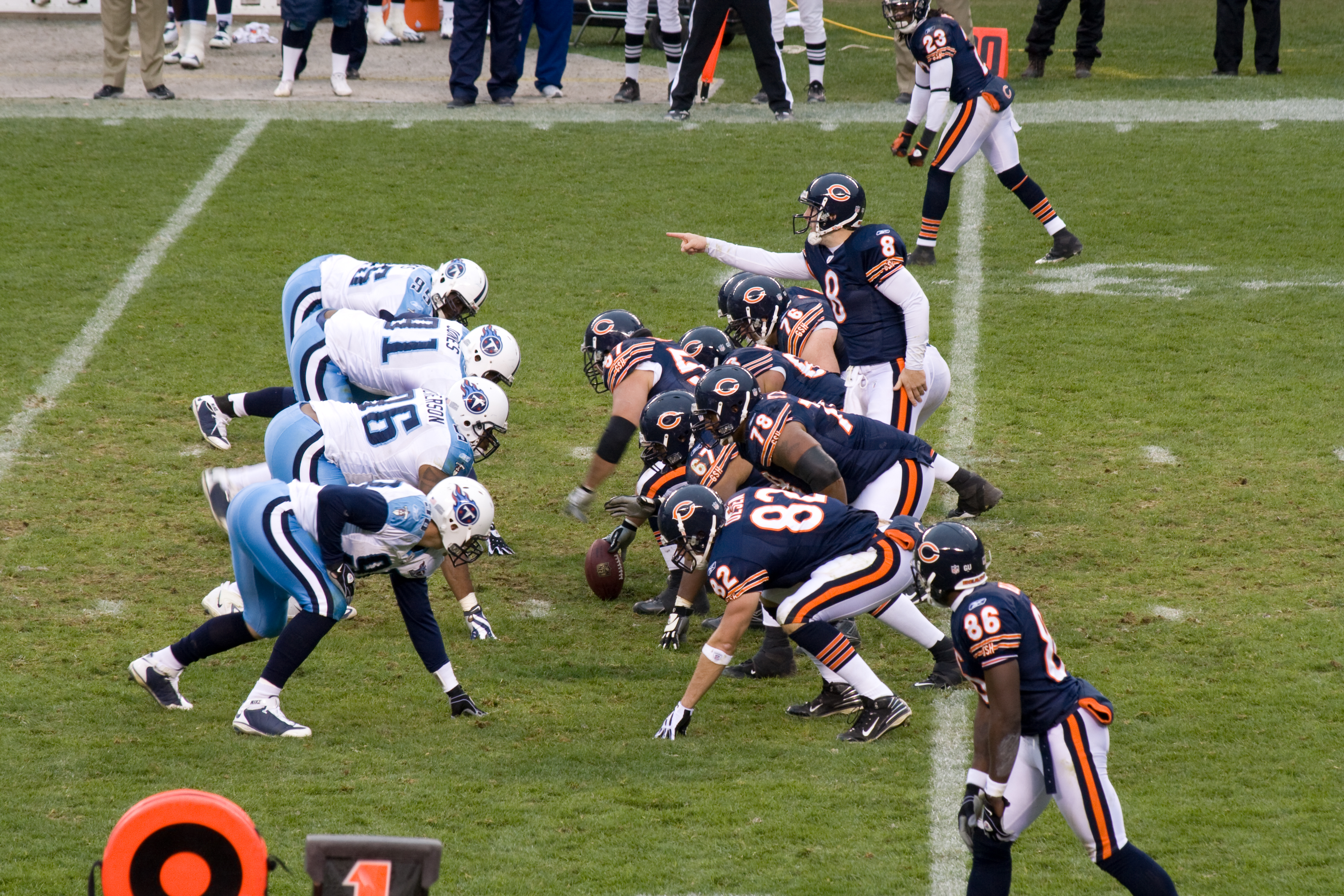
Grossman calls an audible after looking over the Tennessee Titans defense in 2008.

Grossman's gunslinger attitude was illustrated in his desire to throw long passes, similar to his youth idol, Brett Favre. Grossman commented on his non-conservative play style in a 2017 interview stating, "Coach Spurrier instilled in me, don't check down if the big play's there. So that's kind of how I was born. I always wanted to shoot a three-pointer in basketball, hit a home run in baseball. I don't know why, that's just, like, who I am." During Week 12 of the 2006 season, Grossman threw a game-ending interception while attempting a deep pass to Rashied Davis. However, during a Divisional Round game in the 2006 playoffs, he threw a 68-yard touchdown pass to Berrian on the opening play of the Bears’ second drive.

Grossman's ability to elude pursuers and scramble significantly decreased after a season-ending leg injury in 2004. Grossman amassed more rushing yards in three games in 2004 than he did in sixteen games in 2006. He showed his potential to scramble during a game against the St. Louis Rams, after he converted a third and long with a twenty-two-yard run. The run was the longest of Grossman's career but it only gave him five net yards for the season at that point.

== Nicknames ==
Grossman earned several nicknames over the course of his football career. While at the University of Florida, head coach Steve Spurrier dubbed him "Sexy Rexy." The nickname earned national recognition when teammate Muhsin Muhammad used the nickname while introducing Grossman during a starting line-up segment on Monday Night Football. Grossman was also infamously known as "Rex Glassman" and "Wrecks Grossman" due to his injury-prone years. After the midpoint of the 2006 season, commentators and fans would refer to Grossman as either "Good Rex" or "Bad Rex" depending on how he performed in a game.

== Family and personal life ==
Grossman's family has a long football history. His father and grandfather were football players for Indiana University. His grandfather, Rex Sr., also played for the Baltimore Colts (1948–1950) and Detroit Lions (1950), playing in 37 games during his career. Grossman resides in Bloomington, Indiana during the offseason with his wife, Alison Miska, to whom he has been married since July 9, 2005. Grossman also has a sister and nephew who live in Lincolnwood, Illinois, and his parents are friends with Archie Manning.

Grossman has been a longtime admirer of former Packers quarterback, Brett Favre and former Bears quarterback Jim Harbaugh. Grossman was also an avid fan of the Indianapolis Colts and Indiana Pacers fan during his childhood. Outside of football, he enjoys playing basketball and watching movies. He also appeared on the cover of Sports Illustrated for Kids' February 2007 issue. The cover featured Grossman with teammates Devin Hester and Tommie Harris posing with bears in a museum exhibit.

It was reported that Grossman absorbed a $680,000 loss on his September 2008 purchase of a 36th floor condo in the Trump International Hotel & Tower Chicago when it sold in January 2010, losing 25% of his initial investment.

On June 28, 2007, Grossman's hometown of Bloomington, Indiana, declared the day "Rex Grossman Day" for his accomplishments in football and the community. Grossman held an annual charity golfing event for the Boys & Girls Clubs of America, raising over $100,000 for them.

Grossman and his wife founded Florida Medical Staffing in 2009, a staffing agency for nurses that is based in Delray Beach, Florida.

== See also ==
- 2001 College Football All-America Team
- List of NCAA major college football yearly passing leaders
- List of NCAA major college football yearly total offense leaders
- List of Chicago Bears first-round draft picks
- List of Chicago Bears players
- List of Florida Gators football All-Americans
- List of Florida Gators in the NFL draft
- List of SEC Most Valuable Players
- List of University of Florida alumni
- List of University of Florida Athletic Hall of Fame members
- List of Washington Redskins players
