= Taylor Jacobs =

American football player (born 1981)

No. 86, 84, 88, 19
- Position: Wide receiver

Personal information
- Born: May 30, 1981 (age 45); Tallahassee, Florida, U.S.
- Listed height: 6 ft 0 in (1.83 m)
- Listed weight: 210 lb (95 kg)

Career information
- High school: FAMU Developmental Research (Tallahassee)
- College: Florida
- NFL draft: 2003: 2nd round, 44th overall pick

Career history
- Washington Redskins (2003–2005); San Francisco 49ers (2006–2007); Denver Broncos (2007)

Awards and highlights
- First-team All-SEC (2002); Orange Bowl MVP (2002)

Career NFL statistics
- Receptions: 37
- Receiving yards: 384
- Receiving touchdowns: 2
- Stats at Pro Football Reference

Taylor Houser Jacobs (born May 30, 1981) is an American former professional football player who was a wide receiver for five seasons in the National Football League (NFL). He played college football for the Florida Gators and was selected in the second round of the 2003 NFL draft. He played in the NFL for the Washington Redskins, San Francisco 49ers and Denver Broncos.

== Early life ==
Jacobs was born in Tallahassee, Florida in 1981. He attended Florida A&M University's Developmental Research High School in Tallahassee, and played high school football for the FAMU DRS Rattlers. He was named to PrepStar's high school All-America team. He caught thirty-seven passes for 685 yards and six touchdowns as a senior. As a junior, he caught thirty-three passes for 708 yards and eleven touchdowns and rushed for 362 yards. He was also an outstanding baseball player and gifted track athlete. In 1999, he clocked automatic times of 10.50 and 22.05 seconds, respectively, in the 100-meter and 200-meter dash finals at the Florida Class 1A track and field championship meet.

== College career ==
Jacobs accepted an athletic scholarship to attend the University of Florida in Gainesville, Florida, where he played for coach Steve Spurrier and coach Ron Zook's Florida Gators football team from 1999 to 2002. In 1999, Jacobs was the only true freshman wide receiver to play, appearing in ten of twelve games including the Citrus Bowl. As a sophomore in 2000, he played in all twelve regular-season games with five starts, and recorded seventeen receptions for 198 yards and two touchdowns. As a junior in 2001, Jacobs played in all twelve games with three starts including the Orange Bowl, and posted thirty-eight catches for 712 yards and seven touchdowns. As a senior team captain in 2002, Jacobs was Florida's most productive receiver—he finished with seventy-one receptions for 1,088 yards, an average of 98.8 receiving yards per game, and had four 100-yard receiving games. Despite missing two game due to injury he was one of ten semifinalists for the Biletnikoff Award, was a first-team All-Southeastern Conference (SEC) selection, and played in the Senior Bowl and the Hula Bowl all-star games.

Jacobs returned to the University of Florida after his NFL career was over, and completed his bachelor's degree in sociology in 2009.

== Professional career ==
Pre-draft measurables
Height	Weight	Arm length	Hand span
6 ft 0 3/8 in (1.84 m)	205 lb (93 kg)	31 in (0.79 m)	10 in (0.25 m)
All values from NFL Combine

=== Washington Redskins ===
The Washington Redskins, led by Jacobs' former head coach at Florida, Steve Spurrier, selected Jacobs in the second round (forty-fourth pick overall) in the 2003 NFL draft. He played for the Redskins from 2003 to 2005. Jacobs saw limited playing time as he struggled through a series of injuries in his rookie season in 2003. He finished his rookie campaign with eight games played, three catches for 37 yards and a touchdown. In 2004, he appeared in 15 games with four starts. He logged 16 catches for 178 yards, an 11.1 yards per catch average, with a long of 45.

=== San Francisco 49ers ===
Jacobs was traded to the San Francisco 49ers on August 14, 2006, for Mike Rumph, and released on October 2, 2007.

=== Denver Broncos ===
Jacobs was signed by the Denver Broncos on November 6, 2007, and released on August 26, 2008.

== See also ==
- List of Florida Gators in the NFL draft
- List of University of Florida alumni
- List of Washington Redskins players
