= Brock Berlin =

American football player (born 1981)

No. 3, 13
- Position: Quarterback

Personal information
- Born: July 4, 1981 (age 45); Shreveport, Louisiana, U.S.
- Listed height: 6 ft 1 in (1.85 m)
- Listed weight: 215 lb (98 kg)

Career information
- High school: Evangel Christian Academy (Shreveport)
- College: Florida (2000–2001); Miami (FL) (2002–2004)
- NFL draft: 2005: undrafted

Career history
- Miami Dolphins (2005–2006)*; → Hamburg Sea Devils (2006); Dallas Cowboys (2007)*; St. Louis Rams (2007–2008); Detroit Lions (2009)*
- * Offseason or practice squad member only

Awards and highlights
- Second-team All-ACC (2004)

Career NFL statistics
- Passing attempts: 31
- Passing completions: 18
- Completion percentage: 58.1%
- TD–INT: 0–1
- Passing yards: 159
- Passer rating: 58.4
- Stats at Pro Football Reference

Brock Sterling Berlin (born July 4, 1981) is an American former professional football player who was a quarterback in the National Football League (NFL). He played college football for the Florida Gators and Miami Hurricanes. Berlin was signed by the Miami Dolphins of the NFL as an undrafted free agent in 2005, and was also a member of the Hamburg Sea Devils, Dallas Cowboys, St. Louis Rams, and Detroit Lions.

== Early life ==
Berlin was born in Shreveport, Louisiana, and attended Evangel Christian Academy in Shreveport, where he played quarterback for the football team. He helped lead Evangel Christian to three consecutive Louisiana state high school football championships. He was recognized as a Parade All-American. He won numerous personal honors, including being named Gatorade National Player of the Year and USA Today National Offensive Player of the Year.

== College career ==
=== University of Florida ===
After a long recruiting battle for his services, Berlin chose to accept an athletic scholarship to attend the University of Florida, where he played for coach Steve Spurrier's Florida Gators football team during the 2000 and 2001 seasons. His career as a Florida Gator never panned out, though, as he found himself stuck behind Rex Grossman on the team's depth chart. Given the chance to start the 2002 Orange Bowl against Maryland because Grossman was benched for violating curfew, Berlin performed adequately. He engineered two scoring drives out of six opportunities in the first 24 minutes, including one touchdown pass and two interceptions. Grossman came in late in the first half and played a brilliant game, solidifying his status as the Gators' starting quarterback for the following season. Berlin played in twelve games for the Gators over two seasons, throwing for 849 yards, 12 touchdowns, and four interceptions while completing 64-of-106 passes (60.4%).

=== University of Miami ===
After the 2001 season, Berlin transferred to the University of Miami, where he would have the opportunity to play for the defending national champion Miami Hurricanes. As required by NCAA transfer regulations, Berlin sat out the 2002 season, which he spent running Miami's scout team.

==== 2003 season ====
After incumbent quarterback Ken Dorsey's graduation, Berlin took over the starting job for the 2003 season. Berlin's first season was marked by inconsistency. In his first home game as a Miami Hurricane, Berlin squared off against his old team, the Florida Gators. The Hurricanes fell behind 33–10 in the third quarter and Berlin began to hear boos from the crowd as it appeared Miami's then-33 game regular season winning streak was about to end. Berlin, though, caught fire as the team switched to a shotgun offense and rallied Miami to 28 unanswered points. The 38–33 victory was the greatest comeback in Miami history. He also stoked the fires of the Florida–Miami rivalry by mocking his former team and fans during and after the game. Several weeks later, Berlin again showed his mettle in leading Miami to a 22–14 rain soaked victory at rival Florida State. However, Berlin struggled in a 31–7 November 1 loss to the Virginia Tech Hokies, as Miami's regular season winning streak was snapped at 39 games. Berlin and the Miami offense again struggled the next week as a hungover Hurricane squad lost 10–6 to Tennessee at home. Berlin, under intense criticism by the media and fans, was benched by head coach Larry Coker for Miami's next game against Syracuse. After Miami's offense, now quarterbacked by Derrick Crudup, again struggled in the 17–10 homecoming win against Syracuse, Coker switched back to Berlin. Miami would win the Big East Conference, defeat Florida State (for the second time that season) in the FedEx Orange Bowl, and finish the season at 11–2 and ranked #5 in both polls. Despite showing poise and strong leadership skills, Berlin's numbers for the 2003 season (2,419 yards, 12 touchdowns, and 17 interceptions) were unimpressive, and Coker opened up competition for the quarterback job in the spring.

==== 2004 season ====
Despite some fans clamoring for highly touted redshirt freshman Kyle Wright to be given the job, Berlin, now a senior, showed considerable progress during spring practice and won the starting job decisively.

Berlin played much better during the 2004 season and added yet another historic comeback to his résumé when he led Miami to a 41–38 win over Louisville in which Miami rallied from a 17-point deficit in the final 20 minutes of the game. The Hurricanes rose as high as #4 in the rankings before late season losses to ACC foes North Carolina, Clemson, and Virginia Tech knocked Miami out of national and conference championship contention. After an 8–3 regular season, Miami was invited to play in the Peach Bowl, where Berlin once again faced his former team, the Florida Gators. Again, Berlin enjoyed success against his former school as Miami won 27–10, finishing the season 9–3 and ranked #11 in both polls.

Berlin finished the season with impressive numbers, throwing for 2,961 yards and 25 touchdowns with six interceptions.

== Professional career ==
=== Miami Dolphins ===
Berlin went undrafted in the 2005 NFL draft, but was soon signed to a free agent contract by the Miami Dolphins. He served as a backup quarterback for the Dolphins during training camp, although he was not a member of the team's active regular season roster. During the offseason, Berlin was allocated by the Dolphins to NFL Europe to the Hamburg Sea Devils. He was cut by the team on August 30, 2006.

=== Dallas Cowboys ===
On April 25, 2007, he signed with the Dallas Cowboys to compete to be their third-string quarterback. He was later released by the team.

=== St. Louis Rams ===
On May 17, 2007, the St. Louis Rams signed Berlin to a contract. Berlin started his first NFL regular-season game on December 9, 2007. He was 17-for-27 for 153 yards, with an interception and two fumbles in the 19–10 loss to the Cincinnati Bengals.

In 2008, Berlin served as the Rams' inactive third quarterback for 15 games; he only saw action in the game against the Chicago Bears. He was released by the Rams on September 5, 2009.

=== Detroit Lions ===
Berlin was signed to the Detroit Lions practice squad on September 7, 2009. He was released by the team on September 23.

After his release from the Lions, Berlin did not sign with another NFL team.

== Family ==
Berlin is married and has three children.
