= Earnest Graham =

American football player (born 1980)

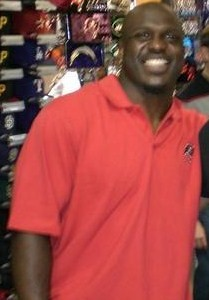
- Graham in 2009

No. 33, 34
- Position: Running back

Personal information
- Born: January 15, 1980 (age 46); Naples, Florida, U.S.
- Listed height: 5 ft 9 in (1.75 m)
- Listed weight: 225 lb (102 kg)

Career information
- High school: Mariner (FL)
- College: Florida
- NFL draft: 2003: undrafted

Career history
- Tampa Bay Buccaneers (2003)*; Cleveland Browns (2003)*; Tampa Bay Buccaneers (2003–2011)
- * Offseason or practice squad member only

Awards and highlights
- SEC All-Freshman Team (1999); Second-team All-SEC (2001)

Career NFL statistics
- Rushing attempts: 477
- Rushing yards: 2,047
- Receptions: 129
- Receiving yards: 904
- Total touchdowns: 16
- Stats at Pro Football Reference

Earnest Graham Jr. (born January 15, 1980) is an American former professional football player who was a running back for eight seasons in the National Football League (NFL). He played college football for the Florida Gators, and was signed by the Tampa Bay Buccaneers as an undrafted free agent in 2003. Graham became a favorite among Buccaneers fans, coaches, and fellow players for his hard work and team-first attitude.

After football, Graham became involved in various local business ventures. He also served as the head football coach at North Fort Myers High School from 2014 until 2018. In February 2019, Graham was announced as the new head coach and director of football operations at Evangelical Christian School in Fort Myers, Florida.

Graham's son, Myles, is currently a linebacker for the Florida Gators.

== Early life ==
Graham was born in Naples, Florida, in 1980. He attended Mariner High School in Cape Coral, Florida, He was a versatile athlete and lettered in high school football, baseball and basketball. Graham especially excelled as a football running back, and set county and state records for career rushing yards and touchdowns. He finished his high school career with 5,710 rushing yards and eighty-six touchdowns, including 2,159 yards and thirty touchdowns as a junior, and 1,858 yards and twenty-nine touchdowns as a senior—despite missing two games. Graham was named the state of Florida's "Mr. Football" in 1997, and was named a Parade magazine high school All-American.

In 1996, Earnest Graham was selected to play in The Rotary Club of Fort Myers South (http://rotarysouth.org/), All Star Game honoring high school players in Lee County, Fort Myers Florida

In 2007, nine years after he graduated from high school, the Florida High School Athletic Association (FHSAA) recognized Graham as one of the "100 Greatest Players of the First 100 Years" of Florida high school football.

== College career ==
Graham was a sought-after college recruit and chose to accept an athletic scholarship from the home-state University of Florida in Gainesville, Florida, where he played for the Gators teams under coach Steve Spurrier and coach Ron Zook from 1998 to 2002. Early in his first college season in 1998, Graham suffered a foot injury that required surgery and was granted a medical redshirt.

Graham started seven games for the Gators as a redshirt freshman in 1999 and ran for 654 yards and five touchdowns, earning him a spot on the Southeastern Conference All-Freshman team. Graham split time with fellow running back Robert Gillespie during the 2000 season, in which he rushed for 676 yards and eight touchdowns. Graham was slowed by injuries in 2001 (including a controversial knee injury suffered in the Florida State game), but still earned second-team All-SEC honors on the strength of 650 yards and nine touchdowns while again splitting time with Gillespie.

As a senior team captain in 2002, Graham started every game for the Gators and took advantage of his opportunity as the Gators' featured running back, rushing for 1,085 yards and eleven touchdowns, including a career-high 182 yards in the season opener versus the UAB Blazers.

At the conclusion of his career at Florida, Graham ranked among the best running backs in Gator history. Graham finished third in school history in rushing touchdowns (33), fifth in rushing yardage and attempts (3,065 yards on 603 carries), fifth in career 100-yard games (9), and ninth in all-purpose yards (3,468). Graham also averaged 135 yards in his three bowl games.

== Professional career ==
=== Tampa Bay Buccaneers (first stint) ===
Graham entered the NFL by signing as an undrafted free agent with the Tampa Bay Buccaneers on May 5, 2003. He was waived on August 22, 2003.

=== Cleveland Browns ===
Graham was signed to the practice squad of the Cleveland Browns on November 19, 2003. He was released on November 25, 2003.

=== Tampa Bay Buccaneers (second stint) ===
==== 2003–2006 ====
Graham was signed to the practice squad of the Buccaneers on December 3, 2003. He was released on December 9, 2003. He signed a reserve/future contract with the Buccaneers on December 29, 2003.

Graham was waived on September 5, 2004, and signed to the practice squad on September 7, 2004. He was finally promoted to the active roster on October 27, 2004.

Graham led the Bucs in rushing yards during the 2004, 2005, and 2006 preseasons, leading former coach Jon Gruden to dub him "Mr. August". However, he was not given the opportunity to carry the ball once the regular season began. Instead, Graham played extensively on special teams, leading the team in special teams tackles in 2005 and 2006.

==== 2007 season ====
Graham started the 2007 season playing predominantly on special teams once again. However, injuries to Bucs' running backs Carnell Williams, Mike Alstott, Michael Pittman allowed Graham to get significant playing at running back for the first time in his pro career. He scored the first two touchdowns of his career on September 23, 2007, in a 24–3 win against the St. Louis Rams. When starter Cadillac Williams seriously injured his knee in the following week's game against the Carolina Panthers, Graham became the Bucs' starting running back for the remainder of the season.

Graham took advantage of his opportunity, rushing for 898 yards and ten touchdowns in the thirteen games he played. In that span, he rushed for over 100 yards in a game three times and scored a touchdown in six consecutive contests. Graham became only the second running back in Buccaneers history to register back-to-back 100-yard rushing games, which he did against the Atlanta Falcons and the Arizona Cardinals. In nine of his ten starts, Graham either ran for 100 yards, scored a touchdown, averaged four yards a carry, or caught six or more passes.

==== 2008 season ====
After skipping voluntary off-season workouts in 2008 due to displeasure with his contract, Graham agreed to a three-year, $10.5 million extension on June 30, 2008. Although the deal contained no guaranteed money, Graham received a $1 million roster bonus for making the regular season roster.

During the 2008 season, Graham split carries with Warrick Dunn and broke off several long touchdown runs early in the season. Due to injuries to several of the Bucs' fullbacks, Graham volunteered to shift to that position and helped Dunn become an effective feature back for several weeks. During Week 11 of the 2008 season, Graham sustained an ankle injury on the first play against the Minnesota Vikings and was placed on injured reserve on November 19, ending his season.

==== 2009 season ====
For the 2009 season, Cadillac Williams finally returned from a series of serious injuries, putting Graham back in the role of a fullback and special teams player. His rushing attempts were limited, as he served primarily as a blocker rather than a ball carrier. He tore a ligament in his toe during the Bucs' week 16 game against the New Orleans Saints on December 27, and was placed on season-ending injured reserve the next day

==== 2010 season ====
Graham continued in his support role in 2010 as LeGarrette Blount became the Bucs' featured tailback, resulting in few carries for Graham and the team not resigning Williams after the season. Graham's season highlight came on December 5, when he threw a touchdown pass to tight end John Gilmore.

==== 2011 season ====
At the beginning of the 2011 season, Graham was again called on to be a fullback and special teams player. However, when Blount was injured during week 5, Graham was thrust back into the featured tailback role for an October 16 home game against the New Orleans Saints. He responded by rushing for 109 yards on 17 carries as the Bucs beat their division rivals 26–20. His one-game yardage total was more than he had gained in either of the previous two seasons in his role as a blocker

Graham again started at running back the following week when the Bucs played the Chicago Bears in London. However, he seriously injured his Achilles tendon during the first quarter and was placed on the injured reserve list two days later, ending his season and NFL career. He became a free agent following the 2011 season.

== NFL career statistics ==
Legend
**Bold**	Career high

=== Regular season ===
Year	Team	Games		Rushing					Receiving				
Year	Team	GP	GS	Att	Yds	Avg	Lng	TD	Rec	Yds	Avg	Lng	TD
2004	TAM	9	0	13	73	**5.6**	13	0	0	0	0.0	0	0
2005	TAM	**16**	0	28	83	3.0	16	0	0	0	0.0	0	0
2006	TAM	**16**	0	11	59	5.4	17	0	1	4	4.0	4	0
2007	TAM	15	**10**	**222**	**898**	4.0	28	**10**	**49**	**324**	6.6	21	0
2008	TAM	10	**10**	132	563	4.3	**68**	4	23	174	7.6	24	0
2009	TAM	13	6	14	66	4.7	17	0	14	109	7.8	16	0
2010	TAM	12	7	20	99	5.0	61	1	16	130	**8.1**	**46**	**1**
2011	TAM	7	2	37	206	**5.6**	34	0	26	163	6.3	19	0
		98	35	477	2,047	4.3	68	15	129	904	7.0	46	1

=== Playoffs ===
Year	Team	Games		Rushing					Receiving				
Year	Team	GP	GS	Att	Yds	Avg	Lng	TD	Rec	Yds	Avg	Lng	TD
2005	TAM	**1**	0	0	0	0.0	0	0	0	0	0.0	0	0
2007	TAM	**1**	**1**	**18**	**63**	**3.5**	**11**	**1**	**4**	**27**	**6.8**	**14**	0
		2	1	18	63	3.5	11	1	4	27	6.8	14	0

== Coaching career ==
In December 2013, Graham was named the head football coach at North Fort Myers High School in North Fort Myers, Florida, near his home town of Cape Coral. The Red Knights had a history of football success in the 1990s, but fell to 0–10 in the season prior to Graham's arrival. Graham led the team to records of 5-5, 5-5, and 6–3 in his first three season. In 2017, the Red Knights enjoyed their first unbeaten regular season since 1994 and qualified for the playoffs for the first time since 2006. They reached the regional semifinals and finished the year with a 9–1 record.

In April 2018, Graham resigned from his position at North Fort Myers, citing the need to spend more time with his family and take care of his health.

In February 2019, Graham was announced as the new head coach and director of football operations at Evangelical Christian School in Fort Myers, Florida.

Graham is currently the head coach at Santa Fe High School in Alachua, Florida.

== See also ==
- History of the Tampa Bay Buccaneers
