= 2002 Orange Bowl =

2002 FedEx Orange Bowl
- BCS Bowl Game; 68th Orange Bowl
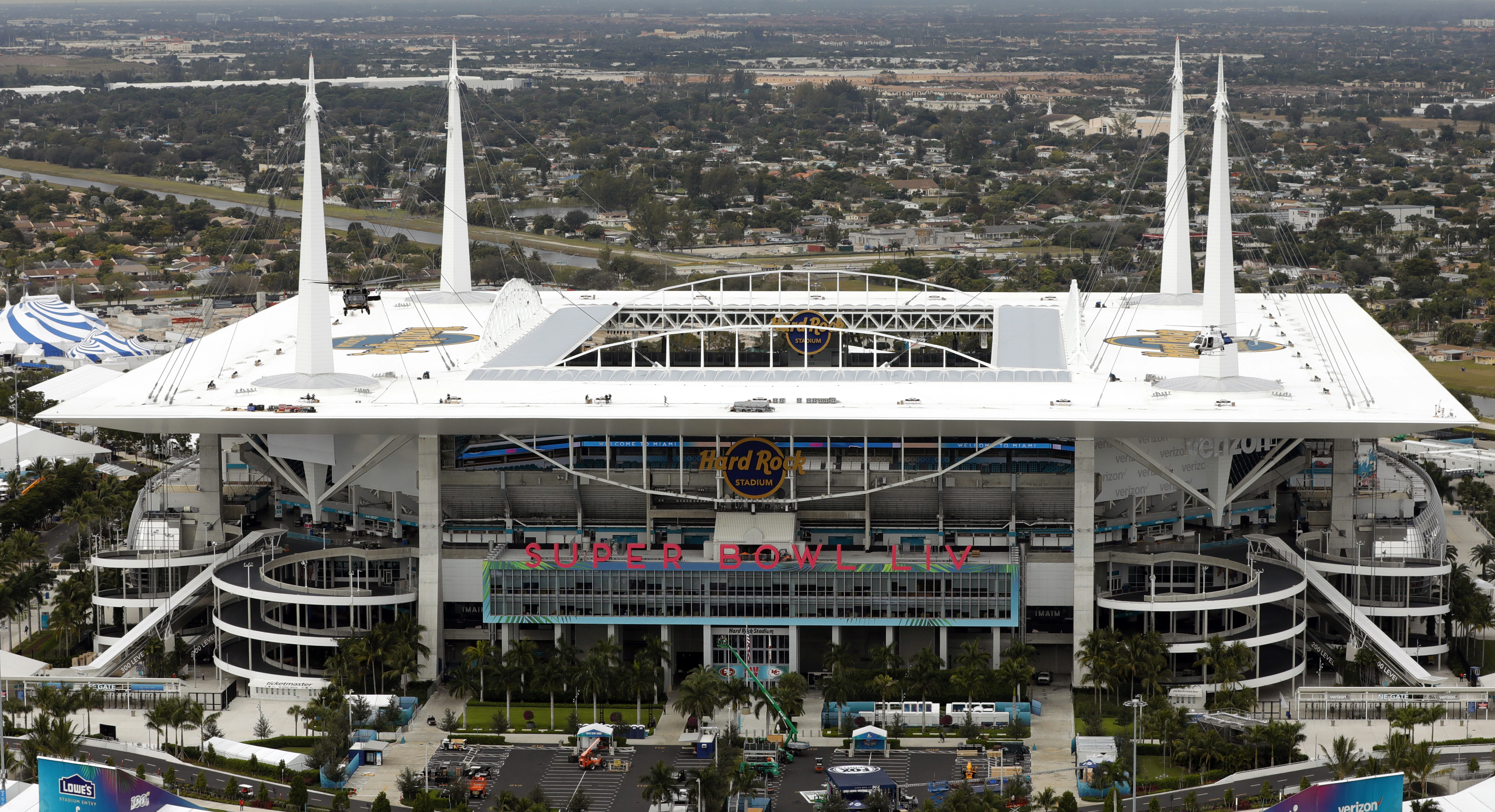
- Pro Player Stadium in Miami, Florida, hosted the Orange Bowl.
| Florida Gators | Maryland Terrapins |
| (9–2) | (10–1) |
| SEC | ACC |
| 56 | 23 |
| Head coach: Steve Spurrier | Head coach: Ralph Friedgen |
| AP / Coaches / BCS; 5 / 5 / 5 | AP / Coaches / BCS; 6 / 6 / 10 |
| | 1 | 2 | 3 | 4 | Total |
|---|---|---|---|---|---|
| Florida | 14 | 14 | 21 | 7 | 56 |
| Maryland | 7 | 3 | 0 | 13 | 23 |
- Date: January 2, 2002
- Season: 2001
- Stadium: Pro Player Stadium
- Location: Miami, Florida
- MVP: Florida WR Taylor Jacobs
- Favorite: Florida by 14.5 (58)
- Referee: James Sprenger (Pac-10)
- Attendance: 73,640

United States TV coverage
- Network: ABC
- Announcers: Brad Nessler and Bob Griese
- Nielsen ratings: 9.5

The 2002 FedEx Orange Bowl game was a post-season college football bowl game between the Florida Gators and the ACC champion Maryland Terrapins on January 2, 2002. Florida defeated Maryland 56–23. The game was part of the 2001–2002 Bowl Championship Series (BCS) of the 2001 NCAA Division I-A football season and was the concluding game of the season for both teams. The Orange Bowl was first played in 1935, and the 2002 game was the 68th edition of the Orange Bowl. The contest was televised in the United States on ABC.

This was Steve Spurrier's last game as coach of the Florida Gators as he resigned two days after the game.

== Teams ==
=== Florida Gators ===
Florida, ranked No. 1 entering the season, lost two SEC games by a total of 5 points and missed out on the SEC championship game. Despite those setbacks, the talented Gators entered this matchup with a 9–2 record (6–2 SEC) and a No. 5 ranking in both major polls and the BCS.

=== Maryland Terrapins ===
Under first-year head coach and Maryland alumnus Ralph Friedgen, the Terps surprised many by finishing 10–1 after the regular season. That included a 7–1 conference record which gave Maryland its first ACC title since 1985.

== Game summary ==
This potentially exciting matchup did not live up to the hype. Florida opened the scoring with a 1-yard TD run by Earnest Graham just over five minutes into the game. The opening quarter ended with some fireworks as each team scored a long touchdown in the final 12 seconds and the Gators led 14–7.

Maryland's Nick Novak kicked a 20-yard field goal with 12:20 remaining in the first half to make the score 14–10. The Terrapins inability to tie the game preceded an offensive onslaught by Florida that would last until the close of the third quarter. The Gators quick strike offense scored 35 consecutive points – including three TD passes by Heisman runner-up Rex Grossman and a second Graham TD run – in just over 15 minutes of game play to open a 49–10 advantage and put the game well out of reach.

Two touchdown runs by the Terps' Marc Riley sandwiched a fourth Grossman TD pass to close out the scoring, giving Steve Spurrier a 56–23 win in his final game as Florida's head coach.

2002 FedEx Orange Bowl

| Quarter | 1 | 2 | 3 | 4 | Total |
|---|---|---|---|---|---|
| No. 5 Florida | 14 | 14 | 21 | 7 | 56 |
| No. 6 Maryland | 7 | 3 | 0 | 13 | 23 |

at Pro Player Stadium • Miami Gardens, Florida

- Date: Wednesday, January 2, 2002
- Game time: 8:12 p.m. EST
- Game weather: Clear • Temperature: 74 °F (23 °C) • Wind: 7 mph (11 km/h) southeast
- Game attendance: 73,640
- Referee: James Sprenger (Pac-10)
- TV announcers (ABC): Brad Nessler (play-by-play), Bob Griese (analyst), and Lynn Swann (sideline)
- Box score

Scoring summary

| Quarter | Time | Drive | | | Team | Scoring information | Score | |
| Quarter | Time | Plays | Yards | TOP | Team | Scoring information | Florida | Maryland |
|---|---|---|---|---|---|---|---|---|
| 1 | 9:51 | 10 | 83 | 3:59 | Florida | Earnest Graham 1-yard touchdown run, Jeff Chandler kick good | 7 | 0 |
| 1 | 0:12 | 2 | 55 | 0:47 | Florida | Taylor Jacobs 46-yard touchdown reception from Brock Berlin, Jeff Chandler kick good | 14 | 0 |
| 1 | 0:00 | 1 | 64 | 0:12 | Maryland | Jafar Williams 64-yard touchdown reception from Shaun Hill, Nick Novak kick good | 14 | 7 |
| 2 | 12:20 | 4 | 1 | 0:45 | Maryland | 20-yard field goal by Nick Novak | 14 | 10 |
| 2 | 2:18 | 10 | 72 | 3:45 | Florida | Taylor Jacobs 15-yard touchdown reception from Rex Grossman, Jeff Chandler kick good | 21 | 10 |
| 2 | 0:03 | 6 | 64 | 1:21 | Florida | Jabar Gaffney 4-yard touchdown reception from Rex Grossman, Jeff Chandler kick good | 28 | 10 |
| 3 | 11:22 | 10 | 65 | 3:38 | Florida | Earnest Graham 6-yard touchdown run, Jeff Chandler kick good | 35 | 10 |
| 3 | 7:26 | 4 | 74 | 1:29 | Florida | Rob Gillespie 11-yard touchdown reception from Rex Grossman, Jeff Chandler kick good | 42 | 10 |
| 3 | 2:52 | 2 | 68 | 0:19 | Florida | Jabar Gaffney 33-yard touchdown reception from Rex Grossman, Jeff Chandler kick good | 49 | 10 |
| 4 | 11:56 | 15 | | 5:56 | Maryland | Marc Riley 1-yard touchdown run, Nick Novak kick good | 49 | 17 |
| 4 | 10:16 | 4 | 69 | 1:40 | Florida | Carlos Perez 10-yard touchdown reception from Rex Grossman, Jeff Chandler kick good | 56 | 17 |
| 4 | 5:10 | 14 | 80 | 5:06 | Maryland | Marc Riley 10-yard touchdown run, 2-point pass failed | 56 | 23 |
| "TOP" = time of possession. For other American football terms, see Glossary of American football. | | | | | | | 56 | 23 |

== Statistics ==
| Statistics | UF | MD |
|---|---|---|
| First downs | 30 | 19 |
| Plays–yards | 74–659 | 79–360 |
| Rushes–yards | 25–203 | 40–103 |
| Passing yards | 456 | 257 |
| Passing: comp–att–int | 33–49–2 | 23–39–1 |
| Turnovers | | |
| Time of possession | 28:26 | 31:34 |

| Team | Category | Player | Statistics |
|---|---|---|---|
| Florida | Passing | Rex Grossman | 20/28, 248 yds, 4 TD |
| Florida | Rushing | Earnest Graham | 16 car, 149 yds, 2 TD |
| Florida | Receiving | Taylor Jacobs | 10 rec, 170 yds, 2 TD |
| Maryland | Passing | Shaun Hill | 23/39, 257 yds, TD, INT |
| Maryland | Rushing | Shaun Hill | 11 car, 31 yds |
| Maryland | Receiving | Matt Murphy | 5 rec, 42 yds |
