= T-Mobile Park =

Baseball stadium in Seattle, Washington

- The Safe; Electric Factory; The House that Griffey Built

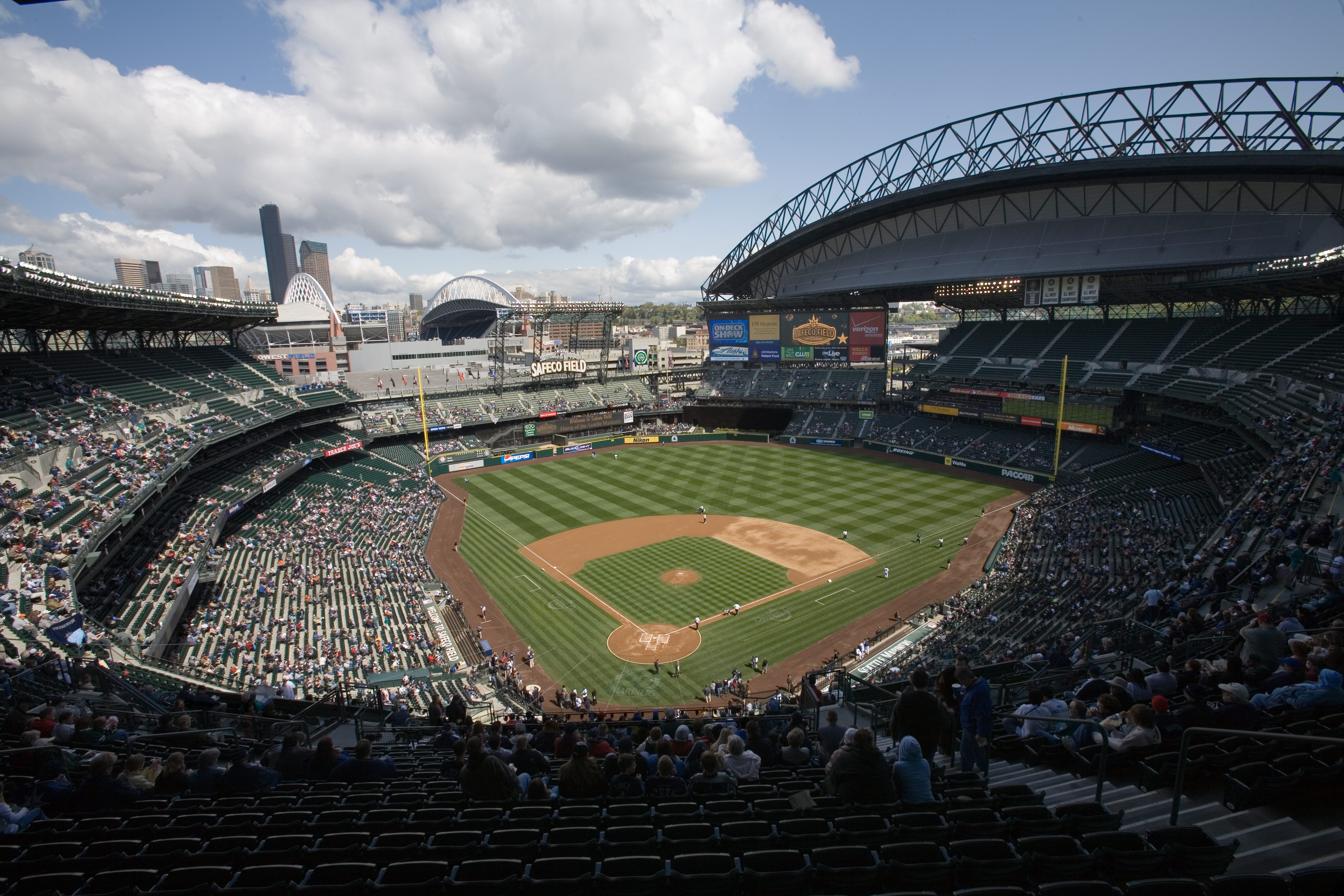
- T-Mobile Park (then Safeco Field) in 2007

- Location in Seattle Location in Washington State Location in the United States
- Former names: Safeco Field (1999–2018)
- Address: 1250 First Avenue South
- Location: Seattle, Washington, U.S.
- Coordinates: 47.591°N 122.333°W
- Owner: Washington State Major League Baseball Stadium Public Facilities District
- Operator: Washington State Major League Baseball Stadium Public Facilities District
- Capacity: Baseball: 47,368; Football: 30,144
- Roof: Retractable
- Surface: Kentucky Blue Grass / Perennial Ryegrass blend
- Record attendance: WrestleMania XIX 54,097
- Field size: Left Field – 331 ft (101 m); Left-Center – 378 ft (115 m); Center Field – 401 ft (122 m); Right-Center – 381 ft (116 m); Right Field – 326 ft (99 m); Backstop – 69 ft (21 m)
- Public transit: Stadium; International District/Chinatown; King Street Station

Construction
- Groundbreaking: March 8, 1997
- Opened: July 15, 1999
- Cost: $517 million ($1 billion in 2025 dollars)
- Architects: NBBJ; 360 Architecture
- Project manager: The Vosk Group LLP
- Structural engineer: Magnusson Klemencic Associates
- Services engineer: Flack + Kurtz Inc.
- General contractor: Hunt-Kiewit
- Main contractors: Stadium: Huber, Hunt and Nichols Inc, Kiewit Construction Company, Skilling Ward Magnusson Barkshire; Roof: The Erection Company Inc.

Tenants
- Seattle Mariners (MLB) 1999–present Seattle Bowl (NCAA) 2001

Website
- mlb.com/mariners/ballpark

T-Mobile Park is a retractable roof ballpark in Seattle, Washington, United States. It is the home stadium of the Seattle Mariners of Major League Baseball and has a seating capacity of 47,368. It is in Seattle's SoDo neighborhood, near the western terminus of Interstate 90 and is owned and operated by the Washington State Major League Baseball Stadium Public Facilities District. The first game at the stadium was played on July 15, 1999.

During the 1990s, the suitability of the Mariners' original stadium, the Kingdome, as an MLB facility came under question, and the team's ownership group threatened to relocate the team. In September 1995, King County voters defeated a ballot measure to secure public funding for a new baseball stadium. Shortly thereafter, the Mariners' first appearance in the MLB postseason and their victory in the 1995 American League Division Series (ALDS) revived public desire to keep the team in Seattle. As a result, the Washington State Legislature approved an alternate means of funding for the stadium with public money. The site, just south of the Kingdome, was selected in September 1996 and construction began in March 1997. The bonds issued to finance the stadium were retired on October 1, 2011, five years earlier than anticipated.

T-Mobile Park is also used for amateur baseball events, including the Washington Interscholastic Activities Association high school state championships and one Washington Huskies baseball game per season. Major non-baseball events that have been held at T-Mobile Park include the 2001 Seattle Bowl, WrestleMania XIX in 2003, which attracted the stadium's record attendance of 54,097, and the 2024 NHL Winter Classic.

The stadium was originally named Safeco Field under a 20-year naming-rights deal with Seattle-based Safeco Insurance. T-Mobile acquired the naming rights on December 19, 2018, and the name change took effect on January 1, 2019.

== Location and transportation ==
T-Mobile Park is in the SoDo district of downtown Seattle, bounded by Dave Niehaus Way (a block of 1st Avenue S.) to the west, Edgar Martínez Drive (formerly S. Atlantic Street) to the south, Royal Brougham Way to the north, and BNSF railroad tracks to the east.

Parking is available at the stadium's parking garage across Edgar Martínez Drive, the Lumen Field garage to the North, and other privately operated lots in the area. Sounder commuter rail serves nearby King Street Station. T-Mobile Park is also served by the 1 Line of Sound Transit's Link light rail system and local King County Metro and Sound Transit Express bus routes at the nearby Stadium station.

Events at T-Mobile Park are scheduled to avoid conflicts with Lumen Field, which is directly north of the stadium. The Mariners have priority for schedule slots per an agreement reached with the Seattle Seahawks, who play at Lumen Field.

A dedicated ride-hailing lot opened in June 2023 along 3rd Avenue; it cost $2.8 million to construct and opened ahead of the 2023 MLB All-Star Game.

== History ==
On March 30, 1994, county executive Gary Locke appointed a task force to assess the need for a new baseball stadium to replace the rapidly deteriorating Kingdome. Many feared that the Mariners would leave Seattle if a new stadium was not built. In January 1995, the 28-member task force recommended to the King County Council that the public should be involved in financing the stadium. The task force concluded that a sales tax increase of 0.1% (to 8.3%) would be sufficient to fund the stadium. King County held a special election on September 19, asking the public for this sales tax increase; the measure led early, but was narrowly defeated by one-fifth of one percent.

On October 14, a special session of the state legislature authorized a different funding package for a new stadium that included a food and beverage tax in King County restaurants and bars, car rental surcharge in King County, a ballpark admissions tax, a credit against the state sales tax, and sale of a special stadium license plate. Nine days later, the King County Council approved the funding package, and established the Washington State Major League Baseball Stadium Public Facilities District to own the ballpark and oversee design and construction. Taxpayer suits opposing the legislative actions and the taxes failed in the courts.

Initial concepts for the new stadium, developed under the working name of New Century Park, were unveiled by architecture firm HOK in March 1995. The design included a retractable roof split into four sections and a seating capacity of 45,000 seats on four levels. On September 9, 1996, the site was selected for the new stadium, just south of the Kingdome. In late fall, several members of the King County Council wrote a letter to the Seattle Mariners, requesting a postponement of the projected $384.5-million stadium project.

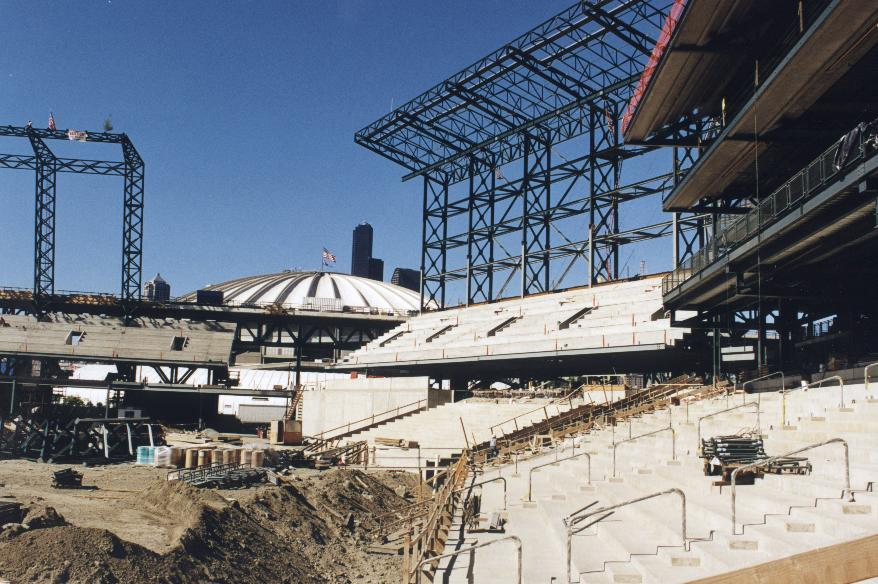
T-Mobile Park under construction in 1998. The Kingdome is visible in the background.

Construction officially began in 1997, with a groundbreaking ceremony on March 8 featuring Mariners star Ken Griffey Jr. The construction, overseen by chief financial officer (and former team president and minority owner) Kevin Mather, continued through the beginning of the 1999 season. Its first game was on July 15, immediately after the All-Star break; the Mariners lost 3–2 to the San Diego Padres with 44,607 in attendance. Longtime team broadcaster Dave Niehaus threw out the ceremonial first pitch at the game to Tom Foley, the former Speaker of the United States House of Representatives.

The naming rights were sold in June 1998 to Seattle-based Safeco Insurance, which paid $40 million for a 20-year deal. The 2018 season was the last played under this name, and the Safeco signage was removed from the ballpark beginning that November. The naming rights were awarded to T-Mobile, whose U.S. headquarters are based in nearby Bellevue on December 19, which paid $87.5 million for an agreement that will last 25 years, and the name change officially took effect on January 1, 2019.

Ken Griffey Jr. returned to Safeco Field in 2007 with the Cincinnati Reds (where he had been traded after the 1999 season) to a hero's welcome. In commemoration of Griffey's achievements with the team, the Mariners unveiled a new poster that declared Safeco Field "The House That Griffey Built."

The Mariners moved the fences at Safeco Field closer to home plate before the 2013 season "to create an environment that is fair for both hitters and pitchers," according to general manager Jack Zduriencik. Safeco Field had been considered one of the most pitcher-friendly ballparks in the majors since it opened. The center field scoreboard and ad panels were replaced with an 11,435 square foot (1,062.3 m^{2}) board during renovations, becoming the largest among all stadium scoreboards in the major leagues at the time.

After the 2017 season, the field surface, in place since the stadium opened in 1999, underwent its first full replacement. The infield and foul territory were redone in 2012, but the outfield had not been replaced before the resodding.

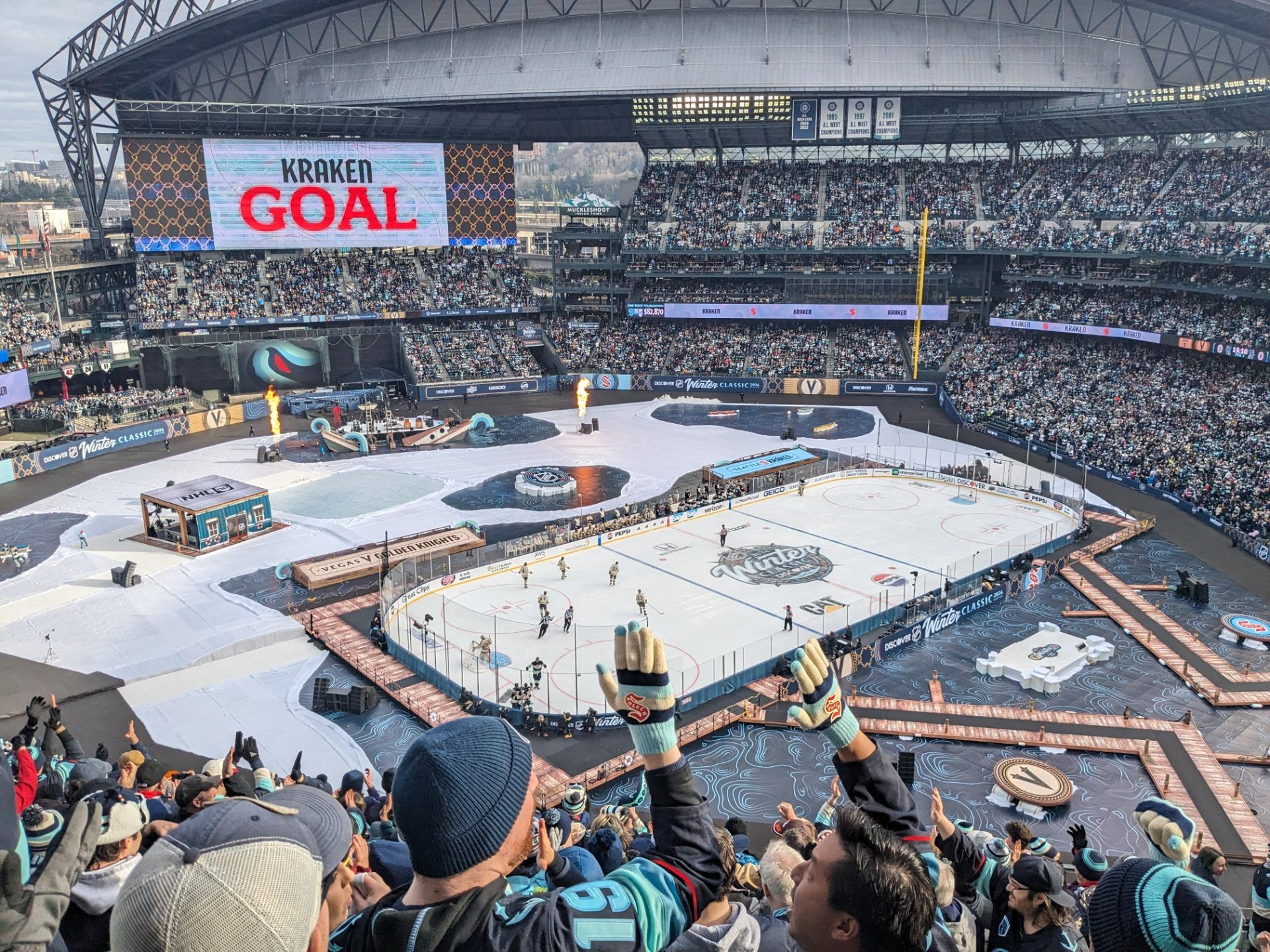
The 2024 NHL Winter Classic between the Seattle Kraken and Vegas Golden Knights at T-Mobile Park

On January 1, 2024, the National Hockey League (NHL) hosted the 2024 NHL Winter Classic, where the Seattle Kraken won over the Vegas Golden Knights 3–0.

== Features ==
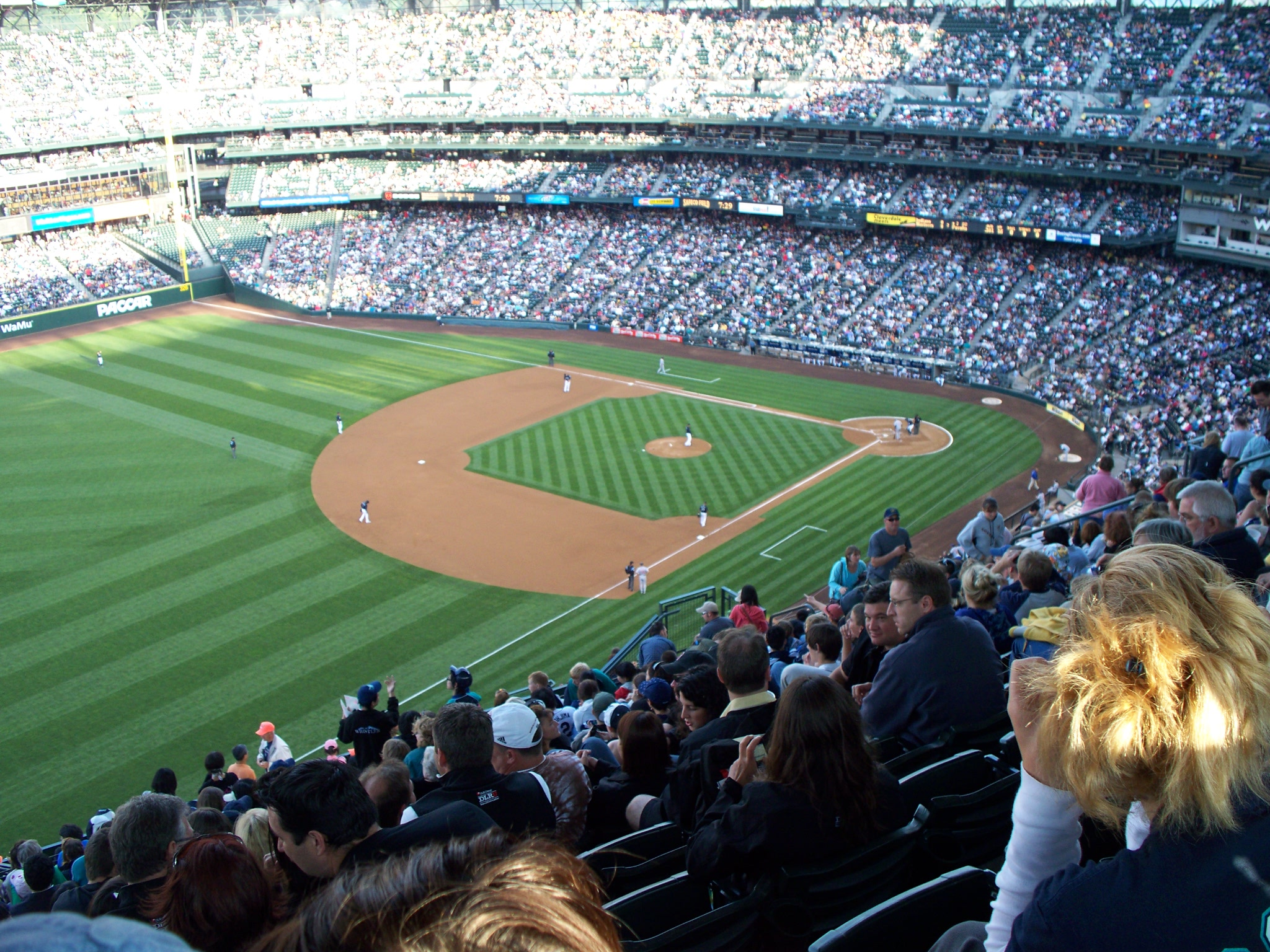
View from high left field corner in July 2008

T-Mobile Park covers an area of 19.59 acres (7.93 ha) and incorporates 1,172,127 square feet (108,894.2 m^{2}) of gross interior space. The playing field uses a mix of Kentucky bluegrass and overseeded perennial ryegrass that is supplied by a sod farm in Moses Lake, Washington. During colder months, the grass is kept warm through a series of underground heaters that stimulate growth. Artificial lights are used for areas with less sunlight, such as the right field and first base sideline. During special events on the field, such as concerts, the grass is covered by portable flooring tiles; damaged sections are then replaced using new deliveries from the sod farm or patches grown behind the center field wall.

There previously was technology that allowed spectators to monitor special game-time features with Nintendo DS receivers.

=== Layout ===
There are five main levels to the stadium: Field (or Street), Main Concourse (100 level), Club Level (200 level), Suite Level, and the View Level (300 level). The Main Level has 20,521 seats—the most of any section—and encompasses most of the lower bowl. There are 4,123 seats in the Club Level, 2,050 seats in the Suite Level, and 15,902 seats in the View Level. Two bleacher sections are above left field and below the center field scoreboard, with 3,666 seats. The field sits approximately at street level, requiring visitors to ascend stairs, escalators, or elevators to access the main concourse from the entrances, with the exception of the Right Field Entry, which opens onto the main concourse.

T-Mobile Park has several themed terrace areas, including the T-Mobile 'Pen behind left and center field; and the Trident Deck on the View Level. A short boardwalk runs along 1st Avenue on the View Level with views of Puget Sound and the city skyline. The press box, named the Dave Niehaus Broadcast Center, is on the Club Level and sub-level behind home plate. It was named for longtime Mariners broadcaster Dave Niehaus; after his death, his headset and microphone were placed by his empty seat in the Broadcast Center as a tribute. The stadium has an attached parking garage with 1,800 stalls that is supplemented by unofficial lots in the area as well as the adjacent Lumen Field garage.

=== Seating capacity ===
Years	Capacity
1999–2002	46,621
2003	47,772
2004–2008	47,447
2009–2011	47,878
2012	47,860
2013–2014	47,476
2015	47,574
2016–2017	47,943
2018	47,715
2019	47,929
2020	47,500
2021	47,480
2022	47,378
2023	47,349
2024	47,376
2025–2026	47,368

=== Food service ===
T-Mobile Park offers greater food and beverage selection than typical ballparks. It includes concession stands operated by chain as well as local restaurants, such as Ivar's, Kidd Valley, and Salt & Straw. Patrons could previously order food with a Nintendo DS app called Nintendo Fan Network. The ballpark debuted "Walk-Off Market", the first cashierless store in an MLB stadium, in May 2022 using technology supplied by Amazon. Three additional locations the following season and include grab-and-go food and beverages.

=== Retractable roof ===
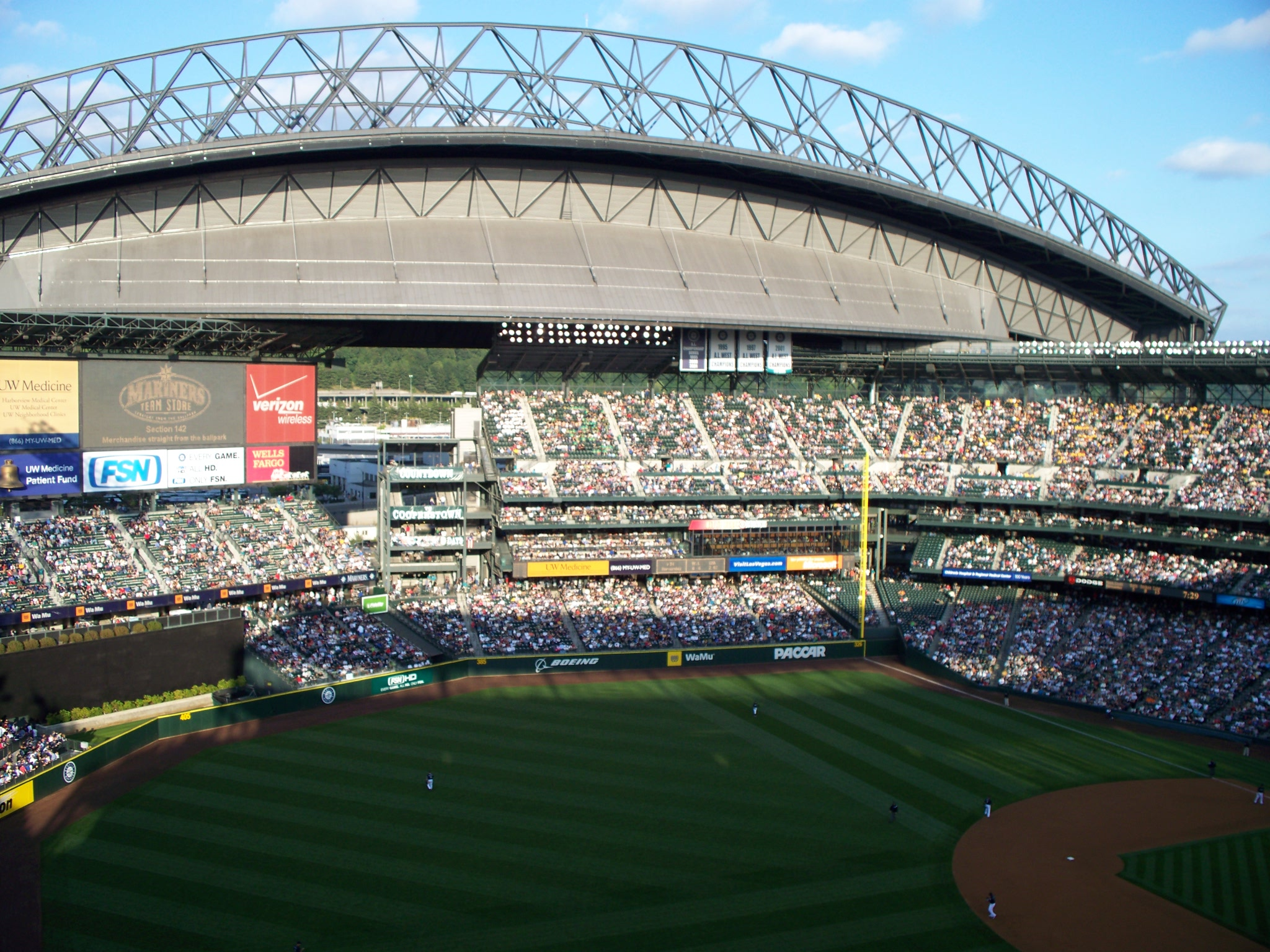
Retractable roof open, July 2008

In the open position, the roof rests over the BNSF Railway tracks that bound the stadium to the east, with part of it hanging over the stands in right field. This has the effect of echoing the whistles from passing trains into the stadium. Train horns were often heard inside the stadium throughout the 2000s, but abated significantly when an overpass was built for Royal Brougham Way, the street that bounds the stadium to the north which previously crossed the tracks. Unlike other stadiums with retractable roofs, the roof at T-Mobile Park does not fully enclose the ballpark; this allows the wind and temperatures to still impact the game with the roof closed.

The roof covers approximately 9 acres (3.6 ha) and weighs 22 million pounds (10,000,000 kg). It moves with 128 wheels that move along rails on the north and south side of the ballpark. The top of the roof is 269 feet (82 m) above field level, while the bottom is 217 feet (66 m) high. The roof takes 10 to 20 minutes to open and is moved 300 to 500 times per year, mostly to manage the stadium's grass. The Mariners play an average of 17 to 18 games per season with the roof closed, the least among MLB ballparks with retractable roofs. From 1999 to 2024, the roof had been used for 435 games—22 percent of those played at the stadium—with a maximum of 25 games during the 2010 season. The Mariners had a 843–737 record in games with the roof open, 145–133 with it closed, and 81–76 in games where the roof moves.

=== Scoreboards ===
T-Mobile Park features a manual scoreboard, the second-largest HD video display scoreboard in MLB, a color LED out-of-town scoreboard, and LED ribbon boards along the terraces. The main scoreboard, which replaced the original monochrome scoreboard and separate video screen above the center field bleachers before the 2013 season, is more than 11,000 square feet (1,000 m^{2}) in area. The board can be used either all at once, such as for live action or video replays, or split into sections for displaying information such as statistics and advertisements.

=== Mariners Hall of Fame ===
The Baseball Museum of the Pacific Northwest on the main concourse includes the Mariners Hall of Fame, which features bronze plaques of the 11 inducted members: Alvin Davis (1997), broadcaster Dave Niehaus (2000), Jay Buhner (2004), Edgar Martínez (2007), Randy Johnson (2012), Dan Wilson (2012), Ken Griffey Jr. (2013), Lou Pinella (2014), Jamie Moyer (2015), Ichiro Suzuki (2022), and Félix Hernández (2023). The plaques describe their contributions to the franchise, as well as murals and television screens showing highlights of their careers with the Mariners.

=== The 'Pen ===
The 'Pen, known for sponsorship purposes as "The T-Mobile 'Pen", is a standing-room only area adjacent to the bullpens, where spectators can watch relief pitchers warm up before entering the game.

When the stadium opened during the 1999 season, the area was called the "Bullpen Market". In 2013, the Mariners' vice president of ballpark operations described the Bullpen Market as a dark and unwelcoming place that needed a remodel to be more attractive to fans.

Prior to the 2011 season, the Mariners brought in three celebrity chefs to introduce special concession stands with exclusive food options. In the first season under its new branding, per-capita fan spending in The 'Pen increased by 87% from the previous season. In 2013, Edgar's Cantina, named for Hall of Fame Mariners player Edgar Martínez, opened. Sports Business Journal called The 'Pen "one of the liveliest social scenes in Major League Baseball" in 2013, when fan spending in The 'Pen had risen 42% year over year, which a team spokeswoman credited primarily to Edgar's Cantina.

Local Mexican restaurant Poquitos opened a stand in The 'Pen during the 2017 season, and quickly gained national fame for selling chapulines, toasted grasshoppers, at every game. Poquitos sold over 900 orders of chapulines at the first three home games, at $4.00 for a 4-US-fluid-ounce (120 ml) cup.

In 2019, the Mariners opened The 'Pen two and a half hours before the first pitch of Mariners home games, offering happy hour specials to encourage fans to arrive early. As many as 3,000 fans come to The 'Pen during each game.

The 'Pen attracts large and often rowdy crowds due to its food and drink options. On April 13, 2013, a man was injured and required reconstructive surgery after a fight broke out over a table in The 'Pen. Two men turned themselves in, one of whom faced a felony assault charge. A team spokesperson said that the Mariners assign more uniformed police officers, private security guards, and alcohol enforcement officials to The 'Pen during special events, such as College Night.

== Artwork ==
T-Mobile Park and its adjoining parking garage feature extensive public art displays, including:

- "The Tempest", a chandelier made of 1,000 resin baseball bats above the home plate entry. A companion 27-foot diameter compass rose mosaic at the home plate rotunda captures a number of elements in the history of baseball. It was created by Linda Beaumont, Stuart Keeler, and Michael Machnic.
- "Quilts" depicting each MLB team logo, made from recycled metal including license plates from the respective teams' states (or the province of Ontario in the case of the Toronto Blue Jays, or the District of Columbia in the case of the Washington Nationals). The collection also includes references to the history of baseball in the Pacific Northwest.
- Stainless steel cutouts of players in various poses while catching, batting, fielding, and pitching, integrated into the fences at the stadium's four main gates.
- Six Pitches, a series of metal sculptures depicting hands gripping baseballs for various types of pitches along the west facade of the garage.
- A 9-foot-tall (2.7 m) bronze baseball glove, The Mitt by Gerard Tsutakawa.
- The Defining Moment, a mural by Thom Ross depicting Edgar Martínez's famed "The Double".
- Children's Hospital Wishing Well, which features a bronze statue of a child in batting position, and includes a geyser effect that was used at the end of the national anthem.
- Porcelain enamel on steel flag-mounted banner-panels depicting "Positions of the Field".

=== Statues ===
T-Mobile Park has four bronze statues that depict significant Mariners players and staff; they were commissioned by the team and created by sculptor Lou Cella. The first, of Mariners broadcaster Dave Niehaus (1935–2010), was unveiled on September 16, 2011, and installed in the main concourse near centerfield. It depicts Niehaus at his desk, where he called 5,284 Mariners games over 34 seasons from 1977 to 2010, with a scorebook filled with details from Game 5 of the 1995 American League Division Series, when Edgar Martínez hit "The Double", as written by Niehaus. An empty seat next to the statue allows fans to pose for photographs.

The first statue outside of the ballpark, depicting outfielder Ken Griffey Jr., was unveiled in April 2017 outside the Home Plate Entrance. After the 2017 season, the bat was broken off in an attempt to steal it, but a bystander from the office building across the street ran down the perpetrator and recovered the bat, which was subsequently reattached. A bronze statue of Edgar Martínez was installed in August 2021 on the south side of the stadium on the street that is named for the player. A statue of Ichiro Suzuki was unveiled on April 10, 2026, adjacent to the Griffey and Martínez statues. It depicts Suzuki, dressed in his rookie uniform from the 2001 season, in his signature batting stance with his upright bat in his right hand; the bat was broken during the unveiling ceremony. On September 3, 2026, the "Mariners Legacy Plaza" was unveiled, commemorating their historic 116-win 2001 season. The centerpiece of the plaza is a statue based on a photograph of Mike Cameron and Mark McLemore raising the American flag after winning the AL West title nearly twenty years prior.

== Notable events ==
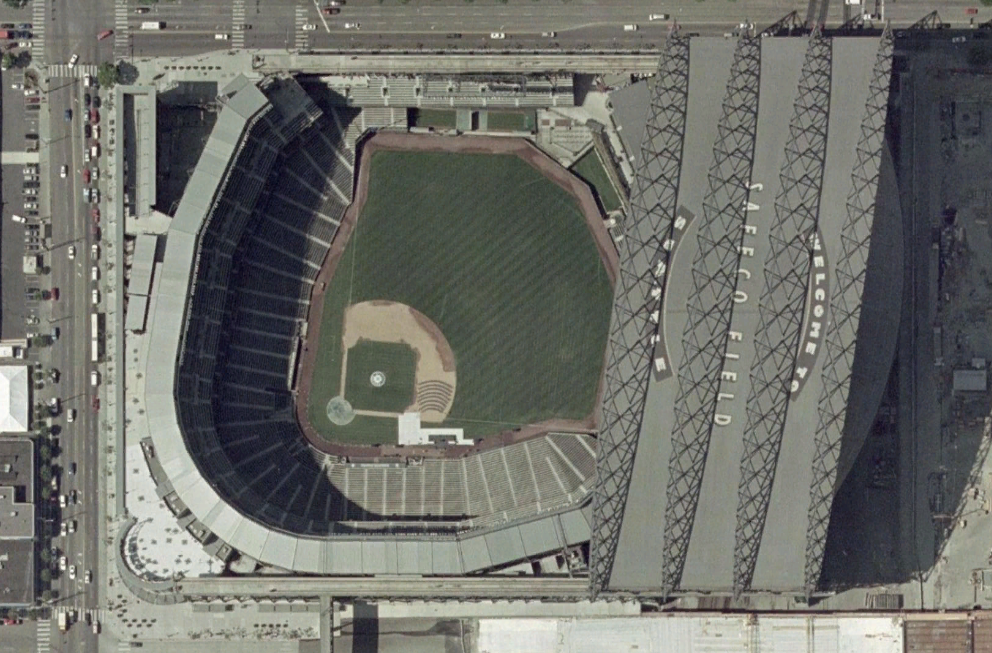
Satellite photo of T-Mobile Park

=== Major League Baseball ===
On April 21, 2012, Chicago White Sox pitcher Philip Humber pitched the 21st perfect game in Major League Baseball (MLB) history against the Mariners in his second start of the season. It was the third perfect game in White Sox history joining Charlie Robertson in 1922 and Mark Buehrle in 2009.

Nearly 4 months later on August 15, Mariners pitcher Félix Hernández pitched the 23rd perfect game in MLB history and the first perfect game in Mariners history. This marked the second perfect game and third no-hitter at the park, all of which occurred in 2012.

The stadium has hosted the MLB All-Star Game twice: in 2001 as Safeco Field and 2023 as T-Mobile Park. The 2001 edition was won by the American League—featuring eight players from the Mariners—in front of 47,364 spectators. The 2023 edition was won by the National League with 47,159 in attendance. The 2023 event used nearby Lumen Field for several events, including a fan festival and the MLB player draft.

=== Minor league baseball ===
The stadium has been temporarily used by local minor league teams for playoff games when their normal venues were unavailable. The Tacoma Rainiers played their 2010 Pacific Coast League playoff semifinal games at Safeco Field while Cheney Stadium underwent off-season renovations. The Rainiers won their series and advanced to the PCL Championship, which was played entirely on the road due to Safeco Field being unavailable.

The Everett AquaSox of the Class A Northwest League played one game in the 2016 playoffs against the Spokane Indians at Safeco Field. The move was arranged after a rainstorm rendered the outfield at Everett Memorial Stadium unusable for several days.

=== College baseball ===
On May 4, 2007, a Pacific-10 Conference baseball attendance record was set when the Washington Huskies hosted the defending national champion Oregon State Beavers in front of 10,421 spectators. Washington won the game, 6–2.

=== College football ===
The stadium hosted the 2001 Seattle Bowl, the first edition of the short-lived Seattle Bowl college football bowl game, on December 27, 2001. Georgia Tech defeated 11th-ranked Stanford, 24–14, before 30,144 fans.

=== Soccer ===
The stadium hosted several soccer matches before the opening of Lumen Field, which was designed for soccer. To prepare for soccer matches, the field has to be sodded to cover and replace the dirt infield.

On March 2, 2002, the United States men's national soccer team played Honduras in a friendly match, winning 4–0 in front of a then-record crowd of 38,534. The stadium hosted four matches during the 2002 CONCACAF Women's Gold Cup in November, including two matches featuring the U.S. women's national soccer team, as part of qualification for the 2003 FIFA Women's World Cup. The first U.S. match, against Panama, had an attendance of 21,522; the second match, against Costa Rica, was attended by 10,079 fans.

Seattle Sounders FC, a Major League Soccer team that plays at adjacent Lumen Field, once drafted plans to play a 2018 CONCACAF Champions League match at Safeco Field due to a potential scheduling conflict.

Date	Winning Team	Result	Losing Team	Tournament	Spectators
March 2, 2002	United States	4–0	Honduras	International Friendly	38,534
November 2, 2002	Mexico	2–0	Trinidad and Tobago	2002 CONCACAF Women's Gold Cup First Round	—
November 2, 2002	United States	9–0	Panama	2002 CONCACAF Women's Gold Cup First Round	21,522
November 6, 2002	Canada	2–0	Mexico	2002 CONCACAF Women's Gold Cup Semifinal	—
November 6, 2002	United States	7–0	Costa Rica	2002 CONCACAF Women's Gold Cup Semifinal	10,079

=== Wrestling ===
On March 30, 2003, the stadium hosted WrestleMania XIX, which set an all-time record attendance for the facility of 54,097.

=== Ice hockey ===
The 2024 NHL Winter Classic on January 1 was held at T-Mobile Park and was contested by the Seattle Kraken and the Vegas Golden Knights. The Kraken won 3–0 in front of 47,313 spectators.

=== Concerts ===
The first public concert at the stadium was for Paul McCartney on the 2013 Out There Tour. It was organized by Live Nation, who sought to open then-Safeco Field to more musical performances, and required a full week to prepare the stage in center field.

Date	Artist	Opening act(s)	Tour / Concert name	Attendance	Revenue	Notes
September 16, 2008	The Beach Boys	—	—	—	—	Semi-private performance during the Microsoft annual company meeting with limited public tickets.
July 19, 2013	Paul McCartney	—	Out There Tour	45,229 / 45,229	$4,525,200	The stadium's first public concert, it also featured former Nirvana members on a performance of the song "Cut Me Some Slack".
July 30, 2014	Beyoncé; Jay-Z	—	On the Run Tour	40,615 / 40,615	$4,339,642	
May 20, 2016	Billy Joel	Gavin DeGraw	Billy Joel in Concert	36,582 / 36,582	$4,045,000	
August 19, 2017	Tom Petty & The Heartbreakers	The Lumineers	40th Anniversary Tour	42,199 / 46,050	$3,665,292	
August 8, 2018	Pearl Jam	—	Pearl Jam 2018 Tour	88,142 / 91,918	$7,829,518	This was the first time in five years since the band last played in their hometown.
August 10, 2018	Pearl Jam	—	Pearl Jam 2018 Tour	88,142 / 91,918	$7,829,518	This was the first time in five years since the band last played in their hometown.
August 31, 2018	Zac Brown Band	OneRepublic	Down the Rabbit Hole Live	TBA	TBA	
September 1, 2018	Foo Fighters	Giants in the Trees and The Joy Formidable	Concrete and Gold Tour	37,825 / 49,131	$2,913,484	The surviving members of Nirvana reunited for a few songs.
October 19, 2019	The Who	Liam Gallagher	Moving On! Tour	—	—	
September 6, 2021	Green Day; Fall Out Boy; Weezer	The Interrupters	Hella Mega Tour	37,709 / 37,709	$4,000,109	Originally scheduled for July 25, 2020, and later, July 17, 2021.
August 3, 2022	Red Hot Chili Peppers	The Strokes; Thundercat	2022 Global Stadium Tour	41,706 / 41,706	$5,489,712	
August 18, 2024	Foo Fighters	Pretenders; Alex G	Everything or Nothing at All Tour			
September 4, 2024	Def Leppard; Journey	Cheap Trick	The Summer Stadium Tour			
September 23, 2024	Green Day; The Smashing Pumpkins	Rancid; The Linda Lindas	The Saviors Tour			
May 24, 2025	Stray Kids		Dominate World Tour			
June 26, 2025	Post Malone; Jelly Roll		Big Ass Stadium Tour	41,648 / 41,648	$7,310,461	
July 11, 2025	My Chemical Romance	Violent Femmes	Long Live The Black Parade			
August 30, 2026	Noah Kahan	Gigi Perez Annabelle Dinda	The Great Divide Tour	86,000 / 86,000		First solo act to headline two consecutive dates.
August 31, 2026	Noah Kahan	Gigi Perez Annabelle Dinda	The Great Divide Tour	86,000 / 86,000		First solo act to headline two consecutive dates.

=== Other ===
- The stadium was the home to the Microsoft annual employee meeting until 2012, attracting over 20,000 employees.
- Bernie Sanders held a rally for his 2016 presidential campaign on March 25.
- The stadium hosted Nitro Circus Live on September 16, 2017.
- On September 15, 2018, Russell M. Nelson, then President of the Church of Jesus Christ of Latter-day Saints, along with his wife, Wendy Watson Nelson, and Second Counselor Henry B. Eyring, held a devotional that was attended by 49,089 church members, friends, and members of the community.
- Several local high schools and universities have held graduation ceremonies at the stadium. Issaquah High School's class of 2000 was the first to graduate at the stadium.

== See also ==
- Rick "The Peanut Man" Kaminski

Events and tenants
Preceded by The Kingdome	Home of the Seattle Mariners; 1999 – present	Succeeded by current
Preceded by Turner Field; Dodger Stadium	Host of the All-Star Game; 2001; 2023	Succeeded by Miller Park; Globe Life Field
Preceded by SkyDome	Host of WrestleMania; 2003 (XIX)	Succeeded by Madison Square Garden
Preceded by Fenway Park	Host of the NHL Winter Classic; 2024	Succeeded by Wrigley Field
