= Family Home Evening =

Practice in the Church of Jesus Christ of Latter-day Saints

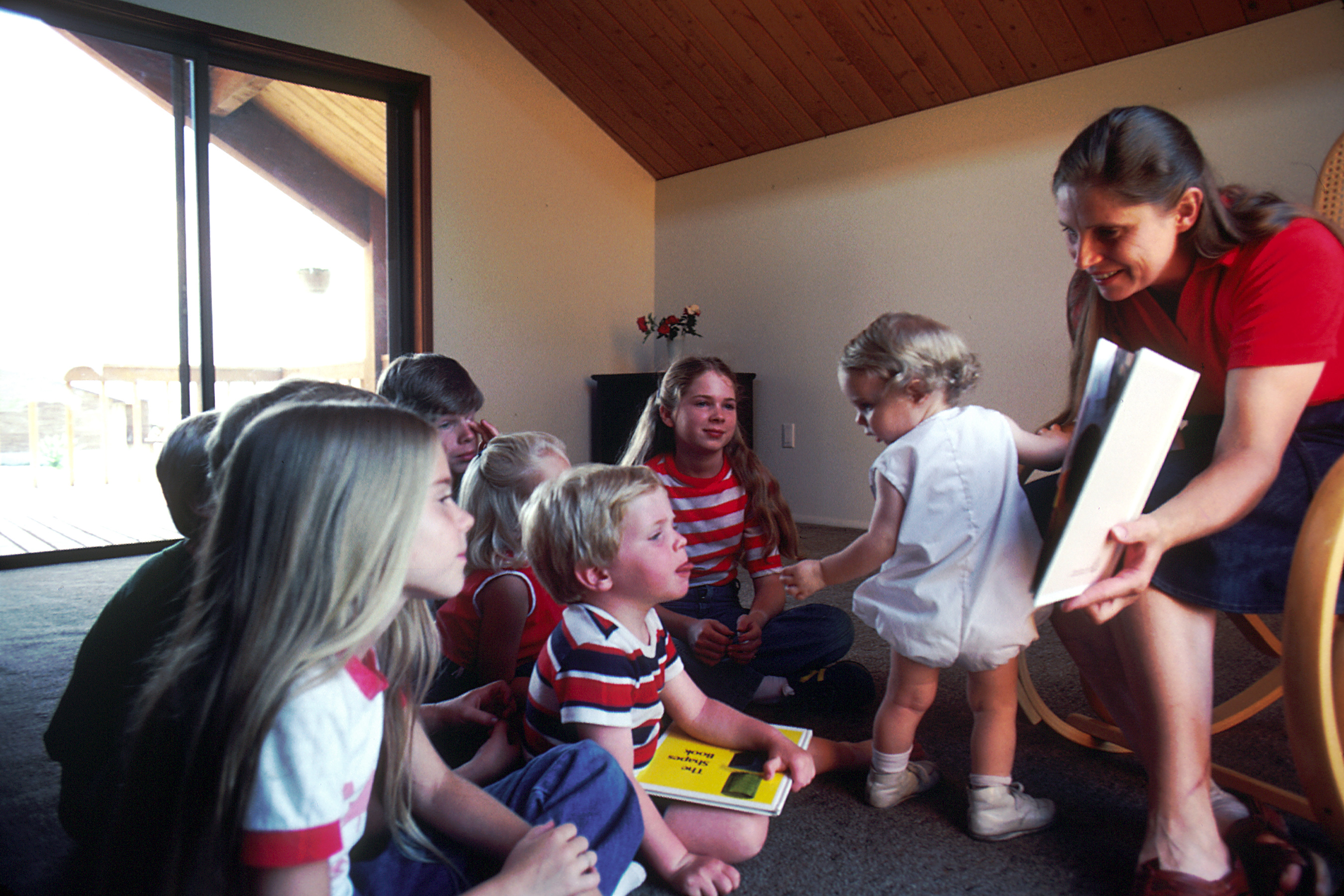
LDS Family Home Evening

Family Home Evening (FHE), Home Evening, or Family Night, in the context of the Church of Jesus Christ of Latter-day Saints (LDS Church), refers to one evening per week, usually Monday or Sunday, that families are encouraged to spend together in religious instruction, prayer, and other activities. According to the LDS Church, the purpose of FHE is to help families strengthen bonds of love with one another, as well as provide an atmosphere where parents can teach their children principles of the gospel.

For many Latter-day Saint families, Family Home Evening includes a game or fun activity, treats, and a short lesson. The responsibilities for each are often rotated among family members, so that even the youngest may be assisted in presenting a short lesson or devotional on a given topic. Parents often use this night as an opportunity to teach their children how to prepare talks and lessons, as well as how to conduct meetings. Family business for the week may be addressed and the family schedule also reviewed.

== History ==
In a letter dated April 27, 1915, and distributed to local leaders of the LDS Church, the church's First Presidency encouraged a church-wide practice of a regular "Home Evening".

The overarching vision for Home Evening was described:

... we advise and urge the inauguration of a "Home Evening" throughout the Church, at which time fathers and mothers may gather their boys and girls about them in the home and teach them the word of the Lord. They may thus learn more fully the needs and requirements of their families; at the same time familiarizing themselves and their children more thoroughly with the principles of the Gospel of Jesus Christ. This "Home Evening" should be devoted to prayer, singing hymns, songs, instrumental music, scripture-reading, family topics and specific instruction on the principles of the Gospel, and on the ethical problems of life, as well as the duties and obligations of children to parents, the home, the Church, society and the Nation. For the smaller children appropriate recitations, songs, stories and games may be introduced. Light refreshments of such a nature as may be largely prepared in the home might be served. Formality and stiffness should be studiously avoided, and all the family should participate in the exercises.

In 1965, under the direction of church president David O. McKay a manual was published for FHE lessons.

In 1970, church president Joseph Fielding Smith (son of Joseph F. Smith, who was president when the 1915 letter was issued) designated Monday night as the preferred time for Family Home Evening, asking local church units not to hold other church-related meetings or activities on that night. The New York Times reported in 1973 on Family Home Evening in the church commenting, "their way of attacking delinquency and deteriorating morality is to strengthen family solidarity through a Monday night get‐together in the home called the 'family home evening'."

In 1985 the church stopped publishing annual FHE lesson manuals and instead published the Family Home Evening Resource Book, which remained current for over thirty years.

In the church's October 2002 General Conference, church president Gordon B. Hinckley encouraged public school officials and others to keep Monday night free of activities and other obstructions, so that members might more easily hold FHE.

In 2018 the church changed the name from Family Home Evening back to the original name, Home Evening. At the same time the church emphasized Sunday as a day for gospel study in the home but proposed Monday evening as an option for a family activity night:

Members are encouraged to hold family activities on Monday or at other times. No Church activities, meetings, or baptismal services should be held after 6:00 p.m. on Mondays.

Leaders ensure that Church buildings and other facilities are closed on Monday nights. Receptions and similar activities may not be held in Church facilities on Monday nights.

As an exception, young single adult wards and single adult wards may hold activities on Monday nights, including in Church buildings.

== Home Evening away from family ==
The 2018 name change to Home Evening was part of a push by the church to support and include single members. The church invited single members to organize ad hoc home evening groups.

In addition, in places with a sufficient number of single adult members of the LDS Church, the church organizes singles wards, commonly near colleges and universities. These have long organized Home Evening groups. The purpose of these meetings is the same as that of family-based Home Evenings, but groups are composed of peers rather than family members. Both the ad hoc and organized home evening practices are described in the church's handbook:

Leaders or members who desire to participate may organize one or more home evening groups for single adults and other groups for young single adults. Generally, those who participate do not have children at home. In stakes with few single members, home evening groups may cross ward boundaries. In addition, single members may choose to gather virtually or in person for home gospel study. Come, Follow Me may be a resource.

== Elements of Home Evening ==
The elements of FHE have varied little over the century and more since the church instituted the practice. The church's current description of Home Evening is as follows:

Home evening is flexible according to members’ circumstances. It may be held on the Sabbath or other days and times. It may include:

- Gospel study and instruction (the materials may be used as desired).
- Serving others.
- Singing or playing hymns and Primary songs (see chapter 19).
- Supporting family members in Children and Youth development.
- A family council to set goals, resolve problems, and coordinate schedules.
- Recreational activities.

== 3rd-party spinoffs ==
In 2022, a group called Uplift Kids drew from FHE and other faith traditions to establish a similar program, which is intended to be broadly acceptable by families of any faith, mixed faiths, or no faith at all. The curriculum published by the group seeks to "provide a neutral baseline for discussing life’s deepest questions and for listening to kids’ questions." The creators readily acknowledge the influence of FHE in their publications, stating "the idea of nurturing spirituality at home is definitely influenced by the best aspects of Family Home Evening and the `home church’ idea that is part of ‘Come, Follow Me.’”
