= Mac McWhorter =

American football player and coach (born 1950)

Current position
- Title: Head coach assistant, offensive line coach
- Team: Madrid Bravos

Biographical details
- Born: June 17, 1950 (age 76); Atlanta, Georgia, U.S.

Playing career
- 1971–1974: Georgia
- Position: Guard

Coaching career (HC unless noted)
- 1974: Duluth HS (GA) (assistant)
- 1975–1978: Douglas CountyHS (GA) (assistant)
- 1979: Villa Rica HS (GA)
- 1980: Georgia Tech (JV)
- 1981–1984: Georgia Tech (OL)
- 1985–1986: Georgia (OL)
- 1987–1988: Alabama (OL)
- 1989: West Georgia
- 1990: Duke (OL)
- 1991–1995: Georgia (OL/TE/ST)
- 1996–1998: Clemson (OT/TE)
- 1999: Memphis (OC)
- 2000–2001: Georgia Tech (OL)
- 2001: Georgia Tech (interim HC)
- 2002–2010: Texas (OL)
- 2012–2013: Penn State (OL)
- 2023: Paris Musketeers (OL)
- 2024: Madrid Bravos (HC assistant / OL)

Head coaching record
- Overall: 5–7
- Bowls: 1–0

Accomplishments and honors

Awards
- First-team All-SEC (1973)

Hamilton Pierce "Mac" McWhorter (born June 17, 1950) is an American football coach and former player. He is the head coach assistant and offensive line coach for the Madrid Bravos of the European League of Football (ELF). McWhorter served as the head football coach at West Georgia College—now known as the University of West Georgia—for one season, in 1989. He was also the interim head coach at Georgia Tech for one game, in 2001 after George O'Leary resigned. McWhorter the 2001 Georgia Tech Yellow Jackets football team to a victory in the 2001 Seattle Bowl against No. 11-ranked Stanford.

McWhorter was an All-SEC guard at Georgia in 1973. McWhorter retired following the 2010 season with the Longhorns. The American Football Coaches of America voted Longhorn offensive line coach Mac McWhorter the top assistant coach in the country for 2008.

After spending 2011 out of football following his retirement at Texas, Penn State's new football coach Bill O'Brien convinced McWhorter to join the staff at Penn State, following the death of Joe Paterno. McWhorter, who one sportswriter described as O'Brien's "biggest get" onto the coaching staff at Penn State, despite his enjoyment of retirement and attending football games as a fan of the Georgia Bulldogs, agreed, and moved to the northeast for the first time in his life. His tenure at Penn State was not expected to last particularly long for a variety of reasons including parents in worsening health and grandchildren, but while at Penn State, he was beloved among his players, including offensive guard Miles Dieffenbach, who commented,

"We love him a lot ... He loves to have a good time. He's a funny guy. I don't know how old he is, but he's out there like he's 25 years old."

McWhorter noted that he loved coaching at Penn State, but had no timetable for how long he would coach. McWhorter retired following the 2013 season once again after not being retained by James Franklin.

"I thought it might be a great way to finish a career."

— McWhorter, October 20, 2013

== Head coaching record ==
Year	Team	Overall	Conference	Standing	Bowl/playoffs	Coaches^{#}	AP^{°}
West Georgia Braves (Gulf South Conference) (1989)
1989	West Georgia	4–7	3–5	T–6th			
West Georgia:		4–7	3–5				
Georgia Tech Yellow Jackets (Atlantic Coast Conference) (2001)
2001	Georgia Tech	1–0 (Note: McWhorter served as interim head coach for the Seattle Bowl after the resignation of George O'Leary following the conclusion of the regular season.)	0–0		W Seattle Bowl		24
Georgia Tech:		1–0	0–0				
Total:		5–7					
^{#}Rankings from final Coaches Poll.; ^{°}Rankings from final AP Poll.
