= The Church of Jesus Christ of Latter-day Saints in Bahrain =

- Area: Middle East/ Africa North
- Members: 231 (2025)
- Stakes: 1
- Wards: 1

The Church of Jesus Christ of Latter-day Saints in Kuwait
- Area: Middle East/ Africa North
- Members: 369 (2025)
- Wards: 1

The Church of Jesus Christ of Latter-day Saints in Bahrain refers to the Church of Jesus Christ of Latter-day Saints (LDS Church) and its members in Bahrain. Bahrain is headquarters of the Bahrain Stake which encompasses Bahrain, Kuwait, Saudi Arabia, and Yemen. In 2025, there were 231 members in the Bahrain Ward, the only congregation in the country. The Kuwait Ward, part of the Bahrain Stake, had 369 members. The LDS Church does not release membership figures in Saudi Arabia or Yemen due to lack of recognition.

== History ==
Membership in Bahrain
Year	Membership
1976	16
1988	35
2003	67
2009	114
2014	175
2019	245
2024	276
2025	231

A group formed in 1971 operated prior to the creation of the Bahrain Branch. The Bahrain Branch was organized in 1978 with Sidney MaGill as the first branch president. In 1976, membership consisted of eight adults and eight children in Bahrain. Four members were received by the Emir of Bahrain in 1989 and cordially welcomed to Bahrain from other Middle Eastern nations for church leadership meetings. The LDS Church has been legally recognized in Bahrain since 2001. Many stake activities for the Manama Bahrain Stake occur in Bahrain due to the level of religious freedom.

Bahrain was part of the church's Europe Central Area beginning in 2000. In the late 2000s, the Middle East/Africa North Area was created. The Manama Bahrain Stake was previously known as the Arabian Peninsula Stake. In 2011, the Manama Bahrain Stake, was divided to create the Abu Dhabi United Arab Emirates and the Manama Bahrain District. The Manama Bahrain District became a stake in 2014 with Kent LeRoy Christensen as president. In addition to the Bahrain Ward (formally Bahrain Branch), a group has historically operated in Bahrain to meet the needs of American military servicemen.

Since the 1970s, the church has had steady growth in Bahrain and the Middle East. LDS Church members in the region are primarily from western countries and the Philippines. Church services in the Arabian Peninsula are typically held on Friday, the Muslim Holy day. Proselyting, especially among Muslims, is prohibited in Middle Eastern countries.

== Manama Bahrain Stake ==
As of February 2023, the Manama Bahrain Stake consisted of congregations in the following countries:

=== Bahrain ===
Bahrain Ward is the only established congregation in Bahrain Due to the level of religious freedom in Bahrain, many activities of the stake occur in Bahrain. A separate serviceman's group for US military members exists in Bahrain when US military is present in the country.

=== Kuwait ===
Membership in Kuwait
Year	Membership
2001	50
2004	57
2009	70
2014	285
2019	365
2024	361
2025	369
Source: Wendall J. Ashton; Jim M. Wall, Deseret News, various years, Church Almanac Country Information: Kuwait

The Kuwait Ward of the Manama Bahrain Stake had 369 members as of December 31, 2025. As with most other congregations in the Middle East, it meets on Friday, the holy day in Islam. The Kuwait Government officially recognized the LDS Church in 2019.

=== Saudi Arabia ===
In 2018, as many as ten congregations meet privately in undisclosed locations in Saudi Arabia. There may be as many as 1,500 LDS Church members in Saudi Arabia in 2018.

=== Yemen ===
If there are any LDS Church congregations meeting in Yemen, it is likely done privately in the homes of members. Latter-day Saint Charities operates in Yemen which has included providing clean water to 350,000 people in Yemen.

== Missions ==
The Bahrain Stake is part of the Middle East/North Africa Area, the only LDS Church area without a mission. Members are encouraged to follow and obey the laws of the land. Proselyting, especially among Muslims, is prohibited in Middle Eastern countries.

== Temples ==
There are no temples in Bahrain. On April 5, 2020, church president Russell M. Nelson announced a temple will be constructed in Dubai.

290. Dubai United Arab Emirates Temple (Announced); Official website; News & images	
Location: Announced:	Dubai, United Arab Emirates; 5 April 2020 by Russell M. Nelson

== See also ==
- Religion in Bahrain
- Christianity in Bahrain
