= JFN (disambiguation) =

JFN may refer to:

- Japan FM Network, a Japanese commercial radio network
- Journal of Family Nursing, a quarterly peer-reviewed medical journal
- Northeast Ohio Regional Airport, the IAFA code IFN
- Joker Fuel of Norway, the UCI team code JFN
