= 2001 Seattle Bowl =

2001 Jeep Seattle Bowl
- 2001 Seattle Bowl logo
Georgia Tech Yellow Jackets	Stanford Cardinal
(7–5)	(9–2)
24	14
Head coach: Mac McWhorter (interim)	Head coach: Tyrone Willingham
	AP / Coaches / BCS; 11 / 11 / 9
	1	2	3	4	Total
Georgia Tech	7	10	0	7	24
Stanford	0	3	3	8	14
- Date: December 27, 2001
- Season: 2001
- Stadium: Safeco Field
- Location: Seattle, Washington
- Attendance: 30,144
- Payout: US$750,000 per team

United States TV coverage
- Network: ESPN2
- Announcers: Dave Barnett (play-by-play); Bill Curry & Mike Golic (analysts); Michele Tafoya (sidelines)

The 2001 Jeep Seattle Bowl, played in December, was the inaugural edition of the college football bowl game under this name (previously known as the Oahu Bowl) The game was held at Safeco Field in Seattle, Washington and featured Georgia Tech Yellow Jackets from the ACC against the Stanford Cardinal from the Pac-10. This game marked the final competition of the 2001 football season for both teams, resulting in a 24–14 upset victory for Georgia Tech over the 11th-ranked Stanford team.

The game was played at Safeco Field because Qwest Field had not yet been completed.

== Coaches ==
Georgia Tech's interim coach, Mac McWhorter, led the team in his only game as head coach, filling in for George O'Leary, who had announced his resignation to take the same position at Notre Dame. However, due to a controversy surrounding O'Leary's resume, Tyrone Willingham, McWhorter's counterpart in the Seattle Bowl, ironically ended up as the new Notre Dame coach. As a result, this edition of the Seattle Bowl was Willingham's final game as Stanford's head coach.

== See also ==
- Seattle Bowl
