= Clarence Dennis =

American cardiothoracic surgeon

- Born: June 16, 1909; St. Paul, Minnesota; United States
- Died: July 11, 2005 (aged 96); St. Paul, Minnesota; United States
- Education: Johns Hopkins (M.D.)
- Known for: pioneering cardiopulmonary bypass
- Medical career
- Profession: Surgeon
- Institutions: University of Minnesota, SUNY Downstate Medical Center, National Institutes of Health, SUNY Stony Brook
- Sub-specialties: cardiothoracic surgery
- Research: open-heart surgery

Clarence Dennis (June 16, 1909 – July 11, 2005) was an American cardiothoracic surgeon best known for his work in pioneering cardiopulmonary bypass (CPB). He had invented one of the first heart-lung bypass machines, and in 1951 he became the first to use such a device during an open-heart operation.

== Background ==
Dennis was born in St. Paul, Minnesota on June 16, 1909, the son of Warren, a surgeon, and Clara Van Orman Dennis. He completed his MD at Johns Hopkins in 1935 and did his surgical residency at the University of Minnesota.

== Career ==
Dennis went on to earn an MS in physiology and a PhD in surgery by 1940, and eventually became a full professor at the University of Minnesota. Meanwhile, Dennis began work on his pump-oxygenator in 1946. He met with John Heysham Gibbon, the person who would later perfect cardiopulmonary bypass. In 1951, the first attempt with CPB was attempted on humans with Dennis at the helm, along with Dwight S. Spreng Jr., George E. Nelson, Russell M. Nelson, John V. Thomas, Walter Phillip Eder, and Richard L. Varco. The patient was a 6-year-old girl, dying from a congenital heart defect. The heart-lung machine worked well for the first 40 minutes, but the heart defect was unrepairable and the patient died. The second use of the machine was futile as well, this time due to a technician error. He would perform no further cases at the University of Minnesota.

Dennis was recruited to SUNY Downstate Medical Center in New York later in 1951 to chair the department of surgery. There, he and his team eventually performed their first successful operation using the heart-lung machine in 1955. As chair, he helped build the department, including the addition of residency and research programs. He pioneered cardiopulmonary bypass to in patients with cardiac shock following myocardial infarction.

After more than twenty years at SUNY, Dennis left in 1972 and went to work at the National Institutes of Health in Bethesda, MD. In 1975, Clarence Dennis was appointed to the faculty of SUNY Stony Brook, remaining there until his retirement in 1988. He moved back to St Paul in 1991, and directed the University of Minnesota's Cancer Detection Center, founded by Owen Harding Wangensteen, the person who initially assigned Dennis the task of creating a pump oxygenator in the 1930s. In 1996, Dennis announced his retirement at the age of 86, feeling that his macular degeneration and advanced age were preventing him from accomplishing several worth-while publications to the scientific literature. He died on July 11, 2005, at the age of 96, from complications arising from dementia in his hometown of St. Paul, Minnesota.
