= Name of the Church of Jesus Christ of Latter-day Saints =

The name of the Church of Jesus Christ of Latter-day Saints (LDS Church) is derived from an 1838 revelation church founder Joseph Smith said he received. Church leaders have long emphasized the church's full name (though more especially since 2018), and have resisted the application of informal or shortened names, especially those which omit "Jesus Christ". These informal and shortened names include the "Mormon Church", the "LDS Church", and the "Church of the Latter-day Saints".

== Historical names of the church ==
The LDS Church traces its founding to April 6, 1830, when Smith and five other men formally established the Church of Christ. The church was known by this name from 1830 to 1834.

In the 1830s, the fact that a number of U.S. churches, including some Congregational churches and Restoration Movement churches, also used the name "Church of Christ" caused a considerable degree of confusion. On May 3, 1834, the church adopted a resolution that it would be known thereafter as "The Church of the Latter Day Saints". At various times the church was also referred to as "The Church of Jesus Christ", "The Church of God", and "The Church of Christ of Latter Day Saints".

== Adoption of the current name ==
In the late 1830s, Smith founded a new headquarters in Far West, Missouri. At Far West on April 26, 1838, Smith recorded a revelation from God renaming the organization the "Church of Jesus Christ of Latter Day Saints". The church was known by this name until after Smith's death in 1844; occasionally the name would be written with a hyphen between the words "Latter" and "Day".

After Smith's death, competing Latter Day Saint denominations organized under the leadership of a number of successors. The largest of these, led by Brigham Young, continued using "Church of Jesus Christ of Latter Day Saints" until incorporation on February 8, 1851, by the legislature of the provisional State of Deseret, when the church standardized the spelling of its name as "The Church of Jesus Christ of Latter-day Saints", a hyphenated "Latter-day", and a British-style lower-case "d". In January 1855, the legislature of Utah Territory re-enacted the charter which incorporated the church under this name.

In 1876, the church issued a new edition of the Doctrine and Covenants which contains the text of significant revelations received by Joseph Smith. In this new edition—the first revision since before Smith's death—the capitalization and hyphenation of the church's name in the 1838 revelation to Smith was changed to reflect the name format the church had since adopted:

[A]nd unto all the elders and people of my Church of Jesus Christ of Latter-day Saints, scattered abroad in all the world; For thus shall my church be called in the last days, even the Church of Jesus Christ of Latter-day Saints.

The definite article "The" was not capitalized in D&C 115:4 of the 1876 edition; it was not until the 1921 edition that it was capitalized. Until the late-20th century, church publications inconsistently capitalized "The" in the name of the church in running text. Today, church publications invariably capitalize "The" in all contexts.

Today, "The Church of Jesus Christ of Latter-day Saints" is a registered trademark owned by the LDS Church. In contrast, "Church of Jesus Christ of Latter Day Saints" is a public-domain name and is used by some smaller Latter Day Saint denominations, including the Strangites.

== Meaning ==
The church teaches that its name is a significant indicator of its origin and mission. The following teachings have been given on the meanings of the various components of the church's name:

- The Church: "Note that the article The begins with a capital letter. This is an important part of the title, for the Church is the official organization of baptized believers who have taken upon themselves the name of Christ." "The word The indicates the unique position of the restored Church among the religions of the world." "The word the is significant: not just Church of Jesus Christ of Latter-day Saints, because to say 'The Church' distinguishes this as the only true church on the face of the earth."
- of Jesus Christ: "By divine directive, the title of the Church bears the sacred name of Jesus Christ, whose church this is. ... We know Him to be 'the chief corner stone' upon which the organization of His Church is based. ... We know Him to be the Rock from whom revelation comes to His authorized agents ... and to all who worthily seek Him". "The words Church of Jesus Christ declare that it is His Church. In the Book of Mormon, Jesus taught: 'And how be it my church save it be called in my name? For if a church be called in Moses' name then it be Moses' church; or if it be called in the name of a man [like Mormon] then it be the church of a man; but if it be called in my name then it is my church, if it so be that they are built upon my gospel' (3 Nephi 27:8)." "By implication, calling the Church by the name Mormon would make it Mormon's Church. While most Church members are not offended by the title Mormon, they prefer the name that properly underscores their relationship to Christ."
- of Latter-day: "Of Latter-day explains that it is the same Church as the Church that Jesus Christ established during His mortal ministry but restored in these latter days."
- Saints: "Saints means that its members follow Him and strive to do His will, keep His commandments, and prepare once again to live with Him and our Heavenly Father in the future. Saint simply refers to those who seek to make their lives holy by covenanting to follow Christ." "Despite its use in ninety-eight verses of the Bible, the term saint is still not well understood. Some mistakenly think that it implies beatification or perfection. Not so! A saint is a believer in Christ and knows of His perfect love. ... A saint serves others . ... A saint is tolerant, and is attentive to the pleadings of other human beings . ... A saint 'refrain[s] from idleness' ... and seeks learning by study, and also by faith. ... A saint is honest and kind . ... A saint is an honorable citizen . ... A saint resolves any differences with others honorably and peacefully and is constant in courtesy . ... A saint shuns that which is unclean or degrading and avoids excess even of that which is good. Perhaps above all, a saint is reverent. Reverence for the Lord, for the earth He created, for leaders, for the dignity of others, for the law, for the sanctity of life, for chapels and other buildings, are all evidences of saintly attitudes."

== Informal and abbreviated names ==
Because of the belief in the Book of Mormon among Joseph Smith's followers, in the 1830s people outside the church began to refer to its members as "Mormonites" or "Mormons" and the church as the "Mormon Church". Smith and other church leaders considered these informal or abbreviated terms to be derogatory and inappropriate, as editorialized in 1834:

Others may call themselves by their own, or by other names, and have the privilege of wearing them without our changing them or attempting so to do; but we do not accept the above title, nor shall we wear it as our name, though it may be lavished out upon us double to what it has heretofore been.

— Second Elder Oliver Cowdery,

Today, it remains common for individuals and media outside of the church to refer to it as the "Mormon Church". Church leaders have resisted these practices and have asked members not to refer to the church in these ways.

In 2001, the LDS Church Saints issued a style guide on its name, requesting that those writing about the church adhere to the following guidelines:

- In the first reference, the full name of the Church is preferred: "The Church of Jesus Christ of Latter-day Saints."
- Please avoid the use of "Mormon Church", "LDS Church" or the "Church of the Latter-day Saints."
- When a shortened reference is needed, the terms "the Church" or "the Church of Jesus Christ" are encouraged.
- When referring to Church members, the term "Latter-day Saints" is preferred, though "Mormons" is acceptable.

On publication of the 2001 style guide, The New York Times reported that the release of the style guide recommendations was a "'deliberate reaffirmation' of a long effort in favor of wider use of the church's full title". Apostle Dallin H. Oaks told the Times that "church leaders decided it was possible to begin using the abbreviated name of Church of Jesus Christ because no other major Christian body in the United States had laid claim to it." Dr. Jan Shipps, an expert on the Latter Day Saint movement, suggested that these continuing efforts to emphasize the church's name reflect its members' longstanding desire that their beliefs "be understood as a Christian tradition."

On August 16, 2018, church president Russell M. Nelson reiterated the request that church members and others call the church by its full name instead of using the terms "LDS Church", "Mormon Church", and "Mormonism". Nelson reaffirmed his position during the October 2018 General Conference, stating: "To remove the Lord's name from the Lord's Church is a major victory for Satan." He further requested that "LDS" and "Mormon" not be used to refer to its membership or belief system, and the style guide was updated accordingly. Among other changes, this update rearranged the above points and replaced the second and fourth as follows:

- While the term "Mormon Church" has long been publicly applied to the Church as a nickname, it is not an authorized title, and the Church discourages its use. Thus, please avoid using the abbreviation "LDS" or the nickname "Mormon" as substitutes for the name of the Church, as in "Mormon Church," "LDS Church," or "Church of the Latter-day Saints."
- When referring to Church members, the terms "members of The Church of Jesus Christ of Latter-day Saints," "Latter-day Saints,” "members of the Church of Jesus Christ" and "members of the restored Church of Jesus Christ" are preferred. We ask that the term "Mormons" and "LDS" not be used.

Subsequent to this announcement, the church began the "complex effort in numerous global languages" and requested that "all... be patient and courteous as we work together to use and share the proper name of The Church of Jesus Christ of Latter-day Saints throughout the world." Church web sites were updated with new URLs, social media accounts were updated to further emphasize the name of the church, and the church's premier vocal ensemble, then best known as the "Mormon Tabernacle Choir", was officially renamed The Tabernacle Choir at Temple Square. Reaction to the name change policy in the media, by the general public, and even among church members has been mixed, with the preferred second–reference terms (such as "the Church of Jesus Christ" and "the restored Church of Jesus Christ") generally being shunned except by the church's own adherents. However, media in Utah, including the church-owned Deseret News, KSL-TV, and KSL radio, now tend to use "Latter-day Saints" when referring to the church in headlines.
