= Wendy Watson Nelson =

American academic

- Born: May 31, 1950 (age 76)
- Education: University of Hawaii, Manoa (BA); Brigham Young University (MA); University of Calgary (PhD)
- Occupations: Family therapist, professor
- Spouse: Russell M. Nelson (m. 2006; died 2025)

Wendy L. Watson Nelson (born May 31, 1950) is a Canadian-American marriage and family therapist and professor. She worked with the Family Nursing Unit (FNU) at the University of Calgary (U of C) from 1983 to 1992, training graduate students to use family systems therapy with families of patients. Her academic work in articles and in the book Beliefs: The Heart of Healing in Families and Illness helped develop a practical and theoretical framework for family systems nursing. She is the widow of Russell M. Nelson, former president of the Church of Jesus Christ of Latter-day Saints (LDS Church).

== Education ==
Wendy Watson grew up in Raymond, Alberta. She is the second of three children born to Leonard and Laura McLean Watson. She received her RN certification from the Calgary General Hospital School of Nursing in 1970. She earned a bachelor's degree in psychology from the University of Hawaii at Manoa in 1973 and a master's degree in marriage and family therapy at Brigham Young University (BYU) in 1975.

== Career ==
Beginning in 1980, Watson practiced as a marriage and family therapist part-time, which she continued until at least 2004. She started teaching at the U of C as an assistant professor on the nursing faculty in 1981, and completed a PhD in family therapy and gerontology there in 1984. In 1986 she became an associate professor on the nursing faculty.

Watson co-edited The Cutting Edge of Family Nursing in 1990, in which she co-authored a chapter describing the FNU at U of C, a unit that provided family therapy to patients and training to graduate nursing students. This work was a clinical application of the family systems nursing taught at U of C's nursing program. The family systems nursing approach used knowledge of nursing and family therapy to focus on the family as the "unit of care", where "the family's ability to change depends upon their ability to alter their perception of the problem". Watson was the education coordinator in the FNU from 1983 to 1992. In her work with the FNU, she wrote and produced five educational videos. The U of C awarded her a Teaching Excellence Award in 1991.

In 1993, she joined the BYU College of Family, Home and Social Sciences as an associate professor in the marriage and family therapy graduate program. From 1994 to 1997, she was a reviewer for the Journal of Family Nursing. In 1996, she co-authored Beliefs: The Heart of Healing in Families and Illness with Lorraine M. Wright and Janice M. Bell. The authors developed the Family Systems Nursing Model, a "world famous model for family nursing practice". Larry Mauksch, reviewing the book in Families, Systems, and Health, commended the extensive literature review and approachable prose, but criticized the book's method of identifying and analyzing moments of change in therapy as unscientific. Mauksch wrote that the book "extended the application of narrative approaches beyond psychosocial problems to broader, biopsychosocial-spiritual contexts". The book was later translated into Swedish and Japanese. Watson's work on the book and with the FNU is often cited as helping to develop the family systems nursing framework. Watson became a full professor in 1997. She wrote many journal articles and book chapters during her academic career.

Nelson chaired BYU's Women's Conference in 1999 and 2000. She has spoken internationally at more than two hundred scholarly conferences. She retired in May 2006.

== Personal life ==
She and Russell M. Nelson were married in the Salt Lake Temple on April 6, 2006, while Nelson was a member of the LDS Church's Quorum of the Twelve Apostles.
