= Seattle Bowl =

Seattle Bowl (defunct)
- Stadium: Seahawks Stadium
- Location: Seattle, Washington
- Previous stadiums: Safeco Field (2001)
- Operated: 2001–2002
- Conference tie-ins: ACC, Pac-10

Former names
- Oahu Bowl

The Seattle Bowl was a college football bowl game played in 2001 and 2002 between teams from the Atlantic Coast Conference and the Pacific-10 Conference in Seattle. This bowl game was a continuation of the Oʻahu Bowl which had moved to Seattle. The 2001 game was played at Safeco Field and the 2002 game was played at Seahawks Stadium. The game was discontinued in 2003 when financing could not be secured.

== Bowl history ==
Although December in Seattle is traditionally home to an average temperature of 41° and 2/3 of the days have rain, Oʻahu Bowl officials sought to move their game to the west coast mainland after the 2000 season. Hawai'i had already hosted the long-standing Aloha Bowl (which also lost its certification after the 2000 season after an aborted attempt to move the bowl to San Francisco) and bowl officials felt that a game with a west coast tie-in could work in the football-friendly city of Seattle. The committee and city also had hoped that the game would add tourist dollars to what is normally the slowest tourism week of the year. The game would match the fifth place teams from the ACC and Pac-10 at Safeco Field.

In 2001 the game was able to secure sponsorship from Jeep and matched the Georgia Tech Yellow Jackets of the ACC against the then 11th ranked nationally Stanford University Cardinal. The Yellow Jackets pulled off the upset win by a score of 24–14 in front of 30,144 fans.

The 2002 game would almost not happen at all. The Seattle Bowl beat an NCAA mandated deadline for a letter of credit for $1.5 million by less than one hour to insure a second game. The game was moved to its intended home at Seahawks Stadium and would match Oregon against Wake Forest. Wake Forest would win the game by a score of 38–17. The attendance of the game would improve to 38,241, helped by the nearby Oregon Ducks bringing a large contingent of fans. However, the game had increased its payout to $1 million per team and was unable to attract a title sponsor resulting in heavy losses.

After the 2002 game's financial losses it was clear that a 2003 game would be a longshot. Bowl president Terry Daw relinquished ownership of the game and the bowl would miss two deadlines imposed by the NCAA to provide a $1.5 million letter of credit. Further in April, 2003 it was reported that the bowl game was being sued by the Mountain West Conference and the company who purchased the bowl game from Daw, known as Pro Sports & Entertainment Inc., was discovered to not have had a valid business since 2001. The Mountain West had originally contracted to send its Number 4 team to the bowl in 2002 and pledged $250,000 to the bowl to secure its spot. The Conference did not produce a 4th bowl eligible team for the season and as such Oregon was picked as a replacement. The lawsuit claims that the $250,000 was never returned to the Conference as per the terms of the contract.

After Pro Sports & Entertainment was unable to secure a primary sponsor for the game, the bowl was not renewed by the NCAA for the 2003 bowl season.

== Game results ==
Rankings are based on the AP Poll prior to the game being played.

Date Played	Winning Team		Losing Team		Attendance	Notes
December 27, 2001	Georgia Tech	24	#11 Stanford	14	30,144	notes
December 30, 2002	Wake Forest	38	Oregon	17	38,241	notes

== Appearances by team ==
Rank	Team	Appearances	Record	Win pct.
T1	Georgia Tech	1	1–0	1.000
T1	Wake Forest	1	1–0	1.000
T1	Oregon	1	0–1	.000
T1	Stanford	1	0–1	.000

== Appearances by conference ==
Rank	Conference	Appearances	Record	Win pct.	Number of Teams	Teams
T1	ACC	2	2–0	1.000	2	Georgia Tech (1–0) Wake Forest (1–0)
T1	Pac-10	2	0–2	.000	2	Oregon (0–1) Stanford (0–1)

== See also ==
- List of college bowl games
