= Come, Follow Me (LDS Church) =

- Language: English (original) (available in ~72 languages)
- Publisher: The Church of Jesus Christ of Latter-day Saints
- Publication date: 2023
- Publication place: United States

Come, Follow Me—For Home and Church is the official teaching manual of the Church of Jesus Christ of Latter-day Saints.

== History ==
On June 29, 2018, church president Russell M. Nelson announced the creation of Come, Follow Me. This announcement came soon after the change from 3 hours to 2 hours for Sunday worship services. Come, Follow Me—For Individuals and Families was released with the intent that families would use the additional hour for home study using the manual. Additionally, versions were created to replace other teaching manuals being used. Gospel Principles and Gospel Doctrine Teacher's Manual were replaced with Come, Follow Me—For Sunday School. Primary 1 through Primary 7 were replaced by Come, Follow Me—For Primary. Come, Follow Me—For Young Women and Aaronic Priesthood Quorum replaced the various manuals for Young Women and Young Men groups.

In April 2023, the church announced that all of the manuals would be combined into one, Come, Follow Me—For Home and Church, starting in January 2024.
