= Russell M. Nelson =

LDS Church president (1924–2025)

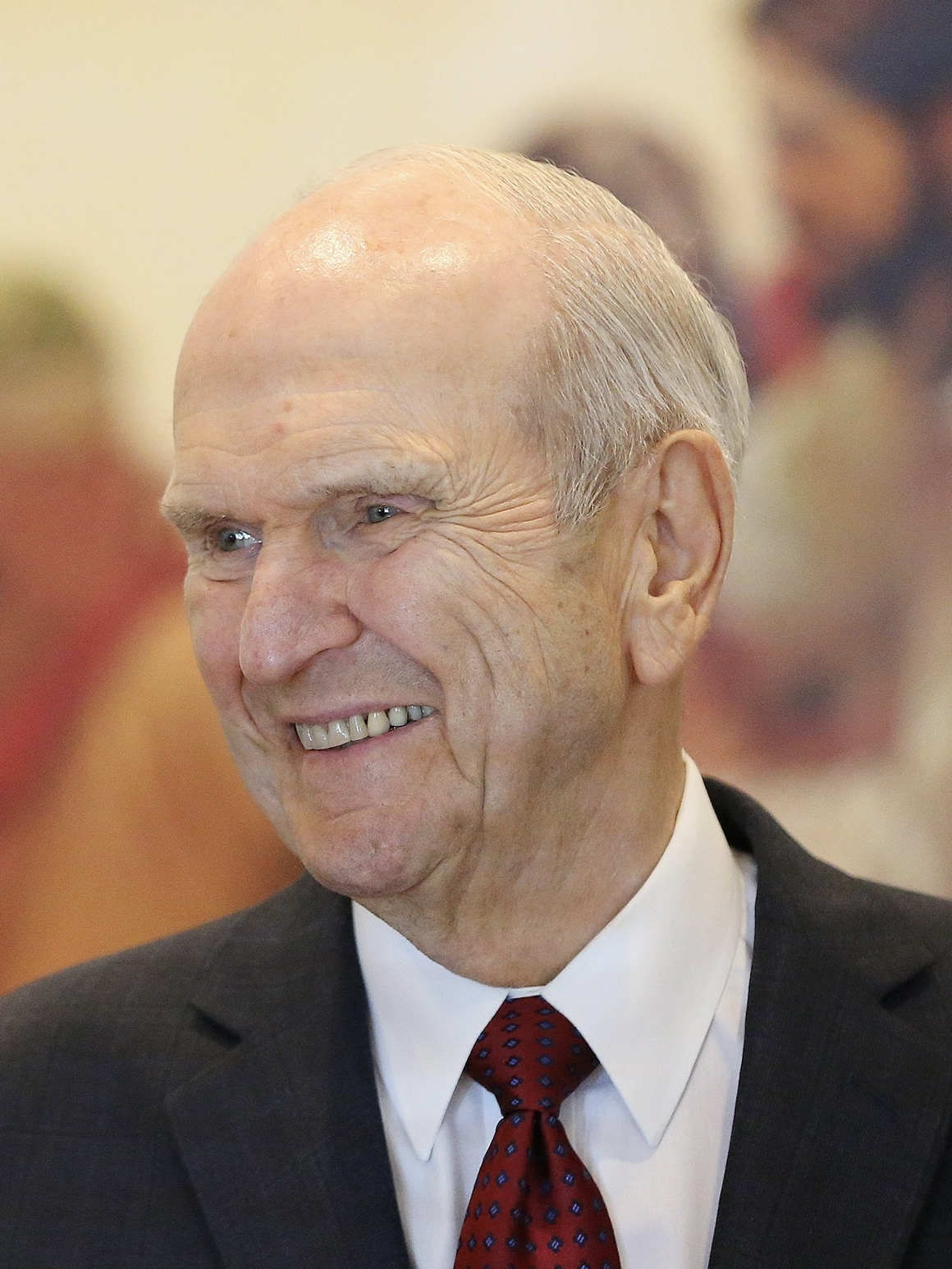
- Nelson in 2018

17th President of the Church of Jesus Christ of Latter-day Saints
- January 14, 2018 – September 27, 2025
- Predecessor: Thomas S. Monson
- Successor: Dallin H. Oaks

President of the Quorum of the Twelve Apostles
- July 3, 2015 – January 14, 2018
- Predecessor: Boyd K. Packer
- Successor: Dallin H. Oaks
- End reason: Became President of the Church

Quorum of the Twelve Apostles
- April 7, 1984 – January 14, 2018
- Called by: Spencer W. Kimball
- End reason: Became President of the Church

LDS Church Apostle
- April 12, 1984 – September 27, 2025
- Called by: Spencer W. Kimball
- Reason: Death of LeGrand Richards
- Reorganization at end of term: Gérald Caussé ordained

Military career
- 1951–1953
- Service/branch: United States Army
- Rank: Captain
- Unit: Army Medical Corps
- Battles/wars: Korean War

Personal details
- Born: Russell Marion Nelson; September 9, 1924; Salt Lake City, Utah, U.S.
- Died: September 27, 2025 (aged 101); Salt Lake City, Utah, U.S.
- Education: University of Utah (BA, MD); University of Minnesota (PhD)
- Occupation: Cardiothoracic surgeon
- Spouse(s): Dantzel White (m. 1945; died 2005) Wendy L. Watson (m. 2006)
- Children: 10 (2 deceased)
- Signature

Russell Marion Nelson Sr. (September 9, 1924 – September 27, 2025) was an American religious leader and surgeon who was the seventeenth president of the Church of Jesus Christ of Latter-day Saints (LDS Church) from 2018 until his death in 2025. Before becoming church president, Nelson was a member of its Quorum of the Twelve Apostles for nearly thirty-four years and was the quorum president from 2015 to 2018. As church president, Nelson was recognized by the church as the prophet, seer, and revelator.

A native of Salt Lake City, Nelson attended the University of Utah for his undergraduate and medical school education. He then did his medical residency and earned a PhD at the University of Minnesota, where he was a member of the research team of Clarence Dennis that in 1951 pioneered the first human open-heart surgery using cardiopulmonary bypass. After serving in the U.S. Army Medical Corps during the Korean War, Nelson returned to Salt Lake City and accepted a professorship at the University of Utah School of Medicine. He spent the next twenty-nine years working in the field of cardiothoracic surgery. Nelson became a noted heart surgeon and served as president of the Society for Vascular Surgery and the Utah Medical Association.

Nelson served in a variety of lay LDS Church leadership positions during his surgical career, beginning locally in Salt Lake City and then as the church's Sunday School general president from 1971 to 1979. In 1984, Nelson and jurist Dallin H. Oaks were selected to fill two vacancies in the church's Quorum of the Twelve Apostles. Living to the age of 101, Nelson was the oldest president in the church’s history.

== Early life and education ==
Nelson was born on September 9, 1924, at Holy Cross Hospital in Salt Lake City, Utah, to Floss Edna (née Anderson) and Marion Clavar Nelson. He had two sisters, Marjory and Enid, and a brother, Robert. Nelson's father was a reporter for the Deseret News and later became general manager of Gillham Advertising, Utah's earliest advertising agency. His parents were not active in the Latter-day Saint faith while he was a youth, but they did send him to Sunday school, and he was baptized a member of the church at age sixteen.

Nelson studied at LDS Business College in his mid-teens (concurrently with high school enrollment) and worked as an assistant secretary at a bank. He graduated from East High School at age sixteen and enrolled at the University of Utah, where he was a member of the Beta Epsilon chapter of Sigma Chi and Owl and Key. He graduated in 1945 with a bachelor's degree and Phi Beta Kappa membership. He then attended the University of Utah School of Medicine, graduating with a Doctor of Medicine degree in 1947, ranked first in his class. He began his first year of medical school while still an undergraduate, and he completed the four-year MD program in only three years.

After medical school, Nelson went to the University of Minnesota for his medical residency. He became a member of the research team of surgeon Clarence Dennis developing the heart-lung machine that in April 1951 supported the first human open-heart surgery using cardiopulmonary bypass. Nelson received a Ph.D. from Minnesota in 1954 for his research contributions.

== Medical career ==
Nelson served a two-year term of duty in the U.S. Army Medical Corps during the Korean War, and was stationed at Walter Reed Army Medical Center in Washington, D.C. While on duty, he was assigned to a research group formed by the commandant of the graduate school at Walter Reed, Col. William S. Stone, and led by Fiorindo A. Simeone, a professor of surgery at Case Western Reserve University in Cleveland who had been a clinical investigator in the Mediterranean Theater during World War II. This team was focused on ways to improve the treatment of the wounded, and was sent to all five MASH units active in Korea along with two major evacuation hospitals, several field station hospitals, a prisoner of war camp and larger evacuation hospitals in Japan, Hawaii, and the mainland United States in order to implement such improvements. At one point, the team came close enough to the front that they received fire from enemy artillery positions, which missed them. After 20 months in service, he left active duty at the rank of captain. Following his military service, he did a year of work and surgical training at Massachusetts General Hospital.

In 1955, Nelson returned to Salt Lake City and accepted a faculty position at the University of Utah School of Medicine. There he built his own heart-lung bypass machine and used it to support the first open-heart surgery in the United States west of the Mississippi River. That operation was performed at the Salt Lake General Hospital (SLGH, later University of Utah Hospital) on an adult with an atrial septal defect. Nelson was the third surgeon in the United States to perform an open-heart operation successfully. Nelson was also the director of the University of Utah thoracic surgery residency program.

In March 1956, he performed the first successful pediatric cardiac operation at the SLGH, a total repair of tetralogy of Fallot in a four-year-old girl. He was at the forefront of surgeons focusing attention on coronary artery disease, and contributed to the advance of valvular surgery as well. In 1960, he performed one of the first-ever repairs of tricuspid valve regurgitation. His patient was a Latter-day Saint stake patriarch. He also provided the first surgical intervention for tricuspid regurgitation, a disorder that allows blood to flow backward into the right upper heart chamber. In an indication of his surgical skill, a 1968 case series of his aortic valve replacements demonstrated an exceptionally low peri-operative mortality. Later, he performed the same operation on future church president Spencer W. Kimball, replacing his damaged aortic valve. In 1985, Nelson along with his colleague, Conrad B. Jenson, performed a quadruple bypass surgery on the Chinese opera performer Fang Rongxiang (1925–1989).

Nelson first operated out of the University of Utah's medical school. He later had a practice at the Salt Lake Clinic with admission privileges at LDS Hospital. In 1964, he set up his own private practice with him as the lead and Conrad Jenson as an associate. In 1966, Nelson became head of the thoracic residency program that combined resources from the University of Utah Medical School, LDS Hospital, Primary Children's Hospital and the VA Hospital in Salt Lake City.

In 1965, the University of Chicago offered Nelson the position as head of their department of thoracic surgery. Dallin H. Oaks, then a law professor at Chicago and a fellow Latter-day Saint, actively worked to recruit Nelson. However, after consulting with church president David O. McKay, Nelson turned down the offer.

Nelson became involved with the administrative aspects of medicine and was elected president of the Utah State Medical Association. He was chair of the Division of Thoracic Surgery at LDS Hospital.

In 1981, Nelson held appointments as a visiting professor of surgery at the National Institute of Cardiology in Mexico City and the Catholic University in Santiago, Chile. In May 1982, he was a visiting professor at the Hospital de Clinicas in Montevideo, Uruguay.

Nelson was honored nationally by being elected president of the Society for Vascular Surgery for the year 1975. He was also a director of the American Board of Thoracic Surgery. Nelson traveled extensively as a medical doctor and addressed conferences in many parts of Latin America and Africa, as well as in India and China. He performed a total of nearly 7,000 operations before his call to be an apostle.

In 2015, the University of Utah, along with the American College of Cardiology, created the Russell M. Nelson, MD, PhD, Visiting Professorship in Cardiothoracic Surgery.

== LDS Church service ==
In addition to his medical work, Nelson served frequently as a leader in the LDS Church. In Minnesota, he served as what was then known as Sunday School superintendent in his local congregation. In Washington, D.C., he was a counselor in the bishopric of the ward that church apostle Ezra Taft Benson regularly attended while serving as secretary of agriculture to Dwight D. Eisenhower. In Massachusetts, Nelson was the secretary for the adult Aaronic priesthood organization in his Boston-area branch.

After returning to Salt Lake City, he was called as priest quorum advisor in the Garden Park Ward, working with over fifty boys ages sixteen to eighteen. He next served as member of the Bonneville Stake YMMIA superintendency (a position that is roughly equivalent to a modern counselor in the stake young men's presidency) and then as a counselor in the bishopric of the Garden Park Ward. He was set apart as a counselor in the bishopric by Joseph Fielding Smith, whose son-in-law was the bishop. Nelson served in that bishopric for over five years at a time when the ward had over 1,000 members. He then moved to the Yale Second Ward, still in the Bonneville Stake, and was called as a member of the stake high council. He later served as a stake president in Salt Lake City from 1964 to 1971, with fellow future apostle Joseph B. Wirthlin serving as his second counselor. From 1955 to 1965, Nelson served as a missionary on Temple Square every Thursday afternoon for about two hours giving tours to visitors. This calling was extended by Richard L. Evans, an apostle and the lead figure over publicity efforts on Temple Square.

Nelson also served for eight years as the church's Sunday School general president. During his tenure, the Sunday School developed a unified eight-year cycle of covering the church's scriptures in its curriculum. There was also a shift from having members of the Sunday School general board do all the training for new teachers to providing materials which developed into the book Teaching: No Greater Call.

Nelson later served for four and a half years as a regional representative. For approximately half of this time, he was assigned to oversee the fourteen student stakes at Brigham Young University. He then worked with stakes in the Kearns, Utah area for the rest of his tenure.

=== Apostle ===
Nelson was called as an apostle by church president Spencer W. Kimball, whom he had served as a personal physician for many years. Nelson was sustained as a member of the Quorum of the Twelve Apostles on April 7, 1984, during the church's general conference. He was ordained an apostle on April 12, 1984, by Gordon B. Hinckley. At the same conference, Dallin H. Oaks was sustained as a member of the Quorum of the Twelve. Nelson and Oaks filled the vacancies in the Quorum created by the deaths of LeGrand Richards and Mark E. Petersen. Early in his service as an apostle, Nelson was an adviser to the church's Young Women organization and was supportive of the developing of the Young Women values and Personal Progress program.

In 1991, Nelson served as the negotiator for the church with the Internal Revenue Service over whether contributions to support missionaries serving would be tax deductible. In 1992, he served on the Strengthening Church Members Committee, alongside fellow apostle James E. Faust. In 1993, he was the church's lead delegate to the Parliament on World Religions. For a time he was also the church's representative to a US State Department committee on international religious freedom.

Nelson's assignments as an apostle included supervisory responsibility for the church in Africa. In 2009, he, along with his wife and others, were attacked while in Mozambique. He also made several other visits to the continent, including one to Kenya in 2011.

From 2007 to 2015, Nelson was a member of the Church Board of Education, the governing body of the Church Educational System, and the chairman of its executive committee. He was succeeded as chairman of the executive committee by Oaks.

Following the death of Boyd K. Packer on July 3, 2015, Nelson became the most senior member of the Quorum of the Twelve and the quorum's president. Nelson was set apart as the quorum president on July 15, 2015, by Thomas S. Monson.

Nelson made his first international trip as quorum president to Central America in late August 2015. The following month, Nelson dedicated the renovated Aaronic Priesthood Restoration Site in Pennsylvania, where church members believe the Aaronic and Melchizedek priesthoods were restored.

In 2016, as president of the Quorum of the Twelve Apostles, Nelson declared that the church's governing council had received a revelation from God requiring First Presidency approval before the baptism of minor children that lived with same-sex parents. "It was our privilege as apostles to sustain what had been revealed to President Monson," Nelson said. Citing "continuing revelation" and a changing global context, this policy was adjusted in 2019, such that First Presidency approval was no longer required for the children to be baptized.

==== Eastern Europe ====
After Monson's call to the First Presidency in 1985, Nelson was assigned as the apostle to oversee the work of the church in Eastern Europe. In this assignment, he worked closely with Dennis B. Neuenschwander and Hans B. Ringger. Nelson was involved in the first meetings between church leaders and government officials of Bulgaria, Romania, and the Soviet Union, and worked to continue expansion of the church and recognition efforts in Czechoslovakia, Hungary, and Poland.

In August 2010, Nelson journeyed to the dedication of the Kyiv Ukraine Temple. Afterwards, in September, he traveled to church meetings in several European countries. He pronounced blessings upon Croatia, Slovenia, Macedonia, Bosnia and Herzegovina, and Kosovo while visiting each of those countries; these serve as addendums to Monson's 1985 dedication of Yugoslavia for the preaching of the gospel.

Nelson's only son, Russell M. Nelson Jr., served as an missionary of the church in Russia. In 2011, Nelson Sr. returned to Russia to organize the first church stake in that country, headquartered in Moscow.

==== Central Asia ====
In August 2003, Nelson became the first member of the Quorum of the Twelve to visit Kazakhstan. While there, Nelson visited government officials, was interviewed by Yuzhnaya Stalitsa television, and dedicated that country for the preaching of the gospel.

==== China ====
When he was Sunday School general president, Nelson attended a meeting where Kimball urged those present to learn Chinese. Nelson took up this challenge and developed elementary proficiency in Mandarin. He developed ties with the medical community in China and made several trips there to train surgeons. In 1985, Nelson was the first person to be made an honorary professor of Shandong Medical College. In 1995, Nelson went to Beijing, along with Neal A. Maxwell and other church leaders, on an official invitation of Li Lanqing, the Vice Premier of China.

=== LDS Church president ===
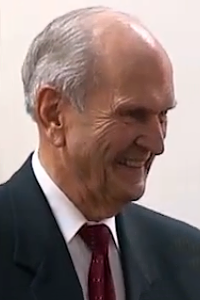
Nelson in 2012

With the death of Monson on January 2, 2018, Nelson became the anticipated successor to the church's presidency. Nelson signed 1,150 mission calls as the presiding apostle. After being ordained and set apart as church president on January 14, 2018, Nelson was introduced to church members and the media two days later, along with Oaks as his first counselor and Henry B. Eyring as second counselor. Nelson chose not to retain Dieter F. Uchtdorf, who had served as Monson's second counselor, in the new First Presidency. This marked the first time since 1985 that a new church president had not retained a previously-serving counselor.

On April 14, 2022, Nelson surpassed Gordon B. Hinckley to become the oldest president in the church's history. On August 8, 2022, Nelson became the church's oldest apostle ever, surpassing David B. Haight.

Nelson turned one hundred on September 9, 2024. The church commemorated his birthday with a globally broadcast livestream showcasing his life and church service.

==== Worldwide ministry ====
As president, Nelson visited dozens of countries, addressing thousands of church members.

His first trip—called a global ministry tour by the church—occurred in April 2018, when Nelson along with his wife, and Jeffrey R. Holland and his wife, met with Latter-day Saints in London, England; Jerusalem; Nairobi, Kenya; Harare, Zimbabwe; Bengaluru, India; Bangkok, Thailand; Hong Kong; and Laie, Hawaii.

In June 2018, Nelson traveled to Alberta, Canada, where his second wife was born and raised, and gave three devotional addresses in three consecutive evenings.

In September 2018, Nelson visited the Dominican Republic, where he gave an entire talk in Spanish, which was believed to be the first time a church president had given an extended talk in a formal setting in a language other than English. On the same trip, he visited Puerto Rico.

On February 10, 2019, Nelson spoke to church members in Arizona at State Farm Stadium in Glendale. In addition to the large crowd in attendance, the devotional was broadcast across the state.

On March 9, 2019, Nelson met with Pope Francis at the Vatican. The event marked the first time in history that a pope and a president of the church had met face-to-face. The meeting took place the day before the church's Rome Italy Temple was dedicated.

In August 2019, Nelson visited Guatemala, Colombia, Ecuador, Argentina, and Brazil.

==== Organizational and policy changes ====
The first few months of Nelson's leadership of the church saw many significant changes to church policy, although many had at least been heavily discussed before he became church president, and some were continuations of policies instituted by his predecessors. Nelson began his presidency two days after his ordination with a short broadcast to church members before holding a press conference. The broadcast ahead of the press conference was unprecedented and provided the new leaders an opportunity to briefly address the entire church immediately.

In March 2018, the First Presidency issued a letter on preventing and responding to abuse. This letter reiterated existing policies, but also explicitly stated that no one should ever be counseled against reporting abuse to legal authorities. The guidance also had a clear emphasis on using counseling to assist in healing from abuse. It also provided more clear policies mandating all interviews with women and youth be done with another person in the general area and made it clear that youth and women could have a parent or other adult present for an interview. It also adjusted previous policies forbidding adult males to teach classes of children or youth alone to apply to all adults.

During the church's April 2018 general conference, Nelson appointed Asian American Gerrit W. Gong and Brazilian Ulisses Soares to the Quorum of the Twelve Apostles, both of whom had been serving in the Presidency of the Seventy.

Nelson also introduced major changes in church organization during the April general conference. First, the high priests groups at the ward level were dissolved, making all Melchizedek priesthood holders in wards and branches part of the elders quorum. A stake's high priest quorum now consists of current members of stake presidencies, high councils, bishoprics and functioning patriarchs. Next, Nelson ended home teaching and visiting teaching, replacing the programs with a focus on ministering, and shifting both the focus and methods of tracking them. As part of this change, young women ages 14–18 may be assigned as ministering sisters, similar to the-long standing policies of young men ages 14–18 serving as home teachers.

June 2018 began with a First Presidency–sponsored celebration of the fortieth anniversary of the revelation extending priesthood and temple blessings to all worthy members without regard to race, in which Nelson gave concluding remarks. A few days before this, Nelson and his counselors met with the national leaders of the NAACP. That same weekend Nelson gave a devotional to youth of the church, in which he urged them to more fully commit to the church. He encouraged them to collectively choose a period of seven days in which to abstain from the use of social media. On June 18, the First Presidency created committees assigned to form a unified hymnbook and children's songbook for the worldwide church membership, with each language edition having the same hymns (and other songs) in the same order, and that these committees would be taking submissions and collecting surveys until July 2019. It is anticipated that the process of creating the new unified hymnbook and children's songbook will take several years.

On June 29, 2018, the Come, Follow Me program was announced, changing the format for study curriculum to be "home-centered and church supported".

In August 2018, Nelson issued a statement urging the use of the church's full name. At the church's general conference in October 2018, he reiterated his position, declaring, "It is a correction" and "It is the command of the Lord." Nelson told members, "To remove the Lord’s name from the Lord’s Church is a major victory for Satan."

In the October 2018 general conference, Nelson announced the shortened length of Sunday church meetings to two hours, from the previous standard of three. At the end of the month, Nelson toured five South American countries, during which he met with Peru's president, Martín Vizcarra, gave a major address in Peru in Spanish, and dedicated the Concepción Chile Temple.

In December 2018, the First Presidency changed the process of youth class progression and priesthood ordination. Beginning in 2019, youth began moving between classes and priesthood quorums at the beginning of the year in which they turn twelve, fourteen, or sixteen, rather than when their birthday occurs during the year.

In April 2019, the First Presidency reversed a controversial November 2015 policy that classified same-sex couples as apostates and required parental and First Presidency approval before minor children of same-sex couples could be baptized or receive baby blessings. Nelson had previously characterized the 2015 policy as direction from God, stating that "each of us during that sacred moment felt a spiritual confirmation . . . It was our privilege as apostles to sustain what had been revealed to President Monson." Shortly after the change, Nelson said in a press release that the reversal was, "revelation upon revelation" and intended to "help affected families" and "reduce the hate and contention so common today."

On April 5, 2020, Nelson announced a new proclamation from the First Presidency and the Quorum of the Twelve, "The Restoration of the Fulness of the Gospel of Jesus Christ: A Bicentennial Proclamation to the World". The proclamation coincided with the 200th anniversary of Joseph Smith's First Vision and is the sixth proclamation issued by the church in its history.

==== Temples ====
Nelson's tenure as church president saw an increased focus on worship in the church's temples. As of April 2025, Nelson had announced a total of 200 new temples to be built in many countries around the world. His travels included several temple dedications, most notably the Rome Italy Temple in March 2019, which was attended by all current members of the First Presidency and Quorum of the Twelve Apostles.

In 2018, Nelson announced nineteen new temples, seven in April and twelve in October, among which were the first in India, Nicaragua, Russia, and Cambodia. During his April 2018 visit to India, Nelson stated to church members that the Lord had instructed him to announce the temple the night before general conference, though he had not originally planned to do so. With the temple in Nicaragua, Nelson fulfilled an apostolic promise he had made to church members there six years earlier.

In October 2018, Nelson concluded a ten-day trip to South America by dedicating the Concepcion Chile Temple. Following the December 2018 dedication of the Barranquilla Colombia Temple by Dallin H. Oaks, Nelson presided over the three-day dedicatory services for the Rome Italy Temple from March 10 to 12, 2019. Nelson took all the church's apostles with him to Rome for that dedication. This was the first time all ordained apostles of the church had been gathered in one location outside the United States. While in Rome, the First Presidency and Quorum of the Twelve Apostles took the first apostolic group photo in two decades.

In April 2020, Nelson announced plans to build a temple in Shanghai, China. Days later, the Shanghai Municipal Ethnic and Religious Affairs Bureau responded saying it "knew nothing about the American Mormon Church . . . building a so-called 'temple' in Shanghai." The bureau added that the church's plans were "wishful thinking, not based in reality."

== Personal life and death ==
While a student at the University of Utah, Nelson met and began dating fellow Utah student Dantzel White (1926–2005). They dated for three years, then married on August 31, 1945, in the Salt Lake Temple. Together they had ten children: nine daughters—Marsha, Wendy (1951–2019), Gloria, Brenda, Sylvia, Emily (1958–1995), Laurie, Rosalie, and Marjorie—and a son, Russell Jr. (b. 1972). Dantzel White was a native of Perry, Utah, and first met Nelson when they were the co-leads in a musical produced at the University of Utah. During the 1950s, Dantzel was a member of the Tabernacle Choir.

Dantzel Nelson died unexpectedly at their home in Salt Lake City on February 12, 2005, at age seventy-eight. The following year, Nelson married Wendy L. Watson (b. 1950) in the Salt Lake Temple on April 6, 2006. Watson, originally from Raymond, Alberta, was a professor of marriage and family therapy at BYU prior to her retirement in 2006. Her marriage to Nelson was her first.

On September 26, 2025, The Salt Lake Tribune reported that earlier in September, during a stake conference in northern Kentucky, Quorum of the Twelve Apostles member Quentin L. Cook told members that Nelson had lost sight in both eyes.

Nelson died at the age of 101 on September 27, 2025, at his home in Salt Lake City, Utah, at 10:00 p.m. At the time of his death, he was with his wife, Wendy Nelson. Additionally, the counselors in the First Presidency, Dallin H. Oaks and Henry B. Eyring, visited him during his final days. All of his living children and their spouses were also present.

Before the funeral, a public viewing was held on October 6, 2025, at the Conference Center in Salt Lake City. The funeral took place the following day, October 7, 2025, also at the Conference Center. Afterwards, he was buried at the Salt Lake City Cemetery next to his first wife, Dantzel Nelson.

== Positions and awards ==
- President of the Thoracic Surgical Directors Association
- President of the Society for Vascular Surgery (1975)
- President of the Utah State Medical Association
- Director of the American Board of Thoracic Surgery
- Chairman of the Council on Cardiovascular Surgery for the American Heart Association
- Chairman of the Division of Thoracic Surgery at the LDS Hospital
- Vice-chairman of the board of governors at the LDS Hospital
- "Citation for International Service", American Heart Association
- "Heart of Gold Award", American Heart Association
- "Golden Plate Award", American Academy of Achievement
- "Distinguished Alumni Award", University of Utah
- "Surgical Alumnus of the Year Award", University of Minnesota Medical School
- "Governor's Medal of Science: Lifetime Achievement Award", Utah Technology Innovation Summit
- "Advocate of the Arts" award presented by the Inspirational Arts Association.
- "2023 Gandhi-King-Mandela Peace Prize", Morehouse College

In June 2018, the University of Utah endowed a chair in cardiothoracic surgery named after Nelson and his first wife, Dantzel.

== Honorary degrees and titles ==
Date	School	Degree or Title
1970	Brigham Young University	Doctor of Science
1985	Shandong Medical College	Honorary Professor
1989	Utah State University	Doctor of Medical Science
1994	Snow College	Doctor of Humane Letters
2021	University of Utah	Doctor of Science

== Selected works ==
Publications

- Nelson, Russell M. (1979). From Heart to Heart: An Autobiography. Nelson. OCLC 6144971.
- —— (1987). Motherhood. Deseret Book. ISBN 978-0-87579-087-9. OCLC 20469710.
- —— (1988). The Power Within Us. Deseret Book. ISBN 978-0-87579-154-8. OCLC 18164244.
- —— (1993). Lessons from Mother Eve: A Mother's Day Message. Deseret Book. ISBN 978-0-87579-734-2. OCLC 32969712.
- —— (1995). The Gateway We Call Death. Deseret Book. ISBN 978-0-87579-953-7. OCLC 31901270.
- —— (1998). The Magnificence of Man and Truth--and More. Deseret Book. ISBN 978-0-87579-985-8. OCLC 40197958.
- —— (1998). Perfection Pending: And Other Favorite Discourses. Deseret Book. ISBN 978-1-57345-405-6. OCLC 39256877.
- —— (2009). "Hope in Our Hearts". The Hastings Center Report. 24 (1). Deseret Book: 2–3. ISBN 978-1-60641-201-5. OCLC 426253825. PMID 8045763.
- —— (2010). Wise Men and Women Still Adore Him. Deseret Book. ISBN 978-1-60641-835-2. OCLC 672405152.
- —— (2015). Accomplishing the Impossible: What God Does, What We Can Do. Deseret Book. ISBN 978-1-62972-125-5. OCLC 1629721255.

Speeches

- —— (1974). "Four Lessons from One Life". BYU Speeches.
- —— (1980). "What's in a Name?". BYU Speeches.
- —— (1984). "Begin with the End in Mind". BYU Speeches.
- —— (1985). "Truth ... and More". BYU Speeches.
- —— (1986). "I'll Go, I'll Do, I'll Be: Three Steps Toward a Monumental Life". BYU Speeches.
- —— (1987). "The Magnificence of Man". BYU Speeches.
- —— (1988). "Thanks for the Covenant". BYU Speeches.
- —— (1990). "Reflection and Resolution". BYU Speeches.
- —— (1991). "Standards of Standard-Bearers of the Lord". BYU Speeches.
- —— (1992). "Jesus the Christ—Our Advocate and More". BYU Speeches.
- —— (1993). "Integrity of Heart". BYU Speeches.
- —— (1995). "'A More Excellent Hope'". BYU Speeches.
- —— (1997). "The Exodus Repeated". BYU Speeches.
- —— (1998). "Gratitude for the Mission and Ministry of Jesus Christ". BYU Speeches.
- —— (2000). "Identity, Priority, and Blessings". BYU Speeches.
- —— (2002). "Christ the Savior Is Born". BYU Speeches.
- —— (2005). "Faith and Families". BYU Speeches.
- —— (2008). "Power and Protection Provided by Worthy Music". BYU Speeches.
- —— (2009). "'Neither Trust in the Arm of Flesh'". BYU Speeches.
- —— (2014). "Disciples of Jesus Christ—Defenders of Marriage". BYU Speeches.
- —— (2015). "To Do and to Be". BYU Speeches.
- —— (2019). "The Love and Laws of God". BYU Speeches.

== See also ==
- Council on the Disposition of the Tithes – LDS Church financial leadership council
- Michael T. Ringwood – son-in-law and LDS Church general authority

== Notes ==
The Church of Jesus Christ of Latter-day Saints titles
Preceded by Thomas S. Monson	President of the Church; January 14, 2018 – September 27, 2025	Succeeded by Dallin H. Oaks
Preceded by Boyd K. Packer	President of the Quorum of the Twelve Apostles; July 3, 2015 – January 14, 2018	Succeeded by Dallin H. Oaks
Preceded by Neal A. Maxwell	Quorum of the Twelve Apostles; April 12, 1984 – January 14, 2018	Succeeded by Dallin H. Oaks
