= Journal of Family Nursing =

- Discipline: Nursing
- Language: English
- Edited by: Janice M. Bell

Publication details
- History: 1995-present
- Publisher: SAGE Publications
- Frequency: Quarterly
- Impact factor: 1.955 (2017)

Standard abbreviations
- ISO 4: J. Fam. Nurs.

Indexing
- ISSN: 1074-8407 (print); 1552-549X (web)
- LCCN: 95657565
- OCLC no.: 29859620

Links
- Journal homepage; Online access; Online archive

The Journal of Family Nursing is a quarterly peer-reviewed medical journal covering the field of family nursing. The editor-in-chief is Janice M. Bell (University of Calgary) and is published by SAGE Publications. It was established in 1995.

== Abstracting and indexing ==
The journal is abstracted and indexed in Scopus and the Science Citation Index Expanded. According to the Journal Citation Reports, the journal has a 2017 impact factor of 1.955.
