= Pete Hurt =

American football player and coach (born 1956)

Biographical details
- Born: September 22, 1956 (age 70); Cleveland, Mississippi, U.S.
- Died: July 11, 2026; Dominican Republic

Playing career
- 1974–1977: Mississippi College

Coaching career (HC unless noted)
- 1978–1979: Clinton HS (MS) (DC)
- 1980–1981: Clinton HS (MS) (OC)
- 1981–1982: North Texas (RB)
- 1982–1983: Southeast Missouri State (LB)
- 1983–1986: Baylor (AOC)
- 1987–1989: Lamar (DC)
- 1990–1991: Rice (LB)
- 1991–1992: Birmingham Fire (DL)
- 1993: Samford (DC)
- 1994–2001: Samford
- 2002–2004: Clinton HS (MS)
- 2005–2006: Air Force (OL)
- 2007–2010: Center Hill HS (MS)
- 2011–2013: Northwest Rankin HS (MS)
- 2014–2015: Georgia Tech (DPP)
- 2016: Olive Branch HS (MS)

Head coaching record
- Overall: 42–39–1 (college)

Pete Hurt (born September 22, 1956) is an American football coach. He served as the head football coach at Samford University in Homewood, Alabama from 1994 to 2001, compiling a record of 42–39–1. Hurt has also been the head football coach at a number of high school in the state of Mississippi: Clinton High School from 2002 to 2004, Center High School from 2007 to 2010, Northwest Rankin High School from 2011 to 2013, and Olive Branch High School in 2016.

== Coaching career ==
After he graduated from Mississippi College, in 1978 Hurt began his coaching career. After he served as an assistant coach at Clinton High School from 1978 through 1981, Hurt landed his first college assistant position with North Texas for the 1981 season. Between 1981 and 1991, Hurt served as an assistant at Southeast Missouri State, Baylor, Lamar and Rice. In 1992, Hunt joined the staff of the Birmingham Fire of the World League of American Football where he served as defensive line coach for both seasons the team was in existence. After the Fire folded, Hurt accepted an assistant coaching position at Nicholls State before quickly resigning to take the defensive coordinator position at Samford University under former Fire head coach Chan Gailey.

After a single season as defensive coordinator, Hurt was promoted to head coach for the 1994 season after Gailey left to take an assistant coaching position in the National Football League (NFL). Hurt was fired midseason during the 2001 campaign after a 1–4 start. During his eight seasons with the Bulldogs, Hurt led Samford to an overall record of 42–39–1.

From Samford, Hurt returned to serve as head coach at Clinton High School for three years before he became the offensive line coach at Air Force. After two years with the Falcons, Hunt returned to Mississippi to serve as head coach at Center Hill High School from 2007 through 2010 when he resigned to serve as head coach at Northwest Rankin High School. In December 2013 Hurt resigned from Northwest Rankin High School position of head football coach and athletic director after two losing seasons. His successor, Tyler Peterson, was named weeks later. Hurt coached one season with Olive Branch and was later dismissed.

== Head coaching record ==
=== College ===
Year	Team	Overall	Conference	Standing	Bowl/playoffs
Samford Bulldogs (NCAA Division I-AA independent) (1994–2001)
1994	Samford	4–6–1			
1995	Samford	7–4			
1996	Samford	6–5			
1997	Samford	7–4			
1998	Samford	6–5			
1999	Samford	7–4			
2000	Samford	4–7			
2001	Samford	1–4			
Samford:		42–39–1			
Total:		42–39–1			

== Notes ==
- Hurt was fired after the Bulldogs lost to Alcorn State to open the 2001 season 1–4. He was replaced by Bill Gray who finished the season with an overall record of 4–1.
