= 2001 The Citadel Bulldogs football team =

American college football season

2001 The Citadel Bulldogs football
- Conference: Southern Conference
- Record: 3–7 (2–6 SoCon)
- Head coach: Ellis Johnson (1st season)
- Offensive coordinator: Jeff Fela (1st season)
- Defensive coordinator: Les Herrin (1st season)
- Home stadium: Johnson Hagood Stadium

2001 Southern Conference football standings
	Conf.			Overall
Team	W		L	W		L
No. 2 Furman $^	7	–	1	12	–	3
No. 3 Georgia Southern $^	7	–	1	12	–	2
No. 6 Appalachian State ^	6	–	2	9	–	4
Western Carolina	5	–	3	7	–	4
East Tennessee State	4	–	4	6	–	5
Wofford	3	–	5	4	–	7
The Citadel	2	–	6	3	–	7
Chattanooga	1	–	7	3	–	8
VMI	1	–	7	1	–	10
$ – Conference champion; ^ – NCAA Division I-AA playoff participant; Rankings from The Sports Network I-AA Poll

The 2001 The Citadel Bulldogs football team represented The Citadel, The Military College of South Carolina in the 2001 NCAA Division I-AA football season. Ellis Johnson served as head coach for the first season. The Bulldogs played as members of the Southern Conference and played home games at Johnson Hagood Stadium.

== Schedule ==
The Bulldogs game against Western Carolina was rescheduled from September 15 to November 17 due to the September 11, 2001 attacks.

Date	Time	Opponent	Site	Result	Attendance	Source
September 1	6:00 pm	at No. 11 (I-A) Georgia Tech*	Bobby Dodd Stadium; Atlanta, GA	L 7–35	41,804	
September 22	4:00 pm	No. 5 Appalachian State	Johnson Hagood Stadium; Charleston, SC	L 6–8	15,107	
September 29	4:00 pm	South Carolina State*	Johnson Hagood Stadium; Charleston, SC	W 31–8	15,180	
October 4	7:00 pm	at East Tennessee State	Memorial Center; Johnson City, TN	L 21–23	4,769	
October 13	2:00 pm	No. 3 Furman	Johnson Hagood Stadium; Charleston, SC (rivalry)	L 7–31	16,982	
October 20	1:00 pm	at No. 1 Georgia Southern	Paulson Stadium; Statesboro, GA	L 6–14	18,637	
October 27	2:00 pm	Wofford	Johnson Hagood Stadium; Charleston, SC (rivalry)	L 0–13	12,127	
November 3	7:00 pm	at Chattanooga	Finley Stadium; Chattanooga, TN	W 20–17 ^{2OT}	8,945	
November 10	2:00 pm	VMI^{†}	Johnson Hagood Stadium; Charleston, SC (Military Classic of the South)	W 49–7	18,937	
November 17	2:00 pm	at Western Carolina	E. J. Whitmire Stadium; Cullowhee, NC	L 25–28	7,496	
*Non-conference game; ^{†}Homecoming; Rankings from The Sports Network Poll released prior to the game; All times are in Eastern time
