= Donnie Kirkpatrick =

American football player and coach (born 1959)

Biographical details
- Born: October 24, 1959 (age 67)

Playing career
- 1978–1981: Lenoir–Rhyne
- Positions: Quarterback, wide receiver

Coaching career (HC unless noted)
- 1984–1988: Appalachian State (GA)
- 1989–1992: South Carolina (QB)
- 1993: Eastern Michigan (WR)
- 1994: Eastern Michigan (AHC/QB/RB)
- 1995–1996: Louisville (QB)
- 1997: Louisville (OC/QB)
- 1998–1999: Chattanooga (OC)
- 2000–2002: Chattanooga
- 2003–2004: Western Carolina (WR)
- 2005–2014: East Carolina (WR)
- 2015: East Carolina (AHC/WR)
- 2016–2018: James Madison (OC/QB)
- 2019–2023: East Carolina (OC/QB)

Head coaching record
- Overall: 10–24

Donnie Kirkpatrick (born October 24, 1959) is an American football coach. He was formerly the offensive coordinator and quarterbacks coach at East Carolina University. He served two stints at East Carolina, having served as the wide receivers coach at ECU from 2005 to 2015 and then the offensive coordinator and quarterbacks coach from 2019 to 2023. Kirkpatrick served as head football coach at the University of Tennessee at Chattanooga for three seasons, from 2000 to 2002. His coaching career has also included stops at Appalachian State, South Carolina, Eastern Michigan, Louisville, Western Carolina, and James Madison.

== Playing career ==
Kirkpatrick played quarterback for his father, Don Kirkpatrick, at South Caldwell High School in Hudson, North Carolina. He led the South Caldwell football team to a North Carolina 3A state runner-up finish his senior year in 1977.

A native of Granite Falls, North Carolina, Kirkpatrick attended nearby Lenoir-Rhyne, where he was a four-year letterwinner on the football team from 1978 to 1981. He played quarterback for three years and wide receiver for one. He was also a letterwinner in tennis for the Bears.

== Coaching career ==
=== Appalachian State ===
From 1984 to 1988, Kirkpatrick served as a graduate assistant for Appalachian State where he worked with the quarterbacks, running backs, and defensive ends. During his time in Boone, North Carolina, Kirkpatrick was a part of two SoCon championships in 1986 and in 1987.

=== South Carolina ===
In 1989, Kirkpatrick joined Sparky Woods' staff at South Carolina as the quarterbacks coach and recruiting coordinator. He was there through the 1992 season and coached Todd Ellis and Bobby Fuller.

=== Eastern Michigan ===
In 1993 and 1994, Kirkpatrick was on Ron Cooper’s staff at Eastern Michigan. In 1993, he coached the wide receivers, before being promoted to assistant head coach, and coaching the quarterbacks and running backs. Here, he coached Charlie Batch, who became a second round selection in the NFL draft.

=== Louisville ===
In 1995, Kirkpatrick followed Cooper to Louisville as the offensive coordinator and quarterbacks coach. He was directly responsible for developing quarterback Chris Redman into a third round NFL selection.

=== Chattanooga ===
Following his stint at Louisville, Kirkpatrick moved to Chattanooga. In 1998, he was a volunteer assistant, working with the defensive backs. The following year, he became the offensive coordinator. After an offensive record-setting year, Kirkpatrick was promoted to head coach.

In Kirkpatrick's first season at the helm, the team was 5–6 and 3–5 in conference play. In his second year, the team was 3–8, and 1–7 in the conference. In his third and final year, Kirkpatrick's team was 4–8, and 2–6 within the conference.

With two games remaining in the 2002 season, Chattanooga announced that they would be reassigning Kirkpatrick at the conclusion of the season, and would hire a new football coach.

=== Western Carolina ===
Instead of being reassigned, Kirkpatrick left to take a job at Western Carolina. He was the wide receivers coach for the 2003 and 2004 seasons.

=== East Carolina (first stint) ===
From 2005 through 2015, Kirkpatrick coached the East Carolina wide receivers. He coached three players that would be drafted to play in the NFL. They were: Justin Hardy, Dwayne Harris, and Aundrae Allison.

=== James Madison ===
From 2016 to 2018, Kirkpatrick served as the offensive coordinator on Mike Houston’s staff at James Madison. James Madison won the 2016 FCS National Championship.

=== East Carolina (second stint) ===
When Mike Houston became the head coach of the East Carolina Pirates football team in December 2018, he announced that many of his staff members at James Madison would be coming with him, including Donnie Kirkpatrick. Following the 2023 campaign, Kirkpatrick agreed to part ways with the team at the conclusion of the season. He served a total of two stints and 16 years with East Carolina.

== Personal life ==
Kirkpatrick and his wife, Misty (McReery), have two children: a daughter, Molly, and a son, Davis. Davis was a pitcher on the East Carolina Pirates baseball team from 2014 to 2018.

== Head coaching record ==
Year	Team	Overall	Conference	Standing	Bowl/playoffs
Chattanooga Mocs (Southern Conference) (2000–2002)
2000	Chattanooga	5–6	3–5	T–6th	
2001	Chattanooga	3–8	1–7	T–8th	
2002	Chattanooga	2–10	2–6	T–7th	
Chattanooga:		10–24	6–18		
Total:		10–24			
