= Paul Hamilton (American football) =

American football player and coach (born 1958)

Biographical details
- Born: May 28, 1958 (age 68)

Playing career
- 1978–1980: Appalachian State
- Position: Quarterback

Coaching career (HC unless noted)
- 1981: The Citadel (WR)
- 1983: East Tennessee State (WR)
- 1984–1987: East Tennessee State (QB)
- 1988–1989: Wofford (OC/QB)
- 1990–1996: Air Force (OC/WR)
- 1997–2003: East Tennessee State
- 2004–2005: Elon
- 2007–2016: Brevard
- 2017–2018: Georgia Tech (assoc. DPP / OA)
- 2019–2021: Kentucky State (assistant)
- 2022: Kentucky State (interim HC)

Head coaching record
- Overall: 68–142

Paul Hamilton (born May 28, 1958) is an American college football coach and former player. He was the interim head football coach at Kentucky State University for the 2022 season. Hamilton served as the head football coach at East Tennessee State University from 1997 to 2003, at Elon University from 2004 to 2005, and at Brevard College from 2007 to 2016. He played college football as a quarterback at Appalachian State University from 1978 to 1980.

== Personal life ==
Hamilton's son-in-law is former Major League Baseball pitcher Asher Wojciechowski.

== Head coaching record ==
Year	Team	Overall	Conference	Standing	Bowl/playoffs
East Tennessee State Buccaneers (Southern Conference) (1997–2003)
1997	East Tennessee State	7–4	5–3	T–3rd	
1998	East Tennessee State	4–7	3–5	T–6th	
1999	East Tennessee State	6–5	4–4	5th	
2000	East Tennessee State	6–5	4–4	5th	
2001	East Tennessee State	6–5	4–4	5th	
2002	East Tennessee State	4–8	2–6	T–7th	
2003	East Tennessee State	5–7	2–6	8th	
East Tennessee State:		38–41	24–32		
Elon Phoenix (Southern Conference) (2004–2005)
2004	Elon	3–8	2–5	T–5th	
2005	Elon	3–8	0–7	8th	
Elon:		6–14	2–12		
Brevard Tornadoes (South Atlantic Conference) (2007–2016)
2007	Brevard	2–9	0–0	NA	
2008	Brevard	1–9	0–7	8th	
2009	Brevard	7–4	3–4	5th	
2010	Brevard	4–7	1–6	8th	
2011	Brevard	3–8	1–6	8th	
2012	Brevard	2–9	1–6	T–7th	
2013	Brevard	3–8	2–5	T–7th	
2014	Brevard	1–10	0–7	8th	
2015	Brevard	0–11	0–7	8th	
2016	Brevard	1–10	0–7	8th	
Brevard:		24–75	8–55		
Kentucky State Thorobreds (Southern Intercollegiate Athletic Conference) (2022)
2022	Kentucky State	4–6	4–3	3rd	
Kentucky State:		4–6	4–3		
Total:		72–148			
