= 2001 Western Carolina Catamounts football team =

American college football season

2001 Western Carolina Catamounts football
- Conference: Southern Conference
- Record: 7–4 (5–3 SoCon)
- Head coach: Bill Bleil (5th season)
- Home stadium: E. J. Whitmire Stadium

2001 Southern Conference football standings
	Conf.			Overall
Team	W		L	W		L
No. 2 Furman $^	7	–	1	12	–	3
No. 3 Georgia Southern $^	7	–	1	12	–	2
No. 6 Appalachian State ^	6	–	2	9	–	4
Western Carolina	5	–	3	7	–	4
East Tennessee State	4	–	4	6	–	5
Wofford	3	–	5	4	–	7
The Citadel	2	–	6	3	–	7
Chattanooga	1	–	7	3	–	8
VMI	1	–	7	1	–	10
$ – Conference champion; ^ – NCAA Division I-AA playoff participant; Rankings from The Sports Network I-AA Poll

The 2001 Western Carolina Catamounts team was an American football team that represented Western Carolina University as a member of the Southern Conference (SoCon) during the 2001 NCAA Division I-AA football season. In their fifth year under head coach Bill Bleil, the team compiled an overall record of 7–4, with a mark of 5–3 in conference play, and finished fourth in the SoCon.

== Schedule ==
The Catamounts game against The Citadel was rescheduled from September 15 to November 17 due to the September 11, 2001 attacks.

Date	Time	Opponent	Site	Result	Attendance	Source
August 30	7:00 p.m.	Mars Hill*	E. J. Whitmire Stadium; Cullowhee, NC	W 15–6	7,214	
September 8	7:00 p.m.	at Louisville*	Papa John's Cardinal Stadium; Louisville, KY	L 7–31	35,214	
September 22	6:00 p.m.	at East Tennessee State	Memorial Center; Johnson City, TN	W 20–6	5,852	
September 29	6:00 p.m.	No. 4 Furman	E. J. Whitmire Stadium; Cullowhee, NC	L 13–31	8,714	
October 6	1:00 p.m.	at No. 1 Georgia Southern	Paulson Stadium; Statesboro, GA	L 14–50	17,804	
October 13	6:00 p.m.	Wofford	E. J. Whitmire Stadium; Cullowhee, NC	W 31–28	5,020	
October 18	7:00 p.m.	at Chattanooga	Finley Stadium; Chattanooga, TN	W 21–3	4,821	
October 27	2:00 p.m.	VMI	E. J. Whitmire Stadium; Cullowhee, NC	W 44–17	7,149	
November 3	2:00 p.m.	Liberty*	E. J. Whitmire Stadium; Cullowhee, NC	W 63–0	7,577	
November 10	2:00 p.m.	at No. 9 Appalachian State	Kidd Brewer Stadium; Boone, NC (rivalry)	L 24–34	17,779	
November 17	2:00 p.m.	The Citadel	E. J. Whitmire Stadium; Cullowhee, NC	W 28–25	7,496	
*Non-conference game; Rankings from The Sports Network Poll released prior to the game; All times are in Eastern time
