= 2001 Sacred Heart Pioneers football team =

American college football season

2001 Sacred Heart Pioneers football

NEC champion ECAC Bowl champion

ECAC Bowl, W 31–15 vs. Duquesne
- Conference: Northeast Conference
- Record: 11–0 (8–0 NEC)
- Head coach: Jim Fleming (2nd season)
- Offensive coordinator: Bill Lacey (2nd season)
- Defensive coordinator: Mark Nofri (2nd season)
- Home stadium: Campus Field

2001 Northeast Conference football standings
	Conf.			Overall
Team	W		L	W		L
Sacred Heart $	8	–	0	11	–	0
Robert Morris	6	–	1	6	–	3
Albany	5	–	2	7	–	3
Monmouth	5	–	2	7	–	3
Stony Brook	3	–	5	3	–	6
Wagner	3	–	5	3	–	6
Central Connecticut State	2	–	5	2	–	7
St. John's	1	–	6	1	–	9
Saint Francis (PA)	0	–	7	0	–	10
$ – Conference champion

The 2001 Sacred Heart Pioneers football team was an American football team that represented Sacred Heart University of Fairfield, Connecticut as a member of the Northeast Conference (NEC) during the 2001 NCAA Division I-AA football season. In their second and final year under head coach Jim Fleming, the Pioneers compiled an 11–0 record (8–0 against NEC opponents), won the NEC championship, defeated Duquesne in the ECAC Bowl, and outscored opponents by a total of 450 to 167.

The team's statistical leaders included Marvin Royal with 1,043 net rushing yards and 108 points scored (18 touchdowns), Justin Holtfreter with 2,581 passing yards, Deveren Johnson with 1,157 receiving yards.

The team played its home games at Campus Field in Fairfield.

== Schedule ==
Date	Opponent	Site	Result	Attendance	Source
September 8	at Central Connecticut	New Britain, CT	W 41–21	2,178	
September 22	at Robert Morris	Moon Township, PA	W 44–31	936	
September 29	at Siena	Loudonville, NY	W 34–0	684	
October 6	St. John's	Campus Field; Fairfield, CT	W 30–14	1,867	
October 13	Stony Brook	Campus Field; Fairfield, CT	W 32–17	4,006	
October 20	at Albany	Albany, NY	W 32–17	4,726	
October 27	at Iona	New Rochelle, NY	W 49–7	1,180	
November 3	at Wagner	Staten Island, NY	W 45–24	3,088	
November 10	Saint Francis (PA)	Campus Field; Fairfield, CT	W 58–0	2,651	
November 17	Monmouth	Campus Field; Fairfield, CT	W 44–14	2,841	
December 1	at Duquesne	Rooney Field; Pittsburgh, PA (ECAC Bowl)	W 31–15	3,446	

== NFL draft ==
The following Pioneer was selected in the National Football League draft following the season.

Round	Pick	Player	Position	NFL team
6	208	Deveren Johnson	WR	Dallas Cowboys
