= Bill Gray (American football coach) =

American football and tennis coach

Biographical details
- Born: c. 1957 (age 68–69)
- Education: Mississippi College (1991)

Coaching career (HC unless noted)

Football
- 1994–2001: Samford (assistant)
- 2001–2006: Samford

Tennis
- 1991: Mississippi College

Head coaching record
- Overall: 27–33

Accomplishments and honors

Awards
- OVC Coach of the Year (2003)

Bill Gray (born c. 1957) is an American former football and tennis coach. He served as the full-time head football coach at Samford University from 2002 to 2006, after being named the interim head coach midway through the 2001 season.

Gray is a 1991 graduate of Mississippi College, where was the head tennis coach in the early 1990s.

== Head coaching record ==
=== Football ===
Year	Team	Overall	Conference	Standing	Bowl/playoffs
Samford Bulldogs (NCAA Division I-AA independent) (2001–2002)
2001	Samford	4–1 (Note: Pete Hurt served as head coach for the first five games of the 2001 season before. Gray was named interim head coach and led Samford for the final five games of the season. The Wildcats finished the year 5–5 overall.)			
2002	Samford	4–7			
Samford Bulldogs (Ohio Valley Conference) (2003–2006)
2003	Samford	7–4	5–3	T–3rd	
2004	Samford	4–7	3–5	T–6th	
2005	Samford	5–6	4–4	T–4th	
2006	Samford	3–8	1–7	8th	
Samford:		27–33	31–32		
Total:		27–33			
