= Bill Lacey =

Bill Lacey may refer to:

- Bill Lacey (American football) (born 1971), college football coach
- Bill Lacey (footballer) (1889–1969), Irish footballer
- William Lacey (born 1973), British conductor

== See also ==
- William Lacy (disambiguation)
- William Lacey Amy
