= 2001 NCAA Division I-AA Football Championship Game =

Postseason college football game between the Montana Grizzlies and the Furman Paladins

2001 NCAA Division I-AA Football Championship
- I-AA National Championship Game
Furman Paladins	Montana Grizzlies
(12–2)	(14–1)
SoCon	Big Sky
6	13
Head coach: Bobby Johnson	Head coach: Joe Glenn
TSN / Seed; 4 / 3	TSN / Seed; 1 / 1
	1	2	3	4	Total
Furman	0	0	0	6	6
Montana	0	10	0	3	13
- Date: December 21, 2001
- Season: 2001
- Stadium: Finley Stadium
- Location: Chattanooga, Tennessee
- Referee: Ross Smith (Southland)
- Attendance: 12,698

United States TV coverage
- Network: ESPN
- Announcers: Ron Franklin (play-by-play), Mike Gottfried (color)

The 2001 NCAA Division I-AA Football Championship Game was a postseason college football game between the Montana Grizzlies and the Furman Paladins. The game was played on December 21, 2001, at Finley Stadium, home field of the University of Tennessee at Chattanooga. The culminating game of the 2001 NCAA Division I-AA football season, it was won by Montana, 13–6.

== Teams ==
The participants of the Championship Game were the finalists of the 2001 I-AA Playoffs, which began with a 16-team bracket. In a change from recent postseasons, the NCAA seeded only the top four seeds, while placing other teams in the bracket based on geographical considerations in order to minimize travel.

=== Montana Grizzlies ===
Montana finished their regular season with an 11–1 record (7–0 in conference); their only loss was to Hawaii of Division I-A. Seeded first in the playoffs, the Grizzlies defeated Northwestern State, Sam Houston State, and Northern Iowa to reach the final. This was the fourth appearance for Montana in a Division I-AA championship game, having won in 1995, and having lost in 1996 and 2000.

=== Furman Paladins ===
Furman finished their regular season with a 9–2 record (7–1 in conference); one of their losses was to Wyoming of Division I-A. The Paladins, seeded third, defeated Western Kentucky, Lehigh, and second-seed Georgia Southern to reach the final. This was the third appearance for Furman in a Division I-AA championship game, having won in 1988 and having lost in 1985.

== Game summary ==
=== Scoring summary ===
Scoring summary

Quarter	Time	Drive			Team	Scoring information	Score	
Quarter	Time	Plays	Yards	TOP	Team	Scoring information	FUR	MONT
2	6:27	16	99	6:49	MONT	Yohance Humphery 2-yard touchdown run, Chris Snyder kick good	0	7
2	0:53				MONT	35-yard field goal by Snyder	0	10
4	6:12			6:14	MONT	30-yard field goal by Snyder	0	13
4	0:00				FUR	James Thomas 54-yard touchdown reception from Billy Napier, kick none†	6	13
"TOP" = time of possession. For other American football terms, see Glossary of American football.							6	13

† When there is no time left on the clock at the end of the fourth quarter, NCAA rules only allow for a conversion attempt if it could affect the outcome of the game.

=== Game statistics ===
	1	2	3	4	Total
No. 3 Paladins	0	0	0	6	6
No. 1 Grizzlies	0	10	0	3	13

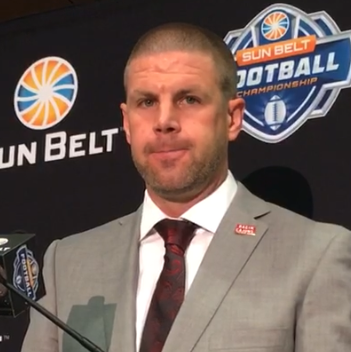
Furman quarterback Billy Napier, seen here in 2018

Statistics	FUR	MONT
First downs	14	16
Plays–yards	65–293	71–297
Rushes–yards	39–121	43–173
Passing yards	172	124
Passing: comp–att–int	10–26–2	18–28–0
Time of possession	28:09	31:51

Team	Category	Player	Statistics
Furman	Passing	Billy Napier	10–26, 172 yds 1 TD, 2 INT
Furman	Rushing	Eric Emerson	7 car, 34 yds
Furman	Receiving	James Thomas	4 rec, 75 yds, 1 TD
Montana	Passing	John Edwards	18–28, 124 yds
Montana	Rushing	Yohance Humphery	30 car, 142 yds, 1 TD
Montana	Receiving	Etu Molden	10 rec, 74 yds
