= 2001 Wofford Terriers football team =

American college football season

2001 Wofford Terriers football
- Conference: Southern Conference
- Record: 4–7 (3–5 SoCon)
- Head coach: Mike Ayers (14th season)
- Home stadium: Gibbs Stadium

2001 Southern Conference football standings
	Conf.			Overall
Team	W		L	W		L
No. 2 Furman $^	7	–	1	12	–	3
No. 3 Georgia Southern $^	7	–	1	12	–	2
No. 6 Appalachian State ^	6	–	2	9	–	4
Western Carolina	5	–	3	7	–	4
East Tennessee State	4	–	4	6	–	5
Wofford	3	–	5	4	–	7
The Citadel	2	–	6	3	–	7
Chattanooga	1	–	7	3	–	8
VMI	1	–	7	1	–	10
$ – Conference champion; ^ – NCAA Division I-AA playoff participant; Rankings from The Sports Network I-AA Poll

The 2001 Wofford Terriers football team was an American football team that represented Wofford College as a member of the Southern Conference (SoCon) during the 2001 NCAA Division I-AA football season. Led by 14th-year head coach Mike Ayers, the Terriers compiled and overall record of 4–7, with a mark of 3–5 in conference play, and finished sixth in the SoCon.

== Schedule ==
Date	Time	Opponent	Site	TV	Result	Attendance	Source
September 8	1:00 p.m.	at No. 20 (I-A) Clemson*	Memorial Stadium; Clemson, SC		L 14–38	79,156	
September 22	7:00 p.m.	Charleston Southern*	Gibbs Stadium; Spartanburg, SC		W 35–10	7,214	
September 29	7:00 p.m.	at Chattanooga	Finley Stadium; Chattanooga, TN		L 26–29	7,815	
October 6	1:30 p.m.	VMI	Gibbs Stadium; Spartanburg, SC		W 59–14	9,314	
October 13	6:00 p.m.	at Western Carolina	E. J. Whitmire Stadium; Cullowhee, NC		L 28–31	5,020	
October 20	6:00 p.m.	No. 12 Appalachian State	Gibbs Stadium; Spartanburg, SC		L 23–34	9,419	
October 27	2:00 p.m.	at The Citadel	Johnson Hagood Stadium; Charleston, SC (rivalry)		W 13–0	12,127	
November 3	1:00 p.m.	at No. 17 (I-A) South Carolina*	Williams–Brice Stadium; Columbia, SC		L 14–38	77,922	
November 10	3:30 p.m.	at No. 5 Furman	Paladin Stadium; Greenville, SC (rivalry)	CCSS	L 14–45	10,534	
November 17	1:30 p.m.	East Tennessee State	Gibbs Stadium; Spartanburg, SC		W 24–3	4,801	
November 24	1:00 p.m.	No. 2 Georgia Southern	Gibbs Stadium; Spartanburg, SC		L 10–48	6,685	
*Non-conference game; Rankings from The Sports Network Poll released prior to the game; All times are in Eastern time
