= 2001 Chattanooga Mocs football team =

American college football season

2001 Chattanooga Mocs football
- Conference: Southern Conference
- Record: 3–8 (1–7 SoCon)
- Head coach: Donnie Kirkpatrick (2nd season)
- Offensive coordinator: Donnie Kirkpatrick (4th season)
- Defensive coordinator: Will Holthouser (2nd season)
- Home stadium: Finley Stadium

2001 Southern Conference football standings
	Conf.			Overall
Team	W		L	W		L
No. 2 Furman $^	7	–	1	12	–	3
No. 3 Georgia Southern $^	7	–	1	12	–	2
No. 6 Appalachian State ^	6	–	2	9	–	4
Western Carolina	5	–	3	7	–	4
East Tennessee State	4	–	4	6	–	5
Wofford	3	–	5	4	–	7
The Citadel	2	–	6	3	–	7
Chattanooga	1	–	7	3	–	8
VMI	1	–	7	1	–	10
$ – Conference champion; ^ – NCAA Division I-AA playoff participant; Rankings from The Sports Network I-AA Poll

The 2001 Chattanooga Mocs football team represented the University of Tennessee at Chattanooga as a member of the Southern Conference (SoCon) in the 2001 NCAA Division I-AA football season. The Mocs were led by second-year head coach Donnie Kirkpatrick and played their home games at Finley Stadium. They finished the season 3–8 overall and 1–7 in SoConConference play to tie for eighth place.

== Schedule ==
Date	Time	Opponent	Site	Result	Attendance	Source
August 30	8:00 p.m.	at Samford*	Seibert Stadium; Homewood, AL	W 28–14	6,403	
September 8	8:00 p.m.	at Memphis*	Liberty Bowl Memorial Stadium; Memphis, TN	L 10–43	24,053	
September 22	1:00 p.m.	at No. 1 Georgia Southern	Paulson Stadium; Statesboro, GA	L 7–70	14,656	
September 29	7:00 p.m.	Wofford	Finley Stadium; Chattanooga, TN	W 29–26	7,815	
October 13	1:00 p.m.	at VMI	Alumni Memorial Field; Lexington, VA	L 16–19 ^{OT}	7,622	
October 18	7:00 p.m.	Western Carolina	Finley Stadium; Chattanooga, TN	L 3–21	4,821	
October 27	2:00 p.m.	at No. 12 Appalachian State	Kidd Brewer Stadium; Boone, NC	L 14–51	15,337	
November 3	1:30 p.m.	The Citadel^{†}	Finley Stadium; Chattanooga, TN	L 17–20 ^{2OT}	8,495	
November 10	2:00 p.m.	at East Tennessee State	Memorial Center; Johnson City, TN	L 10–32	8,748	
November 17	7:00 p.m.	No. 4 Furman	Finley Stadium; Chattanooga, TN	L 10–42	6,366	
November 24	1:00 p.m.	Kentucky State*	Finley Stadium; Chattanooga, TN	W 73–0	5,834	
*Non-conference game; ^{†}Homecoming; Rankings from The Sports Network Poll released prior to the game; All times are in Eastern time
