= Dave Jaumotte =

American football player and coach

Playing career
- 1981–1984: Purdue
- Position: Offensive tackle

Coaching career (HC unless noted)
- 1991: Detroit Lions (intern)
- 1992: Detroit Lions (offensive asst.)
- 1993–1994: Detroit Lions (TE)
- 1999–2001: Saint Francis (PA)

Head coaching record
- Overall: 2–30

Dave Jaumotte is an American former football player and coach. He served as the head football coach at Saint Francis University in Loretto, Pennsylvania from 1999 to 2001, compiling a record of 2–30. Prior to that, Jaumotte was an assistant coach in the Detroit Lions organization. He played college football at Purdue University.

== Head coaching record ==
Year	Team	Overall	Conference	Standing	Bowl/playoffs
Saint Francis Red Flash (Northeast Conference) (1999–2001)
1999	Saint Francis	2–9	1–6	7th	
2000	Saint Francis	0–11	0–8	9th	
2001	Saint Francis	0–10	0–7	9th	
Saint Francis:		2–30	1–21		
Total:		2–30			
