= William Lacy =

William Lacy or Bill Lacy could refer to:

- William Lacy (Catholic priest) (died 1582), English Catholic priest and martyr
- William Henry Lacy (1858-1925), American Methodist missionary to China
- William S. B. Lacy (1910-1978), American Diplomat
- Bill N. Lacy (born 1933), American academic
- William H. Lacy Jr. (1945-2016), American businessman
- Bill Lacy (political operative), Director of the Robert J. Dole Institute of Politics

== See also ==
- William Lacey (disambiguation)
- William Lacy Clay Sr. (born 1931), better known as Bill Clay, U.S. Congressman from Missouri
- William Lacy Clay Jr. (born 1956), better known as Lacy Clay, U.S. Congressman from Missouri and son of Bill Clay
