= 2001 Howard Bison football team =

American college football season

2001 Howard Bison football
- Conference: Mid-Eastern Athletic Conference
- Record: 2–9 (1–7 MEAC)
- Head coach: Steve Wilson (13th season)
- Home stadium: William H. Greene Stadium

2001 Mid-Eastern Athletic Conference football standings
	Conf.			Overall
Team	W		L	W		L
No. 22 Florida A&M $^	7	–	1	7	–	4
Hampton	6	–	2	7	–	4
North Carolina A&T	5	–	3	8	–	3
Bethune–Cookman	5	–	3	6	–	4
South Carolina State	5	–	3	6	–	5
Delaware State	3	–	5	5	–	6
Norfolk State	3	–	5	5	–	6
Howard	1	–	7	2	–	9
Morgan State	1	–	7	2	–	9
$ – Conference champion; ^ – NCAA Division I-AA playoff participant; Rankings from The Sports Network poll

The 2001 Howard Bison football team represented Howard University as a member of the Mid-Eastern Athletic Conference (MEAC) during the 2001 NCAA Division I-AA football season. Led by 13th-year head coach Steve Wilson, the Bison compiled an overall record of 2–9, with a conference record of 1–7, and finished tied for eighth in the MEAC.

== Schedule ==
Date	Opponent	Site	Result	Attendance	Source
September 1	vs. Jackson State*	Soldier Field; Chicago, IL (Walter Payton Classic)	L 17–27		
September 8	Hampton	William H. Greene Stadium; Washington, DC (rivalry)	L 20–27	11,869	
September 22	at Morgan State	Hughes Stadium; Baltimore, MD (rivalry)	W 41–15	14,262	
September 29	No. 18 Florida A&M	William H. Greene Stadium; Washington, DC	L 20–53	4,421	
October 6	vs. No. 22 Tennessee State*	RCA Dome; Indianapolis, IN (Circle City Classic)	L 0–45	51,060	
October 13	Benedict*	William H. Greene Stadium; Washington, DC	W 22–15		
October 20	at No. 23 North Carolina A&T	Aggie Stadium; Greensboro, NC	L 30–76	14,498	
October 27	at Norfolk State	William "Dick" Price Stadium; Norfolk, VA	L 0–7 ^{OT}	21,119	
November 3	South Carolina State	William H. Greene Stadium; Washington, DC	L 33–37		
November 10	Bethune–Cookman	William H. Greene Stadium; Washington, DC	L 18–29		
November 17	at Delaware State	Alumni Stadium; Dover, DE	L 31–43	2,787	
*Non-conference game; Rankings from The Sports Network Poll released prior to the game
