= 2001 Robert Morris Colonials football team =

American college football season

2001 Robert Morris Colonials football
- Conference: Northeast Conference
- Record: 6–3 (6–1 NEC)
- Head coach: Joe Walton (8th season)
- Defensive coordinator: Dan Radakovich (7th season)
- Home stadium: Moon Stadium

2001 Northeast Conference football standings
	Conf.			Overall
Team	W		L	W		L
Sacred Heart $	8	–	0	11	–	0
Robert Morris	6	–	1	6	–	3
Albany	5	–	2	7	–	3
Monmouth	5	–	2	7	–	3
Stony Brook	3	–	5	3	–	6
Wagner	3	–	5	3	–	6
Central Connecticut State	2	–	5	2	–	7
St. John's	1	–	6	1	–	9
Saint Francis (PA)	0	–	7	0	–	10
$ – Conference champion

The 2001 Robert Morris Colonials football team represented Robert Morris College, now Robert Morris University, as a member of the Northeast Conference (NEC) during the 2001 NCAA Division I-AA football season. The Colonials were led by 8th-year head coach Joe Walton and played their home games at Moon Stadium on the campus of Moon Area High School.

== Schedule ==
Date	Opponent	Site	Result	Attendance	Source
September 1	at Buffalo State*	Coyer Field; Buffalo, NY	L 27–33	1,723	
September 8	Dayton*	Moon Stadium; Moon Township, PA	L 9–37	1,329	
September 22	Sacred Heart	Moon Stadium; Moon Township, PA	L 31–44	936	
September 29	Saint Francis	Moon Stadium; Moon Township, PA	W 41–7	2,119	
October 13	at St. John's	DaSilva Stadium; New York, NY	W 28–0	614	
October 20	at Central Connecticut State	Arute Field; New Britain, CT	W 38–18	2,015	
October 27	Wagner	Moon Stadium; Moon Township, PA	W 49–30	1,114	
November 3	Stony Brook	Moon Stadium; Moon Township, PA	W 45–19	2,236	
November 10	at Albany	University Field; Albany, NY	W 42–31	1,769	
*Non-conference game
