= 2001 Texas Southern Tigers football team =

American college football season

2001 Texas Southern Tigers football
- Conference: Southwestern Athletic Conference
- West Division
- Record: 4–6 (3–4 SWAC)
- Head coach: William A. Thomas (8th season)
- Home stadium: Reliant Astrodome; Robertson Stadium

2001 Southwestern Athletic Conference football standings
	Conf.			Overall
Team	W		L	W		L
East Division
Alabama State xy	6	–	1	8	–	4
Jackson State	5	–	2	7	–	4
Alcorn State	5	–	2	6	–	5
Alabama A&M	3	–	4	4	–	7
Mississippi Valley State	0	–	7	0	–	11
West Division
No. 8 Grambling State xy$	6	–	1	10	–	1
Southern	5	–	2	7	–	4
Prairie View A&M	2	–	5	3	–	7
Texas Southern	2	–	5	3	–	7
Arkansas–Pine Bluff	1	–	6	4	–	7
Championship: Grambling State 38, Alabama State 31
$ – Conference champion; x – Division champion/co-champions; y – Championship game participant; Rankings from The Sports Network Poll

The 2001 Texas Southern Tigers football team represented Texas Southern University as a member of the Southwestern Athletic Conference (SWAC) during the 2001 NCAA Division I-AA football season. Led by eighth-year head coach William A. Thomas, the Tigers compiled an overall record of 4–6, with a mark of 3–4 in conference play, and finished tied for third in the West Division of the SWAC.

== Schedule ==
Date	Opponent	Site	Result	Attendance	Source
September 1	Prairie View A&M	Reliant Astrodome; Houston, TX (Labor Day Classic)	W 17–0		
September 8	at UTEP*	Sun Bowl; El Paso, TX	L 6–52	37,741	
September 22	at Alabama A&M	Louis Crews Stadium; Normal, AL	L 10–24		
September 29	vs. Langston*	Taft Stadium; Oklahoma City, OK	W 41–12		
October 6	at Arkansas–Pine Bluff	Golden Lion Stadium; Pine Bluff, AR	L 22–28		
October 13	Alabama State	Reliant Astrodome; Houston, TX	W 24–27 (forefit win)		
October 20	at Mississippi Valley State	Rice–Totten Stadium; Itta Bena, MS	W 38–21	6,083	
October 27	at No. 6 Grambling State	Eddie G. Robinson Memorial Stadium; Grambling, LA	L 3–43	22,736	
November 3	Morris Brown*	Robertson Stadium; Houston, TX	L 24–31		
November 10	Southern	Reliant Astrodome; Houston, TX	L 6–7		
*Non-conference game; Rankings from The Sports Network Poll released prior to the game
