= 2001 Mississippi Valley State Delta Devils football team =

American college football season

2001 Mississippi Valley State Delta Devils football
- Conference: Southwestern Athletic Conference
- East Division
- Record: 1–10 (0–7 SWAC)
- Head coach: LaTraia Jones (3rd season)
- Offensive coordinator: Willie Totten (2nd season)
- Home stadium: Rice–Totten Stadium

2001 Southwestern Athletic Conference football standings
| | Conf. | | | Overall |
| Team | W | | L | W | | L |
|---|---|---|---|---|---|---|
East Division
| Alabama State xy | 6 | – | 1 | 8 | – | 4 |
| Jackson State | 5 | – | 2 | 7 | – | 4 |
| Alcorn State | 5 | – | 2 | 6 | – | 5 |
| Alabama A&M | 3 | – | 4 | 4 | – | 7 |
| Mississippi Valley State | 0 | – | 7 | 0 | – | 11 |
West Division
| No. 8 Grambling State xy$ | 6 | – | 1 | 10 | – | 1 |
| Southern | 5 | – | 2 | 7 | – | 4 |
| Prairie View A&M | 2 | – | 5 | 3 | – | 7 |
| Texas Southern | 2 | – | 5 | 3 | – | 7 |
| Arkansas–Pine Bluff | 1 | – | 6 | 4 | – | 7 |
Championship: Grambling State 38, Alabama State 31
$ – Conference champion; x – Division champion/co-champions; y – Championship game participant; Rankings from The Sports Network Poll

The 2001 Mississippi Valley State Delta Devils football team represented Mississippi Valley State University as a member of the Southwestern Athletic Conference (SWAC) during the 2001 NCAA Division I-AA football season. Led by third-year head coach LaTraia Jones, the Delta Devils compiled an overall record of 1–10, with a conference record of 1–6, and finished fifth in the SWAC East Division.

== Schedule ==
| Date | Opponent | Site | Result | Attendance | Source |
|---|---|---|---|---|---|
| September 1 | at Arkansas–Pine Bluff | Golden Lion Stadium; Pine Bluff, AR | L 9–19 | | |
| September 8 | at Delta State* | McCool Stadium; Cleveland, MS | L 3–25 | | |
| September 22 | Jackson State | Rice–Totten Stadium; Itta Bena, MS | L 36–66 | | |
| September 29 | Sam Houston State* | Rice–Totten Stadium; Itta Bena, MS | L 13–68 | | |
| October 6 | at Prairie View A&M | Edward L. Blackshear Field; Prairie View, TX | L 17–34 | | |
| October 13 | at No. 18 Tennessee State* | Adelphia Coliseum; Nashville, TN | L 3–41 | | |
| October 20 | Texas Southern | Rice–Totten Stadium; Itta Bena, MS | L 21–38 | 6,083 | |
| October 27 | vs. Southern | Independence Stadium; Shreveport, LA (Port City Classic) | L 0–49 | | |
| November 3 | at Alcorn State | Jack Spinks Stadium; Lorman, MS | L 28–35 | | |
| November 17 | Alabama State | Rice–Totten Stadium; Itta Bena, MS | W 24–57 (forfeit win) | | |
| November 23 | Alabama A&M | Rice–Totten Stadium; Itta Bena, MS | L 22–40 | | |
*Non-conference game; Rankings from The Sports Networkf Poll released prior to the game
