= 2001 Liberty Flames football team =

American college football season

2001 Liberty Flames football
- Conference: Independent
- Record: 3–8
- Head coach: Ken Karcher (2nd season)
- Home stadium: Williams Stadium

2001 NCAA Division I-AA independents football standings
	Conf.			Overall
Team	W		L	W		L
Cal Poly		–		6	–	5
Saint Mary's		–		6	–	5
Samford		–		5	–	5
Charleston Southern		–		5	–	6
Morris Brown		–		5	–	6
Florida Atlantic		–		4	–	6
Cal State Northridge		–		3	–	7
Liberty		–		3	–	8
Savannah State		–		2	–	7
Elon		–		2	–	9
Southern Utah		–		2	–	9

The 2001 Liberty Flames football team represented Liberty University as an independent during the 2001 NCAA Division I-AA football season. Led by second-year head coach Ken Karcher, the Flames compiled a record of 3–8. Liberty played home games at Williams Stadium in Lynchburg, Virginia.

== Schedule ==
Date	Time	Opponent	Site	TV	Result	Attendance	Source
September 1	7:00 pm	at No. 5 Appalachian State*	Kidd Brewer Stadium; Boone, NC		L 26–46	10,331	
September 8	6:00 pm	at Eastern Kentucky*	Roy Kidd Stadium; Richmond, KY		L 7–30	12,300	
September 15		Furman*	Williams Stadium; Lynchburg, VA		Canceled		
September 22	3:30 pm	Delaware State*	Williams Stadium; Lynchburg, VA		W 34–7	8,353	
September 29	7:00 pm	Wingate*^{†}	Williams Stadium; Lynchburg, VA		W 41–13	10,887	
October 13	6:00 pm	at UCF*	Florida Citrus Bowl; Orlando, FL		L 0–63	17,103	
October 20	1:30 pm	at Gardner–Webb*	Ernest W. Spangler Stadium; Boiling Springs, NC		L 25–29	3,245	
October 27	7:00 pm	at South Florida*	Raymond James Stadium; Tampa, FL	FSNF	L 37–68	21,056	
November 3	2:00 pm	at Western Carolina*	Bob Waters Field at E. J. Whitmire Stadium; Cullowhee, NC		L 0–63	7,577	
November 10	1:30 pm	at Charleston Southern*	Buccaneer Field; Charleston, SC		W 45–31	1,816	
November 17	1:30 pm	No. 10 Hofstra*	Williams Stadium; Lynchburg, VA	MSG Network	L 3–40	7,437	
November 23	12:00 pm	James Madison*	Williams Stadium; Lynchburg, VA		L 7–14	2,647	
*Non-conference game; ^{†}Homecoming; Rankings from The Sports Network Poll released prior to the game; All times are in Eastern time
