= 2001 Norfolk State Spartans football team =

American college football season

2001 Norfolk State Spartans football
- Conference: Mid-Eastern Athletic Conference
- Record: 5–6 (3–5 MEAC)
- Head coach: Mo Forte (3rd season)
- Home stadium: William "Dick" Price Stadium

2001 Mid-Eastern Athletic Conference football standings
	Conf.			Overall
Team	W		L	W		L
No. 22 Florida A&M $^	7	–	1	7	–	4
Hampton	6	–	2	7	–	4
North Carolina A&T	5	–	3	8	–	3
Bethune–Cookman	5	–	3	6	–	4
South Carolina State	5	–	3	6	–	5
Delaware State	3	–	5	5	–	6
Norfolk State	3	–	5	5	–	6
Howard	1	–	7	2	–	9
Morgan State	1	–	7	2	–	9
$ – Conference champion; ^ – NCAA Division I-AA playoff participant; Rankings from The Sports Network poll

The 2001 Norfolk State Spartans football team represented Norfolk State University as a member of the Mid-Eastern Athletic Conference (MEAC) during the 2001 NCAA Division I-AA football season. Led by third-year head coach Mo Forte, the Spartans compiled an overall record of 5–6, with a conference record of 3–5, and finished tied for sixth in the MEAC.

== Schedule ==
Date	Opponent	Site	Result	Attendance	Source
September 1	Virginia State*	William "Dick" Price Stadium; Norfolk, VA	W 13–0	20,562	
September 22	Bethune–Cookman	William "Dick" Price Stadium; Norfolk, VA	L 7–32		
September 29	North Carolina A&T	William "Dick" Price Stadium; Norfolk, VA	L 0–43	11,023	
October 6	at Savannah State*	Ted Wright Stadium; Savannah, GA	W 27–18		
October 13	Hampton	William "Dick" Price Stadium; Norfolk, VA (rivalry)	W 28–20	18,972	
October 20	at No. 25 Florida A&M	Bragg Memorial Stadium; Tallahassee, FL	L 9–47	28,987	
October 27	Howard	William "Dick" Price Stadium; Norfolk, VA	W 7–0 ^{OT}	21,119	
November 4	at Morgan State	Hughes Stadium; Baltimore, MD	W 33–27	6,472	
November 10	vs. Delaware State	Qualcomm Stadium; San Diego, CA (Gold Coast Classic)	L 13–43		
November 17	at Morris Brown*	Herndon Stadium; Atlanta, GA	L 14–32	7,634	
November 24	at South Carolina State	Oliver C. Dawson Stadium; Orangeburg, SC	L 10–16		
*Non-conference game; Rankings from The Sports Network Poll released prior to the game
