= 2001 East Tennessee State Buccaneers football team =

American college football season

2001 East Tennessee State Buccaneers football
- Conference: Southern Conference
- Record: 6–5 (4–4 SoCon)
- Head coach: Paul Hamilton (5th season)
- Home stadium: Memorial Center

2001 Southern Conference football standings
	Conf.			Overall
Team	W		L	W		L
No. 2 Furman $^	7	–	1	12	–	3
No. 3 Georgia Southern $^	7	–	1	12	–	2
No. 6 Appalachian State ^	6	–	2	9	–	4
Western Carolina	5	–	3	7	–	4
East Tennessee State	4	–	4	6	–	5
Wofford	3	–	5	4	–	7
The Citadel	2	–	6	3	–	7
Chattanooga	1	–	7	3	–	8
VMI	1	–	7	1	–	10
$ – Conference champion; ^ – NCAA Division I-AA playoff participant; Rankings from The Sports Network I-AA Poll

The 2001 East Tennessee State Buccaneers football team was an American football team that represented East Tennessee State University as a member of the Southern Conference (SoCon) during the 2001 NCAA Division I-AA football season. Led by fifth-year head coach Paul Hamilton, the Buccaneers compiled and overall record of 6–5, with a mark of 4–4 in conference play, and finished fifth in the SoCon.

== Schedule ==
Date	Time	Opponent	Site	Result	Attendance	Source
September 1	6:00 p.m.	at Pittsburgh*	Heinz Field; Pittsburgh, PA	L 0–31	47,919	
September 8	6:00 p.m.	Gardner–Webb*	Memorial Center; Johnson City, TN	W 30–17	4,502	
September 22	6:00 p.m.	Western Carolina	Memorial Center; Johnson City, TN	L 6–20	5,852	
September 29	2:00 p.m.	at No. 6 Appalachian State	Kidd Brewer Stadium; Boone, NC	L 14–33	16,567	
October 4	7:00 p.m.	The Citadel	Memorial Center; Johnson City, TN	W 23–21	4,769	
October 20	2:00 p.m.	at No. 3 Furman	Paladin Stadium; Greenville, SC	L 6–31	11,009	
October 27	7:00 p.m.	No. 1 Georgia Southern	Memorial Center; Johnson City, TN	W 19–16	5,543	
November 3	1:30 p.m.	at Charleston Southern*	Buccaneer Field; North Charleston, SC	W 26–0	1,741	
November 10	2:00 p.m.	Chattanooga	Memorial Center; Johnson City, TN	W 32–10	8,748	
November 17	1:30 p.m.	at Wofford	Gibbs Stadium; Spartanburg, SC	L 3–24	4,801	
November 22	12:00 p.m.	at VMI	Alumni Memorial Field; Lexington, VA	W 34–23	3,125	
*Non-conference game; Rankings from The Sports Network Poll released prior to the game; All times are in Eastern time
