= 2001 Stony Brook Seawolves football team =

American college football season

2001 Stony Brook Seawolves football
- Conference: Northeast Conference
- Record: 3–6 (3–5 NEC)
- Head coach: Sam Kornhauser (18th season)
- Home stadium: Seawolves Field

2001 Northeast Conference football standings
	Conf.			Overall
Team	W		L	W		L
Sacred Heart $	8	–	0	11	–	0
Robert Morris	6	–	1	6	–	3
Albany	5	–	2	7	–	3
Monmouth	5	–	2	7	–	3
Stony Brook	3	–	5	3	–	6
Wagner	3	–	5	3	–	6
Central Connecticut State	2	–	5	2	–	7
St. John's	1	–	6	1	–	9
Saint Francis (PA)	0	–	7	0	–	10
$ – Conference champion

The 2001 Stony Brook Seawolves football team represented Stony Brook University as a member of the Northeast Conference (NEC) during the 2001 NCAA Division I-AA football season. Led by 18th-year head coach Sam Kornhauser, the Seawolves compiled an overall record of 3–6 with a mark of 3–5 in conference place, tying for fifth place in the NEC. Stony Brook played home games at Seawolves Field in Stony Brook, New York.

== Schedule ==
Date	Time	Opponent	Site	Result	Attendance	Source
September 21	7:30 p.m.	at St. John's	DaSilva Memorial Field; Jamaica, NY	L 13–16	2,214	
September 29	1:00 p.m.	at Albany	University Field; Albany, NY (rivalry)	L 18–28	1,426	
October 6	12:30 p.m.	Wagner	Seawolves Field; Stony Brook, NY	W 52–30	823	
October 13	1:00 p.m.	at Sacred Heart	Campus Field; Fairfield, CT	L 24–42	4,006	
October 20	12:30 p.m.	Monmouth	Seawolves Field; Stony Brook, NY	L 14–33	3,564	
October 27	12:30 p.m.	Jacksonville*	Seawolves Field; Stony Brook, NY	L 20–29	465	
November 3	1:30 p.m.	at Robert Morris	Moon Stadium; Moon Township, PA	L 19–45	2,236	
November 10	12:30 p.m.	Central Connecticut State	Seawolves Field; Stony Brook, NY	W 17–15		
November 17	12:30 p.m.	Saint Francis (PA)	Seawolves Field; Stony Brook, NY	W 34–0	326	
*Non-conference game; All times are in Eastern time
