= 2001 Florida A&M Rattlers football team =

American college football season

2001 Florida A&M Rattlers football

Black college national champion MEAC champion

NCAA Division I-AA First Round, L 35–60 at Georgia Southern
- Conference: Mid-Eastern Athletic Conference

Ranking
- Sports Network: No. 22
- Record: 7–4 (7–1 MEAC)
- Head coach: Billy Joe (8th season)
- Offensive scheme: Gulf Coast
- Home stadium: Bragg Memorial Stadium

2001 Mid-Eastern Athletic Conference football standings
	Conf.			Overall
Team	W		L	W		L
No. 22 Florida A&M $^	7	–	1	7	–	4
Hampton	6	–	2	7	–	4
North Carolina A&T	5	–	3	8	–	3
Bethune–Cookman	5	–	3	6	–	4
South Carolina State	5	–	3	6	–	5
Delaware State	3	–	5	5	–	6
Norfolk State	3	–	5	5	–	6
Howard	1	–	7	2	–	9
Morgan State	1	–	7	2	–	9
$ – Conference champion; ^ – NCAA Division I-AA playoff participant; Rankings from The Sports Network poll

The 2001 Florida A&M Rattlers football team represented Florida A&M University as a member of the Mid-Eastern Athletic Conference (MEAC) during the 2001 NCAA Division I-AA football season. Led by eighth-year head coach Billy Joe, the Rattlers compiled an overall record of 7–4, with a mark of 7–1 in conference play, and finished as MEAC champion. Florida A&M finished their season with a loss against Georgia Southern in the Division I-AA playoffs. At the conclusion of the season, the Rattlers were also recognized as black college national champion.

== Schedule ==
Date	Opponent	Rank	Site	Result	Attendance	Source
September 1	Delaware State	No. 12	Bragg Memorial Stadium; Tallahassee, FL	W 35–17	11,421	
September 8	Morgan State	No. 11	Bragg Memorial Stadium; Tallahassee, FL	W 21–12	18,821	
September 15	vs. No. 15 Grambling State*	No. 9	Paul Brown Stadium; Cincinnati, OH (Riverfront Classic)	Canceled		
September 22	vs. Tennessee State*	No. 9	Georgia Dome; Atlanta, GA (Atlanta Football Classic)	L 7–27	61,052	
September 29	at Howard	No. 18	William H. Greene Stadium; Washington, DC	W 53–20	4,421	
October 6	vs. South Carolina State	No. 17	Alltel Stadium; Jacksonville, FL (Orange Blossom Classic)	W 33–27	19,071	
October 13	at North Carolina A&T	No. 16	Aggie Stadium; Greensboro, NC	L 23–55	34,769	
October 20	Norfolk State	No. 25	Bragg Memorial Stadium; Tallahassee, FL	W 47–9	28,987	
October 27	at Hampton	No. 23	Armstrong Stadium; Hampton, VA	W 47–35	5,331	
November 3	Southern*	No. 20	Bragg Memorial Stadium; Tallahassee, FL	L 14–17 ^{OT}	17,123	
November 17	vs. Bethune–Cookman*		Florida Citrus Bowl; Orlando, FL (Florida Classic)	W 31–21	70,112	
December 1	at No. 2 Georgia Southern*	No. 22	Paulson Stadium; Statesboro, GA (NCAA Division I-AA First Round)	L 35–60	9,884	
*Non-conference game; Rankings from The Sports Network Poll released prior to the game
