= 2001 Alabama A&M Bulldogs football team =

American college football season

2001 Alabama A&M Bulldogs football
- Conference: Southwestern Athletic Conference
- East Division
- Record: 5–6 (4–3 SWAC)
- Head coach: Ron Cooper (4th season)
- Home stadium: Louis Crews Stadium

2001 Southwestern Athletic Conference football standings
	Conf.			Overall
Team	W		L	W		L
East Division
Alabama State xy	6	–	1	8	–	4
Jackson State	5	–	2	7	–	4
Alcorn State	5	–	2	6	–	5
Alabama A&M	3	–	4	4	–	7
Mississippi Valley State	0	–	7	0	–	11
West Division
No. 8 Grambling State xy$	6	–	1	10	–	1
Southern	5	–	2	7	–	4
Prairie View A&M	2	–	5	3	–	7
Texas Southern	2	–	5	3	–	7
Arkansas–Pine Bluff	1	–	6	4	–	7
Championship: Grambling State 38, Alabama State 31
$ – Conference champion; x – Division champion/co-champions; y – Championship game participant; Rankings from The Sports Network Poll

The 2001 Alabama A&M Bulldogs football team represented Alabama A&M University as a member of the Southwestern Athletic Conference (SWAC) during the 2001 NCAA Division I-AA football season. Led by fourth-year head coach Ron Cooper, the Bulldogs compiled an overall record of 5–6, with a conference record of 4–3, and finished fourth in the SWAC East Division.

== Schedule ==
Date	Opponent	Site	Result	Attendance	Source
September 1	at Tennessee State*	Adelphia Coliseum; Nashville, TN	L 6–27	22,000	
September 8	at No. 14 Grambling State	Eddie G. Robinson Memorial Stadium; Grambling, LA	L 7–30	7,432	
September 22	Texas Southern	Louis Crews Stadium; Normal, AL	W 24–10		
September 29	Jackson State	Louis Crews Stadium; Normal, AL	L 14–26		
October 6	at Southern	A. W. Mumford Stadium; Baton Rouge, LA	L 29–12		
October 13	Morris Brown*	Louis Crews Stadium; Normal, AL	L 13–16		
October 20	Miles*	Louis Crews Stadium; Normal, AL	W 21–17		
October 27	vs. Alabama State	Legion Field; Birmingham, AL (Magic City Classic)	W 0–35 (forefit win)		
November 10	at Alcorn State	Jack Spinks Stadium; Lorman, MS	L 35–40		
November 17	Arkansas–Pine Bluff	Louis Crews Stadium; Normal, AL	W 35–0		
November 23	at Mississippi Valley State	Rice–Totten Stadium; Itta Bena, MS	W 40–22		
*Non-conference game; Rankings from The Sports Network Poll released prior to the game
