= 2001 Prairie View A&M Panthers football team =

American college football season

2001 Prairie View A&M Panthers football
- Conference: Southwestern Athletic Conference
- West Division
- Record: 3–7 (2–5 SWAC)
- Head coach: Larry Dorsey (2nd season)
- Home stadium: Edward L. Blackshear Field; Reliant Astrodome

2001 Southwestern Athletic Conference football standings
	Conf.			Overall
Team	W		L	W		L
East Division
Alabama State xy	6	–	1	8	–	4
Jackson State	5	–	2	7	–	4
Alcorn State	5	–	2	6	–	5
Alabama A&M	3	–	4	4	–	7
Mississippi Valley State	0	–	7	0	–	11
West Division
No. 8 Grambling State xy$	6	–	1	10	–	1
Southern	5	–	2	7	–	4
Prairie View A&M	2	–	5	3	–	7
Texas Southern	2	–	5	3	–	7
Arkansas–Pine Bluff	1	–	6	4	–	7
Championship: Grambling State 38, Alabama State 31
$ – Conference champion; x – Division champion/co-champions; y – Championship game participant; Rankings from The Sports Network Poll

The 2001 Prairie View A&M Panthers football team represented Prairie View A&M University as a member of the Southwestern Athletic Conference (SWAC) during the 2001 NCAA Division I-AA football season. Led by second-year head coach Larry Dorsey, the Panthers compiled an overall record of 3–7, with a mark of 2–5 in conference play, and finished tied for third in the SWAC West Division.

== Schedule ==
Date	Opponent	Site	Result	Attendance	Source
September 1	at Texas Southern	Reliant Astrodome; Houston, TX (Labor Day Classic)	L 0–17		
September 16	at No. 7 McNeese State*	Cowboy Stadium; Lake Charles, LA	L 0–56	13,151	
September 22	Texas A&M–Kingsville*	Edward L. Blackshear Field; Prairie View, TX	L 14–21		
September 29	vs. No. 11 Grambling State	Cotton Bowl; Dallas, TX (rivalry)	L 6–40	51,149	
October 6	Mississippi Valley State	Edward L. Blackshear Field; Prairie View, TX	W 34–17		
October 13	Paul Quinn*	Edward L. Blackshear Field; Prairie View, TX	W 37–6		
October 20	at Alcorn State	Jack Spinks Stadium; Lorman, MS	L 20–48		
November 3	Arkansas–Pine Bluff	Edward L. Blackshear Field; Prairie View, TX	W 35–16		
November 10	Jackson State	Edward L. Blackshear Field; Prairie View, TX	L 20–38	2,109	
November 17	at Southern	A. W. Mumford Stadium; Baton Rouge, LA	L 28–43		
*Non-conference game; Rankings from The Sports Network Poll released prior to the game
