= 2001 Saint Francis Red Flash football team =

American college football season

2001 Saint Francis Red Flash football
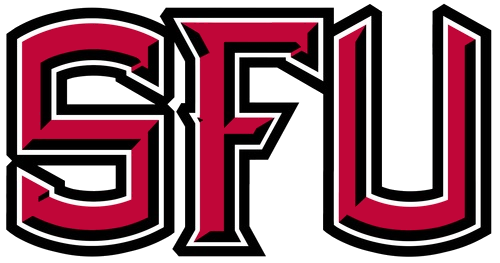
- Conference: Northeast Conference
- Record: 0–10 (0–7 NEC)
- Head coach: Dave Jaumotte (3rd season)
- Home stadium: Pine Bowl

2001 Northeast Conference football standings
	Conf.			Overall
Team	W		L	W		L
Sacred Heart $	8	–	0	11	–	0
Robert Morris	6	–	1	6	–	3
Albany	5	–	2	7	–	3
Monmouth	5	–	2	7	–	3
Stony Brook	3	–	5	3	–	6
Wagner	3	–	5	3	–	6
Central Connecticut State	2	–	5	2	–	7
St. John's	1	–	6	1	–	9
Saint Francis (PA)	0	–	7	0	–	10
$ – Conference champion

The 2001 Saint Francis Red Flash football team represented Saint Francis University as a member of the Northeast Conference (NEC) during the 2001 NCAA Division I-AA football season. The Red Flash were led by third-year head coach Dave Jaumotte and played its home games at the Pine Bowl. They finished the season 0–10 overall and 0–7 in NEC play to place last. Saint Francis' September 15 game against St. John's was canceled due to college football's collective decision to postpone games following the September 11 attacks.

After the season, Jaumotte resigned after compiling a 2–30 record over three seasons.

== Schedule ==
Date	Time	Opponent	Site	Result	Attendance	Source
September 1	7:00 p.m.	at Dayton*	Welcome Stadium; Dayton, OH	L 0–70	7,011	
September 8	1:00 p.m.	La Salle*	Pine Bowl; Loretto, PA	L 37–42	930	
September 15		St. John's	Pine Bowl; Loretto, PA	cancelled		
September 22	12:00 p.m.	at Saint Peter's*	Cochrane Stadium; Jersey City, NJ	L 7–27	1,225	
September 29	1:30 p.m.	at Robert Morris	Moon Stadium; Moon Township, PA	L 7–41	2,119	
October 6	1:00 p.m.	Central Connecticut State	Pine Bowl; Loretto, PA	L 6–19	1,141	
October 13	1:00 p.m.	Monmouth	Pine Bowl; Loretto, PA	L 0–28	683	
October 20	1:00 p.m.	at Wagner	Wagner College Stadium; Staten Island, NY	L 7–38	1,641	
October 27	1:00 p.m.	Albany	Pine Bowl; Loretto, PA	L 14–24	452	
November 10	12:30 p.m.	at Sacred Heart	Campus Field; Fairfield, CT	L 0–58	2,651	
November 17	12:30 p.m.	at Stony Brook	Seawolves Field; Stony Brook, NY	L 0–34	326	
*Non-conference game; All times are in Eastern time
