= 2001 Alcorn State Braves football team =

American college football season

2001 Alcorn State Braves football
- Conference: Southwestern Athletic Conference
- East Division
- Record: 6–5 (5–2 SWAC)
- Head coach: Johnny Thomas (4th season)
- Offensive coordinator: John McKenzie (2nd season)
- Defensive coordinator: Karl Morgan (1st season)
- Home stadium: Jack Spinks Stadium

2001 Southwestern Athletic Conference football standings
	Conf.			Overall
Team	W		L	W		L
East Division
Alabama State xy	6	–	1	8	–	4
Jackson State	5	–	2	7	–	4
Alcorn State	5	–	2	6	–	5
Alabama A&M	3	–	4	4	–	7
Mississippi Valley State	0	–	7	0	–	11
West Division
No. 8 Grambling State xy$	6	–	1	10	–	1
Southern	5	–	2	7	–	4
Prairie View A&M	2	–	5	3	–	7
Texas Southern	2	–	5	3	–	7
Arkansas–Pine Bluff	1	–	6	4	–	7
Championship: Grambling State 38, Alabama State 31
$ – Conference champion; x – Division champion/co-champions; y – Championship game participant; Rankings from The Sports Network Poll

The 2001 Alcorn State Braves football team represented Alcorn State University as a member of the Southwestern Athletic Conference (SWAC) during the 2001 NCAA Division I-AA football season. Led by fourth-year head coach Johnny Thomas, the Braves compiled an overall record of 6–5, with a conference record of 5–2, and finished tied for second in the SWAC East Division.

== Schedule ==
Date	Opponent	Site	Result	Attendance	Source
September 1	No. 15 Grambling State	Jack Spinks Stadium; Lorman, MS	L 22–37	17,500	
September 8	at Alabama State	Cramton Bowl; Montgomery, AL	W 20–17		
September 22	at No. 5 McNeese State*	Cowboy Stadium; Lake Charles, LA	L 14–54	14,529	
September 29	at Fort Valley State*	Wildcat Stadium; Fort Valley, GA	L 16–31	6,519	
October 13	Samford*	Jack Spinks Stadium; Lorman, MS	W 17–7	1,000	
October 20	Prairie View A&M	Jack Spinks Stadium; Lorman, MS	W 48–20		
October 27	Cal Poly*	Jack Spinks Stadium; Lorman, MS	L 12–21		
November 3	Mississippi Valley State	Jack Spinks Stadium; Lorman, MS	W 35–28		
November 10	Alabama A&M	Jack Spinks Stadium; Lorman, MS	W 40–35		
November 17	at Jackson State	Mississippi Veterans Memorial Stadium; Jackson, MS (Capital City Classic)	L 28–52		
November 24	at Arkansas–Pine Bluff	Golden Lion Stadium; Pine Bluff, AR	W 17–10		
*Non-conference game; Rankings from The Sports Network Poll released prior to the game
