= 2001 Hampton Pirates football team =

American college football season

2001 Hampton Pirates football
- Conference: Mid-Eastern Athletic Conference
- Record: 7–4 (6–2 MEAC)
- Head coach: Joe Taylor (10th season)
- Home stadium: Armstrong Stadium

2001 Mid-Eastern Athletic Conference football standings
	Conf.			Overall
Team	W		L	W		L
No. 22 Florida A&M $^	7	–	1	7	–	4
Hampton	6	–	2	7	–	4
North Carolina A&T	5	–	3	8	–	3
Bethune–Cookman	5	–	3	6	–	4
South Carolina State	5	–	3	6	–	5
Delaware State	3	–	5	5	–	6
Norfolk State	3	–	5	5	–	6
Howard	1	–	7	2	–	9
Morgan State	1	–	7	2	–	9
$ – Conference champion; ^ – NCAA Division I-AA playoff participant; Rankings from The Sports Network poll

The 2001 Hampton Pirates football team represented Hampton University as a member of the Mid-Eastern Athletic Conference (MEAC) during the 2001 NCAA Division I-AA football season. Led by 10th-year head coach Joe Taylor, the Pirates compiled an overall record of 7–4, with a mark of 6–2 in conference play, and finished second in the MEAC.

== Schedule ==
Date	Opponent	Site	Result	Attendance	Source
September 1	at New Hampshire*	Cowell Stadium; Durham, NH	L 29–45	4,682	
September 8	at Howard	William H. Greene Stadium; Washington, DC (rivalry)	W 27–20	11,869	
September 22	vs. Virginia State*	Giants Stadium; East Rutherford, NJ (New York Urban League Football Classic)	W 55–14	35,681	
September 29	Delaware State	Armstrong Stadium; Hampton, VA	W 31–20	6,636	
October 6	No. 7 Rhode Island*	Armstrong Stadium; Hampton, VA	L 7–56	1,802	
October 13	at Norfolk State	William "Dick" Price Stadium; Norfolk, VA (rivalry)	L 20–28	18,972	
October 20	South Carolina State^{†}	Armstrong Stadium; Hampton, VA	W 28–17	16,842	
October 27	No. 23 Florida A&M	Armstrong Stadium; Hampton, VA	L 35–47	5,331	
November 3	at Bethune–Cookman	Daytona Stadium; Daytona Beach, FL	W 44–41		
November 10	at No. 12 North Carolina A&T	Aggie Stadium; Greensboro, NC	W 23–7		
November 17	Morgan State	Armstrong Stadium; Hampton, VA	W 35–20	7,551	
*Non-conference game; ^{†}Homecoming; Rankings from The Sports Network Poll released prior to the game
