= 2001 Furman Paladins football team =

American college football season

2001 Furman Paladins football

SoCon co-champion

NCAA Division I-AA Championship Game, L 6–13 vs. Montana
- Conference: Southern Conference

Ranking
- Sports Network: No. 2
- Record: 12–3 (7–1 SoCon)
- Head coach: Bobby Johnson (8th season)
- Captains: Louis Ivory; Chris Stewart; Will Bouton; Shelvis Smith
- Home stadium: Paladin Stadium

2001 Southern Conference football standings
	Conf.			Overall
Team	W		L	W		L
No. 2 Furman $^	7	–	1	12	–	3
No. 3 Georgia Southern $^	7	–	1	12	–	2
No. 6 Appalachian State ^	6	–	2	9	–	4
Western Carolina	5	–	3	7	–	4
East Tennessee State	4	–	4	6	–	5
Wofford	3	–	5	4	–	7
The Citadel	2	–	6	3	–	7
Chattanooga	1	–	7	3	–	8
VMI	1	–	7	1	–	10
$ – Conference champion; ^ – NCAA Division I-AA playoff participant; Rankings from The Sports Network I-AA Poll

The 2001 Furman Paladins football team represented the Furman University as a member of the Southern Conference (SoCon) during the 2001 NCAA Division I-AA football season. Led by Bobby Johnson in his eighth and final year as head coach, the Paladins compiled an overall record of 12–3 with a mark of 7–1 in conference play, sharing the SoCon title with Georgia Southern. Furman advanced to the NCAA Division I-AA Football Championship playoffs, where they beat Western Kentucky in the first round, Lehigh in the quarterfinals, and Georgia Southern in the semifinals before losing to Montana in the NCAA Division I-AA Championship Game.

== Schedule ==
Date	Time	Opponent	Rank	Site	TV	Result	Attendance	Source
September 1	2:00 pm	at Wyoming*	No. 6	War Memorial Stadium; Laramie, WY		L 14–20	14,167	
September 8	7:00 pm	Elon*	No. 6	Paladin Stadium; Greenville, SC		W 46–7	10,322	
September 15		at Liberty*		Williams Stadium; Lynchburg, VA		Canceled		
September 22	7:00 pm	VMI	No. 4	Paladin Stadium; Greenville, SC		W 65–7	10,152	
September 29	6:00 pm	Western Carolina	No. 4	Bob Waters Field at E. J. Whitmire Stadium; Cullowhee, NC		W 31–13	8,714	
October 6	3:00 pm	No. 5 Appalachian State	No. 3	Paladin Stadium; Greenville, SC	CCSS	W 28–22	14,411	
October 13	2:00 pm	at The Citadel	No. 3	Johnson Hagood Stadium; Charleston, SC (rivalry)		W 31–7	16,982	
October 20	2:00 pm	East Tennessee State	No. 3	Paladin Stadium; Greenville, SC		W 31–6	11,009	
November 3	3:38 pm	at No. 4 Georgia Southern	No. 2	Paulson Stadium; Statesboro, GA	FSNS	L 10–20	21,593	
November 10	3:30 pm	Wofford	No. 5	Paladin Stadium; Greenville, SC (rivalry)	CCSS	W 45–14	10,534	
November 17	7:00 pm	at Chattanooga	No. 4	Finley Stadium; Chattanooga, TN		W 42–10	6,366	
November 24	2:00 pm	Presbyterian*	No. 4	Paladin Stadium; Greenville, SC		W 47–28	7,241	
December 1	12:00 pm	No. 12 Western Kentucky*	No. 4	Paladin Stadium; Greenville, SC (NCAA Division I-AA First Round)		W 24–20	6,143	
December 8	12:07 pm	No. 5 Lehigh*	No. 4	Paladin Stadium; Greenville, SC (NCAA Division I-AA Quarterfinal)		W 34–17	10,189	
December 15	12:00 pm	at No. 2 Georgia Southern*	No. 4	Paulson Stadium; Statesboro, GA (NCAA Division I-AA Semifinal)	CCSS	W 24–17	11,827	
December 21	3:30 pm	vs. No. 1 Montana*	No. 4	Finley Stadium; Chattanooga, TN (NCAA Division I-AA Championship Game)	ESPN	L 6–13	12,698	
*Non-conference game; Rankings from The Sports Network Poll released prior to the game; All times are in Mountain time
