= 2001 Tennessee State Tigers football team =

American college football season

2001 Tennessee State Tigers football
- Conference: Ohio Valley Conference
- Record: 8–3 (3–3 OVC)
- Head coach: James Reese (2nd season)
- Home stadium: Adelphia Coliseum

2001 Ohio Valley Conference football standings
	Conf.			Overall
Team	W		L	W		L
No. 9 Eastern Illinois $^	6	–	0	9	–	1
No. 18 Eastern Kentucky	5	–	1	8	–	2
No. 23 Tennessee Tech	4	–	2	7	–	3
No. 25 Tennessee State	3	–	3	8	–	3
Murray State	2	–	4	4	–	6
Southeast Missouri State	1	–	5	4	–	7
Tennessee–Martin	0	–	6	1	–	10
$ – Conference champion; ^ – NCAA Division I-AA playoff participant; Rankings from The Sports Network poll

The 2001 Tennessee State Tigers football team represented Tennessee State University as a member of the Ohio Valley Conference (OVC) during the 2001 NCAA Division I-AA football season. Led by second-year head coach James Reese, the Tigers compiled an overall record of 8–3, with a conference record of 3–3, and finished fourth in the OVC.

== Schedule ==
Date	Opponent	Rank	Site	Result	Attendance	Source
September 1	Alabama A&M*		Adelphia Coliseum; Nashville, TN	W 27–6	22,000	
September 22	vs. No. 9 Florida A&M*		Georgia Dome; Atlanta, GA (Atlanta Football Classic)	W 27–7	61,052	
September 29	Southeast Missouri State	No. 25	Adelphia Coliseum; Nashville, TN	W 20–14		
October 6	vs. Howard*	No. 22	RCA Dome; Indianapolis, IN (Circle City Classic)	W 45–0	51,060	
October 13	Mississippi Valley State*	No. 18	Adelphia Coliseum; Nashville, TN	W 41–3		
October 20	Tennessee–Martin	No. 15	Adelphia Coliseum; Nashville, TN	W 55–7		
October 27	at No. 9 Eastern Illinois	No. 13	O'Brien Stadium; Charleston, IL	L 49–52		
November 3	Murray State	No. 15	Adelphia Coliseum; Nashville, TN	W 38–25	5,515	
November 10	at Tennessee Tech	No. 14	Tucker Stadium; Cookeville, TN	L 13–63		
November 17	at No. 20 Eastern Kentucky	No. 24	Roy Kidd Stadium; Richmond, KY	L 10–13		
November 22	vs. Jackson State*		Liberty Bowl Memorial Stadium; Memphis, TN (Southern Heritage Classic)	W 64–33	28,690	
*Non-conference game; Rankings from The Sports Network Poll released prior to the game
