= 2001 Arkansas–Pine Bluff Golden Lions football team =

American college football season

2001 Arkansas–Pine Bluff Golden Lions football
- Conference: Southwestern Athletic Conference
- West Division
- Record: 5–6 (2–5 SWAC)
- Head coach: Lee Hardman (9th season)
- Home stadium: Golden Lion Stadium

2001 Southwestern Athletic Conference football standings
	Conf.			Overall
Team	W		L	W		L
East Division
Alabama State xy	6	–	1	8	–	4
Jackson State	5	–	2	7	–	4
Alcorn State	5	–	2	6	–	5
Alabama A&M	3	–	4	4	–	7
Mississippi Valley State	0	–	7	0	–	11
West Division
No. 8 Grambling State xy$	6	–	1	10	–	1
Southern	5	–	2	7	–	4
Prairie View A&M	2	–	5	3	–	7
Texas Southern	2	–	5	3	–	7
Arkansas–Pine Bluff	1	–	6	4	–	7
Championship: Grambling State 38, Alabama State 31
$ – Conference champion; x – Division champion/co-champions; y – Championship game participant; Rankings from The Sports Network Poll

The 2001 Arkansas–Pine Bluff Golden Lions football team represented the University of Arkansas at Pine Bluff as a member of the Southwestern Athletic Conference (SWAC) during the 2001 NCAA Division I-AA football season. Led by ninth-year head coach Lee Hardman, the Golden Lions compiled an overall record of 5–6, with a mark of 2–5 in conference play, and finished fifth in the SWAC West Division.

== Schedule ==
Date	Opponent	Site	Result	Attendance	Source
September 1	Mississippi Valley State	Golden Lion Stadium; Pine Bluff, AR	W 19–9		
September 8	at Southern	A. W. Mumford Stadium; Baton Rouge, LA	L 14–35		
September 29	vs. Kentucky State*	Trans World Dome; St. Louis, MO (Gateway Classic)	W 20–13		
October 6	Texas Southern	Golden Lion Stadium; Pine Bluff, AR	W 28–22		
October 13	vs. No. 7 Grambling State	Independence Stadium; Shreveport, LA (Red River Classic)	L 7–60	18,000	
October 20	Alabama State	Golden Lion Stadium; Pine Bluff, AR	W 17–20 (ASU forefit)	5,121	
October 27	at Jackson State	Mississippi Veterans Memorial Stadium; Jackson, MS	L 9–14	15,500	
November 3	at Prairie View A&M	Edward L. Blackshear Field; Prairie View, TX	L 16–35		
November 10	Lane*	Golden Lion Stadium; Pine Bluff, AR	W 14–7		
November 17	at Alabama A&M	Louis Crews Stadium; Normal, AL	L 0–35		
November 24	Alcorn State	Golden Lion Stadium; Pine Bluff, AR	L 10–17		
*Non-conference game; Rankings from The Sports Network Poll released prior to the game
