= 2001 Wagner Seahawks football team =

American college football season

2001 Wagner Seahawks football
- Conference: Northeast Conference
- Record: 3–6 (3–5 NEC)
- Head coach: Walt Hameline (21st season)
- Home stadium: Wagner College Stadium

2001 Northeast Conference football standings
| | Conf. | | | Overall |
| Team | W | | L | W | | L |
|---|---|---|---|---|---|---|
| Sacred Heart $ | 8 | – | 0 | 11 | – | 0 |
| Robert Morris | 6 | – | 1 | 6 | – | 3 |
| Albany | 5 | – | 2 | 7 | – | 3 |
| Monmouth | 5 | – | 2 | 7 | – | 3 |
| Stony Brook | 3 | – | 5 | 3 | – | 6 |
| Wagner | 3 | – | 5 | 3 | – | 6 |
| Central Connecticut State | 2 | – | 5 | 2 | – | 7 |
| St. John's | 1 | – | 6 | 1 | – | 9 |
| Saint Francis (PA) | 0 | – | 7 | 0 | – | 10 |
$ – Conference champion

The 2001 Wagner Seahawks football team represented Wagner College in the 2001 NCAA Division I-AA football season as a member of the Northeast Conference (NEC). The Seahawks were led by 21st-year head coach Walt Hameline and played their home games at Wagner College Stadium. Wagner finished the season 3–6 overall and 3–5 in NEC play to tie for fourth place. Wagner's September 15 game at Georgetown was canceled due to college football's collective decision to postpone games following the September 11 attacks.

== Schedule ==
| Date | Time | Opponent | Site | Result | Attendance | Source |
|---|---|---|---|---|---|---|
| September 8 | 1:00 p.m. | at Monmouth | Kessler Field; West Long Branch, NJ | L 15–23 | 2,854 | |
| September 15 | 1:00 p.m. | at Georgetown* | Cooper Field; Washington, DC | Canceled | | |
| September 22 | 1:00 p.m. | Albany | Wagner College Stadium; Staten Island, NY | L 30–35 | 2,138 | |
| September 29 | 1:00 p.m. | at St. John's | DaSilva Memorial Field; Jamaica, New York | W 34–7 | 1,010 | |
| October 6 | 1:30 p.m. | at Stony Brook | Seawolves Field; Stony Brook, NY | L 30–52 | 823 | |
| October 13 | 1:00 p.m. | Central Connecticut State | Wagner College Stadium; Staten Island, NY | W 24–17 ^{OT} | 1,776 | |
| October 20 | 1:00 p.m. | Saint Francis (PA) | Wagner College Stadium; Staten Island, NY | W 38–7 | 1,641 | |
| October 27 | 1:30 p.m. | at Robert Morris | Moon Stadium; Moon Township, PA | L 30–49 | 1,114 | |
| November 3 | 1:00 p.m. | Sacred Heart | Wagner College Stadium; Staten Island, NY | L 24–45 | 3,088 | |
| November 10 | 4:30 p.m. | at San Diego* | Torero Stadium; San Diego, CA | L 24–51 | | |
*Non-conference game; All times are in Eastern time
