= 2001 Charleston Southern Buccaneers football team =

American college football season

2001 Charleston Southern Buccaneers football
- Conference: Independent
- Record: 5–6
- Head coach: David Dowd (11th season)
- Defensive coordinator: Todd Knight (4th season)
- Home stadium: Buccaneer Field

2001 NCAA Division I-AA independents football standings
	Conf.			Overall
Team	W		L	W		L
Cal Poly		–		6	–	5
Saint Mary's		–		6	–	5
Samford		–		5	–	5
Charleston Southern		–		5	–	6
Morris Brown		–		5	–	6
Florida Atlantic		–		4	–	6
Cal State Northridge		–		3	–	7
Liberty		–		3	–	8
Savannah State		–		2	–	7
Elon		–		2	–	9
Southern Utah		–		2	–	9

The 2001 Charleston Southern Buccaneers football team represented Charleston Southern University as an independent during the 2001 NCAA Division I-AA football season. Led by 11th-year head coach David Dowd, the Buccaneers compiled a record of 5–6. Charleston Southern played home games at Buccaneer Field in Charleston, South Carolina.

== Schedule ==
Date	Time	Opponent	Site	Result	Attendance	Source
September 2		North Greenville	Buccaneer Field; Charleston, SC	W 38–0	3,094	
September 8	1:30 pm	Presbyterian	Buccaneer Field; Charleston, SC	L 10–19	3,512	
September 22	7:00 pm	at Wofford	Gibbs Stadium; Spartanburg, SC	L 10–35	7,214	
September 29	1:30 pm	Benedict	Buccaneer Field; Charleston, SC	W 20–16	4,000	
October 6	1:00 pm	at Jacksonville	D. B. Milne Field; Jacksonville, FL	W 28–7	1,440	
October 13	1:30 pm	Austin Peay	Buccaneer Field; Charleston, SC	W 36–21	1,228	
October 20	1:30 pm	Samford	Buccaneer Field; Charleston, SC	L 24–45		
October 27	7:00 pm	at Elon	Rhodes Stadium; Elon, NC	L 16–39	4,338	
November 3	1:30 pm	East Tennessee State	Buccaneer Field; Charleston, SC	L 0–26	1,741	
November 10	1:30 pm	Liberty	Buccaneer Field; Charleston, SC	L 31–45	1,816	
November 17	1:30 pm	West Virginia State	Buccaneer Field; Charleston, SC	W 49–0	467	
All times are in Eastern time
