= 2001 Morgan State Bears football team =

American college football season

2001 Morgan State Bears football
- Conference: Mid-Eastern Athletic Conference
- Record: 2–9 (1–7 MEAC)
- Head coach: Stanley Mitchell (3rd season)
- Home stadium: Hughes Stadium

2001 Mid-Eastern Athletic Conference football standings
	Conf.			Overall
Team	W		L	W		L
No. 22 Florida A&M $^	7	–	1	7	–	4
Hampton	6	–	2	7	–	4
North Carolina A&T	5	–	3	8	–	3
Bethune–Cookman	5	–	3	6	–	4
South Carolina State	5	–	3	6	–	5
Delaware State	3	–	5	5	–	6
Norfolk State	3	–	5	5	–	6
Howard	1	–	7	2	–	9
Morgan State	1	–	7	2	–	9
$ – Conference champion; ^ – NCAA Division I-AA playoff participant; Rankings from The Sports Network poll

The 2001 Morgan State Bears football team represented Morgan State University as a member of the Mid-Eastern Athletic Conference (MEAC) during the 2001 NCAA Division I-AA football season. Led by third-year head coach Stanley Mitchell, the Bears compiled an overall record of 2–9, with a mark of 1–7 in conference play, and finished tied for eighth in the MEAC.

== Schedule ==
Date	Opponent	Site	Result	Attendance	Source
September 1	vs. Bethune–Cookman	Alltel Stadium; Jacksonville, FL (Gateway Classic)	L 24–35	12,185	
September 8	at No. 11 Florida A&M	Bragg Memorial Stadium; Tallahassee, FL	L 12–21	18,821	
September 22	Howard	Hughes Stadium; Baltimore, MD (rivalry)	L 15–41	14,262	
September 29	Towson*	Hughes Stadium; Baltimore, MD (rivalry)	L 17–20 ^{OT}	7,418	
October 6	No. 23 North Carolina A&T	Hughes Stadium; Baltimore, MD	W 52–42		
October 13	Savannah State*^{†}	Hughes Stadium; Baltimore, MD	W 26–0	14,801	
October 20	at Delaware State	Alumni Stadium; Dover, DE	L 12–38	5,189	
October 27	at Morris Brown*	Herndon Stadium; Atlanta, GA	L 20–22	13,288	
November 4	Norfolk State	Hughes Stadium; Baltimore, MD	L 27–33	6,472	
November 10	South Carolina State	Hughes Stadium; Baltimore, MD	L 26–29	4,375	
November 17	at Hampton	Armstrong Stadium; Hampton, VA	L 20–35	7,551	
*Non-conference game; ^{†}Homecoming; Rankings from The Sports Network Poll released prior to the game
