= 2001 Alabama State Hornets football team =

American college football season

2001 Alabama State Hornets football

SWAC East Division champion

SWAC Championship Game, L 31–38 vs. Grambling State
- Conference: Southwestern Athletic Conference
- East Division
- Record: 0–12, 8 wins forfeited (0–7 SWAC, 6 wins forfeited)
- Head coach: L. C. Cole (2nd season)
- Home stadium: Cramton Bowl

2001 Southwestern Athletic Conference football standings
	Conf.			Overall
Team	W		L	W		L
East Division
Alabama State xy	6	–	1	8	–	4
Jackson State	5	–	2	7	–	4
Alcorn State	5	–	2	6	–	5
Alabama A&M	3	–	4	4	–	7
Mississippi Valley State	0	–	7	0	–	11
West Division
No. 8 Grambling State xy$	6	–	1	10	–	1
Southern	5	–	2	7	–	4
Prairie View A&M	2	–	5	3	–	7
Texas Southern	2	–	5	3	–	7
Arkansas–Pine Bluff	1	–	6	4	–	7
Championship: Grambling State 38, Alabama State 31
$ – Conference champion; x – Division champion/co-champions; y – Championship game participant; Rankings from The Sports Network Poll

The 2001 Alabama State Hornets football team represented Alabama State University as a member of the Southwestern Athletic Conference (SWAC) during the 2001 NCAA Division I-AA football season. Led by second-year head coach L. C. Cole, the Hornets compiled an overall record of 8–4, with a mark of 6–1 in conference play, finished as SWAC East Division champion, and lost to Grambling State in the SWAC Championship Game. In December 2009, the NCAA ruled Alabama State to forfeit all victories from the 2001 season and this resulted in an official record of 0–12.

== Schedule ==
Date	Opponent	Site	Result	Attendance	Source
September 8	Alcorn State	Cramton Bowl; Montgomery, AL	L 17–20		
September 22	vs. Southern	Ladd–Peebles Stadium; Mobile, AL (Gulf Coast Classic)	L 7–32	26,543	
September 29	Johnson C. Smith*	Cramton Bowl; Montgomery, AL	L 71–6 (forfeit loss)		
October 6	at Jackson State	Mississippi Veterans Memorial Stadium; Jackson, MS	L 61–58 (forfeit loss)		
October 13	at Texas Southern	Reliant Astrodome; Houston, TX	L 27–24 (forefit loss)		
October 20	at Arkansas–Pine Bluff	Golden Lion Stadium; Pine Bluff, AR	L 20–17 (forefit loss)	5,121	
October 27	vs. Alabama A&M	Legion Field; Birmingham, AL (Magic City Classic)	L 35–0 (forefit loss)		
November 3	No. 3 Grambling State	Cramton Bowl; Montgomery, AL	L 45–38 (forefit loss)	13,029	
November 10	Clark Atlanta*	Cramton Bowl; Montgomery, AL	L 43–10 (forefit loss)		
November 17	at Mississippi Valley State	Rice–Totten Stadium; Itta Bena, MS	L 57–24 (forefit loss)		
November 22	Tuskegee*	Cramton Bowl; Montgomery, AL (Turkey Day Classic)	L 27–31		
December 1	vs. No. 7 Grambling State*	Legion Field; Birmingham, AL (SWAC Championship Game)	L 31–38	38,487	
*Non-conference game; Rankings from The Sports Network Poll released prior to the game
