= 2001 South Carolina State Bulldogs football team =

American college football season

2001 South Carolina State Bulldogs football
- Conference: Mid-Eastern Athletic Conference
- Record: 6–5 (5–3 MEAC)
- Head coach: Willie Jeffries (19th season)
- Home stadium: Oliver C. Dawson Stadium

2001 Mid-Eastern Athletic Conference football standings
	Conf.			Overall
Team	W		L	W		L
No. 22 Florida A&M $^	7	–	1	7	–	4
Hampton	6	–	2	7	–	4
North Carolina A&T	5	–	3	8	–	3
Bethune–Cookman	5	–	3	6	–	4
South Carolina State	5	–	3	6	–	5
Delaware State	3	–	5	5	–	6
Norfolk State	3	–	5	5	–	6
Howard	1	–	7	2	–	9
Morgan State	1	–	7	2	–	9
$ – Conference champion; ^ – NCAA Division I-AA playoff participant; Rankings from The Sports Network poll

The 2001 South Carolina State Bulldogs football team represented South Carolina State University as a member of the Mid-Eastern Athletic Conference (MEAC) during the 2001 NCAA Division I-AA football season. Led by 19th-year head coach Willie Jeffries, the Bulldogs compiled an overall record of 6–5, with a mark of 5–3 in conference play, and finished tied for third in the MEAC.

== Schedule ==
Date	Opponent	Site	Result	Attendance	Source
September 1	at Morris Brown*	Herndon Stadium; Atlanta, GA	W 21–7	12,500	
September 8	Savannah State*	Oliver C. Dawson Stadium; Orangeburg, SC	L 9–14	7,640	
September 29	at The Citadel*	Johnson Hagood Stadium; Charleston, SC	L 8–31	15,180	
October 6	vs. No. 17 Florida A&M	Alltel Stadium; Jacksonville, FL (Orange Blossom Classic)	L 27–33	19,071	
October 13	Bethune–Cookman	Oliver C. Dawson Stadium; Orangeburg, SC	L 10–24		
October 20	at Hampton	Armstrong Stadium; Hampton, VA	L 17–28	16,842	
October 27	Delaware State	Oliver C. Dawson Stadium; Orangeburg, SC	W 42–21	14,695	
November 3	at Howard	William H. Greene Stadium; Washington, DC	W 37–33		
November 10	at Morgan State	Hughes Stadium; Baltimore, MD	W 29–26	4,375	
November 17	No. 22 North Carolina A&T	Oliver C. Dawson Stadium; Orangeburg, SC (rivalry)	W 15–14	9,704	
November 24	Norfolk State	Oliver C. Dawson Stadium; Orangeburg, SC	W 16–10		
*Non-conference game; Rankings from The Sports Network Poll released prior to the game
