= 2001 Bethune–Cookman Wildcats football team =

American college football season

2001 Bethune–Cookman Wildcats football
- Conference: Mid-Eastern Athletic Conference
- Record: 6–4 (5–3 MEAC)
- Head coach: Alvin Wyatt (5th season)
- Home stadium: Municipal Stadium

2001 Mid-Eastern Athletic Conference football standings
| | Conf. | | | Overall |
| Team | W | | L | W | | L |
|---|---|---|---|---|---|---|
| No. 22 Florida A&M $^ | 7 | – | 1 | 7 | – | 4 |
| Hampton | 6 | – | 2 | 7 | – | 4 |
| North Carolina A&T | 5 | – | 3 | 8 | – | 3 |
| Bethune–Cookman | 5 | – | 3 | 6 | – | 4 |
| South Carolina State | 5 | – | 3 | 6 | – | 5 |
| Delaware State | 3 | – | 5 | 5 | – | 6 |
| Norfolk State | 3 | – | 5 | 5 | – | 6 |
| Howard | 1 | – | 7 | 2 | – | 9 |
| Morgan State | 1 | – | 7 | 2 | – | 9 |
$ – Conference champion; ^ – NCAA Division I-AA playoff participant; Rankings from The Sports Network poll

The 2001 Bethune–Cookman Wildcats football team represented Bethune–Cookman College (now known as Bethune–Cookman University) as a member of the Mid-Eastern Athletic Conference (MEAC) during the 2001 NCAA Division I-AA football season. Led by fifth-year head coach Alvin Wyatt, the Wildcats compiled an overall record of 6–4, with a mark of 5–3 in conference play, and finished tied for third in the MEAC.

== Schedule ==
| Date | Opponent | Rank | Site | Result | Attendance | Source |
|---|---|---|---|---|---|---|
| September 1 | vs. Morgan State | | Alltel Stadium; Jacksonville, FL (Gateway Classic) | W 35–24 | 12,185 | |
| September 8 | Florida Atlantic* | | Municipal Stadium; Daytona Beach, FL | L 28–31 | 7,621 | |
| September 15 | vs. Savannah State* | | Lockhart Stadium; Fort Lauderdale, FL (South Florida Football Classic) | Canceled | N/A | |
| September 22 | at Norfolk State | | William "Dick" Price Stadium; Norfolk, VA | W 32–7 | | |
| September 30 | Morris Brown* | | Municipal Stadium; Daytona Beach, FL | W 30–0 | | |
| October 6 | vs. Delaware State | | Veterans Stadium; Philadelphia, PA (Richard Allen Classic) | W 49–24 | | |
| October 13 | at South Carolina State | | Oliver C. Dawson Stadium; Orangeburg, SC | W 24–10 | | |
| October 27 | No. 19 North Carolina A&T | No. 25 | Municipal Stadium; Daytona Beach, FL | L 14–16 | 16,725 | |
| November 3 | Hampton | | Municipal Stadium; Daytona Beach, FL | L 41–44 | | |
| November 10 | at Howard | | William H. Greene Stadium; Washington, DC | W 29–18 | | |
| November 17 | vs. Florida A&M* | | Florida Citrus Bowl; Orlando, FL (Florida Classic) | L 21–31 | 70,112 | |
*Non-conference game; Rankings from The Sports Network Poll released prior to the game
