= 2001 Grambling State Tigers football team =

American college football season

2001 Grambling State Tigers football

Black college national champion SWAC champion

SWAC Championship Game, W 38–31 vs. Alabama State
- Conference: Southwestern Athletic Conference
- West Division

Ranking
- Sports Network: No. 8
- Record: 10–1 (6–1 SWAC)
- Head coach: Doug Williams (4th season)
- Offensive coordinator: Melvin Spears (4th season)
- Home stadium: Eddie G. Robinson Memorial Stadium

2001 Southwestern Athletic Conference football standings
| | Conf. | | | Overall |
| Team | W | | L | W | | L |
|---|---|---|---|---|---|---|
East Division
| Alabama State xy | 6 | – | 1 | 8 | – | 4 |
| Jackson State | 5 | – | 2 | 7 | – | 4 |
| Alcorn State | 5 | – | 2 | 6 | – | 5 |
| Alabama A&M | 3 | – | 4 | 4 | – | 7 |
| Mississippi Valley State | 0 | – | 7 | 0 | – | 11 |
West Division
| No. 8 Grambling State xy$ | 6 | – | 1 | 10 | – | 1 |
| Southern | 5 | – | 2 | 7 | – | 4 |
| Prairie View A&M | 2 | – | 5 | 3 | – | 7 |
| Texas Southern | 2 | – | 5 | 3 | – | 7 |
| Arkansas–Pine Bluff | 1 | – | 6 | 4 | – | 7 |
Championship: Grambling State 38, Alabama State 31
$ – Conference champion; x – Division champion/co-champions; y – Championship game participant; Rankings from The Sports Network Poll

The 2001 Grambling State Tigers football team represented Grambling State University as a member of the Southwestern Athletic Conference (SWAC) during the 2001 NCAA Division I-AA football season. Led by fourth-year head coach Doug Williams, the Tigers compiled an overall record of 10–1 and a mark of 6–1 in conference play, won the SWAC championship, and a black college football national championship.

== Schedule ==
| Date | Opponent | Rank | Site | Result | Attendance | Source |
|---|---|---|---|---|---|---|
| September 1 | at Alcorn State | No. 15 | Jack Spinks Stadium; Lorman, MS | W 37–22 | 17,500 | |
| September 8 | Alabama A&M | No. 14 | Eddie G. Robinson Memorial Stadium; Grambling, LA | W 30–7 | 7,432 | |
| September 15 | vs. No. 9 Florida A&M* | No. 15 | Paul Brown Stadium; Cincinnati, OH (Riverfront Classic) | Canceled | N/A | |
| September 22 | at No. 17 Portland State* | No. 15 | PGE Park; Portland, OR (Vanport Classic) | W 30–29 | 16,171 | |
| September 29 | vs. Prairie View A&M | No. 11 | Cotton Bowl; Dallas, TX (rivalry) | W 40–6 | 51,149 | |
| October 13 | vs. Arkansas–Pine Bluff | No. 7 | Independence Stadium; Shreveport, LA (Red River Classic) | W 60–7 | 18,000 | |
| October 20 | at Jackson State | No. 6 | Mississippi Veterans Memorial Stadium; Jackson, MS | W 30–16 | 25,600 | |
| October 27 | Texas Southern^{†} | No. 6 | Eddie G. Robinson Memorial Stadium; Grambling, LA | W 43–3 | 22,736 | |
| November 3 | at Alabama State | No. 3 | Cramton Bowl; Montgomery, AL | L 38–45 | 13,029 | |
| November 10 | at Nicholls State* | No. 9 | John L. Guidry Stadium; Thibodaux, LA | W 38–27 | 7,371 | |
| November 24 | vs. Southern | No. 8 | Louisiana Superdome; New Orleans, LA (Bayou Classic) | W 30–20 | 67,435 | |
| December 1 | vs. Alabama State* | No. 7 | Legion Field; Birmingham, AL (SWAC Championship Game) | W 38–31 | 38,487 | |
*Non-conference game; ^{†}Homecoming; Rankings from The Sports Network Poll released prior to the game
