= 2001 Florida Atlantic Owls football team =

American college football season

2001 Florida Atlantic Owls football
- Conference: Independent
- Record: 4–6
- Head coach: Howard Schnellenberger (1st season)
- Offensive coordinator: Larry Seiple (1st season)
- Offensive scheme: Pro-style
- Defensive coordinator: Kirk Hoza (1st season)
- Base defense: 4–3
- Home stadium: Pro Player Stadium

2001 NCAA Division I-AA independents football standings
	Conf.			Overall
Team	W		L	W		L
Cal Poly		–		6	–	5
Saint Mary's		–		6	–	5
Samford		–		5	–	5
Charleston Southern		–		5	–	6
Morris Brown		–		5	–	6
Florida Atlantic		–		4	–	6
Cal State Northridge		–		3	–	7
Liberty		–		3	–	8
Savannah State		–		2	–	7
Elon		–		2	–	9
Southern Utah		–		2	–	9

The 2001 Florida Atlantic Owls football team represented Florida Atlantic University (FAU) as an independent during the 2001 NCAA Division I-AA football season. Led by first-year head coach Howard Schnellenberger, the Owls compiled a record of 4–6 in the inaugural season for the program. Florida Atlantic played home games at Pro Player Stadium in Miami Gardens, Florida.

Schnellenberger started from scratch in 1998, working out of a trailer and holding practices in local high school gymnasiums.

== Schedule ==
Date	Time	Opponent	Site	Result	Attendance	Source
September 1	4:00 p.m.	No. 19 (DII) Slippery Rock	Pro Player Stadium; Miami Gardens, FL	L 7–40	25,632	
September 8	7:00 p.m.	at Bethune–Cookman	Municipal Stadium; Daytona Beach, FL	W 31–28	7,621	
September 15		at James Madison	Bridgeforth Stadium; Harrisonburg, VA	Canceled		
September 22	4:00 p.m.	Marist	Pro Player Stadium; Miami Gardens, FL	W 31–9	12,559	
October 6	2:00 p.m.	at Drake	Drake Stadium; Des Moines, IA	L 7–31	4,125	
October 13	4:00 p.m.	Jacksonville	Pro Player Stadium; Miami Gardens, FL	W 35–12	10,295	
October 20	4:00 p.m.	Saint Mary's	Pro Player Stadium; Miami Gardens, FL	L 10–24	10,143	
October 27	4:00 p.m.	Saint Peter's	Pro Player Stadium; Miami Gardens, FL	L 0–19	9,757	
November 3	1:30 p.m.	at Gardner–Webb	Ernest W. Spangler Stadium; Boiling Springs, NC	L 19–35	3,421	
November 10	4:00 p.m.	No. 4 Eastern Illinois	Pro Player Stadium; Miami Gardens, FL	L 10–38	10,286	
November 17	4:00 p.m.	Albany	Pro Player Stadium; Miami Gardens, FL	W 27–9	12,239	
Rankings from The Sports Network Poll released prior to the game
