= 2001 Delaware State Hornets football team =

American college football season

2001 Delaware State Hornets football
- Conference: Mid-Eastern Athletic Conference
- Record: 5–6 (3–5 MEAC)
- Head coach: Ben Blacknall (2nd season)
- Home stadium: Alumni Stadium

2001 Mid-Eastern Athletic Conference football standings
	Conf.			Overall
Team	W		L	W		L
No. 22 Florida A&M $^	7	–	1	7	–	4
Hampton	6	–	2	7	–	4
North Carolina A&T	5	–	3	8	–	3
Bethune–Cookman	5	–	3	6	–	4
South Carolina State	5	–	3	6	–	5
Delaware State	3	–	5	5	–	6
Norfolk State	3	–	5	5	–	6
Howard	1	–	7	2	–	9
Morgan State	1	–	7	2	–	9
$ – Conference champion; ^ – NCAA Division I-AA playoff participant; Rankings from The Sports Network poll

The 2001 Delaware State Hornets football team represented Delaware State University as a member of the Mid-Eastern Athletic Conference (MEAC) during the 2001 NCAA Division I-AA football season. Led by second-year head coach Ben Blacknall, the Hornets compiled an overall record of 5–6, with a mark of 3–5 in conference play, and finished tied for sixth in the MEAC.

== Schedule ==
Date	Opponent	Site	Result	Attendance	Source
September 1	at No. 12 Florida A&M	Bragg Memorial Stadium; Tallahassee, FL	L 17–35	11,421	
September 8	Millersville*	Alumni Stadium; Dover, DE	W 27–19	4,487	
September 22	at Liberty*	Williams Stadium; Lynchburg, VA	L 7–34	8,353	
September 29	at Hampton	Armstrong Stadium; Hampton, VA	L 20–31	6,636	
October 6	vs. Bethune–Cookman	Veterans Stadium; Philadelphia, PA (Richard Allen Classic)	L 24–49		
October 20	Morgan State^{†}	Alumni Stadium; Dover, DE	W 38–12	5,189	
October 27	at South Carolina State	Oliver C. Dawson Stadium; Orangeburg, SC	L 21–42	14,695	
November 3	at Savannah State*	Ted Wright Stadium; Savannah, GA	W 45–22	7,328	
November 10	vs. Norfolk State	Qualcomm Stadium; San Diego, CA (Gold Coast Classic)	W 43–13		
November 17	Howard	Alumni Stadium; Dover, DE	W 43–31	2,787	
November 24	at North Carolina A&T	Aggie Stadium; Greensboro, NC	L 30–36		
*Non-conference game; ^{†}Homecoming; Rankings from The Sports Network Poll released prior to the game
