= 2001 Appalachian State Mountaineers football team =

American college football season

2001 Appalachian State Mountaineers football

NCAA Division I-AA Quarterfinal, L 24–38 at Georgia Southern
- Conference: Southern Conference

Ranking
- Sports Network: No. 4
- Record: 9–4 (6–2 SoCon)
- Head coach: Jerry Moore (13th season)
- Home stadium: Kidd Brewer Stadium

2001 Southern Conference football standings
	Conf.			Overall
Team	W		L	W		L
No. 2 Furman $^	7	–	1	12	–	3
No. 3 Georgia Southern $^	7	–	1	12	–	2
No. 6 Appalachian State ^	6	–	2	9	–	4
Western Carolina	5	–	3	7	–	4
East Tennessee State	4	–	4	6	–	5
Wofford	3	–	5	4	–	7
The Citadel	2	–	6	3	–	7
Chattanooga	1	–	7	3	–	8
VMI	1	–	7	1	–	10
$ – Conference champion; ^ – NCAA Division I-AA playoff participant; Rankings from The Sports Network I-AA Poll

The 2001 Appalachian State Mountaineers football team was an American football team that represented Appalachian State University as a member of the Southern Conference (SoCon) during the 2001 NCAA Division I-AA football season. In their 13th year under head coach Jerry Moore, the Mountaineers compiled an overall record of 9–4, with a conference mark of 6–2. Appalachian State advanced to the NCAA Division I-AA Football Championship playoffs, where they defeated William & Mary in the first round and lost to Georgia Southern in the quarterfinals.

== Schedule ==
Date	Time	Opponent	Rank	Site	TV	Result	Attendance	Source
September 1	7:00 p.m.	Liberty*	No. 5	Kidd Brewer Stadium; Boone, NC		W 46–26	10,331	
September 8	6:30 p.m.	at Wake Forest*	No. 3	Groves Stadium; Winston-Salem, NC		L 10–20	29,127	
September 15		at Troy State*		Veterans Memorial Stadium; Troy, AL		Canceled		
September 22	4:00 p.m.	at The Citadel	No. 5	Johnson Hagood Stadium; Charleston, SC		W 8–6	15,107	
September 29	2:00 p.m.	East Tennessee State	No. 6	Kidd Brewer Stadium; Boone, NC		W 33–14	16,567	
October 6	3:00 p.m.	at No. 3 Furman	No. 5	Paladin Stadium; Greenville, SC	CCSS	L 22–28	14,411	
October 13	3:30 p.m.	No. 1 Georgia Southern	No. 8	Kidd Brewer Stadium; Boone, NC (rivalry)		L 18–27	15,331	
October 20	6:00 p.m.	at Wofford	No. 12	Gibbs Stadium; Spartanburg, SC		W 34–23	9,419	
October 27	2:00 p.m.	Chattanooga	No. 12	Kidd Brewer Stadium; Boone, NC		W 51–14	15,337	
November 3	1:00 p.m.	at VMI	No. 11	Alumni Memorial Field; Lexington, VA		W 27–17	5,353	
November 10	2:00 p.m.	Western Carolina	No. 9	Kidd Brewer Stadium; Boone, NC (rivalry)		W 34–24	17,779	
November 17	2:00 p.m.	West Virginia Tech*	No. 9	Kidd Brewer Stadium; Boone, NC		W 64–14	5,353	
December 1	1:00 p.m.	No. 17 William & Mary*	No. 8	Kidd Brewer Stadium; Boone, NC (NCAA Division I-AA First Round)		W 40–27	5,279	
December 8	12:00 p.m.	at No. 2 Georgia Southern*	No. 8	Paulson Stadium; Statesboro, GA (NCAA Division I-AA Quarterfinal)		L 24–38	9,352	
*Non-conference game; Rankings from The Sports Network Poll released prior to the game; All times are in Eastern time
