= 2001 Southern Jaguars football team =

American college football season

2001 Southern Jaguars football
- Conference: Southwestern Athletic Conference
- West Division
- Record: 7–4 (5–2 SWAC)
- Head coach: Pete Richardson (9th season)
- Defensive coordinator: Terrence Graves (2nd season)
- Home stadium: A. W. Mumford Stadium

2001 Southwestern Athletic Conference football standings
| | Conf. | | | Overall |
| Team | W | | L | W | | L |
|---|---|---|---|---|---|---|
East Division
| Alabama State xy | 6 | – | 1 | 8 | – | 4 |
| Jackson State | 5 | – | 2 | 7 | – | 4 |
| Alcorn State | 5 | – | 2 | 6 | – | 5 |
| Alabama A&M | 3 | – | 4 | 4 | – | 7 |
| Mississippi Valley State | 0 | – | 7 | 0 | – | 11 |
West Division
| No. 8 Grambling State xy$ | 6 | – | 1 | 10 | – | 1 |
| Southern | 5 | – | 2 | 7 | – | 4 |
| Prairie View A&M | 2 | – | 5 | 3 | – | 7 |
| Texas Southern | 2 | – | 5 | 3 | – | 7 |
| Arkansas–Pine Bluff | 1 | – | 6 | 4 | – | 7 |
Championship: Grambling State 38, Alabama State 31
$ – Conference champion; x – Division champion/co-champions; y – Championship game participant; Rankings from The Sports Network Poll

The 2001 Southern Jaguars football team represented Southern University as a member of the Southwestern Athletic Conference (SWAC) during the 2001 NCAA Division I-AA football season. Led by ninth-year head coach Pete Richardson, the Jaguars compiled an overall record of 7–4, with a conference record of 5–2, and finished second in the SWAC West Division.

== Schedule ==
| Date | Opponent | Site | Result | Attendance | Source |
|---|---|---|---|---|---|
| September 1 | Northwestern State* | A. W. Mumford Stadium; Baton Rouge, LA | L 21–30 | | |
| September 8 | Arkansas–Pine Bluff | A. W. Mumford Stadium; Baton Rouge, LA | W 35–14 | | |
| September 22 | vs. Alabama State | Ladd–Peebles Stadium; Mobile, AL (Gulf Coast Classic) | W 32–7 | 26,543 | |
| September 29 | at Tulane* | Louisiana Superdome; New Orleans, LA | L 7–41 | 41,319 | |
| October 6 | Alabama A&M | A. W. Mumford Stadium; Baton Rouge, LA | W 12–29 | | |
| October 13 | at Jackson State | Mississippi Veterans Memorial Stadium; Jackson, MS (rivalry) | L 21–24 | | |
| October 27 | vs. Mississippi Valley State | Independence Stadium; Shreveport, LA (Port City Classic) | W 49–0 | | |
| November 3 | at No. 20 Florida A&M* | Bragg Memorial Stadium; Tallahassee, FL | W 17–14 ^{OT} | 17,123 | |
| November 10 | at Texas Southern | Reliant Astrodome; Houston, TX | W 7–6 | | |
| November 17 | Prairie View A&M | A. W. Mumford Stadium; Baton Rouge, LA | W 43–28 | | |
| November 24 | vs. No. 8 Grambling State | Louisiana Superdome; New Orleans, LA (Bayou Classic) | L 20–30 | 67,435 | |
*Non-conference game; Rankings from The Sports Network Poll released prior to the game
