= 2001 Monmouth Hawks football team =

American college football season

2001 Monmouth Hawks football
- Conference: Northeast Conference
- Record: 7–3 (5–2 NEC)
- Head coach: Kevin Callahan (9th season)
- Offensive coordinator: Greg Boyce (1st season)
- Offensive scheme: Multiple
- Defensive coordinator: Andy Bobik (8th season)
- Base defense: 4–3
- Home stadium: Kessler Field

2001 Northeast Conference football standings
	Conf.			Overall
Team	W		L	W		L
Sacred Heart $	8	–	0	11	–	0
Robert Morris	6	–	1	6	–	3
Albany	5	–	2	7	–	3
Monmouth	5	–	2	7	–	3
Stony Brook	3	–	5	3	–	6
Wagner	3	–	5	3	–	6
Central Connecticut State	2	–	5	2	–	7
St. John's	1	–	6	1	–	9
Saint Francis (PA)	0	–	7	0	–	10
$ – Conference champion

The 2001 Monmouth Hawks football team represented Monmouth University in the 2001 NCAA Division I-AA football season as a member of the Northeast Conference (NEC). The Hawks were led by ninth-year head coach Kevin Callahan and played their home games at Kessler Field. They finished the season 7–3 overall and 5–2 in NEC play to tie for third place. Monmouth's September 15 game at Robert Morris was canceled due to college football's collective decision to postpone games following the September 11 attacks.

== Schedule ==
Date	Time	Opponent	Site	Result	Attendance
September 8	1:00 p.m.	Wagner	Kessler Field; West Long Branch, NJ	W 23–15	2,854
September 15		Robert Morris	Kessler Field; West Long Branch, NJ	Canceled	
September 22	1:00 p.m.	at Central Connecticut State	Arute Field; New Britain, CT	W 20–14	1,910
September 29	1:00 p.m.	Canisius*	Kessler Field; West Long Branch, NJ	W 42–0	
October 6	1:00 p.m.	C.W. Post*	Kessler Field; West Long Branch, NJ	L 12–31	1,017
October 13	1:00 p.m.	at Saint Francis (PA)	Pine Bowl; Loretto, PA	W 28–0	683
October 20	12:30 p.m.	at Stony Brook	Seawolves Field; Stony Brook, NY	W 33–14	3,564
October 27	1:00 p.m.	at Towson*	Towson Stadium; Towson, MD	W 24–17	3,864
November 3	1:00 p.m.	Albany	Kessler Field; West Long Branch, NJ	L 10–19	3,890
November 10	1:00 p.m.	St. John's	Kessler Field; West Long Branch, NJ	W 34–0	2,289
November 17	12:30 p.m.	at Sacred Heart	Campus Field; Fairfield, CT	L 14–44	3,000
*Non-conference game; All times are in Eastern time
