= 2001 Jackson State Tigers football team =

American college football season

2001 Jackson State Tigers football
- Conference: Southwestern Athletic Conference
- East Division
- Record: 8–3 (6–1 SWAC)
- Head coach: Judge Hughes (3rd season)
- Home stadium: Mississippi Veterans Memorial Stadium

2001 Southwestern Athletic Conference football standings
	Conf.			Overall
Team	W		L	W		L
East Division
Alabama State xy	6	–	1	8	–	4
Jackson State	5	–	2	7	–	4
Alcorn State	5	–	2	6	–	5
Alabama A&M	3	–	4	4	–	7
Mississippi Valley State	0	–	7	0	–	11
West Division
No. 8 Grambling State xy$	6	–	1	10	–	1
Southern	5	–	2	7	–	4
Prairie View A&M	2	–	5	3	–	7
Texas Southern	2	–	5	3	–	7
Arkansas–Pine Bluff	1	–	6	4	–	7
Championship: Grambling State 38, Alabama State 31
$ – Conference champion; x – Division champion/co-champions; y – Championship game participant; Rankings from The Sports Network Poll

The 2001 Jackson State Tigers football team represented Jackson State University as a member of the Southwestern Athletic Conference (SWAC) during the 2001 NCAA Division I-AA football season. Led by third-year head coach Judge Hughes, the Tigers compiled an overall record of 8–3 and a mark of 6–1 in conference play, and finished second in the SWAC East Division.

== Schedule ==
Date	Opponent	Site	Result	Attendance	Source
September 1	vs. Howard*	Soldier Field; Chicago, IL (Walter Payton Classic)	W 27–17		
September 22	at Mississippi Valley State	Rice–Totten Stadium; Itta Bena, MS	W 66–36		
September 29	at Alabama A&M	Louis Crews Stadium; Normal, AL	W 26–14		
October 6	Alabama State	Mississippi Veterans Memorial Stadium; Jackson, MS	W 58–61 (forfeit win)		
October 13	Southern	Mississippi Veterans Memorial Stadium; Jackson, MS (rivalry)	W 24–21		
October 20	No. 6 Grambling State	Mississippi Veterans Memorial Stadium; Jackson, MS	L 16–30	25,600	
October 27	Arkansas–Pine Bluff	Mississippi Veterans Memorial Stadium; Jackson, MS	W 14–9	15,500	
November 3	vs. No. 14 North Carolina A&T*	Georgia Dome; Atlanta, GA (Peach State Classic)	L 35–42	35,742	
November 10	at Prairie View A&M	Edward L. Blackshear Field; Prairie View, TX	W 38–20	2,109	
November 17	Alcorn State	Mississippi Veterans Memorial Stadium; Jackson, MS (Capital City Classic)	W 52–28		
November 22	vs. Tennessee State*	Liberty Bowl Memorial Stadium; Memphis, TN (Southern Heritage Classic)	L 33–64	28,690	
*Non-conference game; Rankings from The Sports Network Poll released prior to the game
