= 2001 North Carolina A&T Aggies football team =

American college football season

2001 North Carolina A&T Aggies football
- Conference: Mid-Eastern Athletic Conference
- Record: 8–3 (5–3 MEAC)
- Head coach: Bill Hayes (14th season)
- Home stadium: Aggie Stadium

2001 Mid-Eastern Athletic Conference football standings
	Conf.			Overall
Team	W		L	W		L
No. 22 Florida A&M $^	7	–	1	7	–	4
Hampton	6	–	2	7	–	4
North Carolina A&T	5	–	3	8	–	3
Bethune–Cookman	5	–	3	6	–	4
South Carolina State	5	–	3	6	–	5
Delaware State	3	–	5	5	–	6
Norfolk State	3	–	5	5	–	6
Howard	1	–	7	2	–	9
Morgan State	1	–	7	2	–	9
$ – Conference champion; ^ – NCAA Division I-AA playoff participant; Rankings from The Sports Network poll

The 2001 North Carolina A&T Aggies football team represented North Carolina A&T State University as a member of the Mid-Eastern Athletic Conference (MEAC) during the 2001 NCAA Division I-AA football season. Led by 14th-year head coach Bill Hayes, the Aggies compiled an overall record of 8–3, with a mark of 5–3 in conference play, and finished tied for third in the MEAC.

== Schedule ==
Date	Opponent	Rank	Site	Result	Attendance	Source
September 1	vs. North Carolina Central*	No. 25	Carter–Finley Stadium; Raleigh, NC (rivalry)	W 22–0	36,438	
September 22	at Elon*		Rhodes Stadium; Elon, NC	W 23–7	10,450	
September 29	at Norfolk State		William "Dick" Price Stadium; Norfolk, VA	W 43–0	11,023	
October 6	at Morgan State	No. 23	Hughes Stadium; Baltimore, MD	L 42–52		
October 13	No. 16 Florida A&M		Aggie Stadium; Greensboro, NC	W 55–23	34,769	
October 20	Howard	No. 23	Aggie Stadium; Greensboro, NC	W 76–30	14,498	
October 27	at No. 25 Bethune–Cookman	No. 19	Municipal Stadium; Daytona Beach, FL	W 16–14	16,725	
November 3	vs. Jackson State*	No. 14	Georgia Dome; Atlanta, GA (Peach State Classic)	W 42–35	35,742	
November 10	Hampton	No. 12	Aggie Stadium; Greensboro, NC	L 7–23		
November 17	at South Carolina State	No. 22	Oliver C. Dawson Stadium; Orangeburg, SC (rivalry)	L 14–15	9,704	
November 24	Delaware State		Aggie Stadium; Greensboro, NC	W 36–30		
*Non-conference game; Rankings from The Sports Network Poll released prior to the game
