= 2001 VMI Keydets football team =

American college football season

2001 VMI Keydets football
- Conference: Southern Conference
- Record: 1–10 (1–7 SoCon)
- Head coach: Cal McCombs (3rd season)
- Offensive coordinator: Bob Gatling (3rd season)
- Home stadium: Alumni Memorial Field

2001 Southern Conference football standings
	Conf.			Overall
Team	W		L	W		L
No. 2 Furman $^	7	–	1	12	–	3
No. 3 Georgia Southern $^	7	–	1	12	–	2
No. 6 Appalachian State ^	6	–	2	9	–	4
Western Carolina	5	–	3	7	–	4
East Tennessee State	4	–	4	6	–	5
Wofford	3	–	5	4	–	7
The Citadel	2	–	6	3	–	7
Chattanooga	1	–	7	3	–	8
VMI	1	–	7	1	–	10
$ – Conference champion; ^ – NCAA Division I-AA playoff participant; Rankings from The Sports Network I-AA Poll

The 2001 VMI Keydets football team represented the Virginia Military Institute during the 2001 NCAA Division I-AA football season. It was the Keydets' 111th year of football and third season under head coach Cal McCombs. VMI went 1–10 on the year, with the lone win coming over Chattanooga in overtime.

== Schedule ==
Date	Time	Opponent	Site	Result	Attendance	Source
August 30	7:00 p.m.	at Duquesne*	Arthur J. Rooney Athletic Field; Pittsburgh, PA	L 18–41	5,030	
September 8	1:00 p.m.	No. 17 William & Mary*	Alumni Memorial Field; Lexington, VA (rivalry)	L 0–34	5,722	
September 22	7:00 p.m.	at No. 4 Furman	Paladin Stadium; Greenville, SC	L 7–65	10,152	
September 29	12:30 p.m.	No. 1 Georgia Southern	Alumni Memorial Field; Lexington, VA	L 14–31	4,952	
October 6	1:30 p.m.	at Wofford	Gibbs Stadium; Spartanburg, SC	L 14–59	9,314	
October 13	1:00 p.m.	Chattanooga	Alumni Memorial Field; Lexington, VA	W 19–16 ^{OT}	7,622	
October 27	2:00 p.m.	at Western Carolina	E. J. Whitmire Stadium; Cullowhee, NC	L 17–44	7,149	
November 3	1:00 p.m.	No. 11 Appalachian State	Alumni Memorial Field; Lexington, VA	L 17–27	5,353	
November 10	2:00 p.m.	at The Citadel	Johnson Hagood Stadium; Charleston, SC (Military Classic of the South)	L 7–49	18,937	
November 17	1:00 p.m.	Samford	Alumni Memorial Field; Lexington, VA	L 28–46	4,355	
November 22	12:00 p.m.	East Tennessee State	Alumni Memorial Field; Lexington, VA	L 23–34	3,125	
*Non-conference game; Rankings from The Sports Network Poll released prior to the game; All times are in Eastern time
