= 2001 Samford Bulldogs football team =

American college football season

2001 Samford Bulldogs football
- Conference: Independent
- Record: 5–5
- Head coach: Pete Hurt (8th season; first 5 games); Bill Gray (interim, games 6–10)
- Offensive coordinator: Bill Gray (1st season)
- Co-defensive coordinators: Richard Koehler (2nd season); Mike O'Toole (2nd season)
- Home stadium: Seibert Stadium

2001 NCAA Division I-AA independents football standings
| | Conf. | | | Overall |
| Team | W | | L | W | | L |
|---|---|---|---|---|---|---|
| Cal Poly | | – | | 6 | – | 5 |
| Saint Mary's | | – | | 6 | – | 5 |
| Samford | | – | | 5 | – | 5 |
| Charleston Southern | | – | | 5 | – | 6 |
| Morris Brown | | – | | 5 | – | 6 |
| Florida Atlantic | | – | | 4 | – | 6 |
| Cal State Northridge | | – | | 3 | – | 7 |
| Liberty | | – | | 3 | – | 8 |
| Savannah State | | – | | 2 | – | 7 |
| Elon | | – | | 2 | – | 9 |
| Southern Utah | | – | | 2 | – | 9 |

The 2001 Samford Bulldogs football team represented Samford University as an independent during the 2000 NCAA Division I-AA football season, and the Bulldogs compiled an overall record of 4–7. The team played home games at Seibert Stadium in Homewood, Alabama. Eighth-year head coach Pete Hurt led Samford to a 1–4 record before he was fired mid-season. Bill Gray served as head coach for the remainder of the season and went 4–1.

== Schedule ==
| Date | Time | Opponent | Site | Result | Attendance | Source |
|---|---|---|---|---|---|---|
| August 30 | 7:00 p.m. | Chattanooga | Seibert Stadium; Homewood, AL | L 14–28 | 6,403 | |
| September 15 | 11:00 a.m. | Tennessee Tech | Seibert Stadium; Homewood, AL | Canceled | N/A | |
| September 22 | 5:00 p.m. | at Gardner–Webb | Ernest W. Spangler Stadium; Boiling Springs, NC | W 49–41 ^{3OT} | 4,278 | |
| September 29 | 6:30 p.m. | at Nicholls State | John L. Guidry Stadium; Thibodaux, LA | L 16–20 | 4,281 | |
| October 6 | 6:00 p.m. | Jacksonville State | Seibert Stadium; Homewood, AL (rivalry) | L 7–39 | 8,235 | |
| October 13 | 1:30 p.m. | at Alcorn State | Jack Spinks Stadium; Lorman, MS | L 7–17 | 1,000 | |
| October 20 | 12:30 p.m. | at Charleston Southern | Buccaneer Field; North Charleston, SC | W 45–24 | | |
| October 27 | 1:00 p.m. | Tennessee–Martin^{†} | Seibert Stadium; Homewood, AL | W 31–8 | 5,542 | |
| November 3 | 1:00 p.m. | Elon | Seibert Stadium; Homewood, AL | W 43–36 | | |
| November 10 | 12:00 p.m. | at Eastern Kentucky | Roy Kidd Stadium; Richmond, KY | L 11–33 | 6,100 | |
| November 17 | 12:00 p.m. | at VMI | Alumni Memorial Field; Lexington, VA | W 46–28 | 4,355 | |
^{†}Homecoming; All times are in Central time
