= 2001 Georgia Southern Eagles football team =

American college football season

2001 Georgia Southern Eagles football

SoCon co-champion

NCAA Division I-AA Semifinal, L 17–24 vs. Furman
- Conference: Southern Conference

Ranking
- Sports Network: No. 3
- Record: 12–2 (7–1 SoCon)
- Head coach: Paul Johnson (5th season)
- Offensive coordinator: Mike Sewak (5th season)
- Offensive scheme: Triple option
- Defensive coordinator: Rusty Russell (5th season)
- Base defense: 4–3
- Home stadium: Paulson Stadium

2001 Southern Conference football standings
	Conf.			Overall
Team	W		L	W		L
No. 2 Furman $^	7	–	1	12	–	3
No. 3 Georgia Southern $^	7	–	1	12	–	2
No. 6 Appalachian State ^	6	–	2	9	–	4
Western Carolina	5	–	3	7	–	4
East Tennessee State	4	–	4	6	–	5
Wofford	3	–	5	4	–	7
The Citadel	2	–	6	3	–	7
Chattanooga	1	–	7	3	–	8
VMI	1	–	7	1	–	10
$ – Conference champion; ^ – NCAA Division I-AA playoff participant; Rankings from The Sports Network I-AA Poll

The 2001 Georgia Southern Eagles football team represented the Georgia Southern University as a member of the Southern Conference (SoCon) during the 2001 NCAA Division I-AA football season. Led by Paul Johnson in his fifth and final year as head coach, the Eagles compiled an overall record of 12–2 with a mark of 7–1 in conference play, sharing the SoCon title with Furman. Georgia Southern advanced to the NCAA Division I-AA Football Championship playoffs, where they defeated Florida A&M in the first round and Appalachian State in the quarterfinals before falling to Furman in the semifinals. Eagles played their home games at Paulson Stadium in Statesboro, Georgia.

== Schedule ==
Date	Time	Opponent	Rank	Site	TV	Result	Attendance	Source
September 1	7:00 pm	Savannah State*	No. 1	Paulson Stadium; Statesboro, GA		W 69–6	23,167	
September 8	12:00 pm	No. 15 Delaware*	No. 1	Paulson Stadium; Statesboro, GA		W 38–7	16,105	
September 22	1:00 pm	Chattanooga	No. 1	Paulson Stadium; Statesboro, GA		W 70–7	14,656	
September 29	12:30 pm	at VMI	No. 1	Alumni Memorial Field; Lexington, VA		W 31–14	4,952	
October 6	1:00 pm	Western Carolina	No. 1	Paulson Stadium; Statesboro, GA		W 50–14	17,804	
October 13	3:30 pm	at No. 8 Appalachian State	No. 1	Kidd Brewer Stadium; Boone, NC (rivalry)		W 27–18	15,331	
October 20	1:00 pm	The Citadel	No. 1	Paulson Stadium; Statesboro, GA		W 36–20	18,637	
October 27	7:00 pm	at East Tennessee State	No. 1	Memorial Center; Johnson City, TN		L 16–19	5,543	
November 3	3:30 pm	No. 2 Furman	No. 4	Paulson Stadium; Statesboro, GA	FSNS	W 20–10	21,593	
November 10	2:00 pm	at Elon*	No. 2	Rhodes Stadium; Elon, NC		W 27–21	10,632	
November 24	1:00 pm	at Wofford	No. 2	Gibbs Stadium; Spartanburg, SC		W 48–10	6,685	
December 1	12:00 pm	No. 22 Florida A&M*	No. 2	Paulson Stadium; Statesboro, GA (NCAA Division I-AA First Round)		W 60–35	9,884	
December 8	12:00 pm	No. 8 Appalachian State*	No. 2	Paulson Stadium; Statesboro, GA (NCAA Division I-AA Quarterfinal)		W 38–24	9,352	
December 15	12:00 p.m.	No. 4 Furman*	No. 2	Paulson Stadium; Statesboro, GA (NCAA Division I-AA Semifinal)	CCSS	L 17–24	11,827	
*Non-conference game; Rankings from The Sports Network Poll released prior to the game; All times are in Eastern time
