= Bill Lacey (American football) =

American football player and coach (born 1971)

Biographical details
- Born: July 27, 1971 (age 55)

Playing career
- 1989–1993: Villanova
- Position: Offensive tackle

Coaching career (HC unless noted)
- 1994: Muhlenberg (OL)
- 1995: Wagner (TE)
- 1996: Bates (OL)
- 1997–1999: Wagner (OL)
- 2000–2001: Sacred Heart (OC/OL)
- 2002–2003: Sacred Heart
- 2004: Villanova (TE)
- 2005: Wagner (OL)

Head coaching record
- Overall: 13–8

Bill Lacey (born July 27, 1971) is an American former college football coach and player. He was the head football coach at Sacred Heart University from 2002 to 2003. He also coached for Muhlenberg, Wagner, Bates, and Villanova. He played college football for Villanova as an offensive tackle.

== Head coaching record ==
Year	Team	Overall	Conference	Standing	Bowl/playoffs
Sacred Heart Pioneers (Northeast Conference) (2002–2003)
2002	Sacred Heart	7–3	5–2	T–2nd	
2003	Sacred Heart	6–5	3–4	T–5th	
Sacred Heart:		13–8	8–6		
Total:		13–8			
