= 2001 NCAA Division I-AA football season =

American college football season

2001 NCAA Division I-AA season

Regular season
- Number of teams: 122
- Duration: August–November
- Payton Award: Brian Westbrook (RB, Villanova)
- Buchanan Award: Derrick Lloyd (LB, James Madison)

Playoff
- Duration: December 1–December 21
- Championship date: December 21, 2001
- Championship site: Finley Stadium; Chattanooga, Tennessee
- Champion: Montana

NCAA Division I-AA football seasons
- «2000 2002»

The 2001 NCAA Division I-AA football season, part of college football in the United States organized by the National Collegiate Athletic Association (NCAA) at the Division I-AA level, began in August 2001, and concluded with the 2001 NCAA Division I-AA Football Championship Game on December 21, 2001, at Finley Stadium in Chattanooga, Tennessee. The Montana Grizzlies won their second I-AA championship, defeating the Furman Paladins by a score of 13–6.

== Conference changes and new programs ==
School	2000 Conference	2001 Conference
Austin Peay	I-AA Independent	Pioneer
Cal State Northridge	Big Sky	I-AA Independent
Davidson	I-AA Independent	Pioneer
Florida Atlantic	New Program	I-AA Independent
Georgetown	I-AA Independent	Patriot
Hofstra	I-AA Independent	Atlantic 10
Jacksonville	I-AA Independent	Pioneer
Morehead State	I-AA Independent	Pioneer
Morris Brown	D-II Independent	I-AA Independent
Savannah State	D-II Independent	I-AA Independent
South Florida	I-AA Independent	I-A Independent
Troy State	Southland	I-A Independent
Western Kentucky	Ohio Valley	Gateway

== Conference standings ==
2001 Atlantic 10 Conference football standings
	Conf.			Overall
Team	W		L	W		L
No. 11 Hofstra +^	7	–	2	9	–	3
No. 10 Maine +^	7	–	2	9	–	3
No. 20 Villanova +	7	–	2	8	–	3
No. 17 William & Mary +^	7	–	2	8	–	4
No. 21 Rhode Island	6	–	3	8	–	3
Delaware	4	–	5	4	–	6
Northeastern	4	–	5	5	–	6
UMass	3	–	6	3	–	8
Richmond	3	–	6	3	–	8
New Hampshire	2	–	7	4	–	7
James Madison	0	–	9	2	–	9
+ – Conference co-champions; ^ – NCAA Division I-AA playoff participant; Rankings from The Sports Network poll

2001 Big Sky Conference football standings
	Conf.			Overall
Team	W		L	W		L
No. 1 Montana $^	7	–	0	15	–	1
No. 16 Northern Arizona ^	5	–	2	9	–	4
Portland State	5	–	2	7	–	4
Montana State	4	–	3	5	–	6
Eastern Washington	3	–	4	7	–	4
Weber State	2	–	5	3	–	8
Idaho State	1	–	6	4	–	7
Sacramento State	1	–	6	2	–	9
$ – Conference champion; ^ – NCAA Division I-AA playoff participant; Rankings from The Sports Network poll

2001 Gateway Football Conference standings
	Conf.			Overall
Team	W		L	W		L
No. 4 Northern Iowa $^	6	–	1	11	–	3
No. 12 Western Kentucky ^	5	–	2	8	–	4
No. 15 Youngstown State	5	–	2	8	–	3
Western Illinois	4	–	3	5	–	5
Southwest Missouri State	3	–	4	6	–	5
Indiana State	2	–	5	3	–	8
Illinois State	2	–	5	2	–	9
Southern Illinois	1	–	6	1	–	10
$ – Conference champion; ^ – NCAA Division I-AA playoff participant; Rankings from The Sports Network poll

2001 Ivy League football standings
	Conf.			Overall
Team	W		L	W		L
No. 19 Harvard $	7	–	0	9	–	0
No. 24 Penn	6	–	1	8	–	1
Brown	5	–	2	6	–	3
Princeton	3	–	4	3	–	6
Columbia	3	–	4	3	–	7
Cornell	2	–	5	2	–	7
Dartmouth	1	–	6	1	–	8
Yale	1	–	6	3	–	6
$ – Conference champion; Rankings from The Sports Network poll

2001 Metro Atlantic Athletic Conference football standings
	Conf.			Overall
Team	W		L	W		L
Duquesne $	6	–	0	8	–	3
Saint Peter's	6	–	1	10	–	1
Fairfield	5	–	2	5	–	5
Iona	3	–	3	4	–	5
La Salle	2	–	4	5	–	4
Marist	2	–	4	3	–	6
Siena	1	–	6	1	–	8
Canisius	1	–	6	1	–	9
$ – Conference champion

2001 Mid-Eastern Athletic Conference football standings
	Conf.			Overall
Team	W		L	W		L
No. 22 Florida A&M $^	7	–	1	7	–	4
Hampton	6	–	2	7	–	4
North Carolina A&T	5	–	3	8	–	3
Bethune–Cookman	5	–	3	6	–	4
South Carolina State	5	–	3	6	–	5
Delaware State	3	–	5	5	–	6
Norfolk State	3	–	5	5	–	6
Howard	1	–	7	2	–	9
Morgan State	1	–	7	2	–	9
$ – Conference champion; ^ – NCAA Division I-AA playoff participant; Rankings from The Sports Network poll

2001 Northeast Conference football standings
	Conf.			Overall
Team	W		L	W		L
Sacred Heart $	8	–	0	11	–	0
Robert Morris	6	–	1	6	–	3
Albany	5	–	2	7	–	3
Monmouth	5	–	2	7	–	3
Stony Brook	3	–	5	3	–	6
Wagner	3	–	5	3	–	6
Central Connecticut State	2	–	5	2	–	7
St. John's	1	–	6	1	–	9
Saint Francis (PA)	0	–	7	0	–	10
$ – Conference champion

2001 Ohio Valley Conference football standings
	Conf.			Overall
Team	W		L	W		L
No. 9 Eastern Illinois $^	6	–	0	9	–	1
No. 18 Eastern Kentucky	5	–	1	8	–	2
No. 23 Tennessee Tech	4	–	2	7	–	3
No. 25 Tennessee State	3	–	3	8	–	3
Murray State	2	–	4	4	–	6
Southeast Missouri State	1	–	5	4	–	7
Tennessee–Martin	0	–	6	1	–	10
$ – Conference champion; ^ – NCAA Division I-AA playoff participant; Rankings from The Sports Network poll

2001 Patriot League football standings
	Conf.			Overall
Team	W		L	W		L
No. 5 Lehigh $^	7	–	0	11	–	1
Colgate	5	–	1	7	–	3
Fordham	5	–	2	7	–	4
Bucknell	4	–	3	6	–	4
Holy Cross	3	–	4	4	–	6
Towson	2	–	5	3	–	7
Lafayette	1	–	6	2	–	8
Georgetown	0	–	6	3	–	7
$ – Conference champion; ^ – NCAA Division I-AA playoff participant; Rankings from The Sports Network poll

2001 Pioneer Football League standings
	Conf.			Overall
Team	W		L	W		L
North Division
Dayton xy$	3	–	0	10	–	1
Butler	2	–	2	5	–	5
San Diego	2	–	2	6	–	3
Drake	1	–	3	5	–	5
Valparaiso	1	–	3	3	–	8
South Division
Jacksonville xy	3	–	0	6	–	5
Morehead State	2	–	1	6	–	5
Davidson	1	–	2	5	–	4
Austin Peay	0	–	3	3	–	7
Championship: Dayton 46, Jacksonville 14
$ – Conference champion; x – Division champion/co-champions; y – Championship game participant

2001 Southern Conference football standings
	Conf.			Overall
Team	W		L	W		L
No. 2 Furman $^	7	–	1	12	–	3
No. 3 Georgia Southern $^	7	–	1	12	–	2
No. 6 Appalachian State ^	6	–	2	9	–	4
Western Carolina	5	–	3	7	–	4
East Tennessee State	4	–	4	6	–	5
Wofford	3	–	5	4	–	7
The Citadel	2	–	6	3	–	7
Chattanooga	1	–	7	3	–	8
VMI	1	–	7	1	–	10
$ – Conference champion; ^ – NCAA Division I-AA playoff participant; Rankings from The Sports Network I-AA Poll

2001 Southland Football League standings
	Conf.			Overall
Team	W		L	W		L
No. 7 Sam Houston State +^	5	–	1	10	–	3
No. 13 McNeese State +^	5	–	1	8	–	4
No. 14 Northwestern State ^	4	–	2	8	–	4
Stephen F. Austin	4	–	2	6	–	5
Jacksonville State	2	–	4	5	–	6
Nicholls State	1	–	5	3	–	8
Southwest Texas State	0	–	6	4	–	7
+ – Conference co-champions; ^ – NCAA Division I-AA playoff participant; Rankings from The Sports Network poll

2001 Southwestern Athletic Conference football standings
	Conf.			Overall
Team	W		L	W		L
East Division
Alabama State xy	6	–	1	8	–	4
Jackson State	5	–	2	7	–	4
Alcorn State	5	–	2	6	–	5
Alabama A&M	3	–	4	4	–	7
Mississippi Valley State	0	–	7	0	–	11
West Division
No. 8 Grambling State xy$	6	–	1	10	–	1
Southern	5	–	2	7	–	4
Prairie View A&M	2	–	5	3	–	7
Texas Southern	2	–	5	3	–	7
Arkansas–Pine Bluff	1	–	6	4	–	7
Championship: Grambling State 38, Alabama State 31
$ – Conference champion; x – Division champion/co-champions; y – Championship game participant; Rankings from The Sports Network Poll

2001 NCAA Division I-AA independents football standings
	Conf.			Overall
Team	W		L	W		L
Cal Poly		–		6	–	5
Saint Mary's		–		6	–	5
Samford		–		5	–	5
Charleston Southern		–		5	–	6
Morris Brown		–		5	–	6
Florida Atlantic		–		4	–	6
Cal State Northridge		–		3	–	7
Liberty		–		3	–	8
Savannah State		–		2	–	7
Elon		–		2	–	9
Southern Utah		–		2	–	9

== Conference champions ==
Conference Champions

Atlantic 10 Conference – Hofstra, Maine, Villanova, and William & Mary
Big Sky Conference – Montana
Gateway Football Conference – Northern Iowa
Ivy League – Harvard
Metro Atlantic Athletic Conference – Duquesne
Mid-Eastern Athletic Conference – Florida A&M
Northeast Conference – Sacred Heart
Ohio Valley Conference – Eastern Illinois
Patriot League – Lehigh
Pioneer Football League – Dayton
Southern Conference – Furman and Georgia Southern
Southland Football League – McNeese State and Sam Houston State
Southwestern Athletic Conference – Grambling State

== Postseason ==
=== NCAA Division I-AA playoff bracket ===
The top four teams in the tournament were seeded; seeded teams were assured of hosting games in the first two rounds.

First Round; December 1 Campus sites
1	Montana*	28
Northwestern State	19
Sam Houston State*	34
Northern Arizona	31
McNeese State*	10
Maine	14
4	Eastern Illinois*	43
Northern Iowa	49
2	Georgia Southern*	60
Florida A&M	35
Appalachian State*	40
William & Mary	27
Lehigh*	27*
Hofstra	24
3	Furman*	24
Western Kentucky	20

Quarterfinals; December 8 Campus sites
1	Montana*	49
Sam Houston State	24
Maine	28
Northern Iowa*	56
2	Georgia Southern*	38
Appalachian State	24
Lehigh	17
3	Furman*	34

Semifinals; December 15; Campus sites
1	Montana*	38
Northern Iowa	0
2	Georgia Southern*	17
3	Furman	24

National Championship Game; December 21; Finley Stadium; Chattanooga, TN
1	Montana	13
3	Furman	6

* By team name denotes host institution
* By score denotes overtime
