= Finley Stadium =

Stadium in Tennessee

Coordinates: 35°02′11″N 85°18′57″W

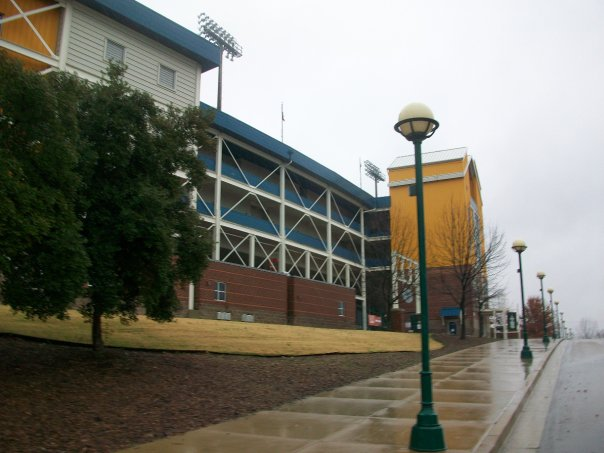
- Exterior view of the stadium in 2009
- Interactive map of Finley Stadium
- Full name: Davenport Field at Finley Stadium
- Address: 1826 Carter Street; Chattanooga, TN; United States
- Owner: City of Chattanooga; Hamilton County; The Stadium Corporation
- Operator: Stadium Corporation
- Capacity: 20,668
- Type: Stadium
- Surface: AstroTurf Gameday Grass
- Current use: Football; Soccer

Construction
- Groundbreaking: March 7, 1996
- Opened: October 18, 1997; 29 years ago
- Cost: $28.5 million ($57.2 million in 2025 dollars)
- Architects: Ellerbe Becket; Derthick, Henly, & Wilkerson
- General contractors: C&I Specialty

Tenants
- Chattanooga Mocs (NCAA) teams: football (1997–present); women's soccer (2010–2018); Professional teams: Chattanooga FC (MLSNP) (2009–present); Tennessee Crush (former) (NDFL) (2009–?)

Website
- gomocs.com/finley-stadium

Finley Stadium is a stadium located in Chattanooga, Tennessee, United States. Owned by the City of Chattanooga, it has served as home venue for several teams, including the University of Tennessee at Chattanooga's football team and Chattanooga FC (MLS Next Pro), a professional Division 3 soccer team.

The stadium also hosts various high school sports and musical concerts. Opened in 1997, it has a current capacity of 20,412, and hosted the NCAA Division I National Championship Game from its opening season through 2009, after which the game moved to Pizza Hut Park in the Dallas suburb of Frisco, Texas. The stadium will host the TSSAA Football Championships in 2021 and 2022.

The stadium is named in honor of W. Max Finley, former chairman of the Rock Tenn Corporation, who was an alumnus and active supporter of the University of Tennessee system. The playing field is named in honor of Gordon Lee Davenport, the president and CEO of the Krystal Company from 1975 to 1985 who served as Chairman of the Stadium Corporation and Campaign and worked endlessly and tirelessly in the planning and actual development of the facility. Bronze busts of both Finley and Davenport adorn the main entryway to the stadium.

== History ==
In 1997, the University of Tennessee at Chattanooga football program stopped using Chamberlain Field and started using Finley-Davenport. On Oct. 18, 1997, the Mocs opened up their new home, Finley Stadium Davenport Field, as an overflow crowd of 22,646 watched UTC defeat Tennessee State 28-7.

The 20,412-seat facility (original capacity: 20,668) is part of the city's Southside revitalization project. A stadium project for UTC and Chattanooga had been talked about by city leaders for quite some time before it came to fruition. Chamberlain Field on the UTC campus, which opened in 1908, had the distinction of being the second-oldest on-campus stadium in the nation. Officials agreed that something needed to be done.

The $28.5 million project needed supporters to become a reality and got plenty of them. Donations from the private sector ranged anywhere from a 10 dollar bill to $1 million. In fact, nearly 40 percent, or $10.2 million of the project, came from private donations. The City of Chattanooga and Hamilton County contributed $13 million, the State of Tennessee gave $3.5 million, and the University donated $2.9 million.

Ground breaking on the site that was once the Rock Tenn plant was held March 7, 1996. Seven months later, the Stadium Corporation named the facility Finley Stadium Davenport Field.

In 2015, a new turf surface was installed to replace the old for $600,000 – with the ability to erase football lines or soccer lines depending on the event to be held.

== Features ==
The facility, designed by Derthick, Henley & Wilkerson and built by C&I Specialty, both of Chattanooga, contains 32 luxury sky boxes and 1,566 preferred seats with chairbacks. The $350,000 scoreboard includes a giant matrix screen and the Stadium Club can hold 250 for pregame or postgame functions. The press box can hold 60 media representatives, has three radio booths, and a television broadcast booth. Prior to 2015, on either side of the pressbox was the stadium's "Wall of Champions", featuring a plaque celebrating each of the 13 NCAA Division I FCS teams to have won a championship here. Identical home and visitors locker rooms contain a separate training area and coaches locker room, as well as an extensive player locker area.

Adjacent to the stadium is the First Horizon Pavilion. The old Ross-Meehan Foundry has been renovated into an open-air pavilion which has become a favorite for tailgaters, complete with food and beverage concessions and a children's area.

== Notable events ==
The U.S. Men's National soccer team played a friendly match vs. Jamaica on February 3, 2017 at Finley Stadium. The U.S. defeated Jamaica 1–0.

NCAA Division I Football Championship

Date (notes)	Champion	Score	Runner-up	Att.	Winning head coach
December 20, 1997	Youngstown State (4)	10–9	McNeese State	14,771	Jim Tressel (4)
December 19, 1998	UMass	55–43	Georgia Southern	17,501	Mark Whipple
December 18, 1999	Georgia Southern (5)	59–24	Youngstown State	20,052	Paul Johnson
December 16, 2000	Georgia Southern (6)	27–25	Montana	17,156	Paul Johnson (2)
December 21, 2001	Montana (2)	13–6	Furman	12,698	Joe Glenn
December 20, 2002	Western Kentucky	34–14	McNeese State	12,360	Jack Harbaugh
December 19, 2003	Delaware	40–0	Colgate	14,281	K. C. Keeler
December 17, 2004	James Madison	31–21	Montana	16,771	Mickey Matthews
December 16, 2005	Appalachian State	21–16	Northern Iowa	20,236	Jerry Moore
December 15, 2006	Appalachian State (2)	28–17	UMass	22,808	Jerry Moore (2)
December 14, 2007	Appalachian State (3)	49–21	Delaware	23,010	Jerry Moore (3)
December 19, 2008	Richmond	24–7	Montana	17,823	Mike London
December 18, 2009	Villanova	23–21	Montana	14,328	Andy Talley

== See also ==
- McKenzie Arena
- List of NCAA Division I FCS football stadiums

Preceded by Marshall University Stadium	Host of the NCAA Division I Football Championship; 1997–2009	Succeeded by Toyota Stadium
