= 2002 NFL draft =

2002 American football draft

General information
- Date: April 20–21, 2002
- Time: Noon EDT (April 20); 11:00 a.m. EDT (April 21)
- Location: Theater at MSG in New York City, New York
- Networks: ESPN, ESPN2

Overview
- 261 total selections in 7 rounds
- League: NFL
- First selection: David Carr, QB; Houston Texans
- Mr. Irrelevant: Ahmad Miller, DT; Houston Texans
- Most selections (12): Houston Texans
- Fewest selections (5): Kansas City Chiefs; Miami Dolphins; New York Jets
- Hall of Famers: 3: DE Julius Peppers; DE Dwight Freeney; S Ed Reed

The 2002 NFL draft was the 67th annual meeting of National Football League (NFL) franchises to select newly eligible professional football players. The draft is known officially as the "NFL Annual Player Selection Meeting" and has been conducted annually since 1936. The draft took place from April 20–21, 2002, at the Theater at Madison Square Garden in New York City, New York. The draft was broadcast on ESPN both days and eventually moved to ESPN2. The draft began with the Houston Texans selecting David Carr, and it ended with the Texans selecting Mr. Irrelevant, Ahmad Miller. There were thirty-two compensatory selections distributed among eighteen teams, with the Buffalo Bills receiving the most selections with four. The University of Miami was the college most represented in the draft, having five of its players selected in the first round. Although the Carolina Panthers finished with a 1–15 record which would normally have given them the first pick in each round, the Houston Texans were given the first pick because they were an expansion team. The league also held a supplemental draft after the regular draft and before the regular season.

== Player selections ==
*	Compensatory selection
^	Supplemental compensatory selection
¤	Extra selection awarded to expansion team
†	Pro Bowler
‡	Hall of Famer

Positions key
Offense	Defense	Special teams
QB — Quarterback; RB — Running back; FB — Fullback; WR — Wide receiver; TE — Tight end; OL — Offensive lineman; T — Tackle; G — Guard; C — Center	DL — Defensive lineman; DT — Defensive tackle (Note: Includes nose tackle (NT)); DE — Defensive end; EDGE — Edge rusher; LB — Linebacker (Note: Includes middle linebacker (MLB/MIKE), weakside linebacker (WILL), strongside linebacker (SAM), off-ball linebacker, and outside linebacker (OLB)); DB — Defensive back; CB — Cornerback; S — Safety (Note: Includes free safety (FS) and strong safety (SS))	K — Kicker (Note: Also known as a placekicker (PK)); P — Punter; LS — Long snapper; RS — Return specialist (Note: Includes kickoff and punt returners)

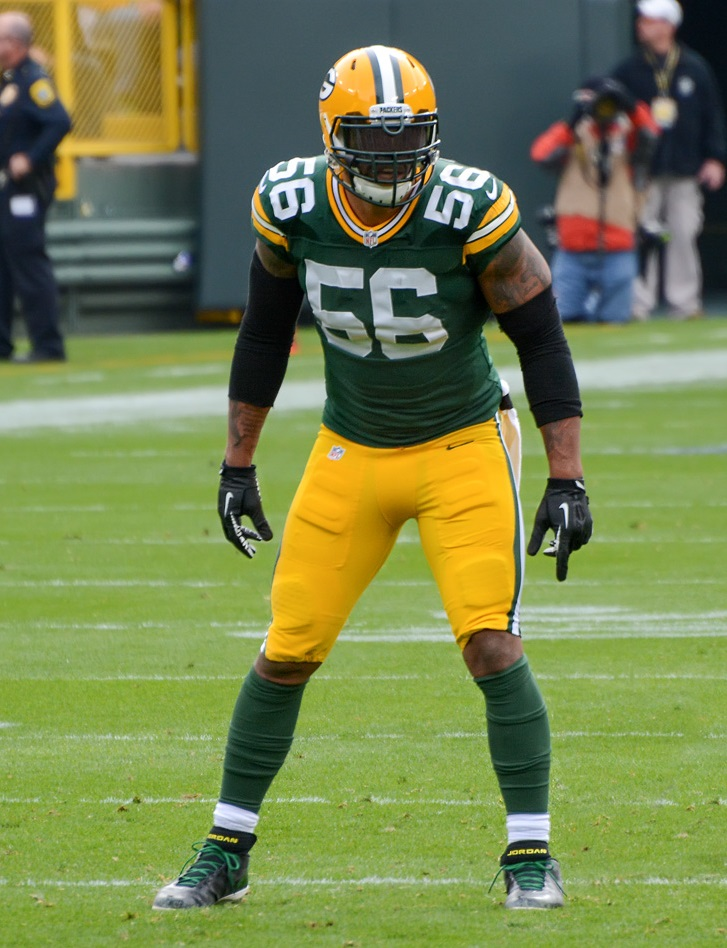
Hall of Fame defensive end Julius Peppers was drafted 2nd overall by the Carolina Panthers.

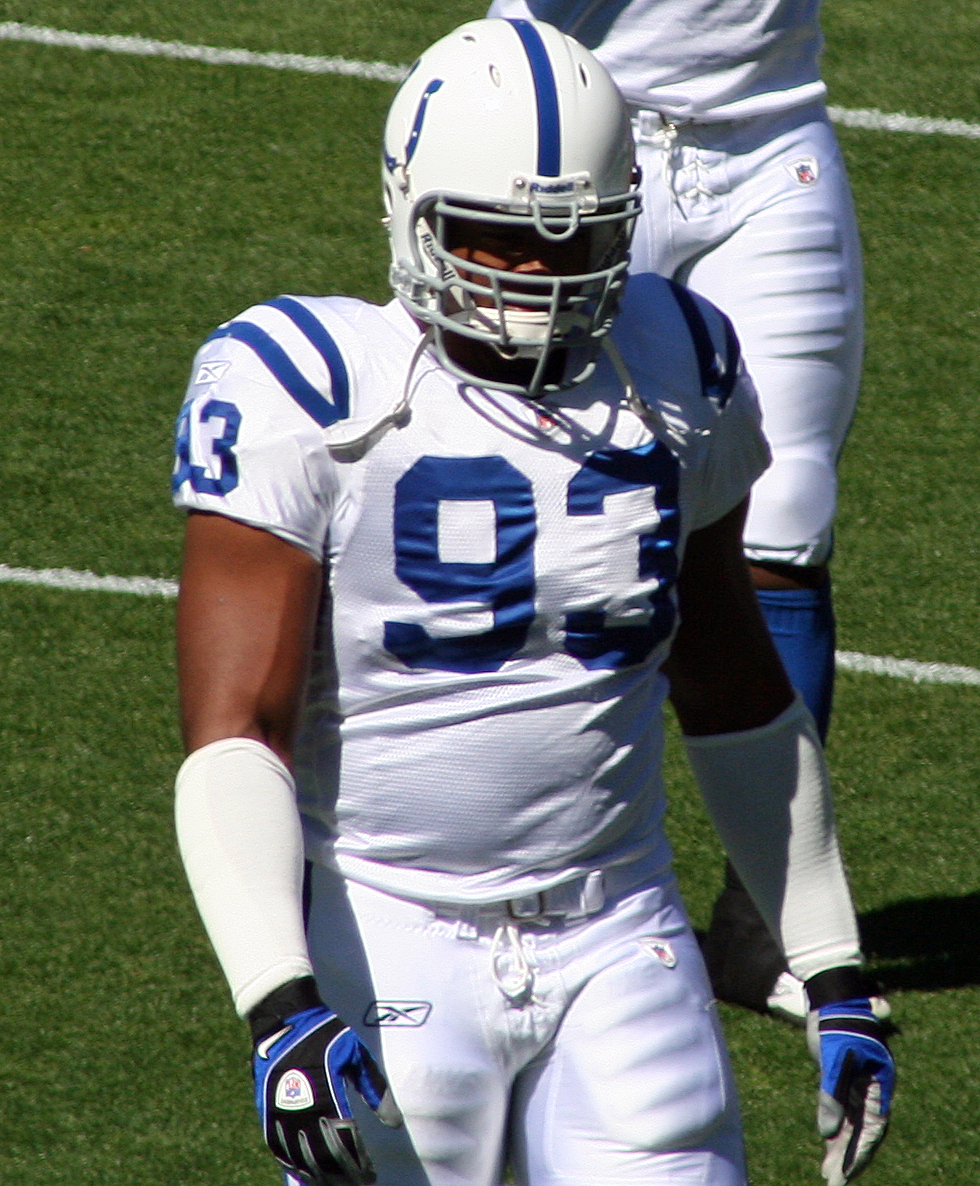
Hall of Fame defensive end Dwight Freeney was drafted 11th overall by the Indianapolis Colts.

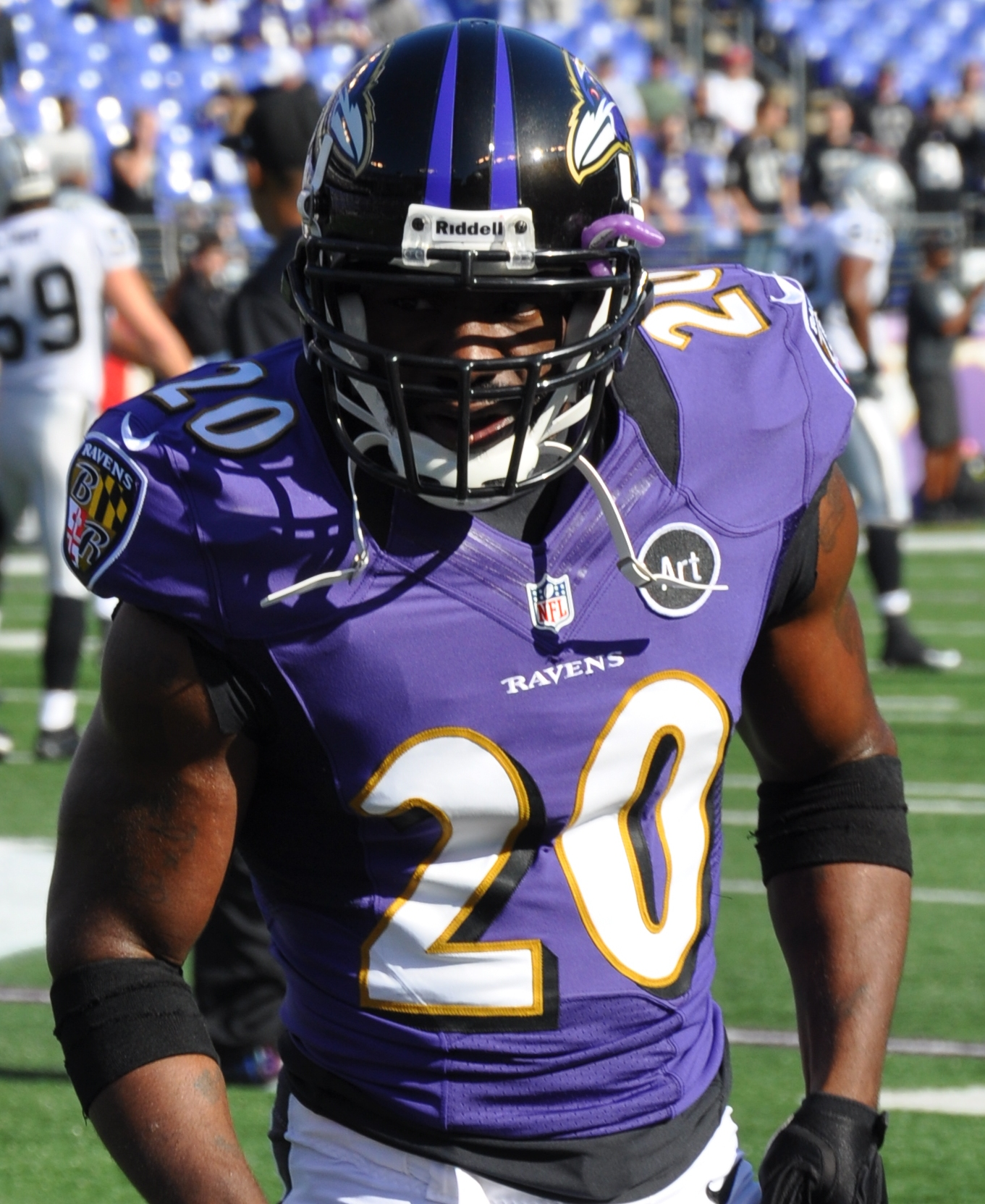
2004 NFL Defensive Player of the Year and Super Bowl XLVII Champion, Ed Reed was drafted 24th overall by the Baltimore Ravens.

Rnd.	Pick	Team	Player	Pos.	College	Notes
1	1	Houston Texans	David Carr	QB	Fresno State	
1	2	Carolina Panthers	Julius Peppers^{‡}^{†}	DE	North Carolina	
1	3	Detroit Lions	Joey Harrington	QB	Oregon	
1	4	Buffalo Bills	Mike Williams	T	Texas	
1	5	San Diego Chargers	Quentin Jammer	CB	Texas	
1	6	Kansas City Chiefs	Ryan Sims	DT	North Carolina	from Dallas (Note: No. 6: Dallas → Kansas City (D). Dallas traded a first-round selection (6th overall) to Kansas City in exchange for first- and third-round selections (8th and 75th overall), and a 2003 sixth-round selection. (Note: Tucker, Doug (April 20, 2002). "Chiefs Trade Up for UNC Defensive Tackle Ryan Sims". UNC (website) from AP.))
1	7	Minnesota Vikings	Bryant McKinnie ^{†}	T	Miami (FL)	
1	8	Dallas Cowboys	Roy Williams ^{†}	S	Oklahoma	from Kansas City (Note: No. 8: Kansas City → Dallas (D). See Round 1: Dallas → Kansas City)
1	9	Jacksonville Jaguars	John Henderson ^{†}	DT	Tennessee	
1	10	Cincinnati Bengals	Levi Jones	T	Arizona State	
1	11	Indianapolis Colts	Dwight Freeney^{‡}^{†}	DE	Syracuse	
1	12	Arizona Cardinals	Wendell Bryant	DT	Wisconsin	
1	13	New Orleans Saints	Donté Stallworth	WR	Tennessee	
1	14	New York Giants	Jeremy Shockey ^{†}	TE	Miami (FL)	from Tennessee (Note: No. 14: Tennessee → NY Giants (D). Tennessee traded a first-round selection (14th overall) to the NY Giants in exchange for first- and fourth-round selections (15th and 110th overall).)
1	15	Tennessee Titans	Albert Haynesworth ^{†}	DT	Tennessee	from NY Giants (Note: No. 15: NY Giants → Tennessee (D). See Round 1: Tennessee → NY Giants)
1	16	Cleveland Browns	William Green	RB	Boston College	
1	17	Oakland Raiders	Phillip Buchanon	CB	Miami (FL)	from Atlanta (Note: No. 17: Atlanta → Oakland (D). Atlanta traded a first-round selection (17th overall) to Oakland in exchange for first- and fifth-round selections (18th and 158th overall).)
1	18	Atlanta Falcons	T. J. Duckett	RB	Michigan State	from Washington via Oakland (Note: No. 18: Washington → Oakland → Atlanta. Multiple trades: Washington → Oakland (D). Washington traded a first-round selection (18th overall) to Oakland in exchange for first- and third-round selections (21st and 89th overall). Oakland → Atlanta (D). See Round 1: Atlanta → Oakland)
1	19	Denver Broncos	Ashley Lelie	WR	Hawaii	
1	20	Green Bay Packers	Javon Walker ^{†}	WR	Florida State	from Seattle (Note: No. 20: Seattle → Green Bay (D). Seattle traded first- and fifth- round selections (20th and 156th) to Green Bay in exchange for first- and second-round selections (28th and 60th).)
1	21	New England Patriots	Daniel Graham	TE	Colorado	from Tampa Bay via Oakland and Washington (Note: No. 21: Tampa Bay → Oakland → Washington → New England. Multiple trades: Tampa Bay → Oakland (PD). Tampa Bay traded first- and second-round selections (21st and 53rd), a 2003 first-round selection and a 2004 second-round selection to Oakland as compensation for signing Raiders' head coach Jon Gruden. Oakland → Washington (D). See Round 1: Washington → Oakland Washington → New England (D). Washington traded a first-round selection (21st overall) to New England in exchange for first-, third- and seventh-round selections (32nd, 96th and 234th).)
1	22	New York Jets	Bryan Thomas	DE	UAB	
1	23	Oakland Raiders	Napoleon Harris	LB	Northwestern	
1	24	Baltimore Ravens	Ed Reed^{‡}^{†}	S	Miami (FL)	
1	25	New Orleans Saints	Charles Grant	DE	Georgia	from Miami (Note: No. 25: Miami → New Orleans (PD). Miami traded first- and fourth-round selections (25th and 125th), and a 2003 first-round selection to New Orleans in exchange for a fourth-round selection (114th overall) and RB Ricky Williams.)
1	26	Philadelphia Eagles	Lito Sheppard ^{†}	CB	Florida	
1	27	San Francisco 49ers	Mike Rumph	CB	Miami (FL)	
1	28	Seattle Seahawks	Jerramy Stevens	TE	Washington	from Green Bay (Note: No. 28: Green Bay → Seattle (D). See Round 1: Seattle → Green Bay.)
1	29	Chicago Bears	Marc Colombo	T	Boston College	
1	30	Pittsburgh Steelers	Kendall Simmons	G	Auburn	
1	31	St. Louis Rams	Robert Thomas	LB	UCLA	
1	32	Washington Redskins	Patrick Ramsey	QB	Tulane	from New England (Note: No. 32: New England → Washington (D). See Round 1: Washington → New England.)
2	33	Houston Texans	Jabar Gaffney	WR	Florida	
2	34	Carolina Panthers	DeShaun Foster	RB	UCLA	
2	35	Detroit Lions	Kalimba Edwards	DE	South Carolina	
2	36	Buffalo Bills	Josh Reed	WR	LSU	
2	37	Dallas Cowboys	Andre Gurode ^{†}	C	Colorado	
2	38	Minnesota Vikings	Raonall Smith	LB	Washington State	
2	39	San Diego Chargers	Toniu Fonoti	G	Nebraska	
2	40	Jacksonville Jaguars	Mike Pearson	T	Florida	
2	41	Cincinnati Bengals	Lamont Thompson	S	Washington State	
2	42	Indianapolis Colts	Larry Tripplett	DT	Washington	
2	43	Kansas City Chiefs	Eddie Freeman	DE	UAB	
2	44	New Orleans Saints	LeCharles Bentley ^{†}	C	Ohio State	
2	45	Tennessee Titans	Tank Williams	S	Stanford	
2	46	New York Giants	Tim Carter	WR	Auburn	
2	47	Cleveland Browns	André Davis	WR	Virginia Tech	
2	48	San Diego Chargers	Reche Caldwell	WR	Florida	from Atlanta (Note: No. 48: Atlanta → San Diego (PD). Atlanta traded a second-round selection (48th overall), and 2001 first- and third-round selections to San Diego in exchange for a 2001 first-round selection.)
2	49	Arizona Cardinals	Levar Fisher	LB	NC State	
2¤	50	Houston Texans	Chester Pitts	G	San Diego State	
2	51	Denver Broncos	Clinton Portis ^{†}	RB	Miami (FL)	
2	52	Baltimore Ravens	Anthony Weaver	DE	Notre Dame	from Washington (Note: No. 52: Washington → Baltimore (D). Washington traded second- and third-round selections (52nd and 96th overall) to Baltimore in exchange for second-, third- and fifth-round selections (56th, 87th and 159th overall).)
2	53	Oakland Raiders	Langston Walker	T	California	from Tampa Bay (Note: No. 53: Tampa Bay → Oakland (PD). See Round 1: Tampa Bay → Oakland.)
2	54	Seattle Seahawks	Maurice Morris	RB	Oregon	
2	55	Oakland Raiders	Doug Jolley	TE	BYU	
2	56	Washington Redskins	Ladell Betts	RB	Iowa	from Baltimore (Note: No. 56: Baltimore → Washington (D). See Round 2: Washington → Baltimore.)
2	57	New York Jets	Jon McGraw	S	Kansas State	
2	58	Philadelphia Eagles	Michael Lewis ^{†}	S	Colorado	
2	59	Philadelphia Eagles	Sheldon Brown	CB	South Carolina	from Miami (Note: No. 59: Miami → Philadelphia (D). Miami traded a second-round selection (59th overall) to Philadelphia in exchange for 2001 third- and sixth round selections.)
2	60	Seattle Seahawks	Anton Palepoi	DE	UNLV	from Green Bay (Note: No. 60: Green Bay → Seattle (D). See Round 1: Seattle → Green Bay.)
2	61	Buffalo Bills	Ryan Denney	DE	BYU	from San Francisco (Note: No. 61: San Francisco → Buffalo (D). San Francisco traded a second-round selection (61st overall) to Buffalo in exchange for third- and fourth-round selections (69th and 102nd overall).)
2	62	Pittsburgh Steelers	Antwaan Randle El	WR	Indiana	
2	63	Dallas Cowboys	Antonio Bryant	WR	Pittsburgh	from Chicago (Note: No. 63: Chicago → Dallas (D). Chicago traded second- and fourth-round selections (63rd and 129th overall) to Dallas in exchange for third-, fourth- and fifth-round selections (72nd, 104th and 140th overall).)
2	64	St. Louis Rams	Travis Fisher	CB	UCF	
2	65	New England Patriots	Deion Branch	WR	Louisville	
3	66	Houston Texans	Fred Weary	G	Tennessee	
3	67	Cincinnati Bengals	Matt Schobel	TE	TCU	from Carolina (Note: No. 67: Carolina → Cincinnati (D). Carolina traded a third-round selection (67th overall) to Cincinnati in exchange for third- and fifth-round selections (73rd and 145th overall).)
3	68	Detroit Lions	André Goodman	CB	South Carolina	
3	69	San Francisco 49ers	Saleem Rasheed	LB	Alabama	from Buffalo (Note: No. 69: Buffalo → San Francisco (D). See Round 2: San Francisco → Buffalo.)
3	70	Minnesota Vikings	Willie Offord	S	South Carolina	
3	71	San Diego Chargers	Ben Leber	LB	Kansas State	
3	72	Chicago Bears	Roosevelt Williams	CB	Tuskegee	from Dallas (Note: No. 72: Dallas → Chicago (D). See Round 2: Chicago → Dallas.)
3	73	Carolina Panthers	Will Witherspoon	LB	Georgia	from Cincinnati (Note: No. 73: Cincinnati → Carolina (D). See Round 3: Carolina → Cincinnati.)
3	74	Indianapolis Colts	Joseph Jefferson	S	Western Kentucky	
3	75	Dallas Cowboys	Derek Ross	CB	Ohio State	from Kansas City (Note: No. 75: Kansas City → Dallas (D). See Round 1: Dallas → Kansas City)
3	76	Cleveland Browns	Melvin Fowler	C	Maryland	from Jacksonville (Note: No. 76: Jacksonville → Cleveland (D). Jacksonville traded a third-round selection (76th overall) to Cleveland in exchange for a third-round selection (79th overall) and LB Wali Rainer.)
3	77	Tennessee Titans	Rocky Calmus	LB	Oklahoma	
3	78	New York Giants	Jeff Hatch	T	Penn	
3	79	Washington Redskins	Rashad Bauman	CB	Oregon	from Cleveland via Jacksonville (Note: No. 79: Cleveland → Jacksonville → Washington. Multiple trades: Cleveland → Jacksonville (D). See Round 3: Jacksonville → Cleveland. Jacksonville → Washington (D). Jacksonville traded a third-round selection (79th overall) to Washington in exchange for third- and fourth-round selections (89th and 118th overall).)
3	80	Atlanta Falcons	Will Overstreet	LB	Tennessee	
3	81	Arizona Cardinals	Josh McCown	QB	Sam Houston State	
3	82	New Orleans Saints	James Allen	LB	Oregon State	
3¤	83	Houston Texans	Charles Hill	DT	Maryland	
3	84	St. Louis Rams	Lamar Gordon	RB	North Dakota State	from Washington via Kansas City (Note: No. 84: Washington → Kansas City → St. Louis. Multiple trades: Washington → Kansas City (PD). Washington sent a third-round selection (84th overall) and a 2001 third-round selection to Kansas City as compensation for hiring Marty Schottenheimer as head coach. Kansas City → St. Louis (D). Kansas City sent a third-round selection (84th overall) and a 2001 second-round selection to St. Louis as compensation for hiring Dick Vermeil as head coach.)
3	–	Denver Broncos	Forfeited due to a salary cap violation			
3	85	Seattle Seahawks	Kris Richard	CB	USC	
3	86	Tampa Bay Buccaneers	Marquise Walker	WR	Michigan	
3	87	Washington Redskins	Cliff Russell	WR	Utah	from Baltimore (Note: No. 87: Baltimore → Washington (D). See Round 2: Washington → Baltimore.)
3	88	New York Jets	Chris Baker	TE	Michigan State	
3	89	Jacksonville Jaguars	Akin Ayodele	LB	Purdue	from Oakland via Washington (Note: No. 89: Oakland → Washington → Jacksonville. Multiple trades: Oakland → Washington (D). See Round 1: Washington → Oakland Washington → Jacksonville (D). See Round 3: Jacksonville → Washington.)
3	90	Miami Dolphins	Seth McKinney	C	Texas A&M	
3	91	Philadelphia Eagles	Brian Westbrook ^{†}	RB	Villanova	
3	–	San Francisco 49ers	forfeited due to a salary cap violation			
3	92	Green Bay Packers	Marques Anderson	S	UCLA	
3	93	Chicago Bears	Terrence Metcalf	G	Ole Miss	
3	94	Pittsburgh Steelers	Chris Hope ^{†}	S	Florida State	
3	95	St. Louis Rams	Eric Crouch	WR	Nebraska	2001 Heisman Trophy winner
3	96	Denver Broncos	Dorsett Davis	DT	Mississippi State	from New England via Washington and Baltimore. (Note: No. 96: New England → Washington → Baltimore → Denver. Multiple trades: New England → Washington (D). See Round 1: New England → Washington. Washington → Baltimore (D). See Round 2: Washington → Baltimore. Baltimore → Denver (D). Baltimore traded a third-round selection (96th overall) to Denver in exchange for fourth- and fifth-round selections (112th and 155th overall).)
3*	97	Buffalo Bills	Coy Wire	S	Stanford	
3*	98	Arizona Cardinals	Dennis Johnson	DE	Kentucky	
4	99	Houston Texans	Jonathan Wells	RB	Ohio State	
4	100	Carolina Panthers	Dante Wesley	CB	Arkansas–Pine Bluff	
4	101	Cleveland Browns	Kevin Bentley	LB	Northwestern	from Detroit (Note: No. 101: Detroit → Denver (PD). Detroit traded a fourth-round selection (101st overall) to Cleveland in exchange for QB Ty Detmer.)
4	102	San Francisco 49ers	Jeff Chandler	K	Florida	from Buffalo (Note: No. 102: Buffalo → San Francisco (D). See Round 2: San Francisco → Buffalo.)
4	103	San Diego Chargers	Justin Peelle	TE	Oregon	
4	104	Chicago Bears	Alex Brown	DE	Florida	from Dallas (Note: No. 104: Dallas → Chicago (D). See Round 2: Chicago → Dallas.)
4	105	Minnesota Vikings	Brian Williams	CB	NC State	
4	106	Indianapolis Colts	David Thornton	LB	North Carolina	
4	107	Kansas City Chiefs	Omar Easy	FB	Penn State	
4	108	Jacksonville Jaguars	David Garrard ^{†}	QB	East Carolina	
4	109	Cincinnati Bengals	Travis Dorsch	K	Purdue	
4	110	Tennessee Titans	Mike Echols	CB	Wisconsin	from NY Giants (Note: No. 110: NY Giants → Tennessee (D). See Round 1: Tennessee → NY Giants)
4	111	Cleveland Browns	Ben Taylor	LB	Virginia Tech	
4	112	Baltimore Ravens	Dave Zastudil	P	Ohio	from Atlanta via Denver (Note: No. 112: Atlanta → Denver → Baltimore. Multiple trades: Atlanta → Denver (PD). Atlanta traded a fourth-round selection (112th overall) to Denver in exchange for three 2001 seventh-round selections. Denver → Baltimore (D). See Round 3: Baltimore → Denver.)
4	113	Arizona Cardinals	Nate Dwyer	DT	Kansas	
4	114	Miami Dolphins	Randy McMichael	TE	Georgia	from New Orleans (Note: No. 114: New Orleans → Miami (PD). See Round 1: Miami → New Orleans.)
4	115	Tennessee Titans	Tony Beckham	CB	UW–Stout	
4¤	116	Atlanta Falcons	Martin Bibla	G	Miami (FL)	from Houston (Note: No. 116: Houston → Atlanta (D). Houston traded a fourth-round selection (116th overall) to Atlanta in exchange for a 2003 third-round selection.)
4	117	New England Patriots	Rohan Davey	QB	LSU	from Denver (Note: No. 117: Denver → New England (D). Denver traded a fourth-round selection (117th overall) to New England in exchange for fourth- and fifth-round selections (131st and 144th).)
4	118	Jacksonville Jaguars	Chris Luzar	TE	Virginia	from Washington (Note: No. 118: Washington → Jacksonville (D). See Round 3: Jacksonville → Washington.)
4	119	Tampa Bay Buccaneers	Travis Stephens	RB	Tennessee	
4	120	Seattle Seahawks	Terreal Bierria	S	Georgia	
4	121	New York Jets	Alan Harper	DT	Fresno State	
4	122	Cleveland Browns	Darnell Sanders	TE	Ohio State	from Oakland (Note: No. 122: Oakland → Cleveland (D). Oakland traded a fourth-round selection (122nd overall) to Cleveland in exchange for fourth- and fifth-round selections (147th and 189th overall).)
4	123	Baltimore Ravens	Ron Johnson	WR	Minnesota	
4	124	Philadelphia Eagles	Scott Peters	C	Arizona State	
4	125	New Orleans Saints	Keyuo Craver	CB	Nebraska	from Miami (Note: No. 125: Miami → New Orleans (PD). See Round 1: Miami → New Orleans.)
4	126	New England Patriots	Jarvis Green	DE	LSU	from Green Bay (Note: No. 126: Green Bay → New England (D). Green Bay traded a fourth-round selection (126th overall) to New England in exchange for WR Terry Glenn.)
4	127	San Francisco 49ers	Kevin Curtis	S	Texas Tech	
4	128	Pittsburgh Steelers	Larry Foote	LB	Michigan	
4	129	Dallas Cowboys	Jamar Martin	FB	Ohio State	from Chicago (Note: No. 129: Chicago → Dallas (D). See Round 2: Chicago → Dallas.)
4	130	St. Louis Rams	Travis Scott	G	Arizona State	
4	131	Denver Broncos	Sam Brandon	S	UNLV	from New England (Note: No. 131: New England → Denver (D). See Round 4: Denver → New England.)
4*	132	Minnesota Vikings	Ed Ta'amu	G	Utah	
4*	133	Tennessee Titans	Rocky Boiman	LB	Notre Dame	
4*	134	Detroit Lions	John Taylor	DE	Montana State	
4*	135	Green Bay Packers	Najeh Davenport	RB	Miami (FL)	
5	136	Houston Texans	Jarrod Baxter	FB	New Mexico	
5	137	Carolina Panthers	Randy Fasani	QB	Stanford	
5	138	Detroit Lions	John Owens	TE	Notre Dame	
5	139	Buffalo Bills	Justin Bannan	DT	Colorado	
5	140	Chicago Bears	Bobby Gray	S	Louisiana Tech	from Dallas (Note: No. 140: Dallas → Chicago (D). See Round 2: Chicago → Dallas.)
5	141	Cleveland Browns	Andra Davis	LB	Florida	from Minnesota. (Note: No. 141: Minnesota → Cleveland (PD). Minnesota traded a fifth-round selection (141st overall), a 2003 fifth-round selection and G Everett Lindsay to Cleveland in exchange for QB Spergon Wynn and RB Travis Prentice.)
5	142	San Diego Chargers	Terry Charles	WR	Portland State	
5	143	Kansas City Chiefs	Scott Fujita	LB	California	
5	144	Denver Broncos	Herb Haygood	WR	Michigan State	from Jacksonville via New England (Note: No. 144: Jacksonville → New England → Denver. Multiple trades: Jacksonville → New England (PD). Jacksonville traded a fifth-round selection (144th overall) to New England in exchange for a 2001 sixth-round selection. New England → Denver (D). See Round 4: Denver → New England.)
5	145	Carolina Panthers	Kyle Johnson	FB	Syracuse	from Cincinnati (Note: No. 145: Cincinnati → Carolina (D). See Round 3: Carolina → Cincinnati.)
5	146	Seattle Seahawks	Rocky Bernard	DT	Texas A&M	from Indianapolis. (Note: No. 146: Indianapolis → Seattle (PD). Indianapolis traded a fifth-round selection (146th overall) to Seattle in exchange for QB Brock Huard.)
5	147	Oakland Raiders	Kenyon Coleman	DE	UCLA	from Cleveland (Note: No. 147: Cleveland → Oakland (D). See Round 4: Oakland → Cleveland.)
5	148	Atlanta Falcons	Kevin McCadam	S	Virginia Tech	
5	149	Arizona Cardinals	Jason McAddley	WR	Alabama	
5	150	New Orleans Saints	Mel Mitchell	S	Western Kentucky	
5	151	Tennessee Titans	Jake Schifino	WR	Akron	
5	152	New York Giants	Nick Greisen	LB	Wisconsin	
5¤	153	Houston Texans	Ramon Walker	S	Pittsburgh	
5	154	New York Jets	Jonathan Goodwin ^{†}	G	Michigan	from Washington. (Note: No. 154: Washington → NY Jets (PD). Washington traded a fifth-round selection (154th overall) to the NY Jets in exchange for a fifth-round selection (160th overall) and G David Loverne.)
5	155	Baltimore Ravens	Terry Jones	TE	Alabama	from Denver (Note: No. 155: Denver → Baltimore (D). See Round 3: Baltimore → Denver.)
5	156	Green Bay Packers	Aaron Kampman ^{†}	DE	Iowa	from Seattle (Note: No. 156: Green Bay → Seattle (D). See Round 1: Seattle → Green Bay.)
5	157	Tampa Bay Buccaneers	Jermaine Phillips	S	Georgia	
5	158	Atlanta Falcons	Kurt Kittner	QB	Illinois	from Oakland (Note: No. 158: Oakland → Atlanta (D). See Round 1: Atlanta → Oakland)
5	159	Washington Redskins	Andre Lott	S	Tennessee	from Baltimore (Note: No. 159: Baltimore → Washington (D). See Round 2: Washington → Baltimore.)
5	160	Washington Redskins	Robert Royal	TE	LSU	NY Jets (Note: No. 160: NY Jets → Washington (D). See Round 5: Washington → NY Jets.)
5	161	Miami Dolphins	Omare Lowe	S	Washington	
5	162	Philadelphia Eagles	Freddie Milons	WR	Alabama	
5	163	San Francisco 49ers	Brandon Doman	QB	BYU	
5	164	Green Bay Packers	Craig Nall	QB	Northwestern State	
5	165	Chicago Bears	Bryan Knight	LB	Pittsburgh	
5	166	Pittsburgh Steelers	Verron Haynes	RB	Georgia	
5	167	St. Louis Rams	Courtland Bullard	LB	Ohio State	
5	168	Dallas Cowboys	Pete Hunter	CB	Virginia Union	from New England. (Note: No. 168: New England → Dallas (D). New England traded a fifth-round selection (168th overall) to Dallas in exchange for a seventh-round selection (237th overall) and 2003 fifth-round selection.)
5*	169	Seattle Seahawks	Ryan Hannam	TE	Northern Iowa	
5*	170	Miami Dolphins	Sam Simmons	WR	Northwestern	
5*	171	Seattle Seahawks	Matt Hill	T	Boise State	
5*	172	San Francisco 49ers	Josh Shaw	DT	Michigan State	
6	173	Houston Texans	DeMarcus Faggins	CB	Kansas State	
6	174	Carolina Panthers	Keith Heinrich	TE	Sam Houston State	
6	175	Detroit Lions	Chris Cash	CB	USC	
6	176	Buffalo Bills	Kevin Thomas	CB	UNLV	
6	177	Minnesota Vikings	Nick Rogers	LB	Georgia Tech	
6	178	San Diego Chargers	Matt Anderle	T	Minnesota	
6	179	Dallas Cowboys	Tyson Walter	C	Ohio State	
6	180	Jacksonville Jaguars	Clenton Ballard	DT	Southwest Texas State	
6	181	Cincinnati Bengals	Marquand Manuel	S	Florida	
6	182	Indianapolis Colts	David Pugh	DT	Virginia Tech	
6	183	Indianapolis Colts	James Lewis	S	Miami (FL)	from Kansas City via St. Louis (Note: No. 183: Kansas City → St. Louis → Indianapolis. Multiple trades: Kansas City → St. Louis (PD). Kansas City traded a sixth-round selection (183rd overall) to St. Louis in exchange for RB James Lewis. St. Louis → Indianapolis (PD). St. Louis traded a sixth-round selection (183rd overall) to Indianapolis in exchange for WR Terrence Wilkins.)
6	184	Atlanta Falcons	Kahlil Hill	WR	Iowa	
6	185	Arizona Cardinals	Josh Scobey	RB	Kansas State	
6	186	New Orleans Saints	J. T. O'Sullivan	QB	UC Davis	
6	187	Tennessee Titans	Justin Hartwig	C	Kansas	
6	188	New York Giants	Wesly Mallard	LB	Oregon	
6	189	Oakland Raiders	Keyon Nash	S	Albany State	from Cleveland (Note: No. 189: Cleveland → Oakland (D). See Round 4: Oakland → Cleveland.)
6¤	190	Houston Texans	Howard Green	DT	LSU	
6	191	Denver Broncos	Jeb Putzier	TE	Boise State	
6	192	Washington Redskins	Reggie Coleman	T	Tennessee	
6	193	Tampa Bay Buccaneers	John Stamper	DE	South Carolina	
6	194	Seattle Seahawks	Craig Jarrett	P	Michigan State	
6	195	Baltimore Ravens	Lamont Brightful	CB	Eastern Washington	
6	196	New Orleans Saints	John Gilmore	TE	Penn State	from NY Jets. (Note: No. 196: NY Jets → New Orleans (PD). NY Jets traded a sixth-round selection (196th overall) and CB Earthwind Moreland to New Orleans in exchange for RB Chad Morton.)
6	197	Oakland Raiders	Larry Ned	RB	San Diego State	
6	198	Philadelphia Eagles	Tyreo Harrison	LB	Notre Dame	
6	199	Chicago Bears	Adrian Peterson	RB	Georgia Southern	from Miami. (Note: No. 199: Miami → Chicago (PD). Miami traded a sixth-round selection (199th overall) and a 2003 sixth-round selection to Chicago in exchange for a seventh-round selection (241st overall) and QB Cade McNown.)
6	200	Green Bay Packers	Mike Houghton	T	San Diego State	
6	201	San Francisco 49ers	Mark Anelli	TE	Wisconsin	
6	202	Pittsburgh Steelers	Lee Mays	WR	UTEP	
6	203	Chicago Bears	Jamin Elliott	WR	Delaware	
6	204	Indianapolis Colts	Brian Allen	RB	Stanford	from St. Louis. (Note: No. 204: St. Louis → Indianapolis (PD). St. Louis traded a sixth-round selection (204th overall) to Indianapolis in exchange for P John Baker.)
6	205	St. Louis Rams	Steve Bellisari	QB	Ohio State	from New England. (Note: No. 205: New England → St. Louis (PD). New England traded a sixth-round selection (205th overall) to St. Louis in exchange for WR Dane Looker.)
6*	206	Baltimore Ravens	Javin Hunter	WR	Notre Dame	
6*	207	Baltimore Ravens	Chester Taylor	RB	Toledo	
6*	208	Dallas Cowboys	DeVeren Johnson	WR	Sacred Heart	
6*	209	Baltimore Ravens	Chad Williams	S	Southern Miss	
6*	210	Chicago Bears	Bryan Fletcher	TE	UCLA	
6*	211	Dallas Cowboys	Bob Slowikowski	TE	Virginia Tech	
7	212	Pittsburgh Steelers	Lavar Glover	CB	Cincinnati	from Houston (Note: No. 212: Houston → Pittsburgh (PD). Houston sent a seventh-round selection (212th overall) to Pittsburgh as compensation for signing restricted free agent K Kris Brown.)
7	213	Carolina Panthers	Pete Campion	G	North Dakota State	
7	214	Detroit Lions	Luke Staley	RB	BYU	
7	215	Buffalo Bills	Mike Pucillo	C	Auburn	
7	216	San Diego Chargers	Seth Burford	QB	Cal Poly	
7	217	Atlanta Falcons	Michael Coleman	WR	Widener	from Dallas (Note: No. 217: Dallas → Atlanta (PD). Dallas traded a seventh-round selection (217th overall) to Atlanta in exchange for TE O. J. Santiago.)
7	218	Minnesota Vikings	Chad Beasley	T	Virginia Tech	
7	219	Cincinnati Bengals	Joey Evans	DE	North Carolina	
7	220	Indianapolis Colts	Josh Mallard	DE	Georgia	
7	221	Kansas City Chiefs	Maurice Rodriguez	LB	Fresno State	
7	222	Jacksonville Jaguars	Kendall Newson	WR	Middle Tennessee	
7	223	Arizona Cardinals	Mike Banks	TE	Iowa State	
7	224	New Orleans Saints	Derrius Monroe	DE	Virginia Tech	
7	225	Tennessee Titans	Darrell Hill	WR	Northern Illinois	
7	226	New York Giants	Daryl Jones	WR	Miami (FL)	
7	227	Cleveland Browns	Joaquin Gonzalez	T	Miami (FL)	
7	228	Denver Broncos	Chris Young	S	Georgia Tech	from Atlanta (Note: No. 228: Atlanta → Denver (PD). Atlanta traded a seventh-round selection (228th overall) to Denver in exchange for LB Henri Crockett.)
7¤	229	Houston Texans	Greg "Stylez G." White	DE	Minnesota	
7	230	Washington Redskins	Jeff Grau	C	UCLA	
7	231	Denver Broncos	Monsanto Pope	DT	Virginia	
7	232	Seattle Seahawks	Jeff Kelly	QB	Southern Miss	
7	233	Tampa Bay Buccaneers	Tim Wansley	CB	Georgia	
7	234	Washington Redskins	Greg Scott	DE	Hampton	from NY Jets via New England (Note: No. 234: NY Jets → New England → Washington. Multiple trades: NY Jets → New England (PD). The NY Jets traded a seventh-round selection (234th overall) and a 2001 fifth-round selection to New England in exchange for a 2000 first-round selection, and 2001 fourth- and seventh-round selections as a result of New England hiring Bill Belichick as head coach. New England → Washington (PD). See Round 1: New England → Washington.)
7	235	Oakland Raiders	Ronald Curry	QB	North Carolina	
7	236	Baltimore Ravens	Wes Pate	QB	Stephen F. Austin	
7	237	New England Patriots	Antwoine Womack	RB	Virginia	from Miami via Dallas (Note: No. 237: Miami → Dallas → New England. Multiple trades: Miami → Dallas (PD). Miami traded a seventh-round selection (237th overall) to Dallas in exchange for WR Jeff Ogden. Dallas → New England (PD). See Round 5: New England → Dallas.)
7	238	Philadelphia Eagles	Raheem Brock	DE	Temple	
7	239	San Francisco 49ers	Eric Heitmann	C	Stanford	
7	240	Tennessee Titans	Carlos Hall	DE	Arkansas	from Green Bay (Note: No. 240: Green Bay → Tennessee (PD). Green Bay traded a seventh-round selection (240th overall) to Tennessee in exchange for DE Carlos Hall.)
7	241	Miami Dolphins	Leonard Henry	RB	East Carolina	from Chicago (Note: No. 241: Chicago → Miami (PD). See Round 6: Miami → Chicago.)
7	242	Pittsburgh Steelers	Brett Keisel ^{†}	DE	BYU	
7	243	St. Louis Rams	Chris Massey	FB	Marshall	
7	244	Atlanta Falcons	Kevin Shaffer	T	Tulsa	
7*	245	New York Giants	Quincy Monk	LB	North Carolina	
7*	246	Jacksonville Jaguars	Steve Smith	CB	Oregon	
7*	247	Jacksonville Jaguars	Hayden Epstein	K	Michigan	
7*	248	San Francisco 49ers	Kyle Kosier	T	Arizona State	
7*	249	Buffalo Bills	Rodney Wright	WR	Fresno State	
7*	250	Tampa Bay Buccaneers	Tracey Wistrom	TE	Nebraska	
7*	251	Buffalo Bills	Jarrett Ferguson	RB	Virginia Tech	
7*	252	Detroit Lions	Matt Murphy	TE	Maryland	
7*	253	New England Patriots	David Givens	WR	Notre Dame	
7*	254	Tampa Bay Buccaneers	Aaron Lockett	WR	Kansas State	
7*	255	Tampa Bay Buccaneers	Zack Quaccia	C	Stanford	
7*	256	San Francisco 49ers	Teddy Gaines	CB	Tennessee	
7*	257	Washington Redskins	Rock Cartwright	RB	Kansas State	
7^	258	Carolina Panthers	Brad Franklin	CB	Louisiana–Lafayette	
7^	259	Detroit Lions	Victor Rogers	T	Colorado	
7^	260	Buffalo Bills	Dominique Stevenson	LB	Tennessee	
7¤	261	Houston Texans	Ahmad Miller	DT	UNLV	

== Trades ==
In the explanations below, (D) denotes trades that took place during the draft, while (PD) indicates trades completed pre-draft.

Round 1

Round 2

Round 3

Round 4

Round 5

Round 6

Round 7

== Supplemental draft selections ==
For each player selected in the supplemental draft, the team forfeits its pick in that round in the draft of the following season.

Rnd.	Pick	Team	Player	Pos.	College	Notes
6	–	Houston Texans	Milford Brown	G	Florida State	

== Notable undrafted players ==
†	Pro Bowler

Original NFL team	Player	Pos.	College	Notes
Arizona Cardinals	Damien Anderson	RB	Northwestern	
Arizona Cardinals	Quentin Harris	CB	Syracuse	
Arizona Cardinals	Eric Joyce	CB	Tennessee State	
Arizona Cardinals	Jake Soliday	WR	Northern Iowa	
Arizona Cardinals	Tony Wragge	G	New Mexico State	
Baltimore Ravens	Shawn Byrdsong	CB	Mississippi State	
Baltimore Ravens	Will Demps	S	San Diego State	
Baltimore Ravens	Louis Green	LB	Alcorn State	
Baltimore Ravens	Randy Hymes	WR	Grambling State	
Baltimore Ravens	Ma'ake Kemoeatu	DT	Utah	
Baltimore Ravens	Bart Scott ^{†}	LB	Southern Illinois	
Buffalo Bills	Ahmad D. Brooks	CB	Texas	
Buffalo Bills	Daryon Brutley	CB	Northern Iowa	
Buffalo Bills	Clarence Coleman	WR	Ferris State	
Buffalo Bills	Grant Irons	DE	Notre Dame	
Carolina Panthers	Kemp Rasmussen	DE	Indiana	
Chicago Bears	Travis Coleman	CB	Hampton	
Chicago Bears	Rashied Davis	WR	San Jose State	
Chicago Bears	Maurice Hicks	RB	North Carolina A&T	
Chicago Bears	Eric McCoo	RB	Penn State	
Chicago Bears	Edell Shepherd	WR	San Jose State	
Cincinnati Bengals	Ray Jackson	RB	Cincinnati	
Cleveland Browns	Frisman Jackson	WR	Western Illinois	
Cleveland Browns	Qasim Mitchell	G	North Carolina A&T	
Cleveland Browns	Chad Mustard	TE	North Dakota	
Cleveland Browns	Kalvin Pearson	S	Grambling State	
Dallas Cowboys	Khary Campbell	LB	Bowling Green	
Dallas Cowboys	Billy Cundiff ^{†}	K	Drake	
Dallas Cowboys	Woodrow Dantzler	RB	Clemson	
Dallas Cowboys	Keith Davis	S	Sam Houston State	
Dallas Cowboys	Filip Filipović	P	South Dakota	
Dallas Cowboys	Chad Hutchinson	QB	Stanford	
Denver Broncos	Charlie Adams	WR	Hofstra	
Denver Broncos	Jashon Sykes	LB	Colorado	
Denver Broncos	Lenny Walls	CB	Boston College	
Detroit Lions	Eddie Drummond ^{†}	WR	Penn State	
Detroit Lions	Antwan Lake	DE	West Virginia	
Detroit Lions	James Mungro	RB	Syracuse	
Detroit Lions	Josh Thornhill	LB	Michigan State	
Green Bay Packers	Kevin Barry	T	Arizona	
Green Bay Packers	Tony Fisher	RB	Notre Dame	
Green Bay Packers	Erwin Swiney	CB	Nebraska	
Green Bay Packers	Marcus Wilkins	LB	Texas	
Houston Texans	Atnaf Harris	WR	Cal State Northridge	
Houston Texans	Rashod Kent	TE	Rutgers	
Houston Texans	Jimmy McClain	LB	Troy State	
Houston Texans	Eric Parker	WR	Tennessee	
Houston Texans	Ed Stansbury	RB	UCLA	
Indianapolis Colts	John Stone	WR	Wake Forest	
Indianapolis Colts	Kurt Vollers	T	Notre Dame	
Indianapolis Colts	Ricky Williams	RB	Texas Tech	
Jacksonville Jaguars	Bruce Branch	CB	Penn State	
Jacksonville Jaguars	Quinn Gray	QB	Florida A&M	
Kansas City Chiefs	Dwayne Blakley	TE	Missouri	
Kansas City Chiefs	Jarmar Julien	RB	San Jose State	
Miami Dolphins	James Atkins	DT	Virginia Union	
Miami Dolphins	Greg Jerman	T	Baylor	
Miami Dolphins	Bobby Sippio	WR	Western Kentucky	
Minnesota Vikings	Jack Brewer	S	Minnesota	
Minnesota Vikings	Kelly Campbell	WR	Georgia Tech	
Minnesota Vikings	Nick Davis	WR	Wisconsin	
Minnesota Vikings	Shaun Hill	QB	Maryland	
New Orleans Saints	P. J. Alexander	C	Syracuse	
New Orleans Saints	Jeff Reed	K	North Carolina	
New York Giants	Darian Barnes	FB	Hampton	
New York Giants	Matt Bryant ^{†}	K	Baylor	
New York Giants	Ryan Clark ^{†}	S	LSU	
New York Giants	Matt Mitrione	DT	Purdue	
New York Giants	Charles Stackhouse	FB	Ole Miss	
New York Jets	Danny Boyd	K	LSU	
New York Jets	Andrew Davison	CB	Kansas	
New York Jets	Marcus Floyd	CB	Indiana	
New York Jets	Brandon Moore ^{†}	G	Illinois	
Philadelphia Eagles	Steve Edwards	G	UCF	
Philadelphia Eagles	Justin Ena	LB	BYU	
Philadelphia Eagles	Artis Hicks	G	Memphis	
Philadelphia Eagles	Corey McIntyre	FB	West Virginia	
Philadelphia Eagles	Jason McKie	FB	Temple	
Pittsburgh Steelers	James Harrison ^{†}	LB	Kent State	
San Diego Chargers	Jason Ball	C	New Hampshire	
San Diego Chargers	Jesse Chatman	RB	Eastern Washington	
San Diego Chargers	Vernon Fox	S	Fresno State	
San Diego Chargers	Josh Norman	TE	Oklahoma	
San Francisco 49ers	Nate Jackson	TE	Menlo	
San Francisco 49ers	Michael Jennings	WR	Florida State	
Seattle Seahawks	D. D. Lewis	LB	Texas	
St. Louis Rams	Andy King	G	Illinois State	
Tampa Bay Buccaneers	Ryan Nece	LB	UCLA	
Tampa Bay Buccaneers	Corey Smith	LB	NC State	
Tampa Bay Buccaneers	Justin Smith	LB	Indiana	
Tennessee Titans	Kevin Aldridge	DE	SMU	
Tennessee Titans	Brad Kassell	LB	North Texas	
Tennessee Titans	John Simon	RB	Louisiana Tech	
Washington Redskins	Bernard Jackson	DE	Tennessee	
Washington Redskins	Ricot Joseph	S	UCF	

== Hall of Famers ==
- Ed Reed, free safety from Miami (FL), taken 1st round 24th overall by the Baltimore Ravens.

Inducted: Professional Football Hall of Fame Class of 2019.

- Julius Peppers, defensive end from North Carolina, taken 1st round 2nd overall by the Carolina Panthers.

Inducted: Professional Football Hall of Fame Class of 2024.

- Dwight Freeney, defensive end from Syracuse, taken 1st round 11th overall by the Indianapolis Colts.

Inducted: Professional Football Hall of Fame Class of 2024.
