= 2002 Carolina Panthers season =

NFL team season

- Owner: Jerry Richardson
- General manager: Marty Hurney
- Head coach: John Fox
- Home stadium: Ericsson Stadium

Results
- Record: 7–9
- Division place: 4th NFC South
- Playoffs: Did not qualify
- All-Pros: DT Kris Jenkins (1st team); P Todd Sauerbrun (1st team)
- Pro Bowlers: DT Kris Jenkins; P Todd Sauerbrun

The 2002 season was the Carolina Panthers' eighth in the National Football League and their first under head coach John Fox. They tried to improve upon their 1–15 record in 2001, and make it to the playoffs for the second time in franchise history.

After moving from the NFC West to the more geographically accurate NFC South, they improved by six games to finish 7–9, but were still five games behind the division champion Tampa Bay Buccaneers and failed to make the playoffs. Their Week 12, 41–0 loss against the Atlanta Falcons was the Panthers' last shutout for 21 years.

== Offseason ==
Signings	Departures
DE Shane Burton (Jets)	WR Donald Hayes (Patriots)
CB Terry Cousin (Dolphins)	FB Chris Hetherington (Rams)
LB Mark Fields (Rams)	DE Jay Williams (Dolphins)

=== NFL draft ===
The 2002 NFL draft took place at Radio City Music Hall in New York City on April 15 and April 16, 2002. The Panthers selected nine players in seven rounds. Despite having the worst record in the league the previous season, the Panthers picked 2nd overall due to the Houston Texans picking first overall in their inaugural draft, as is tradition (under NFL rules) with expansion teams.

2002 Carolina Panthers draft
Round	Pick	Player	Position	College	Notes
1	2	Julius Peppers * ^{†}	DE	North Carolina	
2	34	DeShaun Foster	RB	UCLA	
3	73	Will Witherspoon	LB	Georgia	
4	100	Dante Wesley	CB	Arkansas-Pine Bluff	
5	137	Randy Fasani	QB	Stanford	
5	145	Kyle Johnson	FB	Syracuse	
6	174	Keith Heinrich	TE	Sam Houston State	
7	213	Pete Campion	G	North Dakota State	
7	258	Brad Franklin	CB	Louisiana-Lafayette	
Made roster † Pro Football Hall of Fame * Made at least one Pro Bowl during career

=== Undrafted free agents ===
2002 undrafted free agents of note
Player	Position	College
Ken Amato	Linebacker	Montana State
Nathan Black	Wide receiver	Northwestern State
Eric Brackins	Linebacker	Michigan
Ben Coleman	Defensive tackle	Florida A&M
Lonnie Ford	Defensive end	USC
Guilian Gary	Wide receiver	Maryland
Billy Dee Greenwood	Safety	North Carolina
Terrell Harris	Wide receiver	Tulane
Mark Inkrott	Tight end	Findlay
Shannon Money	Guard	Arkansas
Aries Monroe	Linebacker	Alabama
Tavarreus Pounds	Linebacker	Auburn
Kemp Rasmussen	Defensive end	Indiana
Darian Tate	Defensive tackle	Walsh
Ryan Tolhurst	Wide receiver	Richmond

== Personnel ==
=== Staff ===
2002 Carolina Panthers staff
Front office: Owner/founder – Jerry Richardson; President – Mark Richardson; General manager – Marty Hurney; Director of player personnel – Jack Bushofsky; Head coaches: Head coach – John Fox; Offensive coaches: Offensive coordinator – Dan Henning; Running backs – Jim Skipper; Wide receivers – Richard Williamson; Tight ends – Don Breaux; Offensive line – Paul Boudreau; Offensive assistant/quarterbacks – Mike McCoy	Defensive coaches: Defensive coordinator – Jack Del Rio; Defensive line – Mike Trgovac; Linebackers – Sam Mills; Secondary – Rod Perry; Defensive assistant – Alvin Reynolds; Defensive assistant – Sal Sunseri; Special teams coaches: Assistant head coach/special teams – Scott O'Brien; Assistant special teams coordinator/assistant strength and conditioning – Darrin Simmons; Strength and conditioning: Strength and conditioning – Jerry Simmons

=== Roster ===
2002 Carolina Panthers roster
Quarterbacks (QB): 12 Randy Fasani; 9 Rodney Peete; 16 Chris Weinke; Running backs (RB): 22 Dee Brown KR; 37 Nick Goings; 42 Skip Hicks; 45 Brad Hoover FB; 33 Joe Montgomery; 32 Rod Smart; Wide receivers (WR): 83 Nathan Black; 82 Isaac Byrd; 88 Karl Hankton; 87 Muhsin Muhammad; 89 Steve Smith; Tight ends (TE): 49 Shawn Draper; 86 Kris Mangum; 85 Wesley Walls; 84 Jermaine Wiggins	Offensive linemen (OL): 65 Kevin Donnalley G; 74 Derrick Fletcher G/T; 78 Jeno James G; 60 Jeff Mitchell C; 63 Jamar Nesbit G; 76 Tutan Reyes G/T; 75 Todd Steussie T; 73 Melvin Tuten G/T; 66 Louis Williams C; Defensive linemen (DL): 99 Brentson Buckner DT; 98 Shane Burton DT; 92 Mario Fatafehi DT; 77 Kris Jenkins DT; 97 Kemp Rasmussen DE; 93 Mike Rucker DE; 91 Josh Taves DE; 96 Al Wallace DE	Linebackers (LB): 52 Brian Allen OLB; 58 Mark Fields OLB; 50 Brad Jackson OLB; 52 Kory Minor OLB; 53 Hannibal Navies OLB; 54 Will Witherspoon MLB; Defensive backs (DB): 35 Deke Cooper FS; 21 Terry Cousin CB; 36 Brad Franklin CB; 27 Deon Grant FS; 23 Reggie Howard CB; 25 Emmanuel McDaniel CB; 30 Mike Minter SS; 39 Damien Richardson SS; 29 Dante Wesley CB; Special teams (ST): 11 Shayne Graham K; 56 Jason Kyle LS; 10 Todd Sauerbrun P	Practice squad: 15 Rob Johnson WR; 41 Julian Jones S; 59 Terrance Simmons DE; 62 Tim Stuber G; 18 Bashir Yamini WR; Reserve: 46 Rashard Anderson CB (Susp.); 24 Michael Bates RB (IR); 40 Jarrod Cooper S (IR); 28 Terry Fair CB (IR); 20 DeShaun Foster RB (IR); 94 Sean Gilbert DT (IR); 80 Keith Heinrich TE (IR); 4 John Kasay K (IR); 55 Dan Morgan LB (IR); 90 Julius Peppers DE (Susp.); 71 Fernando Smith DE (IR); 26 Lamar Smith RB (IR); 3 Ryan Tolhurst WR (IR); 57 Lester Towns LB (IR); Rookies in italics 53 active, 14 reserve, 5 practice squad

== Regular season ==
=== Schedule ===
Under the NFL’s new scheduling formula put in place for this season, the Panthers would play two games each season against their NFC South division rivals. A schedule rotation would see them play the NFC North in full in 2002 and every three seasons subsequently, and the AFC North in 2002 and every four seasons subsequently. As the Panthers had the worst record in the NFL in 2001, they would also play the Arizona Cardinals, who had the worst 2001 record amongst teams in the reconstituted NFC West, and the Dallas Cowboys, who had the worst 2001 record amongst teams in the NFC East.

Week	Date	Opponent	Result	Record	Venue	Attendance
1	September 8	Baltimore Ravens	**W** 10–7	1–0	Ericsson Stadium	70,386
2	September 15	Detroit Lions	**W** 31–7	2–0	Ericsson Stadium	71,951
3	September 22	at Minnesota Vikings	**W** 21–14	3–0	Hubert H. Humphrey Metrodome	63,945
4	September 29	at Green Bay Packers	**L** 14–17	3–1	Lambeau Field	63,329
5	October 6	Arizona Cardinals	**L** 13–16	3–2	Ericsson Stadium	72,286
6	October 13	at Dallas Cowboys	**L** 13–14	3–3	Texas Stadium	61,773
7	October 20	at **Atlanta Falcons**	**L** 0–30	3–4	Georgia Dome	68,056
8	October 27	**Tampa Bay Buccaneers**	**L** 9–12	3–5	Ericsson Stadium	72,892
9	Bye					
10	November 10	**New Orleans Saints**	**L** 24–34	3–6	Ericsson Stadium	72,566
11	November 17	at **Tampa Bay Buccaneers**	**L** 10–23	3–7	Raymond James Stadium	65,527
12	November 24	**Atlanta Falcons**	**L** 0–41	3–8	Ericsson Stadium	72,533
13	December 1	at Cleveland Browns	**W** 13–6	4–8	Cleveland Browns Stadium	72,718
14	December 8	Cincinnati Bengals	**W** 52–31	5–8	Ericsson Stadium	66,799
15	December 15	at Pittsburgh Steelers	**L** 14–30	5–9	Heinz Field	58,586
16	December 22	Chicago Bears	**W** 24–14	6–9	Ericsson Stadium	72,602
17	December 29	at **New Orleans Saints**	**W** 10–6	7–9	Louisiana Superdome	66,946
Note: Intra-division opponents are in **bold** text.

=== Game summaries ===
==== Week 2: vs. Detroit Lions ====
Week 2: Detroit Lions at Carolina Panthers

Quarter	1	2	3	4	Total
Lions	0	0	7	0	**7**
**Panthers**	0	10	14	7	**31**

at Ericsson Stadium, Charlotte, North Carolina

- Date: September 15, 2002
- Game time: 1:00 p.m.
- Game weather: Cloudy, 72 °F (22 °C)
- Game attendance: 71,951
- Referee: Gerald Austin (34)
- TV announcers (FOX): Kenny Albert, Tim Green, and Paul Butler
- Recap, Game Book

Game information

**First quarter**

- No scoring plays.

**Second quarter**

- CAR – John Kasay 23-yard field goal, 3:27. Panthers 3–0. **Drive: 5 plays, 19 yards, 2:09.**
- CAR – Muhsin Muhammad 22-yard pass from Rodney Peete (John Kasay kick), 0:16. Panthers 10–0. **Drive: 5 plays, 69 yards, 0:46.**

**Third quarter**

- DET – Mike McMahon 11-yard run (Jason Hanson kick), 8:21. Panthers 10–7. **Drive: 5 plays, 76 yards, 3:10.**
- CAR – Lamar Smith 3-yard run (John Kasay kick), 6:44. Panthers 17–7. **Drive: 4 plays, 77 yards, 1:37.**
- CAR – Mike Minter 40-yard interception return (John Kasay kick), 5:49. Panthers 24–7.

**Fourth quarter**

- CAR – Lamar Smith 1-yard run (John Kasay kick), 9:43. Panthers 31–7. **Drive: 10 plays, 71 yards, 5:44.**

**Top passers**

- DET – Mike McMahon – 9/23, 95 yards, INT
- CAR – Rodney Peete – 21/32, 310 yards, TD

**Top rushers**

- DET – James Stewart – 12 rushes, 53 yards
- CAR – Lamar Smith – 20 rushes, 60 yards, 2 TD

**Top receivers**

- DET – Scotty Anderson – 2 receptions, 31 yards
- CAR – Muhsin Muhammad – 8 receptions, 107 yards, TD

==== Week 3: at Minnesota Vikings ====
Week 3: Carolina Panthers (2–0) at Minnesota Vikings (0–2) – Game summary

Quarter	1	2	3	4	Total
**Panthers**	0	0	7	14	**21**
Vikings	0	7	0	7	**14**

at Hubert H. Humphrey Metrodome, Minneapolis, Minnesota

- Date: September 22, 2002
- Game time: 12:00 p.m.
- Game weather: None (indoor stadium)
- Game attendance: 63,945
- Referee: Bernie Kukar (86)
- TV announcers (FOX): Curt Menefee (play-by-play), Tim Ryan (color), Jeff Grayson (sideline)
- Recap, Game Book

Game information

**First quarter**

- No scoring plays.

**Second quarter**

- MIN – Michael Bennett 1-yard run (Gary Anderson kick), 12:58. Vikings 7–0. **Drive: 4 plays, 17 yards, 2:02.**

**Third quarter**

- CAR – Steve Smith Sr. 14-yard pass from Rodney Peete (Jon Hilbert kick), 5:14. Tied 7–7. **Drive: 2 plays, 28 yards, 0:47.**

**Fourth quarter**

- CAR – Lamar Smith 12-yard run (Jon Hilbert kick), 13:28. Panthers 14–7. **Drive: 6 plays, 80 yards, 3:38.**
- CAR – Lamar Smith 24-yard run (Jon Hilbert kick), 7:54. Panthers 21–7. **Drive: 8 plays, 48 yards, 4:42.**
- MIN – Chris Walsh 4-yard pass from Daunte Culpepper (Gary Anderson kick), 3:29. Panthers 21–14. **Drive: 9 plays, 89 yards, 4:25.**

**Top passers**

- CAR – Rodney Peete – 20/30, 221 yards, TD, 2 INT
- MIN – Daunte Culpepper – 19/30, 191 yards, TD, 4 INT

**Top rushers**

- CAR – Lamar Smith – 30 rushes, 154 yards, 2 TD
- MIN – Daunte Culpepper – 4 rushes, 32 yards

**Top receivers**

- CAR – Steve Smith Sr. – 5 receptions, 81 yards, TD
- MIN – Moe Williams – 4 receptions, 66 yards

==== Week 4: at Green Bay Packers ====
Week 4: Carolina Panthers at Green Bay Packers

Quarter	1	2	3	4	Total
Panthers	7	0	0	7	**14**
**Packers**	3	7	0	7	**17**

at Lambeau Field, Green Bay, Wisconsin

- Date: September 29, 2002
- Game time: 1:00 p.m.
- Game weather: Overcast, 65 °F (18 °C)
- Game attendance: 63,329
- Referee: Bill Carollo (63)
- TV announcers (Fox): Pat Summerall and Brian Baldinger
- Recap, Game Book

Game information

**First quarter**

- GB – Ryan Longwell 30-yard field goal, 8:52. Packers 3–0. **Drive: 11 plays, 73 yards, 5:07.**
- CAR – Lamar Smith 3-yard run (Shayne Graham kick), 0:23. Panthers 7–3. **Drive: 8 plays, 83 yards, 4:50.**

**Second quarter**

- GB – Donald Driver 31-yard pass from Bubba Franks (Ryan Longwell kick), 1:43. Packers 10–7. **Drive: 6 plays, 70 yards, 2:04.**

**Third quarter**

- No scoring plays.

**Fourth quarter**

- CAR – Lamar Smith 2-yard run (Shayne Graham kick), 12:55. Panthers 14–10. **Drive: 5 plays, 53 yards, 2:51.**
- GB – Donald Driver 22-yard pass from Brett Favre (Ryan Longwell kick), 4:10. Packers 17–14. **Drive: 4 plays, 65 yards, 2:19.**

**Top passers**

- CAR – Rodney Peete – 10/24, 202 yards
- GB – Brett Favre – 18/32, 200 yards, TD, INT

**Top rushers**

- CAR – Lamar Smith – 22 rushes, 66 yards, 2 TD
- GB – Ahman Green – 17 rushes, 73 yards

**Top receivers**

- CAR – Steve Smith Sr. – 5 receptions, 116 yards
- GB – Donald Driver – 5 receptions, 97 yards, 2 TD

==== Week 5: vs. Arizona Cardinals ====
Week 5: Arizona Cardinals (2–2) at Carolina Panthers (3–1) – Game summary

Quarter	1	2	3	4	Total
**Cardinals**	0	6	0	10	**16**
Panthers	0	7	6	0	**13**

at Ericsson Stadium, Charlotte, North Carolina

- Date: October 6
- Game time: 1:00 p.m. PST/11:00 a.m. MST
- Game weather: 74 °F (23 °C)
- Game attendance: 72,286
- Referee: Bob McElwee
- TV announcers (FOX): Curt Menefee, Tim Ryan
- Box Score

Game information

**First quarter**

- No scoring plays

**Second quarter**

- ARI – Bill Gramática 41-yard field goal, 8:44. Cardinals 3–0.
- CAR – Isaac Byrd 31-yard pass from Rodney Peete (Shayne Graham kick), 1:58. Panthers 7–3.
- ARI – Bill Gramática 28-yard field goal, 0:16. Panthers 7–6.

**Third quarter**

- CAR – Shayne Graham 32-yard field goal, 8:52. Panthers 10–6.
- CAR – Shayne Graham 48-yard field goal, 1:29. Panthers 13–6.

**Fourth quarter**

- ARI – Freddie Jones 15-yard pass from Jake Plummer (Bill Gramática kick), 2:38. Tied 13–13.
- ARI – Bill Gramática 50-yard field goal, 0:16. Cardinals 16–13.

**Top passers**

- ARI – Jake Plummer – 18/40, 221 yards, TD, INT
- CAR – Rodney Peete – 20/34, 196 yards, TD, 2 INT

**Top rushers**

- ARI – Damien Anderson – 23 rushes, 61 yards
- CAR – Lamar Smith – 18 rushes, 49 yards

**Top receivers**

- ARI – Frank Sanders – 4 receptions, 70 yards
- CAR – Steve Smith Sr. – 5 receptions, 79 yards

**Team** – pass – rush – total – to

- ARI – 221 – 91 – 312 – 1
- CAR – 196 – 58 – 263 – 4

==== Week 16: vs. Chicago Bears ====
Week 16: Chicago Bears (4–10) at Carolina Panthers (5–9) – Game summary

Quarter	1	2	3	4	Total
Bears	7	0	0	7	**14**
**Panthers**	0	21	0	3	**24**

at Ericsson Stadium, Charlotte, North Carolina

- Date: December 22, 2002
- Game time: 1:00 pm
- Game weather: Sunny, 56 °F (13 °C)
- Game attendance: 72,602
- Referee: Terry McAulay (77)
- TV announcers (FOX): Pat Summerall, Brian Baldinger, and Dan Jiggetts
- Recap, Game Book

Game information

**First quarter**

- CHI – Dez White 76-yard pass from Chris Chandler (Paul Edinger kick), 14:13. Bears 7–0. **Drive: 2 plays, 80 yards, 0:47.**

**Second quarter**

- CAR – Dee Brown 2-yard run (Shayne Graham kick), 12:12. Tied 7–7. **Drive: 6 plays, 85 yards, 2:33.**
- CAR – Dee Brown 1-yard run (Shayne Graham kick), 8:38. Panthers 14–7. **Drive: 3 plays, 11 yards, 0:51.**
- CAR – Muhsin Muhammad 3-yard pass from Rodney Peete (Shayne Graham kick), 3:52. Panthers 21–7. **Drive: 4 plays, 41 yards, 1:54.**

**Third quarter**

- No scoring plays.

**Fourth quarter**

- CHI – Dez White 5-yard pass from Henry Burris (Paul Edinger kick), 11:48. Panthers 21–14. **Drive: 3 plays, 8 yards, 1:32.**
- CAR – Shayne Graham 25-yard field goal, 5:16. Panthers 24–14. **Drive: 4 plays, -1 yard, 2:08.**

**Top passers**

- CHI – Chris Chandler – 7/8, 113 yards, TD
- CAR – Rodney Peete – 18/35, 179 yards, TD

**Top rushers**

- CHI – Leon Johnson – 16 rushes, 29 yards
- CAR – Dee Brown – 23 rushes, 55 yards, 2 TD

**Top receivers**

- CHI – Dez White – 2 receptions, 81 yards, 2 TD
- CAR – Steve Smith Sr. – 4 receptions, 97 yards

== Standings ==
=== Division ===
NFC South
	W	L	T	PCT	DIV	CONF	PF	PA	STK
^{(2)} Tampa Bay Buccaneers	12	4	0	.750	4–2	9–3	346	196	W1
^{(6)} Atlanta Falcons	9	6	1	.594	4–2	7–5	402	314	L1
New Orleans Saints	9	7	0	.563	3–3	7–5	432	388	L3
Carolina Panthers	7	9	0	.438	1–5	4–8	258	302	W2

=== Conference ===
NFC
#	Team	Division	W	L	T	PCT	DIV	CONF	SOS	SOV
Division leaders
1 (Note: Philadelphia finished ahead of Tampa Bay and Green Bay based on conference record (11–1 vs 9–3/9–3).)	Philadelphia Eagles	East	12	4	0	.750	5–1	11–1	.469	.432
2 (Note: Tampa Bay finished ahead of Green Bay based on head-to-head victory.)	Tampa Bay Buccaneers	South	12	4	0	.750	4–2	9–3	.482	.432
3	Green Bay Packers	North	12	4	0	.750	5–1	9–3	.451	.414
4	San Francisco 49ers	West	10	6	0	.625	5–1	8–4	.504	.450
Wild Cards
5	New York Giants	East	10	6	0	.625	5–1	8–4	.482	.450
6	Atlanta Falcons	South	9	6	1	.594	4–2	7–5	.494	.429
Did not qualify for the postseason
7	New Orleans Saints	South	9	7	0	.563	3–3	7–5	.498	.566
8 (Note: St. Louis finished ahead of Seattle based on division record (4–2 to 2–4).)	St. Louis Rams	West	7	9	0	.438	4–2	5–7	.508	.446
9	Seattle Seahawks	West	7	9	0	.438	2–4	5–7	.506	.433
10 (Note: Washington finished ahead of Carolina based on common games (2–3 to 1–4))	Washington Redskins	East	7	9	0	.438	1–5	4–8	.527	.438
11	Carolina Panthers	South	7	9	0	.438	1–5	4–8	.486	.357
12	Minnesota Vikings	North	6	10	0	.375	4–2	5–7	.498	.417
13 (Note: Arizona finished ahead of Dallas based on head-to-head victory.)	Arizona Cardinals	West	5	11	0	.313	1–5	5–7	.500	.400
14	Dallas Cowboys	East	5	11	0	.313	1–5	3–9	.500	.475
15	Chicago Bears	North	4	12	0	.250	2–4	3–9	.521	.430
16	Detroit Lions	North	3	13	0	.188	1–5	3–9	.494	.375
Tiebreakers (Note: When breaking ties for three or more teams under the NFL's rules, they are first broken within divisions, then comparing only the highest-ranked remaining team from each division.)
