= 2001 Nevada Wolf Pack football team =

American college football season

2001 Nevada Wolf Pack football
- Conference: Western Athletic Conference
- Record: 3–8 (3–5 WAC)
- Head coach: Chris Tormey (2nd season)
- Offensive coordinator: Phil Earley (2nd season)
- Offensive scheme: Spread
- Defensive coordinator: Jeff Mills (2nd season)
- Base defense: 3–4
- Home stadium: Mackay Stadium

2001 Western Athletic Conference football standings
	Conf.			Overall
Team	W		L	W		L
Louisiana Tech $	7	–	1	7	–	5
Fresno State	6	–	2	11	–	3
Boise State	6	–	2	8	–	4
Hawaii	5	–	3	9	–	3
Rice	5	–	3	8	–	4
SMU	4	–	4	4	–	7
Nevada	3	–	5	3	–	8
San Jose State	3	–	5	3	–	9
UTEP	1	–	7	2	–	9
Tulsa	0	–	8	1	–	10
$ – Conference champion

The 2001 Nevada Wolf Pack football team represented the University of Nevada, Reno during the 2001 NCAA Division I-A football season. Nevada competed as a member of the Western Athletic Conference (WAC). The Wolf Pack were led by second–year head coach Chris Tormey and played their home games at Mackay Stadium.

== Schedule ==
Date	Time	Opponent	Site	Result	Attendance
September 1	6:00 p.m.	at BYU*	LaVell Edwards Stadium; Provo, UT	L 7–52	56,286
September 8	2:00 p.m.	at Colorado State*	Hughes Stadium; Fort Collins, CO	L 18–35	26,367
September 22	1:00 p.m.	Hawaii	Mackay Stadium; Reno, NV	W 28–20	15,876
October 6	1:00 p.m.	UNLV*	Mackay Stadium; Reno, NV (Battle for the Fremont Cannon)	L 12–27	24,238
October 13	1:00 p.m.	Louisiana Tech^{†}	Mackay Stadium; Reno, NV	L 42–45	15,481
October 20	5:00 p.m.	at Rice	Rice Stadium; Houston, TX	L 30–33 ^{OT}	11,390
October 27	5:00 p.m.	at Boise State	Bronco Stadium; Boise, ID (rivalry)	L 7–49	24,298
November 3	12:00 p.m.	SMU	Mackay Stadium; Reno, NV	W 35–14	13,858
November 10 (Note: The game against San Jose State was originally going to be played on September 22 but was rescheduled.)	3:30 p.m.	at San Jose State	Spartan Stadium; San Jose, CA	L 45–64	7,882
November 17	12:00 p.m.	Fresno State	Mackay Stadium; Reno, NV	L 14–61	18,412
November 24	6:00 p.m.	at UTEP	Sun Bowl; El Paso, TX	W 48–31	19,892
*Non-conference game; ^{†}Homecoming; All times are in Pacific time

== Game summaries ==
=== At BYU ===
Nevada at BYU

Team	1	2	3	4	Total
Wolf Pack	0	0	0	7	7
• Cougars	10	28	14	0	52

- Date: September 1, 2001
- Location: LaVell Edwards Stadium
  Provo, UT
- Game start: 7:06 p.m. MDT
- Elapsed time: 3 hours and 9 minutes
- Game attendance: 56,286
- Game weather: N/A
- Referee: Clair Gausman
- TV announcers (None): None

Scoring summary
1	11:59	BYU	Luke Staley 8–yard run (Matt Payne kick)	BYU 7–0
1	02:00	BYU	Matt Payne 27–yard field goal	BYU 10–0
2	13:09	BYU	Luke Staley 44–yard run (Matt Payne kick)	BYU 17–0
2	10:59	BYU	Brian McDonald 5–yard run (Matt Payne kick)	BYU 24–0
2	03:55	BYU	Reno Mahe 12–yard pass from Brandon Doman (Matt Payne kick)	BYU 31–0
2	00:39	BYU	Brian McDonald 1–yard run (Matt Payne kick)	BYU 38–0
3	12:48	BYU	Rod Wilkerson 53–yard pass from Charlie Peterson (Matt Payne kick)	BYU 45–0
3	06:02	BYU	Charlie Peterson 2–yard run (Matt Payne kick)	BYU 52–0
4	06:52	NEV	Zack Threadgill 10–yard run (Damon Fine kick)	BYU 52–7

=== At Colorado State ===
Nevada at Colorado State

Team	1	2	3	4	Total
Wolf Pack	0	7	3	8	18
• Rams	7	7	7	14	35

- Date: September 8, 2001
- Location: Hughes Stadium
  Fort Collins, CO
- Game start: 3:07 p.m. MDT
- Elapsed time: 3 hours and 9 minutes
- Game attendance: 26,367
- Game weather: Temperature: 50 °F (10 °C) • Weather: Overcast • Wind: Calm
- Referee: Cooper Castleberry
- TV announcers (None): None

Scoring summary
1	07:25	CSU	Dallas Davis 5–yard run (Kent Naughton kick)	CSU 7–0
2	11:03	NEV	Chance Kretschmer 1–yard run (Damon Fine kick)	TIE 7–7
2	09:13	CSU	Duan Ruff 3–yard run (Kent Naughton kick)	CSU 14–7
3	09:54	CSU	D.J. Busch 1–yard run (Kent Naughton kick)	CSU 21–7
3	00:17	NEV	Damon Fine 36–yard field goal	CSU 21–10
4	12:44	CSU	Pete Rebstock 38–yard pass from D.J. Busch (Kent Naughton kick)	CSU 28–10
4	02:10	CSU	Chris Pittman 35–yard pass from Bradlee Van Pelt (Kent Naughton kick)	CSU 35–10
4	00:20	NEV	Mo Jones 23–yard pass from Zack Threadgill (Chance Kretschmer pass)	CSU 35–18

=== Hawaii ===
Hawaii at Nevada

Team	1	2	3	4	Total
Warriors	10	3	0	7	20
• Wolf Pack	7	6	12	3	28

- Date: September 22, 2001
- Location: Mackay Stadium
  Reno, NV
- Game start: 1:07 p.m. PDT
- Elapsed time: N/A
- Game attendance: 15,876
- Game weather: Temperature: 88 °F (31 °C) • Weather: Clear • Wind: E 2 MPH
- Referee: Bill Athan
- TV announcers (None): None

Scoring summary
1	11:43	UH	Justin Ayat 18–yard field goal	UH 3–0
1	08:18	NEV	Jermaine Brown 17–yard pass from David Neill (Damon Fine kick)	NEV 7–3
1	04:32	UH	Channon Harris 1–yard pass from Timmy Chang (Justin Ayat kick)	UH 10–7
2	08:21	NEV	Damon Fine 24–yard field goal	TIE 10–10
2	01:23	UH	Justin Ayat 30–yard field goal	UH 13–10
2	00:08	NEV	Damon Fine 40–yard field goal	TIE 13–13
3	12:09	NEV	Nate Burleson 9–yard pass from David Neill (Damon Fine kick)	NEV 19–13
3	02:27	NEV	Jermaine Brown 7–yard pass from David Neill (Damon Fine kick)	NEV 25–13
4	09:14	UH	Chad Owens 5–yard pass from Timmy Chang (Justin Ayat kick)	NEV 25–20
4	02:55	NEV	Damon Fine 22–yard field goal	NEV 28–20

=== UNLV ===
UNLV at Nevada
(Battle for the Fremont Cannon)

Team	1	2	3	4	Total
• Rebels	0	0	10	17	27
Wolf Pack	3	3	0	6	12

- Date: October 6, 2001
- Location: Mackay Stadium
  Reno, NV
- Game start: 1:07 p.m. PDT
- Elapsed time: 3 hours and 18 minutes
- Game attendance: 24,238
- Game weather: Temperature: 75 °F (24 °C) • Weather: Partly Cloudy • Wind: 10–15 MPH
- Referee: Clair Gausman
- TV announcers (None): None

Scoring summary
1	12:40	NEV	Damon Fine 25–yard field goal	NEV 3–0
2	00:00	NEV	Damon Fine 58–yard field goal	NEV 6–0
3	08:58	UNLV	Joe Haro 4–yard run (Dillon Pieffer kick)	UNLV 7–6
3	02:53	UNLV	Dillon Pieffer 27–yard field goal	UNLV 10–6
4	13:13	UNLV	Dominique Dorsey 9–yard run (Dillon Pieffer kick)	UNLV 17–6
4	07:23	NEV	Chance Kretschmer 9–yard run (Zack Threadgill pass failed)	UNLV 17–12
4	03:26	UNLV	Dillon Pieffer 41–yard field goal	UNLV 20–12
4	00:08	UNLV	Jason Thomas 3–yard run (Dillon Pieffer kick)	UNLV 27–12

=== Louisiana Tech ===
Louisiana Tech at Nevada

Team	1	2	3	4	Total
• Bulldogs	7	14	14	10	45
Wolf Pack	14	14	7	7	42

- Date: October 13, 2001
- Location: Mackay Stadium
  Reno, NV
- Game start: 1:07 p.m. PDT
- Elapsed time: 3 hours and 27 minutes
- Game attendance: 15,481
- Game weather: Temperature: 65 °F (18 °C) • Weather: Sunny • Wind: Calm
- Referee: Bill Athan
- TV announcers (None): None

Scoring summary
1	12:58	NEV	Nate Burleson 26–yard pass from David Neill (Damon Fine kick)	NEV 7–0
1	10:20	LATECH	Delwyn Daigre 33–yard pass from Luke McCown (Josh Scobee)	TIE 7–7
1	06:57	NEV	Adrien Dugas 8–yard run (Damon Fine kick)	NEV 14–7
2	12:11	NEV	Marlon McLaughlin 73–yard punt return (Damon Fine kick)	NEV 21–7
2	06:50	LATECH	Luke McCown 3–yard run (Josh Scobee kick)	NEV 21–14
2	03:35	NEV	Chance Kretschmer 3–yard run (Damon Fine kick)	NEV 28–14
2	01:09	LATECH	John Simon 3–yard pass from Luke McCown (Josh Scobee kick)	NEV 28–21
3	14:04	LATECH	Major Richmond 29–yard pass from Luke McCown (Josh Scobee kick)	TIE 28–28
3	04:37	LATECH	Joe Smith 1–yard run (Josh Scobee kick)	LATECH 35–28
3	02:12	NEV	David Neill 5–yard run (Damon Fine kick)	TIE 35–35
4	14:52	LATECH	Corey Berlin 11–yard pass from Luke McCown (Josh Scobee kick)	LATECH 42–35
4	01:27	NEV	David Neill 10–yard run (Damon Fine kick)	TIE 42–42
4	00:05	LATECH	Josh Scobee 30–yard field goal	LATECH 45–42

=== At Rice ===
Nevada at Rice

Team	1	2	3	4	OT	Total
Wolf Pack	3	6	8	10	3	30
• Owls	0	7	13	7	6	33

- Date: October 20, 2001
- Location: Rice Stadium
  Houston, TX
- Game start: 7:00 p.m. CDT
- Elapsed time: 3 hours and 15 minutes
- Game attendance: 11,390
- Game weather: Temperature: 73 °F (23 °C) • Weather: Partly Cloudy and 68% Humidity • Wind: S/SE 6 MPH
- Referee: Frank White
- TV announcers (None): None

Scoring summary
1	10:48	NEV	Damon Fine 35–yard field goal	NEV 3–0
2	14:16	NEV	Damon Fine 18–yard field goal	NEV 6–0
2	09:43	RICE	Leroy Bradley 64–yard pass from Kyle Herm (Brandon Skeen kick)	RICE 7–6
2	00:00	NEV	Damon Fine 19–yard field goal	NEV 9–7
3	10:19	RICE	Robbie Beck 1–yard run (Brandon Skeen kick)	RICE 14–9
3	04:30	RICE	Kyle Herm 1–yard run (Brandon Skeen kick failed)	RICE 20–9
3	02:49	NEV	Chance Kretschmer 13–yard run (Erick Streelman pass)	RICE 20–17
4	11:40	NEV	Damon Fine 45–yard field goal	TIE 20–20
4	02:04	RICE	Robbie Beck 9–yard run (Brandon Skeen kick)	RICE 27–20
4	01:32	NEV	Tim Fleming 49–yard pass from David Neill (Damon Fine kick)	TIE 27–27
OT	15:00	NEV	Damon Fine 27–yard field goal	NEV 30–27
OT	15:00	RICE	Robbie Beck 25–yard run	RICE 33–30

=== At Boise State ===
Nevada at Boise State
(rivalry)

Team	1	2	3	4	Total
Wolf Pack	0	7	0	0	7
• Broncos	21	14	14	0	49

- Date: October 27, 2001
- Location: Bronco Stadium
  Boise, ID
- Game start: 6:05 p.m. MDT
- Elapsed time: 2 hours and 54 minutes
- Game attendance: 24,298
- Game weather: Temperature: 64 °F (18 °C) • Weather: Overcast • Wind: NE 8 MPH
- Referee: Drew George
- TV announcers (None): None

Scoring summary
1	10:49	BSU	Ryan Dinwiddie 8–yard run (Nick Calaycay kick)	BSU 7–0
1	06:45	BSU	David Mikell 1–yard run (Nick Calaycay kick)	BSU 14–0
1	04:47	BSU	Jay Swillie 9–yard pass from Ryan Dinwiddie (Nick Calaycay kick)	BSU 21–0
2	08:19	BSU	Jeb Putzier 57–yard pass from Ryan Dinwiddie (Nick Calaycay kick)	BSU 28–0
2	05:02	NEV	Aaron Carter 32–yard pass from Zack Threadgill (Damon Fine kick)	BSU 28–7
2	00:04	BSU	Jeb Putzier 8–yard pass from Ryan Dinwiddie (Nick Calaycay kick)	BSU 35–7
3	13:10	BSU	Brock Forsey 28–yard run (Nick Calaycay kick)	BSU 42–7
3	07:35	BSU	David Mikell 64–yard run (Nick Calaycay kick)	BSU 49–7

=== SMU ===
SMU at Nevada

Team	1	2	3	4	Total
Mustangs	0	8	0	6	14
• Wolf Pack	7	17	8	3	35

- Date: November 3, 2001
- Location: Mackay Stadium
  Reno, NV
- Game start: 12:07 p.m. PST
- Elapsed time: 2 hours and 59 minutes
- Game attendance: 13,858
- Game weather: Temperature: 52 °F (11 °C) • Weather: Clear and Light Breeze • Wind: Slight
- Referee: Cooper Castleberry
- TV announcers (None): None

Scoring summary
1	03:54	NEV	Aaron Carter 31–yard pass from David Neill (Damon Fine kick)	NEV 7–0
2	13:40	NEV	Paul Jolley 15–yard fumble recovery (Damon Fine kick)	NEV 14–0
2	11:10	NEV	Chance Kretschmer 11–yard run (Damon Fine kick)	NEV 21–0
2	05:50	NEV	Damon Fine 20–yard field goal	NEV 24–0
2	00:21	SMU	David Page 1–yard run (ShanDerrick Charles rush)	NEV 24–8
3	12:00	NEV	Erick Streelman 9–yard pass from David Neill (Nate Burleson pass)	NEV 32–8
4	14:52	NEV	Damon Fine 43–yard field goal	NEV 35–8
4	08:43	SMU	Kelan Luker 2–yard run (pass failed)	NEV 35–14

=== At San Jose State ===
Nevada at San Jose State

Team	1	2	3	4	Total
Wolf Pack	6	19	14	6	45
• Spartans	10	28	19	7	64

- Date: November 10, 2001
- Location: Spartan Stadium
  San Jose, CA
- Game start: 3:35 p.m. PST
- Elapsed time: 3 hours and 45 minutes
- Game attendance: 7,882
- Game weather: Temperature: 68 °F (20 °C) • Weather: Cool and Some Rain • Wind: N 5–10 MPH
- Referee: Bill Athan
- TV announcers (None): None

Scoring summary
1	12:36	NEV	Damon Fine 33–yard field goal	NEV 3–0
1	09:50	SJSU	Tuati Wooden 18–yard pass from Marcus Arroyo (Nick Gilliam kick)	SJSU 7–3
1	06:37	NEV	Damon Fine 37–yard field goal	SJSU 7–6
1	02:22	SJSU	Nick Gilliam 27–yard field goal	SJSU 10–6
2	14:43	SJSU	Edell Shepherd 38–yard pass from Marcus Arroyo (Nick Gilliam kick)	SJSU 17–6
2	11:20	NEV	Chance Kretschmer 1–yard run (Zack Threadgill pass failed)	SJSU 17–12
2	09:55	SJSU	Edell Shepherd 57–yard pass from Charles Pauley (Nick Gilliam kick)	SJSU 24–12
2	03:03	SJSU	Jarmar Julien 1–yard run (Nick Gilliam kick)	SJSU 31–12
2	01:51	NEV	Mo Jones 30–yard pass from David Neill (Damon Fine kick)	SJSU 31–19
2	00:53	SJSU	Jarmar Julien 1–yard run (Nick Gilliam kick)	SJSU 38–19
2	00:16	NEV	Aaron Carter 39–yard pass from David Neill (Damon Fine kick failed)	SJSU 38–25
3	11:32	NEV	David Neill 16–yard run (Damon Fine kick)	SJSU 38–32
3	08:04	SJSU	Jarmar Julien 14–yard run (Nick Gilliam kick failed)	SJSU 44–32
3	04:23	SJSU	Edell Shepherd 32–yard pass from Marcus Arroyo (pass failed)	SJSU 50–32
3	03:29	SJSU	Tuati Wooden 29–yard pass from Marcus Arroyo (Nick Gilliam kick)	SJSU 57–32
3	01:57	NEV	Chance Kretschmer 6–yard run (Damon Fine kick)	SJSU 57–39
4	05:30	NEV	Chance Kretschmer 1–yard run (David Neill pass failed)	SJSU 57–45
4	03:30	SJSU	Charles Pauley 78–yard pass from Marcus Arroyo (Nick Gilliam kick)	SJSU 64–45

=== Fresno State ===
Fresno State at Nevada

Team	1	2	3	4	Total
• Bulldogs	10	16	21	14	61
Wolf Pack	14	0	0	0	14

- Date: November 17, 2001
- Location: Mackay Stadium
  Reno, NV
- Game start: 12:05 p.m. PST
- Elapsed time: 3 hours and 24 minutes
- Game attendance: 18,412
- Game weather: Temperature: 53 °F (12 °C) • Weather: Rolling Clouds • Wind: 15–30 MPH
- Referee: Bill Athan
- TV announcers (None): None

Scoring summary
1	11:51	NEV	Mo Jones 26–yard pass from David Neill (Damon Fine kick)	NEV 7–0
1	11:20	FS	Bernard Berrian 63–yard pass from David Carr (Asen Asparuhov kick)	TIE 7–7
1	05:07	NEV	Chance Kretschmer 1–yard run (Damon Fine kick)	NEV 14–7
1	00:37	FS	Asen Asparuhov 46–yard field goal	NEV 14–10
2	14:15	FS	Asen Asparuhov 32–yard field goal	NEV 14–13
2	04:36	FS	Bernard Berrian 36–yard pass from David Carr (Asen Asparuhov kick)	FS 20–14
2	01:10	FS	Paris Gaines 11–yard pass from David Carr (pass failed)	FS 26–14
3	13:28	FS	Deandre Gilbert 25–yard pass from David Carr (Asen Asparuhov kick)	FS 33–14
3	04:57	FS	Paris Gaines 1–yard run (Asen Asparuhov kick)	FS 40–14
3	03:24	FS	Bernard Berrian 70–yard punt return (Asen Asparuhov kick)	FS 47–14
4	06:26	FS	Josh Levi 3–yard run (Brett Visintainer kick)	FS 54–14
4	01:20	FS	Therrian Fontenot 8–yard run (Brett Visintainer kick)	FS 61–14

=== At UTEP ===
Nevada at UTEP

Team	1	2	3	4	Total
• Wolf Pack	7	7	27	7	48
Miners	10	7	7	7	31

- Date: November 24, 2001
- Location: Sun Bowl
  El Paso, TX
- Game start: 7:05 p.m. MST
- Elapsed time: 2 hours and 58 minutes
- Game attendance: 19,892
- Game weather: Temperature: 52 °F (11 °C) • Weather: Clear • Wind: SE 7 MPH
- Referee: Gene Semko
- TV announcers (None): None

Scoring summary
1	12:23	UTEP	Howard Jackson 21–yard run (Keith Robinson kick)	UTEP 7–0
1	07:25	UTEP	Keith Robinson 24–yard field goal	UTEP 10–0
1	01:33	NEV	Chance Kretschmer 3–yard run (Damon Fine kick)	UTEP 10–7
2	08:21	NEV	Chance Kretschmer 8–yard run (Damon Fine kick)	NEV 14–10
2	04:36	UTEP	Joey Knapp 2–yard pass from Wesley Phillips (Keith Robinson kick)	UTEP 17–14
3	14:09	NEV	Chance Kretschmer 3–yard run (Damon Fine kick failed)	NEV 20–17
3	11:08	NEV	Chance Kretschmer 48–yard run (Damon Fine kick)	NEV 27–17
3	05:18	NEV	Chance Kretschmer 11–yard run (Zack Threadgill pass failed)	NEV 33–17
3	00:11	NEV	Erick Streelman 15–yard pass from David Neill (Erick Streelman pass)	NEV 41–17
3	00:00	UTEP	Howard Jackson 100–yard kickoff return (Keith Robinson kick)	NEV 41–24
4	06:19	UTEP	Justin Hunt 2–yard pass from Wesley Phillips (Keith Robinson kick)	NEV 41–31
4	02:18	NEV	Chance Kretschmer 9–yard run (Damon Fine kick)	NEV 48–31

== Roster ==
2001 Nevada Wolf Pack football team roster
Players			Coaches
Offense: Pos. / # / Name / Class; WR / 80 / Nate Burleson / So	Defense: Pos. / # / Name / Class	Special teams: Pos. / # / Name / Class	Head coach: Chris Tormey; Coordinators/assistant coaches Legend: (C) Team captain; (S) Suspended; (I) Ineligible; Injured; Redshirt
