= Ahmad Miller =

American football player (born 1978)

Profile
- Position: Defensive tackle

Personal information
- Born: April 10, 1978 (age 48); Bradenton, Florida, U.S.
- Listed height: 6 ft 4 in (1.93 m)
- Listed weight: 315 lb (143 kg)

Career information
- High school: Southeast (Bradenton)
- College: UNLV
- NFL draft: 2002: 7th round, 261st overall pick

Career history
- Houston Texans (2002)*; New York Giants (2003)*
- * Offseason or practice squad member only

Ahmad Rasheed Miller (born April 10, 1978) is an American former professional football defensive tackle. He was chosen with the final pick in the 2002 NFL draft, giving him the nickname Mr. Irrelevant. After being drafted by the Houston Texans, he went through training camp but was cut prior to their final preseason game. He then signed with the New York Giants.
