= 2001 Tulsa Golden Hurricane football team =

American college football season

2001 Tulsa Golden Hurricane football
- Conference: Western Athletic Conference
- Record: 1–10 (0–8 WAC)
- Head coach: Keith Burns (2nd season)
- Offensive coordinator: Jim Gilstrap (2nd season)
- Defensive coordinator: Jeff McInerney (2nd season)
- Home stadium: Skelly Stadium

2001 Western Athletic Conference football standings
	Conf.			Overall
Team	W		L	W		L
Louisiana Tech $	7	–	1	7	–	5
Fresno State	6	–	2	11	–	3
Boise State	6	–	2	8	–	4
Hawaii	5	–	3	9	–	3
Rice	5	–	3	8	–	4
SMU	4	–	4	4	–	7
Nevada	3	–	5	3	–	8
San Jose State	3	–	5	3	–	9
UTEP	1	–	7	2	–	9
Tulsa	0	–	8	1	–	10
$ – Conference champion

The 2001 Tulsa Golden Hurricane football team represented the University of Tulsa as a member of the Western Athletic Conference (WAC) during the 2001 NCAA Division I-A football season. Led by second-year head coach Keith Burns, the Golden Hurricane compiled an overall record of 1–10 with a mark of 0–8 in conference play, placing last out of ten teams in the WAC. Tulsa played home games at Skelly Stadium in Tulsa, Oklahoma.

== Schedule ==
Date	Time	Opponent	Site	TV	Result	Attendance
August 30	7:00 pm	Indiana State*	Skelly Stadium; Tulsa, OK		W 51–0	20,839
September 22	1:30 pm	Fresno State	Skelly Stadium; Tulsa, OK	FSN	L 18–37	31,087
September 29	8:05 pm	at UTEP	Sun Bowl; El Paso, TX		L 10–26	30,044
October 6	2:00 pm	New Mexico State*^{†}	Skelly Stadium; Tulsa, OK		L 7–24	17,211
October 13	7:05 pm	at Boise State	Bronco Stadium; Boise, ID		L 10–41	23,123
October 20	2:00 pm	Hawaii	Skelly Stadium; Tulsa, OK		L 15–36	17,629
October 28	4:00 pm	at San Jose State	Spartan Stadium; San Jose, CA		L 27–63	6,873
November 3	6:00 pm	at Oklahoma*	Oklahoma Memorial Stadium; Norman, OK	PPV	L 0–58	74,911
November 10	2:00 pm	at Rice	Rice Stadium; Houston, TX		L 32–59	29,317
November 17	1:30 pm	SMU	Skelly Stadium; Tulsa, OK	FSN	L 14–24	18,112
November 24	2:00 pm	Louisiana Tech	Skelly Stadium; Tulsa, OK		L 7–19	12,173
*Non-conference game; ^{†}Homecoming; All times are in Central time

== Roster ==
2001 Tulsa Golden Hurricane football team roster
Players
Coaches
Offense

Pos.	#	Name	Class
QB	16	Josh Blankenship	Jr
WR	82	Romby Bryant	So
QB	15	James Kilian	Fr
OL	72	Kevin Shaffer	Sr

Defense

Pos.	#	Name	Class
DT	96	Sam Rayburn	Jr

Special teams

Pos.	#	Name	Class

Head coach

- Keith Burns

Coordinators/assistant coaches

Legend

- (C) Team captain
- (S) Suspended
- (I) Ineligible
- Injured
- Redshirt

Roster

== After the season ==
=== 2002 NFL draft ===
The following Golden Hurricane player was selected in the 2002 NFL draft following the season.

Round	Pick	Player	Position	NFL club
7	244	Kevin Shaffer	Tackle	Atlanta Falcons
