= James Atkins (defensive tackle) =

American football player (born 1978)

No. 96, 75
- Position: Defensive tackle

Personal information
- Born: June 23, 1978 (age 48); Brooklyn, New York, U.S.
- Listed height: 6 ft 5 in (1.96 m)
- Listed weight: 325 lb (147 kg)

Career information
- High school: Roosevelt (Yonkers, New York)
- College: Virginia Union
- NFL draft: 2002: undrafted

Career history
- Miami Dolphins (2002)*; Tennessee Titans (2002–2003); San Francisco 49ers (2004)
- * Offseason or practice squad member only

Career NFL statistics
- Tackles: 13
- Fumble recoveries: 1
- Stats at Pro Football Reference

James Hodges Atkins IV (born June 23, 1978) is an American former professional football player who was a defensive tackle for two seasons in the National Football League (NFL). He played college football for the Virginia Union Panthers. He playing in the NFL for the Tennessee Titans in 2003 and the San Francisco 49ers in 2004. He was also signed with the Miami Dolphins in 2002 but did not play.
