= Nathan Black =

American football player (born 1978)

No. 83, 82
- Position: Wide receiver

Personal information
- Born: June 20, 1978 (age 48); Baton Rouge, Louisiana, U.S.
- Listed height: 6 ft 0 in (1.83 m)
- Listed weight: 190 lb (86 kg)

Career information
- High school: East Ascension (Gonzales, Louisiana)
- College: Northwestern State (1997–2001)
- NFL draft: 2002: undrafted

Career history
- Carolina Panthers (2002–2003); New Orleans Saints (2004)*; Washington Redskins (2005)*; → Rhein Fire (2005); Kansas City Brigade (2006)
- * Offseason or practice squad member only

Awards and highlights
- First-team All-Southland (1999); Second-team All-Southland (1998)

Career NFL statistics
- Games played: 5
- Kickoff return yards: 44
- Stats at Pro Football Reference

Career AFL statistics
- Receptions: 2
- Receiving yards: 15
- Tackles: 1
- Stats at ArenaFan.com

Nathan Austin Black (born June 20, 1978) is an American former professional football wide receiver who played in the National Football League (NFL) for the Carolina Panthers, New Orleans Saints and Washington Redskins. He played college football for the Northwestern State Demons. Black also had stints with the Rhein Fire of NFL Europe and Kansas City Brigade of the Arena Football League (AFL).

== Early life ==
Black was born on June 20, 1978, in Baton Rouge, Louisiana. He attended East Ascension High School in Gonzales, Louisiana and played football at quarterback.

== College career ==
Black played college football for the Northwestern State Demons from 1997 to 2001. He was twice named to the All-Southland team in 1998 and 1999. Black missed his entire junior season after suffering a torn ACL but finished his collegiate career strong with 13 receptions for 222 yards in the first round of the 2001 I-AA playoffs.

== Professional career ==
=== Carolina Panthers ===
After going undrafted in the 2002 NFL draft, Black signed with the Carolina Panthers as an undrafted free agent. On September 1, he was waived but signed to the practice squad on September 3. On October 11, Black was promoted to the active roster. He played in five games and returned three kickoffs for 44 yards. On August 27, 2003, Black was released and placed on the injured reserve due to a broken hand. On October 14, he was released by the team.

=== New Orleans Saints ===
On January 27, 2004, Black signed a two-year contract with the New Orleans Saints. On September 5, he was released and signed to the practice squad the next day. On October 10, Black was suspended four games for a second violation of the NFL's substance abuse policy. On November 30, he was released by the Saints.

=== Washington Redskins ===
On January 5, 2005, Black was signed by the Washington Redskins. On August 3, he was released by the team.

=== Rhein Fire ===
On February 14, 2005, Black was allocated to the Rhein Fire of NFL Europe. He played in six games, recording three catches for 40 yards, one touchdown and 67 kick return yards.

=== Kansas City Brigade ===
On December 1, 2005, Black signed with the Kansas City Brigade of the Arena Football League (AFL). He made the roster as a wide receiver and linebacker but only played in game before he tore his ACL again. Black had two receptions for 15 yards and one tackle.

== Personal life ==
In April 2016, Black was shot in the leg during a robbery in Baton Rouge and drove himself to the hospital.
