= 2001 Rice Owls football team =

American college football season

2001 Rice Owls football
- Conference: Western Athletic Conference
- Record: 8–4 (5–3 WAC)
- Head coach: Ken Hatfield (8th season)
- Offensive coordinator: Scott Wachenheim (1st season)
- Offensive scheme: Triple option
- Defensive coordinator: Roger Hinshaw (4th season)
- Base defense: 3–4
- Home stadium: Rice Stadium

2001 Western Athletic Conference football standings
	Conf.			Overall
Team	W		L	W		L
Louisiana Tech $	7	–	1	7	–	5
Fresno State	6	–	2	11	–	3
Boise State	6	–	2	8	–	4
Hawaii	5	–	3	9	–	3
Rice	5	–	3	8	–	4
SMU	4	–	4	4	–	7
Nevada	3	–	5	3	–	8
San Jose State	3	–	5	3	–	9
UTEP	1	–	7	2	–	9
Tulsa	0	–	8	1	–	10
$ – Conference champion

The 2001 Rice Owls football team represented Rice University as a member of the Western Athletic Conference (WAC) during the 2001 NCAA Division I-A football season. In their eighth year under head coach Ken Hatfield, the Owls compiled an overall record of 8–4 record with a mark of 5–3 in conference play, tying for fourth in the WAC. The team played home games at Rice Stadium in Houston.

== Schedule ==
Date	Time	Opponent	Site	TV	Result	Attendance
September 1	7:00 pm	at Houston*	Robertson Stadium; Houston, TX (rivalry)		W 21–14	23,985
September 8	7:00 pm	Duke*	Rice Stadium; Houston, TX		W 15–13	17,745
September 20	7:30 pm	at Nebraska*	Memorial Stadium; Lincoln, NE		L 3–48	77,344
September 29	11:00 pm	at Hawaii	Aloha Stadium; Halawa, HI		W 27–24	35,443
October 6	7:00 pm	Boise State	Rice Stadium; Houston, TX		W 45–14	14,630
October 13	11:00 am	at Navy*	Navy–Marine Corps Memorial Stadium; Annapolis, MD		W 21–13	29,106
October 20	7:00 pm	Nevada	Rice Stadium; Houston, TX		W 33–30 ^{OT}	11,390
October 27	1:30 pm	at Louisiana Tech	Joe Aillet Stadium; Ruston, LA	FSN	L 38–41 ^{OT}	23,368
November 3	6:00 pm	at Fresno State	Bulldog Stadium; Fresno, CA		L 24–52	42,881
November 10	2:00 pm	Tulsa^{†}	Rice Stadium; Houston, TX		W 59–32	29,317
November 17	7:00 pm	UTEP	Rice Stadium; Houston, TX		W 27–17	11,535
November 24	2:00 pm	at SMU	Gerald J. Ford Stadium; University Park, TX (rivalry)		L 20–37	14,820
*Non-conference game; ^{†}Homecoming; All times are in Central time
