= 2001 Fresno State Bulldogs football team =

American college football season

2001 Fresno State Bulldogs football
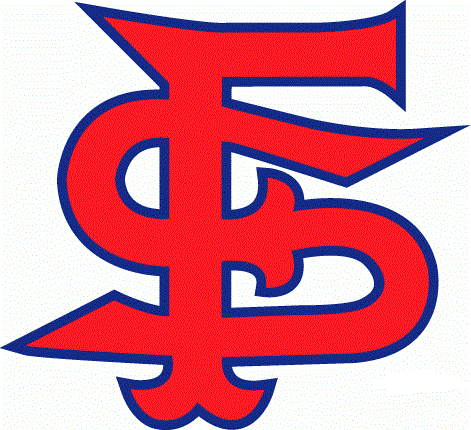

Silicon Valley Football Classic, L 35–44 vs. Michigan State
- Conference: Western Athletic Conference
- Record: 11–3 (6–2 WAC)
- Head coach: Pat Hill (5th season)
- Offensive coordinator: Andy Ludwig (4th season)
- Offensive scheme: Spread
- Defensive coordinator: Dan Brown (1st season)
- Base defense: 4–3
- Home stadium: Bulldog Stadium

2001 Western Athletic Conference football standings
	Conf.			Overall
Team	W		L	W		L
Louisiana Tech $	7	–	1	7	–	5
Fresno State	6	–	2	11	–	3
Boise State	6	–	2	8	–	4
Hawaii	5	–	3	9	–	3
Rice	5	–	3	8	–	4
SMU	4	–	4	4	–	7
Nevada	3	–	5	3	–	8
San Jose State	3	–	5	3	–	9
UTEP	1	–	7	2	–	9
Tulsa	0	–	8	1	–	10
$ – Conference champion

The 2001 Fresno State football team represented California State University, Fresno in the 2001 NCAA Division I-A football season, and competed as a member of the Western Athletic Conference. Led by head coach Pat Hill, the Bulldogs played their home games at Bulldog Stadium in Fresno, California.

They were quarterbacked by 2002 #1 overall NFL Draft selection David Carr.

== Schedule ==
Date	Time	Opponent	Rank	Site	TV	Result	Attendance
August 26	5:00 pm	at Colorado*		Folsom Field; Boulder, CO (Jim Thorpe Classic)	ESPN2	W 24–22	47,762
September 2	6:30 pm	No. 10 Oregon State*		Bulldog Stadium; Fresno, CA	ESPN2	W 44–24	42,410
September 8	9:00 am	at No. 23 Wisconsin*	No. 19	Camp Randall Stadium; Madison, WI	ESPN	W 32–20	78,506
September 22	11:30 am	at Tulsa	No. 11	Skelly Stadium; Tulsa, OK	BSN	W 37–18	31,087
September 29	7:00 pm	Louisiana Tech^{†}	No. 10	Bulldog Stadium; Fresno, CA	BSN	W 38–28	42,881
October 13	7:00 pm	at Colorado State*	No. 8	Hughes Stadium; Fort Collins, CO	ESPN2	W 25–22 ^{OT}	31,580
October 19	5:00 pm	Boise State	No. 8	Bulldog Stadium; Fresno, CA (rivalry)	ESPN	L 30–35	42,881
October 26	7:05 pm	at Hawaii	No. 18	Aloha Stadium; Halawa, HI (rivalry)	ESPN	L 34–38	35,074
November 3	4:00 pm	Rice		Bulldog Stadium; Fresno, CA	BSN	W 52–24	42,881
November 10	12:00 pm	at SMU		Gerald J. Ford Stadium; Dallas, TX	BSN	W 38–13	16,731
November 17	12:05 pm	at Nevada		Mackay Stadium; Reno, NV	BSN	W 61–14	18,412
November 23	1:00 pm	San Jose State	No. 23	Bulldog Stadium; Fresno, CA (rivalry)		W 40–21	42,881
December 1	12:00 pm	Utah State*	No. 21	Bulldog Stadium; Fresno, CA		W 70–21	42,881
December 31	12:00 pm	vs. Michigan State*	No. 20	Spartan Stadium; San Jose, CA (Silicon Valley Football Classic)	FSN	L 35–44	30,456
*Non-conference game; ^{†}Homecoming; Rankings from AP Poll released prior to the game; All times are in Pacific time

== Rankings ==
Ranking movements Legend: ██ Increase in ranking ██ Decrease in ranking — = Not ranked RV = Received votes ( ) = First-place votes
	Week																
Poll	Pre	1	2	3	4	5	6	7	8	9	10	11	12	13	14	15	Final
AP	RV	RV	19	11 (1)	10 (1)	10 (1)	8 (1)	8	18	RV	RV	RV	23	21	19	20	RV
Coaches	RV	RV	RV	15 (1)	13 (1)	11 (1)	10	10	19	RV	RV	25	22	21	21	21	RV
BCS	Not released								—	—	—	—	—	—	—	—	Not released

== Game summaries ==
=== At Colorado ===
	1	2	3	4	Total
Bulldogs	14	7	0	3	24
Buffaloes	0	13	3	6	22

=== No. 10 Oregon State ===
	1	2	3	4	Total
No. 10 Beavers	0	10	0	14	24
Bulldogs	10	7	14	13	44

=== At No. 23 Wisconsin ===
	1	2	3	4	Total
No. 19 Bulldogs	10	0	19	3	32
No. 23 Badgers	14	6	0	0	20

=== At Tulsa ===
	1	2	3	4	Total
No. 11 Bulldogs	7	10	14	6	37
Golden Hurricane	3	0	0	15	18

=== Louisiana Tech ===
	1	2	3	4	Total
LA Tech Bulldogs	7	14	0	7	28
No. 10 Fresno State Bulldogs	0	21	10	7	38

=== At Colorado State ===
	1	2	3	4	OT	Total
No. 8 Bulldogs	7	0	6	9	3	25
Rams	7	0	7	8	0	22

=== Boise State ===
	1	2	3	4	Total
Broncos	7	7	14	7	35
No. 8 Bulldogs	14	6	8	2	30

=== At Hawaii ===
	1	2	3	4	Total
No. 18 Bulldogs	10	10	7	7	34
Warriors	3	10	3	22	38

=== Rice ===
	1	2	3	4	Total
Owls	10	7	0	7	24
Bulldogs	17	14	21	0	52

=== At SMU ===
	1	2	3	4	Total
Bulldogs	0	14	10	14	38
Mustangs	10	3	0	0	13

=== At Nevada ===
	1	2	3	4	Total
Bulldogs	10	16	21	14	61
Wolf Pack	14	0	0	0	14

=== San Jose State ===
	1	2	3	4	Total
Spartans	14	0	0	7	21
No. 23 Bulldogs	7	9	10	14	40

=== Utah State ===
	1	2	3	4	Total
Aggies	7	7	7	0	21
No. 21 Bulldogs	28	28	7	7	70

=== Vs. Michigan State (Silicon Valley Classic) ===
	1	2	3	4	Total
Spartans	17	20	0	7	44
No. 20 Bulldogs	14	7	7	7	35

== Roster ==
2001 Fresno State Bulldogs football team roster
Players
Coaches
Offense

Pos.	#	Name	Class
WR	2	Bernard Berrian	So
QB	8	David Carr	Sr

Defense

Pos.	#	Name	Class
LB	40	Sam Williams	Jr
DB	24	Cameron Worrell	Jr

Special teams

Pos.	#	Name	Class

Head coach

- Pat Hill

Coordinators/assistant coaches

- Andy Ludwig (OC)
- Dan Brown (DC)
- Tom Mason (LB)

Legend

- (C) Team captain
- (S) Suspended
- (I) Ineligible
- Injured
- Redshirt
