= 2001 Louisiana Tech Bulldogs football team =

American college football season

2001 Louisiana Tech Bulldogs football

WAC champion

Humanitarian Bowl, L 24–49 vs. Clemson
- Conference: Western Athletic Conference
- Record: 7–5 (7–1 WAC)
- Head coach: Jack Bicknell Jr. (3rd season)
- Offensive coordinator: Conroy Hines (2nd season)
- Defensive coordinator: Tom Masella (3rd season)
- Captain: None
- Home stadium: Joe Aillet Stadium; Independence Stadium

2001 Western Athletic Conference football standings
	Conf.			Overall
Team	W		L	W		L
Louisiana Tech $	7	–	1	7	–	5
Fresno State	6	–	2	11	–	3
Boise State	6	–	2	8	–	4
Hawaii	5	–	3	9	–	3
Rice	5	–	3	8	–	4
SMU	4	–	4	4	–	7
Nevada	3	–	5	3	–	8
San Jose State	3	–	5	3	–	9
UTEP	1	–	7	2	–	9
Tulsa	0	–	8	1	–	10
$ – Conference champion

The 2001 Louisiana Tech Bulldogs football team represented Louisiana Tech University as a member of the Western Athletic Conference (WAC) during the 2001 NCAA Division I-A football season. Led by third-year head coach Jack Bicknell Jr., the Bulldogs played their home games at Joe Aillet Stadium in Ruston, Louisiana. Louisiana Tech finished the season with a record of 7–5 overall and a mark of 7–1 in conference play, winning the WAC title. They were invited to the Humanitarian Bowl, where they lost to Clemson.

== Schedule ==
Date	Time	Opponent	Site	TV	Result	Attendance	Source
September 1	7:00 p.m.	SMU	Independence Stadium; Shreveport, LA		W 36–6	22,505	
September 8	7:00 p.m.	at Oklahoma State*	Lewis Field; Stillwater, OK		L 23–30	41,205	
September 29	1:30 p.m.	at No. 10 Fresno State	Bulldog Stadium; Fresno, CA		L 28–38	42,881	
October 6	6:00 p.m.	San Jose State	Joe Aillet Stadium; Ruston, LA		W 41–20	19,236	
October 13	3:00 p.m.	at Nevada	Mackay Stadium; Reno, NV		W 45–42	15,481	
October 20	1:00 p.m.	at No. 20 Auburn*	Jordan–Hare Stadium; Auburn, AL	PPV	L 41–48 ^{OT}	86,036	
October 27	1:30 p.m.	Rice	Joe Aillet Stadium; Ruston, LA		W 41–38 ^{OT}	23,368	
November 3	12:00 p.m.	Boise State	Joe Aillet Stadium; Ruston, LA		W 48–42	16,621	
November 10	8:05 p.m.	at UTEP	Sun Bowl Stadium; El Paso, TX		W 53–30	24,075	
November 17	1:10 p.m.	at Kansas State*	KSU Stadium; Manhattan, KS		L 7–40	47,069	
November 24	2:00 p.m.	at Tulsa	Skelly Stadium; Tulsa, OK		W 19–7	12,173	
December 31	11:39 a.m.	vs. Clemson*	Bronco Stadium; Boise, ID (Humanitarian Bowl)	ESPN	L 24–49	23,472	
*Non-conference game; Rankings from AP Poll released prior to the game; All times are in Central time
