= Therrian Fontenot =

American football player (born 1982)

No. 39, 38
- Position: Cornerback

Personal information
- Born: June 20, 1982 (age 44); Pineville, Louisiana, U.S.
- Listed height: 5 ft 11 in (1.80 m)
- Listed weight: 190 lb (86 kg)

Career information
- High school: Leuzinger (Lawndale, California)
- College: Fresno State
- NFL draft: 2005: undrafted

Career history
- Buffalo Bills (2005)*; Green Bay Packers (2005); Cleveland Browns (2006); → Rhein Fire (2006) (loan); Philadelphia Eagles (2007–2008)*; Edmonton Eskimos (2009)*
- * Offseason or practice squad member only

Career NFL statistics
- Total tackles: 1
- Stats at Pro Football Reference

Therrian Jamaal Fontenot (born June 20, 1982) is an American former professional football player who was a cornerback in the National Football League (NFL). He was signed by the Buffalo Bills as an undrafted free agent in 2005. He played college football for the Fresno State Bulldogs.

Fontenot was also a member of the Green Bay Packers, Cleveland Browns, Philadelphia Eagles and Edmonton Eskimos.
