= John Simon (running back) =

American football player (born 1978)

Grambling State Tigers
- Title: Offensive coordinator

Personal information
- Born: December 11, 1978 (age 47); Baton Rouge, Louisiana, U.S.
- Listed height: 5 ft 10 in (1.78 m)
- Listed weight: 202 lb (92 kg)

Career information
- High school: Southern University Lab (Baton Rouge)
- College: Louisiana Tech
- NFL draft: 2002: undrafted

Career history

Playing
- Tennessee Titans (2002); Washington Redskins (2003–2004)

Coaching
- Franklin D. Roosevelt (Dallas) (2008) Wide receivers coach; Franklin D. Roosevelt (Dallas) (2009) Assistant head coach & defensive coordinator; Franklin D. Roosevelt (Dallas) (2010) Assistant athletic director & special teams coordinator; Franklin D. Roosevelt (Dallas) (2011) Interim head coach & athletic director; Franklin D. Roosevelt (Dallas) (2012) Athletic director; Southern Miss (2013–2015) Running backs coach; Louisiana (2016) Wide receivers coach; Arizona State (2017–2018) Running backs coach; Memphis (2019–2020) Passing game coordinator & wide receivers coach; Grambling State (2022–2024) Offensive coordinator; Huntington (LA) (2025–present) Head coach
- Stats at Pro Football Reference

John Ray Simon Jr. (born December 11, 1978) is an American former professional football player who was a running back in the National Football League (NFL) for the Tennessee Titans and Washington Redskins. He played college football for the Louisiana Tech Bulldogs, gaining 4,852 all-purpose yards and starting all four years.

As of 2025, he is the head coach at Huntington High School in Shreveport, Louisiana.
