= Jeff Grayson (sportscaster) =

Jeff Grayson is a sportscaster for Bally Sports Wisconsin.

== Biography ==
Grayson is a sports reporter who covers the Milwaukee Bucks and Milwaukee Brewers for Bally Sports Wisconsin as the pre-game and post-game host.

Grayson was born and raised in Milwaukee, Wisconsin, as the fourth of five children. In high school, Grayson served as a sports announcer for local high school events. After graduating high school, Grayson attended the University of Wisconsin–Milwaukee where he majored in mass communications. At age 21, Grayson's father died; before his death, he had told Grayson that if he wanted to do sports on television, he needed to get his foot in the door. Grayson contacted WBAY, and they offered him a position. His position wasn't dramatic. He received $4 an hour and 20 hours a week for getting coffee for the other employees. However his diligence led WBAY to promote him. Eventually Grayson became the producer for WBAY interviews with the Packers, Bucks, and Brewers before moving on to KSMP.

Grayson worked at KMSP for 12 years. While at KMSP Grayson served as a sports reporter, sports anchor, and eventually a sports broadcaster. After 12 years KMSP experienced management changes, and Grayson was let go. As a result, Grayson shifted his work to the public relations department and did some local Minnesota play-by-play broadcasts.

In summer 2007, Grayson was contacted by Fox Sports Wisconsin (now Bally Sports Wisconsin). They were looking for a Milwaukee native who lived in the Tri-Cities area to do road games. Grayson agreed to work with them so he could cover his favorite teams, despite living in the Minneapolis area.

Grayson grew up a Green Bay Packers fan and is still, from time to time, a Packers fan. Grayson won the Associated Press 1992 "Best Sports Story" Award and the Milwaukee Press Club's 1993 "Best Sports Program" Award for co-hosting Monday Night Kickoff. He lives in the Twin Cities with his wife and three children, and they often visit with his family. In addition to his work for Bally Sports Wisconsin, Grayson does public relations work for McDonald's.
