= Pete Campion =

American football player (born 1979)

Profile
- Position: Guard

Personal information
- Born: December 3, 1979 (age 46)
- Listed height: 6 ft 4 in (1.93 m)
- Listed weight: 307 lb (139 kg)

Career information
- College: North Dakota State
- NFL draft: 2002: 7th round, 213th overall pick

Career history
- 2002: Carolina Panthers
- 2003: Frankfurt Galaxy

Pete Campion (born December 3, 1979) is an American former professional football guard in the National Football League (NFL). He was selected by the Carolina Panthers in the seventh round of the 2002 NFL draft with the 213th overall pick. He signed contracts with the St. Louis Rams, Green Bay Packers, Seattle Seahawks, and Oakland Raiders. He was a part of the Frankfurt Galaxy of NFL Europe.
