= Brad Franklin =

American football player (born 1979)

No. 36, 21, 25, 18
- Position: Defensive back

Personal information
- Born: December 22, 1979 (age 46); Baton Rouge, Louisiana, U.S.
- Listed height: 6 ft 1 in (1.85 m)
- Listed weight: 184 lb (83 kg)

Career information
- High school: Broadmoor (Baton Rouge)
- College: Louisiana–Lafayette (1997–2001)
- NFL draft: 2002: 7th round, 258th overall pick

Career history
- Carolina Panthers (2002–2003)*; Jacksonville Jaguars (2003); Tennessee Titans (2003)*; Seattle Seahawks (2004)*; → Scottish Claymores (2004); Edmonton Eskimos (2005)*; Winnipeg Blue Bombers (2005–2006)
- * Offseason or practice squad member only

Career NFL statistics
- Games played: 4
- Tackles: 3
- Stats at Pro Football Reference

Career CFL statistics
- Games played: 16
- Games started: 12
- Tackles: 59
- Forced fumbles: 1
- Pass deflections: 3

Michael Bradford Franklin (born December 22, 1979) is an American former professional football defensive back who played in the National Football League (NFL) with the Carolina Panthers, Jacksonville Jaguars, Tennessee Titans and Seattle Seahawks. He played college football for the Louisiana–Lafayette Ragin' Cajuns. Franklin was also a member of the Scottish Claymores in NFL Europe and Edmonton Eskimos and Winnipeg Blue Bombers of the Canadian Football League (CFL).

== Early life ==
Franklin was born on December 22, 1979, in Baton Rouge, Louisiana. He attended Broadmoor High School in Baton Rouge.

== College career ==
Franklin played college football for the Louisiana–Lafayette Ragin' Cajuns from 1997 to 2001. He redshirted his first year and was a four-year letterman from 1998 to 2001. In 42 games, Franklin made 107 tackles, including four for loss, 11 pass breakups, two fumble recoveries and three interceptions. He also returned one kickoff, fumble and interception for a touchdown in his career.

Franklin ran for the Louisiana–Lafayette track team for two years, with a time 10.55 in the 100-meter dash and a 21.44 in the 200-meter.

== Professional career ==
=== Carolina Panthers ===
Franklin was selected in the seventh round, with the 258th overall selection, by the Carolina Panthers in the 2002 NFL draft. He did not play in any game for the Panthers and was released on August 25, 2003.

=== Jacksonville Jaguars ===
On August 26, 2003, Franklin was picked up off waivers by the Jacksonville Jaguars. He played four games and made three tackles before he was waived on October 7.

=== Tennessee Titans ===
On November 5, 2003, Franklin was signed by the Tennessee Titans. He was released on November 11.

=== Seattle Seahawks ===
On January 28, 2004, the Seattle Seahawks signed Franklin. He was released by the team on September 5.

=== Scottish Claymores ===
On February 9, 2004, Franklin was allocated to the Scottish Claymores of NFL Europe. He played in ten games, starting in 9, where he scored one touchdown.

=== Edmonton Eskimos ===
On September 23, 2004, Franklin signed to the practice roster of the Edmonton Eskimos of the Canadian Football League (CFL). On June 14, 2005, he was released by the team.

=== Winnipeg Blue Bombers ===
On July 3, 2005, Franklin signed with the Winnipeg Blue Bombers. he played 16 games, starting 12, recording 59 tackles, one forced fumble and three pass deflections. On June 4, 2006, he was released by the team.
