= 2001 SMU Mustangs football team =

American college football season

2001 SMU Mustangs football
- Conference: Western Athletic Conference
- Record: 4–7 (4–4 WAC)
- Head coach: Mike Cavan (5th season)
- Offensive coordinator: Larry Kueck (3rd season)
- Offensive scheme: Spread option
- Defensive coordinator: Eric Schumann (5th season)
- Base defense: 4–3
- Home stadium: Gerald J. Ford Stadium

2001 Western Athletic Conference football standings
	Conf.			Overall
Team	W		L	W		L
Louisiana Tech $	7	–	1	7	–	5
Fresno State	6	–	2	11	–	3
Boise State	6	–	2	8	–	4
Hawaii	5	–	3	9	–	3
Rice	5	–	3	8	–	4
SMU	4	–	4	4	–	7
Nevada	3	–	5	3	–	8
San Jose State	3	–	5	3	–	9
UTEP	1	–	7	2	–	9
Tulsa	0	–	8	1	–	10
$ – Conference champion

The 2001 SMU Mustangs football team represented Southern Methodist University (SMU) as a member the Western Athletic Conference (WAC) during the 2001 NCAA Division I-A football season. Led by Mike Cavan in his fifth and final season as head coach, the Mustangs compiled an overall record of 4–7 with a mark of 4–4 in conference play, placing sixth in the WAC.

== Schedule ==
Date	Time	Opponent	Site	TV	Result	Attendance
September 1	7:00 p.m.	vs. Louisiana Tech	Independence Stadium; Shreveport, LA		L 6–36	22,505
September 8	6:00 p.m.	TCU*	Gerald J. Ford Stadium; University Park, TX (rivalry)		L 10–38	24,122
September 22	5:30 p.m.	NC State*	Gerald J. Ford Stadium; University Park, TX	FSN	L 17–26	19,522
October 6	11:00 a.m.	Hawaii	Gerald J. Ford Stadium; University Park, TX	FSN	L 31–38 ^{OT}	12,082
October 13	4:00 p.m.	at San Jose State	Spartan Stadium; San Jose, CA		W 24–17	8,329
October 27	2:00 p.m.	UTEP	Gerald J. Ford Stadium; University Park, TX		W 40–14	17,037
November 3	2:00 p.m.	at Nevada	Mackay Stadium; Reno, NV		L 14–35	13,858
November 10	2:00 p.m.	Fresno State	Gerald J. Ford Stadium; University Park, TX		L 13–38	16,731
November 17	1:30 p.m.	at Tulsa	Skelly Stadium; Tulsa, OK	FSN	W 24–14	18,112
November 24	2:00 p.m.	Rice	Gerald J. Ford Stadium; University Park, TX (rivalry)		W 37–20	14,820
December 1	12:30 p.m.	at North Carolina*	Kenan Memorial Stadium; Chapel Hill, NC		L 10–19	45,500
*Non-conference game; All times are in Central time

== Roster ==
2001 SMU Mustangs football team roster
Players
Coaches
Offense

Pos.	#	Name	Class
RB	24	Kris Briggs	Jr
WR	21	Chris Cunningham	Jr
G	64	Scott Dale	Fr
WR	17	Billy Ford	Jr
WR	5	Johnnie Freeman	Jr
TE	86	John Hampton	Jr
OT	75	Sterling Harris	So
QB	7	Kelan Luker	Jr
RB	32	Keylon Kincade	So
WR	82	Ryan Wannemacher	Fr

Defense

Pos.	#	Name	Class
DE	11	Kevin Aldridge	Sr
DE	9	Khalid Beard	Jr
DT	50	Warrie Birdwell	Jr
LB	46	Brian Bischoff	So
DT	98	John David Blagg	So
CB	1	Kevin Garrett	Jr
S	22	Shane O'Neill	Jr
CB	39	James Orr	Jr
DT	95	Chris Post	Sr
S	8	Leroy Price	So
LB	42	Billy Jack Williams	Jr

Special teams

Pos.	#	Name	Class
K	16	Adam Walterscheid	Sr

Head coach

- Mike Cavan

Coordinators/assistant coaches

- Phil Jones (special teams / tight ends / offensive tackles)

Legend

- (C) Team captain
- (S) Suspended
- (I) Ineligible
- Injured
- Redshirt

Roster
Last update: 2001-12-21
