= 2001 UTEP Miners football team =

American college football season

2001 UTEP Miners football
- Conference: Western Athletic Conference
- Record: 2–9 (1–7 WAC)
- Head coach: Gary Nord (2nd season)
- Offensive coordinator: Patrick Higgins (2nd season)
- Defensive coordinator: Bob Wagner (1st season)
- Home stadium: Sun Bowl

2001 Western Athletic Conference football standings
	Conf.			Overall
Team	W		L	W		L
Louisiana Tech $	7	–	1	7	–	5
Fresno State	6	–	2	11	–	3
Boise State	6	–	2	8	–	4
Hawaii	5	–	3	9	–	3
Rice	5	–	3	8	–	4
SMU	4	–	4	4	–	7
Nevada	3	–	5	3	–	8
San Jose State	3	–	5	3	–	9
UTEP	1	–	7	2	–	9
Tulsa	0	–	8	1	–	10
$ – Conference champion

The 2001 UTEP Miners football team represented the University of Texas at El Paso (UTEP) as a member of the Western Athletic Conference (WAC) during the 2001 NCAA Division I-A football season. Led by second-year head coach Gary Nord, the Miners compiled an overall record of 2–9 with a mark of 1–7 in conference play, placing ninth in the WAC. The team played home games at the Sun Bowl in El Paso, Texas.

== Schedule ==
Date	Time	Opponent	Site	TV	Result	Attendance	Source
September 1	6:00 pm	at New Mexico*	University Stadium; Albuquerque, NM	KKWB	L 6–26	41,771	
September 8	7:05 pm	Texas Southern*	Sun Bowl; El Paso, TX		W 52–6	37,741	
September 22	6:05 pm	at Boise State	Bronco Stadium; Boise, ID		L 17–42	23,517	
September 29	7:05 pm	Tulsa	Sun Bowl; El Paso, TX		W 26–10	30,044	
October 6	1:00 pm	at Alabama*	Legion Field; Birmingham, AL	PPV	L 7–56	77,146	
October 13	10:00 pm	at Hawaii	Aloha Stadium; Halawa, HI		L 7–66	34,128	
October 20	7:05 pm	San Jose State^{†}	Sun Bowl; El Paso, TX		L 28–40	30,048	
October 27	1:00 pm	at SMU	Gerald J. Ford Stadium; Dallas, TX	KKWB	L 14–40	17,037	
November 10	7:05 pm	Louisiana Tech	Sun Bowl; El Paso, TX		L 30–53	24,075	
November 17	6:00 pm	at Rice	Rice Stadium; Houston, TX		L 17–27	11,535	
November 24	7:05 pm	Nevada	Sun Bowl; El Paso, TX		L 31–48	19,892	
*Non-conference game; ^{†}Homecoming; All times are in Mountain time
