= 2001 Boise State Broncos football team =

American college football season

2001 Boise State Broncos football
- Conference: Western Athletic Conference
- Record: 8–4 (6–2 WAC)
- Head coach: Dan Hawkins (1st season)
- Offensive coordinator: Chris Petersen (1st season)
- Defensive coordinator: Bob Gregory (1st season)
- Home stadium: Bronco Stadium

2001 Western Athletic Conference football standings
	Conf.			Overall
Team	W		L	W		L
Louisiana Tech $	7	–	1	7	–	5
Fresno State	6	–	2	11	–	3
Boise State	6	–	2	8	–	4
Hawaii	5	–	3	9	–	3
Rice	5	–	3	8	–	4
SMU	4	–	4	4	–	7
Nevada	3	–	5	3	–	8
San Jose State	3	–	5	3	–	9
UTEP	1	–	7	2	–	9
Tulsa	0	–	8	1	–	10
$ – Conference champion

The 2001 Boise State Broncos football team represented Boise State University as a member of the Western Athletic Conference (WAC) during the 2001 NCAA Division I-A football season. Led by first-year head coach Dan Hawkins, the Broncos compiled an overall record of 8–4 with a mark of 6–2 in conference play, tying for second place in the WAC. Despite finishing bowl eligible, Boise State was not invited to a bowl game. The team played home games on campus, at Bronco Stadium in Boise, Idaho.

The loss to Washington State on September 8 was Boise State's last regular season loss at Bronco Stadium for over a decade. Two weeks later, the Broncos began a 65-game regular season home winning streak that continued through the 2011 season. Boise State lost the 2005 MPC Computers Bowl at Bronco Stadium, but the bowl game was not considered a home game.

This was the first season in which Boise State and rival Idaho were not in the same conference since the 1969 season, when the Broncos were an NAIA independent. This prompted the introduction of the Governor's Trophy by Idaho governor and University of Idaho alumnus, Dirk Kempthorne, to continue the series. The first game played for the trophy was won easily by Boise State, and, ironically, played out of state, at Martin Stadium in Pullman, Washington. Idaho joined the WAC in 2005, and the rivalry returned to a conference game for six seasons. Boise State joined the Mountain West Conference after the 2010 season. The 2010 contest remains the most recent meeting of the rivals, and the Broncos hold a 12-game winning streak over the Vandals, who last won in 1998.

== Schedule ==
Date	Time	Opponent	Site	TV	Result	Attendance	Source
September 1	5:00 pm	at No. 21 South Carolina*	Williams–Brice Stadium; Columbia, SC		L 13–32	83,019	
September 8	6:00 pm	Washington State*	Bronco Stadium; Boise, ID		L 20–41	27,697	
September 22	6:00 pm	UTEP	Bronco Stadium; Boise, ID		W 42–17	23,517	
September 29	8:00 pm	at Idaho*	Martin Stadium; Pullman, WA (rivalry)		W 45–13	20,359	
October 6	6:00 pm	at Rice	Rice Stadium; Houston, TX		L 14–45	14,630	
October 13	5:00 pm	Tulsa^{†}	Bronco Stadium; Boise, ID		W 41–10	23,123	
October 19	6:00 pm	at No. 8 Fresno State	Bulldog Stadium; Fresno, CA (rivalry)	ESPN	W 35–30	42,881	
October 27	6:00 pm	Nevada	Bronco Stadium; Boise, ID (rivalry)		W 49–7	24,298	
November 3	11:00 am	at Louisiana Tech	Joe Aillet Stadium; Ruston, LA		L 42–48	16,621	
November 10	9:00 pm	at Hawaii	Aloha Stadium; Halawa, HI		W 28–21	45,012	
November 17	1:00 pm	San Jose State	Bronco Stadium; Boise, ID		W 56–6	24,388	
November 24	1:00 pm	Central Michigan*	Bronco Stadium; Boise, ID		W 26–10	19,963	
*Non-conference game; ^{†}Homecoming; Rankings from AP Poll released prior to the game; All times are in Mountain time
