= 2001 San Jose State Spartans football team =

American college football season

2001 San Jose State Spartans football
- Conference: Western Athletic Conference
- Record: 3–9 (3–5 WAC)
- Head coach: Fitz Hill (1st season)
- Offensive coordinator: Norman Joseph (1st season)
- Defensive coordinator: Ronnie Lee (1st season)
- Home stadium: Spartan Stadium

2001 Western Athletic Conference football standings
| | Conf. | | | Overall |
| Team | W | | L | W | | L |
|---|---|---|---|---|---|---|
| Louisiana Tech $ | 7 | – | 1 | 7 | – | 5 |
| Fresno State | 6 | – | 2 | 11 | – | 3 |
| Boise State | 6 | – | 2 | 8 | – | 4 |
| Hawaii | 5 | – | 3 | 9 | – | 3 |
| Rice | 5 | – | 3 | 8 | – | 4 |
| SMU | 4 | – | 4 | 4 | – | 7 |
| Nevada | 3 | – | 5 | 3 | – | 8 |
| San Jose State | 3 | – | 5 | 3 | – | 9 |
| UTEP | 1 | – | 7 | 2 | – | 9 |
| Tulsa | 0 | – | 8 | 1 | – | 10 |
$ – Conference champion

The 2001 San Jose State Spartans football team represented San Jose State University as a member of the Western Athletic Conference (WAC) the 2001 NCAA Division I-A football season. Led by first-year head coach Fitz Hill, the Spartans compiled an overall record of 3–9 with a mark of 3–5 in conference play, tying for seventh place in the WAC. San Jose State played home games at Spartan Stadium in San Jose, California.

== Schedule ==
| Date | Time | Opponent | Site | TV | Result | Attendance |
|---|---|---|---|---|---|---|
| September 1 | 3:30 p.m. | at USC* | Los Angeles Memorial Coliseum; Los Angeles, CA | FSW2, FSNBA | L 10–21 | 45,568 |
| September 8 | 12:30 p.m. | at Colorado* | Folsom Field; Boulder, CO | | L 15–51 | 40,338 |
| September 29 | 7:15 p.m. | at Arizona State* | Sun Devil Stadium; Tempe, AZ | FSAZ | L 15–53 | 45,528 |
| October 6 | 4:00 p.m. | at Louisiana Tech | Joe Aillet Stadium; Ruston, LA | | L 20–41 | 19,236 |
| October 13 | 2:00 p.m. | SMU^{†} | Spartan Stadium; San Jose, CA | | L 17–24 | 8,329 |
| October 20 | 6:00 p.m. | at UTEP | Sun Bowl; El Paso, TX | | W 40–28 | 30,048 |
| October 27 | 2:00 p.m. | Tulsa | Spartan Stadium; San Jose, CA | | W 63–27 | 6,873 |
| November 3 | 8:00 p.m. | at Hawaii | Aloha Stadium; Halawa, HI (Dick Tomey Legacy Game) | KFVE | L 10-34 | 36,566 |
| November 10^{[A]} | 3:30 p.m. | Nevada | Spartan Stadium; San Jose, CA | | W 64–45 | 7,882 |
| November 17 | 12:00 p.m. | at Boise State | Bronco Stadium; Boise, ID | | L 6–56 | 24,388 |
| November 23 | 1:00 p.m. | at No. 23 Fresno State | Bulldog Stadium; Fresno, CA (rivalry) | | L 21–40 | 42,881 |
| December 1^{[B]} | 2:00 p.m. | No. 12 Stanford* | Spartan Stadium; San Jose, CA (rivalry) | | L 14–41 | 17,745 |
*Non-conference game; ^{†}Homecoming; Rankings from AP Poll released prior to the game; All times are in Pacific time

- A. The game against Nevada was originally to be played on September 22 but was rescheduled.
- B. The game against Stanford was originally to be played on September 15 but was rescheduled because of the September 11 attacks.

== Game summaries ==
=== At USC ===
| | 1 | 2 | 3 | 4 | Total |
|---|---|---|---|---|---|
| Spartans | | | | | 0 |
| Trojans | | | | | 0 |

=== At Colorado ===
| | 1 | 2 | 3 | 4 | Total |
|---|---|---|---|---|---|
| Spartans | | | | | 0 |
| Buffaloes | | | | | 0 |

=== At Arizona State ===
| | 1 | 2 | 3 | 4 | Total |
|---|---|---|---|---|---|
| Spartans | | | | | 0 |
| Sun Devils | | | | | 0 |

=== At Louisiana Tech ===
| | 1 | 2 | 3 | 4 | Total |
|---|---|---|---|---|---|
| Spartans | | | | | 0 |
| Bulldogs | | | | | 0 |

=== SMU ===
| | 1 | 2 | 3 | 4 | Total |
|---|---|---|---|---|---|
| Mustangs | | | | | 0 |
| Spartans | | | | | 0 |

=== At UTEP ===
| | 1 | 2 | 3 | 4 | Total |
|---|---|---|---|---|---|
| Spartans | | | | | 0 |
| Miners | | | | | 0 |

=== Tulsa ===
| | 1 | 2 | 3 | 4 | Total |
|---|---|---|---|---|---|
| Golden Hurricane | | | | | 0 |
| Spartans | | | | | 0 |

=== At Hawaii ===
| | 1 | 2 | 3 | 4 | Total |
|---|---|---|---|---|---|
| Spartans | | | | | 0 |
| Warriors | | | | | 0 |

=== Nevada ===
| | 1 | 2 | 3 | 4 | Total |
|---|---|---|---|---|---|
| Wolf Pack | | | | | 0 |
| Spartans | | | | | 0 |

=== At Boise State ===
| | 1 | 2 | 3 | 4 | Total |
|---|---|---|---|---|---|
| Spartans | | | | | 0 |
| Broncos | | | | | 0 |

=== At No. 23 Fresno State ===
| | 1 | 2 | 3 | 4 | Total |
|---|---|---|---|---|---|
| Spartans | | | | | 0 |
| No. 23 Bulldogs | | | | | 0 |

=== No. 12 Stanford ===
| | 1 | 2 | 3 | 4 | Total |
|---|---|---|---|---|---|
| No. 12 Cardinal | | | | | 0 |
| Spartans | | | | | 0 |

== Coaching staff ==
| Name | Position | Seasons at San Jose State | Alma mater |
|---|---|---|---|
| Fitz Hill | Head coach | 1 | Ouachita Baptist (1987) |
| Earl Buckingham | Assistant head coach, defensive line | 1 | Arkansas (1983) |
| Norman Joseph | Offensive coordinator, quarterbacks | 1 | Mississippi State (1977) |
| Ronnie Lee | Defensive coordinator, defensive backs | 1 | Washington State (1989) |
| Charles Nash | Running backs | 1 | Arizona (1976) |
| Kyle O'Quinn | Tight ends | 1 | Henderson State (1986) |
| Tom Quinn | Special teams, defensive assistant | 3 | Arizona (1990) |
| Charles Roche | Offensive line | 1 | Eastern Illinois (1997) |
| Kenwick Thompson | Linebackers | 1 | Harding (1992) |
| Keith Williams | Wide receivers | 1 | San Diego State (1996) |
