= 2001 Hawaii Warriors football team =

American college football season

2001 Hawaii Warriors football
- Conference: Western Athletic Conference
- Record: 9–3 (5–3 WAC)
- Head coach: June Jones (3rd season)
- Offensive scheme: Run and shoot
- Defensive coordinator: Kevin Lempa (2nd season)
- Base defense: 4–3
- Home stadium: Aloha Stadium

2001 Western Athletic Conference football standings
	Conf.			Overall
Team	W		L	W		L
Louisiana Tech $	7	–	1	7	–	5
Fresno State	6	–	2	11	–	3
Boise State	6	–	2	8	–	4
Hawaii	5	–	3	9	–	3
Rice	5	–	3	8	–	4
SMU	4	–	4	4	–	7
Nevada	3	–	5	3	–	8
San Jose State	3	–	5	3	–	9
UTEP	1	–	7	2	–	9
Tulsa	0	–	8	1	–	10
$ – Conference champion

The 2001 Hawaii Warriors football team represented the University of Hawaii at Manoa in the 2001 NCAA Division I-A football season. Hawaii finished the 2001 season with a 9–3 record, going 5–3 in Western Athletic Conference (WAC) play.

== Schedule ==
Date	Time	Opponent	Site	TV	Result	Attendance	Source
September 8	6:05 pm	vs. No. 2 (I-AA) Montana*	War Memorial Stadium; Wailuku, HI		W 30–12	12,863	
September 22	10:05 am	at Nevada	Mackay Stadium; Reno, NV		L 20–28	15,876	
September 29	6:05 pm	Rice	Aloha Stadium; Halawa, HI		L 24–27	35,443	
October 6	6:00 am	at SMU	Gerald J. Ford Stadium; Dallas, TX	FSN	W 38–31 ^{OT}	12,082	
October 13	6:05 pm	UTEP	Aloha Stadium; Halawa, HI		W 66–7	34,128	
October 20	9:00 am	at Tulsa	Skelly Stadium; Tulsa, OK		W 36–15	17,629	
October 26	4:00 pm	No. 18 Fresno State	Aloha Stadium; Halawa, HI (rivalry)	ESPN	W 38–34	37,900	
November 3	6:05 pm	San Jose State	Aloha Stadium; Halawa, HI (rivalry)		W 34–10	36,566	
November 10	6:05 pm	Boise State^{†}	Aloha Stadium; Halawa, HI		L 21–28	45,012	
November 17	6:05 pm	Miami (OH)*	Aloha Stadium; Halawa, HI		W 52–51	33,148	
November 23	6:05 pm	Air Force*	Aloha Stadium; Halawa, HI (rivalry)		W 52–30	41,148	
December 8	11:05 am	No. 9 BYU*	Aloha Stadium; Halawa, HI	ESPN2	W 72–45	50,000	
*Non-conference game; ^{†}Homecoming; Rankings from AP Poll released prior to the game; All times are in Hawaii–Aleutian time
