= 2001 Cal Poly Mustangs football team =

American college football season

2001 Cal Poly Mustangs football
- Conference: Independent
- Record: 6–5
- Head coach: Rich Ellerson (1st season)
- Home stadium: Mustang Stadium

2001 NCAA Division I-AA independents football standings
	Conf.			Overall
Team	W		L	W		L
Cal Poly		–		6	–	5
Saint Mary's		–		6	–	5
Samford		–		5	–	5
Charleston Southern		–		5	–	6
Morris Brown		–		5	–	6
Florida Atlantic		–		4	–	6
Cal State Northridge		–		3	–	7
Liberty		–		3	–	8
Savannah State		–		2	–	7
Elon		–		2	–	9
Southern Utah		–		2	–	9

The 2001 Cal Poly Mustangs football team represented California Polytechnic State University, San Luis Obispo as an independent during the 2001 NCAA Division I-AA football season. Led by first-year head coach Rich Ellerson, Cal Poly compiled a record of 6–5. The team outscored its opponents 292 to 248 for the season. The Mustangs played home games at Mustang Stadium in San Luis Obispo, California.

== Schedule ==
Date	Opponent	Site	Result	Attendance	Source
September 1	No. 2 Montana	Mustang Stadium; San Luis Obispo, CA	L 17–31	8,007	
September 8	Sacramento State	Mustang Stadium; San Luis Obispo, CA	W 55–21	5,812	
September 22	at Montana State	Bobcat Stadium; Bozeman, MT	W 34–6		
September 29	Western Washington	Mustang Stadium; San Luis Obispo, CA	L 9–17		
October 13	Southern Utah	Mustang Stadium; San Luis Obispo, CA	W 34–24		
October 20	at No. 10 (D-II) UC Davis	Toomey Field; Davis, CA (rivalry)	W 31–28		
October 27	at Alcorn State	Jack Spinks Stadium; Lorman, MS	W 21–12		
November 3	at Weber State	Wildcat Stadium; Ogden, UT	L 40–43 ^{4OT}	4,383	
November 10	Cal State Northridge	Mustang Stadium; San Luis Obispo, CA	L 28–35		
November 17	at No. 8 Northern Iowa	UNI-Dome; Cedar Falls, IA	L 13–31		
November 24	at Saint Mary's	Saint Mary's Stadium; Moraga, CA	W 10–0		
Rankings from The Sports Network Poll released prior to the game

== Team players in the NFL ==
The following Cal Poly Mustang players were selected in the 2002 NFL draft.

Player	Position	Round	Overall	NFL team
Seth Burford	Quarterback	7	216	San Diego Chargers
