= 2001 Sacramento State Hornets football team =

American college football season

2001 Sacramento State Hornets football
- Conference: Big Sky Conference
- Record: 2–9 (1–6 Big Sky)
- Head coach: John Volek (7th season)
- Home stadium: Hornet Stadium

2001 Big Sky Conference football standings
	Conf.			Overall
Team	W		L	W		L
No. 1 Montana $^	7	–	0	15	–	1
No. 16 Northern Arizona ^	5	–	2	9	–	4
Portland State	5	–	2	7	–	4
Montana State	4	–	3	5	–	6
Eastern Washington	3	–	4	7	–	4
Weber State	2	–	5	3	–	8
Idaho State	1	–	6	4	–	7
Sacramento State	1	–	6	2	–	9
$ – Conference champion; ^ – NCAA Division I-AA playoff participant; Rankings from The Sports Network poll

The 2001 Sacramento State Hornets football team represented California State University, Sacramento as a member of the Big Sky Conference during the 2001 NCAA Division I-AA football season. Led by seventh-year head coach John Volek, Sacramento State compiled an overall record of 2–9 with a mark of 1–6 in conference play, tying for seventh place in the Big Sky. The team was outscored by its opponents 424 to 249 for the season. The Hornets played home games at Hornet Stadium in Sacramento, California.

== Schedule ==
Date	Opponent	Site	Result	Attendance	Source
September 1	Saint Mary's*	Hornet Stadium; Sacramento, CA	W 13–6 ^{OT}	15,173	
September 8	at Cal Poly*	Mustang Stadium; San Luis Obispo, CA	L 21–55	5,812	
September 22	Idaho State	Hornet Stadium; Sacramento, CA	W 33–27	8,887	
September 29	at Weber State	Stewart Stadium; Ogden, UT	L 31–38	4,192	
October 6	No. 2 Montana	Hornet Stadium; Sacramento, CA	L 7–42	13,586	
October 13	at Montana State	Bobcat Stadium; Bozeman, MT	L 0–20	11,817	
October 20	Eastern Washington	Hornet Stadium; Sacramento, CA	L 35–42 ^{OT}	8,457	
October 27	No. 15 (D-II) UC Davis*	Hornet Stadium; Sacramento, CA (Causeway Classic)	L 0–43	17,328	
November 3	at Cal State Northridge*	North Campus Stadium; Northridge, CA	L 36–49	5,286	
November 10	No. 16 Northern Arizona	Hornet Stadium; Sacramento, CA	L 40–50	5,510	
November 24	at Portland State	PGE Park; Portland, OR	L 33–52	3,747	
*Non-conference game; Rankings from The Sports Network Poll released prior to the game
