= 2001 Nicholls State Colonels football team =

American college football season

2001 Nicholls State Colonels football
- Conference: Southland Football League
- Record: 3–8 (1–5 Southland)
- Head coach: Daryl Daye (3rd season)
- Offensive coordinator: Jeff Richards (1st season)
- Defensive coordinator: Jay Thomas (3rd season)
- Home stadium: John L. Guidry Stadium

2001 Southland Football League standings
| | Conf. | | | Overall |
| Team | W | | L | W | | L |
|---|---|---|---|---|---|---|
| No. 7 Sam Houston State +^ | 5 | – | 1 | 10 | – | 3 |
| No. 13 McNeese State +^ | 5 | – | 1 | 8 | – | 4 |
| No. 14 Northwestern State ^ | 4 | – | 2 | 8 | – | 4 |
| Stephen F. Austin | 4 | – | 2 | 6 | – | 5 |
| Jacksonville State | 2 | – | 4 | 5 | – | 6 |
| Nicholls State | 1 | – | 5 | 3 | – | 8 |
| Southwest Texas State | 0 | – | 6 | 4 | – | 7 |
+ – Conference co-champions; ^ – NCAA Division I-AA playoff participant; Rankings from The Sports Network poll

The 2001 Nicholls State Colonels football team represented Nicholls State University as a member of the Southland Football League during the 2001 NCAA Division I-AA football season. Led by third-year head Daryl Daye, the Colonels compiled an overall record of 3–8 with a mark of 1–5 in conference play, placing sixth in the Southland. Nicholls State played home games at John L. Guidry Stadium in Thibodaux, Louisiana.

== Schedule ==
| Date | Time | Opponent | Site | Result | Attendance | Source |
|---|---|---|---|---|---|---|
| September 1 | | at Louisiana–Lafayette* | Cajun Field; Lafayette, LA | L 0–20 | 13,767 | |
| September 8 | 7:00 p.m. | at Jacksonville State | Paul Snow Stadium; Jacksonville, AL | L 15–34 | 9,289 | |
| September 22 | | at Troy State* | Veterans Memorial Stadium; Troy, AL | L 0–26 | 18,154 | |
| September 29 | 6:30 p.m. | Samford* | John L. Guidry Stadium; Thibodaux, LA | W 20–16 | 4,281 | |
| October 13 | | No. 19 Sam Houston State | John L. Guidry Stadium; Thibodaux, LA | L 32–35 | | |
| October 20 | | at No. 17 Northwestern State | Harry Turpin Stadium; Natchitoches, LA (rivalry) | L 14–47 | | |
| October 27 | | Southwest Texas State | John L. Guidry Stadium; Thibodaux, LA (Battle for the Paddle) | W 33–14 | | |
| November 3 | | at No. 22 Stephen F. Austin | Homer Bryce Stadium; Nacogdoches, TX | L 21–23 | 6,231 | |
| November 10 | | No. 9 Grambling State* | John L. Guidry Stadium; Thibodaux, LA | L 27–38 | 7,371 | |
| November 17 | | No. 11 McNeese State | John L. Guidry Stadium; Thibodaux, LA | L 27–34 | 4,107 | |
| November 22 | | at Arkansas State* | Indian Stadium; Jonesboro, AR | W 28–22 | | |
*Non-conference game; Rankings from The Sports Network Poll released prior to the game; All times are in Central time
