= 2001 Cal State Northridge Matadors football team =

American college football season

2001 Cal State Northridge Matadors football
- Conference: Independent
- Record: 3–7
- Head coach: Jeff Kearin (3rd season)
- Home stadium: North Campus Stadium

2001 NCAA Division I-AA independents football standings
	Conf.			Overall
Team	W		L	W		L
Cal Poly		–		6	–	5
Saint Mary's		–		6	–	5
Samford		–		5	–	5
Charleston Southern		–		5	–	6
Morris Brown		–		5	–	6
Florida Atlantic		–		4	–	6
Cal State Northridge		–		3	–	7
Liberty		–		3	–	8
Savannah State		–		2	–	7
Elon		–		2	–	9
Southern Utah		–		2	–	9

The 2001 Cal State Northridge Matadors football team represented California State University, Northridge as an independent during the 2001 NCAA Division I-AA football season. Led by third-year head coach Jeff Kearin, Cal State Northridge compiled a record of 3–7. The Matadors played home games at North Campus Stadium in Northridge, California.

This was the last season for Cal State Northridge football. On November 20, 2001, the president of the university announced the termination of the football program after 40 seasons due to "looming budget concerns".

== Schedule ==
Date	Opponent	Site	Result	Attendance	Source
August 30	at Northern Arizona	Walkup Skydome; Flagstaff, AZ	L 17–30	4,633	
September 15	Southwest Texas State	North Campus Stadium; Northridge, CA	Canceled		
September 22	at Stephen F. Austin	Homer Bryce Stadium; Nacogdoches, TX	L 27–30 ^{OT}		
September 29	at Montana State	Bobcat Stadium; Bozeman, MT	L 27–34	8,407	
October 6	Western Oregon	North Campus Stadium; Northridge, CA	W 47–37	1,912	
October 13	at No. 13 UC Davis	Toomey Field; Davis, CA	L 31–38	6,600	
October 20	at Troy State	Veterans Memorial Stadium; Troy, AL	L 31–44	16,852	
October 27	at Eastern Washington	Woodward Field; Cheney, WA	L 35–63	4,453	
November 3	Sacramento State	North Campus Stadium; Northridge, CA	W 49–36	5,286	
November 10	at Cal Poly	Mustang Stadium; San Luis Obispo, CA	W 35–28		
November 17	at Portland State	PGE Park; Portland, OR	L 43–50	4,017	
Rankings from The Sports Network Poll released prior to the game

== Team players in the NFL ==
No Cal State Northridge players were selected in the 2002 NFL draft. The following finished their Cal State Northridge career in 2001, were not drafted, but played in the NFL.

Player	Position	First NFL team
Atnaf Harris	Wide receiver	2002 Houston Texans
