= 2001 Weber State Wildcats football team =

American college football season

2001 Weber State Wildcats football
- Conference: Big Sky Conference
- Record: 3–8 (2–5 Big Sky)
- Head coach: Jerry Graybeal (4th season)
- Home stadium: Stewart Stadium

2001 Big Sky Conference football standings
	Conf.			Overall
Team	W		L	W		L
No. 1 Montana $^	7	–	0	15	–	1
No. 16 Northern Arizona ^	5	–	2	9	–	4
Portland State	5	–	2	7	–	4
Montana State	4	–	3	5	–	6
Eastern Washington	3	–	4	7	–	4
Weber State	2	–	5	3	–	8
Idaho State	1	–	6	4	–	7
Sacramento State	1	–	6	2	–	9
$ – Conference champion; ^ – NCAA Division I-AA playoff participant; Rankings from The Sports Network poll

The 2001 Weber State Wildcats football team represented Weber State University as a member of the Big Sky Conference during the 2001 NCAA Division I-AA football season. Led by fourth-year head coach Jerry Graybeal, the Wildcats compiled an overall record of 3–8, with a mark of 2–5 in conference play, and finished sixth in the Big Sky. The team played home games at Stewart Stadium in Ogden, Utah.

== Schedule ==
Date	Opponent	Site	Result	Attendance	Source
September 1	at Southern Utah*	Eccles Coliseum; Cedar City, UT (rivalry)	L 21–28	9,014	
September 8	Montana State	Stewart Stadium; Ogden, UT	L 17–32		
September 15	Eastern Oregon*	Stewart Stadium; Ogden, UT	Canceled	N/A	
September 22	at No. 18 Eastern Washington	Woodward Field; Cheney, WA	L 26–50	5,132	
September 29	Sacramento State	Stewart Stadium; Ogden, UT	W 38–31	4,192	
October 6	at Arkansas*	Donald W. Reynolds Razorback Stadium; Fayetteville, AR	L 19–42	52,683	
October 13	No. 22 Northern Arizona	Stewart Stadium; Ogden, UT	L 32–42	6,893	
October 20	at Portland State	PGE Park; Portland, OR	L 43–65		
October 27	Idaho State	Stewart Stadium; Ogden, UT	W 42–17	4,195	
November 3	Cal Poly*	Stewart Stadium; Ogden, UT	W 43–40 ^{4OT}	4,383	
November 10	at No. 1 Montana	Washington–Grizzly Stadium; Missoula, MT	L 23–38	17,062	
November 17	at Utah State*	Romney Stadium; Logan, UT	L 43–56	16,434	
*Non-conference game; Rankings from The Sports Network Poll released prior to the game
