= 2001 Montana State Bobcats football team =

American college football season

2001 Montana State Bobcats football
- Conference: Big Sky Conference
- Record: 5–6 (4–3 Big Sky)
- Head coach: Mike Kramer (2nd season)
- Defensive coordinator: Pete Kwiatkowski (2nd season)
- Home stadium: Bobcat Stadium

2001 Big Sky Conference football standings
	Conf.			Overall
Team	W		L	W		L
No. 1 Montana $^	7	–	0	15	–	1
No. 16 Northern Arizona ^	5	–	2	9	–	4
Portland State	5	–	2	7	–	4
Montana State	4	–	3	5	–	6
Eastern Washington	3	–	4	7	–	4
Weber State	2	–	5	3	–	8
Idaho State	1	–	6	4	–	7
Sacramento State	1	–	6	2	–	9
$ – Conference champion; ^ – NCAA Division I-AA playoff participant; Rankings from The Sports Network poll

The 2001 Montana State Bobcats football team was an American football team that represented Montana State University in the Big Sky Conference during the 2001 NCAA Division I-AA football season. In their second season under head coach Mike Kramer, the Bobcats compiled a 5–6 record (4–3 against Big Sky opponents) and finished in fourth place out of eight teams in the Big Sky. The Bobcats dropped their 16th consecutive game in the Montana–Montana State football rivalry.

== Schedule ==
Date	Opponent	Site	Result	Attendance	Source
August 30	at UAB*	Legion Field; Birmingham, AL	L 13–41	20,000	
September 8	at Weber State	Stewart Stadium; Ogden, UT	W 32–17		
September 15	at Oregon State*	Reser Stadium; Corvallis, OR	Canceled		
September 22	Cal Poly*	Bobcat Stadium; Bozeman, MT	L 6–34		
September 29	Cal State Northridge*	Bobcat Stadium; Bozeman, MT	W 34–27	8,407	
October 6	at No. 16 Eastern Washington	Joe Albi Stadium; Spokane, WA	W 48–38	7,027	
October 13	Sacramento State^{†}	Bobcat Stadium; Bozeman, MT	W 20–0	11,817	
October 18	at No. 19 (I-A) Washington State*	Martin Stadium; Pullman, WA	L 28–53	14,325	
October 27	No. 21 Northern Arizona	Bobcat Stadium; Bozeman, MT	L 28–35	10,857	
November 3	at Portland State	PGE Park; Portland, OR	L 21–33	4,244	
November 10	Idaho State	Bobcat Stadium; Bozeman, MT	W 52–13	8,607	
November 17	No. 1 Montana	Bobcat Stadium; Bozeman, MT (rivalry)	L 27–38	15,238	
*Non-conference game; ^{†}Homecoming; Rankings from The Sports Network Poll released prior to the game
