= 2001 Humboldt State Lumberjacks football team =

American college football season

2001 Humboldt State Lumberjacks football
- Conference: Great Northwest Athletic Conference
- Record: 4–7 (1–2 GNAC)
- Head coach: Doug Adkins (2nd season)
- Home stadium: Redwood Bowl

2001 Great Northwest Athletic Conference football standings
	Conf.			Overall
Team	W		L	W		L
No. 23 Western Washington $	3	–	0	8	–	3
Western Oregon	1	–	2	4	–	5
Humboldt State	1	–	2	4	–	7
Central Washington	1	–	2	4	–	7
$ – Conference champion; First Humboldt State vs. Western Oregon game (Oct. 13) did not count as a conference game; Rankings from AFCA poll

The 2001 Humboldt State Lumberjacks football team represented Humboldt State University—now known as California State Polytechnic University, Humboldt—as a member of the Great Northwest Athletic Conference (GNAC) during the 2001 NCAA Division II football season. Led second-year head coach Doug Adkins, the Lumberjacks compiled an overall record of 4–7 with a mark of 1–2 in conference play, placing in a three-way tie for second in the GNAC. The team was outscored its by opponents 405 to 267 for the season. Humboldt State played home games at the Redwood Bowl in Arcata, California.

Humboldt State has been a member of the Columbia Football Association (CFA) from 1997 to 2000. The CFA folded after the 2000 season. Because of the September 11 attacks, many college football games were rescheduled. As a result, a hole in the Lumberjacks schedule was created. To fill that, a game was added against conference foe Western Oregon was added on October 13, but it did not count as a conference game.

== Schedule ==
Date	Opponent	Site	Result
September 1	Montana Tech*	Redwood Bowl; Arcata, CA	W 35–34
September 8	at Saint Mary's*	Saint Mary’s Stadium; Moraga, CA	L 10–49
September 15	Menlo*	Redwood Bowl; Arcata, CA	L 29–36
September 22	at Rocky Mountain*	Herb Klindt Field; Billings, MT	L 28–31
September 29	No. 3 UC Davis*	Redwood Bowl; Arcata, CA	L 14–56
October 6	Azusa Pacific*	Redwood Bowl; Arcata, CA	W 31–28
October 13	at Western Oregon*	McArthur Field; Monmouth, OR	W 34–31
October 20	Western Washington	Redwood Bowl; Arcata, CA	L 7–41
October 27	at Central Washington	Tomlinson Stadium; Ellensburg, WA	L 21–40
November 3	at Simon Fraser*	Thunderbird Stadium; University Endowment Lands, BC	L 34–37
November 10	Western Oregon	Redwood Bowl; Arcata, CA	W 24–22
*Non-conference game; Rankings from AFCA Poll released prior to the game
