= 2001 James Madison Dukes football team =

American college football season

2001 James Madison Dukes football
- Conference: Atlantic 10 Conference
- Record: 2–9 (0–9 A-10)
- Head coach: Mickey Matthews (3rd season)
- Defensive coordinator: Dick Hopkins (3rd season)
- Home stadium: Bridgeforth Stadium

2001 Atlantic 10 Conference football standings
	Conf.			Overall
Team	W		L	W		L
No. 11 Hofstra +^	7	–	2	9	–	3
No. 10 Maine +^	7	–	2	9	–	3
No. 20 Villanova +	7	–	2	8	–	3
No. 17 William & Mary +^	7	–	2	8	–	4
No. 21 Rhode Island	6	–	3	8	–	3
Delaware	4	–	5	4	–	6
Northeastern	4	–	5	5	–	6
UMass	3	–	6	3	–	8
Richmond	3	–	6	3	–	8
New Hampshire	2	–	7	4	–	7
James Madison	0	–	9	2	–	9
+ – Conference co-champions; ^ – NCAA Division I-AA playoff participant; Rankings from The Sports Network poll

The 2001 James Madison Dukes football team was an American football team that represented James Madison University during the 2001 NCAA Division I-AA football season as a member of the Atlantic 10 Conference. In their third year under head coach Mickey Matthews, the team compiled a 2–9 record.

== Schedule ==
Date	Opponent	Site	Result	Attendance	Source
September 1	Elon*	Bridgeforth Stadium; Harrisonburg, VA	W 42–21	10,500	
September 8	at New Hampshire	Cowell Stadium; Durham, NH	L 19–26	3,766	
September 15	Florida Atlantic*	Bridgeforth Stadium; Harrisonburg, VA	Canceled (Note: The Florida Atlantic game was initially postponed and later canceled in the aftermath of the September 11th attacks.)		
September 22	No. 12 Rhode Island	Bridgeforth Stadium; Harrisonburg, VA	L 12–16	10,200	
September 29	at Maine	Alfond Stadium; Orono, ME	L 3–13	8,011	
October 6	at No. 13 Villanova	Villanova Stadium; Villanova, PA	L 44–45 ^{OT}	11,761	
October 13	Richmond	Bridgeforth Stadium; Harrisonburg, VA (rivalry)	L 17–20	14,000	
October 20	at UMass	McGuirk Stadium; Hadley, MA	L 20–43	10,264	
November 3	Delaware	Bridgeforth Stadium; Harrisonburg, VA (rivalry)	L 3–28	10,000	
November 10	at William & Mary	Zable Stadium; Williamsburg, VA (rivalry)	L 10–17	9,233	
November 17	Northeastern	Bridgeforth Stadium; Harrisonburg, VA	L 17–24	8,000	
November 23	at Liberty*	Williams Stadium; Lynchburg, VA	W 14–7	2,647	
*Non-conference game; Rankings from The Sports Network Poll released prior to the game
