= 2001 Idaho State Bengals football team =

American college football season

2001 Idaho State Bengals football
- Conference: Big Sky Conference
- Record: 4–7 (1–6 Big Sky)
- Head coach: Larry Lewis (3rd season)
- Offensive coordinator: Bruce Barnum (1st season)
- Offensive scheme: Pro spread
- Defensive coordinator: James Ward (2nd season)
- Base defense: 4–3
- Home stadium: Holt Arena

2001 Big Sky Conference football standings
	Conf.			Overall
Team	W		L	W		L
No. 1 Montana $^	7	–	0	15	–	1
No. 16 Northern Arizona ^	5	–	2	9	–	4
Portland State	5	–	2	7	–	4
Montana State	4	–	3	5	–	6
Eastern Washington	3	–	4	7	–	4
Weber State	2	–	5	3	–	8
Idaho State	1	–	6	4	–	7
Sacramento State	1	–	6	2	–	9
$ – Conference champion; ^ – NCAA Division I-AA playoff participant; Rankings from The Sports Network poll

The 2001 Idaho State Bengals football team represented Idaho State University as a member of the Big Sky Conference during the 2001 NCAA Division I-AA football season. Led by third-year head coach Larry Lewis, the Bengals compiled an overall record of 4–7, with a mark of 1–6 in conference play, and finished tied for seventh in the Big Sky. The team played home games at Holt Arena in Pocatello, Idaho.

== Schedule ==
Date	Opponent	Site	Result	Attendance	Source
September 8	Montana Tech*	Holt Arena; Pocatello, ID	W 40–7		
September 22	at Sacramento State	Hornet Stadium; Sacramento, CA	L 27–33	8,887	
September 29	Montana State–Northern*	Holt Arena; Pocatello, ID	W 55–0		
October 6	at Northern Arizona	Walkup Skydome; Flagstaff, AZ	L 26–51	10,810	
October 13	Portland State	Holt Arena; Pocatello, ID	W 23–17	7,979	
October 20	at Utah State*	Romney Stadium; Logan, UT	L 27–28	20,875	
October 27	at Weber State	Stewart Stadium; Ogden, UT	L 17–42	4,195	
November 3	No. 1 Montana	Holt Arena; Pocatello, ID	L 28–32	9,242	
November 10	at Montana State	Bobcat Stadium; Bozeman, MT	L 13–52	8,607	
November 17	Southern Utah*	Holt Arena; Pocatello, ID	W 30–23		
November 24	Eastern Washington	Holt Arena; Pocatello, ID	L 45–48	7,979	
*Non-conference game; Rankings from The Sports Network Poll released prior to the game
