= 2001 Delaware Fightin' Blue Hens football team =

American college football season

2001 Delaware Fightin' Blue Hens football
- Conference: Atlantic 10 Conference
- Record: 4–6 (4–5 A-10)
- Head coach: Tubby Raymond (36th season)
- Offensive coordinator: Ted Kempski (34th season)
- Offensive scheme: Delaware Wing-T
- Defensive coordinator: Bob Sabol (11th season)
- Base defense: 4–3
- Home stadium: Delaware Stadium

2001 Atlantic 10 Conference football standings
	Conf.			Overall
Team	W		L	W		L
No. 11 Hofstra +^	7	–	2	9	–	3
No. 10 Maine +^	7	–	2	9	–	3
No. 20 Villanova +	7	–	2	8	–	3
No. 17 William & Mary +^	7	–	2	8	–	4
No. 21 Rhode Island	6	–	3	8	–	3
Delaware	4	–	5	4	–	6
Northeastern	4	–	5	5	–	6
UMass	3	–	6	3	–	8
Richmond	3	–	6	3	–	8
New Hampshire	2	–	7	4	–	7
James Madison	0	–	9	2	–	9
+ – Conference co-champions; ^ – NCAA Division I-AA playoff participant; Rankings from The Sports Network poll

The 2001 Delaware Fightin' Blue Hens football team represented the University of Delaware as a member of the Atlantic 10 Conference (A-10) during the 2001 NCAA Division I-AA football season. Led by Tubby Raymond in his 36th and final season as head coach, the Fightin' Blue Hens compiled an overall record of 4–6 with a mark of 4–5 in conference play, tying for sixth place in the A-10. The team played home games at Delaware Stadium in Newark, Delaware.

The game scheduled against West Chester on September 15 was cancelled after the September 11 attacks. Raymond retired following the season, ending his career with 300 wins, and was succeeded by K. C. Keeler.

== Schedule ==
Date	Time	Opponent	Rank	Site	TV	Result	Attendance	Source
August 30	7:00 pm	Rhode Island	No. 4	Delaware Stadium; Newark, DE		L 7–10	20,794	
September 8	12:00 pm	at No. 1 Georgia Southern*	No. 15	Paulson Stadium; Statesboro, GA		L 7–38	16,105	
September 15	7:00 pm	West Chester*	No. 23	Delaware Stadium; Newark, DE (rivalry)		Cancelled		
September 22	7:00 pm	UMass	No. 23	Delaware Stadium; Newark, DE	CN8	W 35–7	20,372	
September 29	1:00 pm	at Northeastern	No. 24	Parsons Field; Brookline, MA		L 7–20	3,389	
October 6	1:00 pm	at New Hampshire		Cowell Stadium; Durham, NH		W 49–36	5,584	
October 13	12:00 pm	No. 9 Hofstra^{†}		Delaware Stadium; Newark, DE		L 14–39	20,866	
October 20	1:00 pm	William & Mary		Delaware Stadium; Newark, DE (rivalry)		L 17–21	21,563	
November 3	12:00 pm	at James Madison		Bridgeforth Stadium; Harrisonburg, VA (rivalry)		W 28–3	10,000	
November 10	1:00 pm	Richmond		Delaware Stadium; Newark, DE		W 10–6	18,923	
November 17	1:00 pm	at No. 17 Villanova		Villanova Stadium; Villanova, PA (Battle of the Blue)		L 14–19	11,829	
*Non-conference game; ^{†}Homecoming; Rankings from The Sports Network Poll released prior to the game; All times are in Eastern time
