= 2001 New Hampshire Wildcats football team =

American college football season

2001 New Hampshire Wildcats football
- Conference: Atlantic 10 Conference
- Record: 4–7 (2–7 A-10)
- Head coach: Sean McDonnell (3rd season)
- Offensive coordinator: Chip Kelly (3rd season)
- Home stadium: Cowell Stadium

2001 Atlantic 10 Conference football standings
	Conf.			Overall
Team	W		L	W		L
No. 11 Hofstra +^	7	–	2	9	–	3
No. 10 Maine +^	7	–	2	9	–	3
No. 20 Villanova +	7	–	2	8	–	3
No. 17 William & Mary +^	7	–	2	8	–	4
No. 21 Rhode Island	6	–	3	8	–	3
Delaware	4	–	5	4	–	6
Northeastern	4	–	5	5	–	6
UMass	3	–	6	3	–	8
Richmond	3	–	6	3	–	8
New Hampshire	2	–	7	4	–	7
James Madison	0	–	9	2	–	9
+ – Conference co-champions; ^ – NCAA Division I-AA playoff participant; Rankings from The Sports Network poll

The 2001 New Hampshire Wildcats football team was an American football team that represented the University of New Hampshire as a member of the Atlantic 10 Conference during the 2001 NCAA Division I-AA football season. In its third year under head coach Sean McDonnell, the team compiled a 4–7 record (2–7 against conference opponents) and finished tenth out of eleven teams in the Atlantic 10 Conference.

== Schedule ==
Date	Opponent	Rank	Site	Result	Attendance	Source
September 1	Hampton*		Cowell Stadium; Durham, NH	W 45–29	4,682	
September 8	James Madison		Cowell Stadium; Durham, NH	W 26–19	3,766	
September 22	at Dartmouth*	No. 21	Memorial Field; Hanover, NH (rivalry)	W 42–38	6,922	
September 29	at No. 22 William & Mary	No. 20	Zable Stadium; Williamsburg, VA	L 28–38	9,525	
October 6	Delaware		Cowell Stadium; Durham, NH	L 36–49	5,584	
October 13	at UMass		McGuirk Stadium; Hadley, MA (rivalry)	W 35–24	10,117	
October 20	at No. 4 Rhode Island		Meade Stadium; Kingston, RI	L 27–31	5,687	
October 27	at No. 5 Hofstra		James M. Shuart Stadium; Hempstead, NY	L 20–35	2,177	
November 3	Villanova		Cowell Stadium; Durham, NH	L 35–38		
November 10	at Northeastern		Parsons Field; Brookline, MA	L 11–34		
November 17	No. 18 Maine		Cowell Stadium; Durham, NH (Battle for the Brice–Cowell Musket)	L 24–57	3,341	
*Non-conference game; Rankings from The Sports Network Poll released prior to the game
