= 2001 NCAA Division II football season =

American college football season

- Regular season: August 30 – November 10, 2001
- Playoffs: November 17 – December 8, 2001
- National Championship: Braly Municipal Stadium; Florence, AL
- Champion: North Dakota
- Harlon Hill Trophy: Dusty Bonner, Valdosta State

The 2001 NCAA Division II football season, part of college football in the United States organized by the National Collegiate Athletic Association at the Division II level, began on August 30, 2001, and concluded with the NCAA Division II Football Championship on December 8, 2001 at Braly Municipal Stadium in Florence, Alabama, hosted by the University of North Alabama.

North Dakota defeated Grand Valley State in the championship game, 17–14, to win their first Division II national title.

The Harlon Hill Trophy was awarded to Dusty Bonner, quarterback from Valdosta State, his second consecutive Hill Trophy.

== Conference and program changes ==
- The Northeast-10 Conference began sponsorship of football this season with 10 member teams from the Northeast.
- The Great Northwest Athletic Conference began its first sponsorship of football during the 2001 season (it was disbanded in 2006 and re-formed again in 2008).

School	2000 Conference	2001 Conference
American International	Eastern Football Conference	Northeast 10
Assumption	Eastern Football Conference	Northeast 10
Bentley	Eastern Football Conference	Northeast 10
Bryant	Eastern Football Conference	Northeast 10
Central Washington	Columbia Football Association (NAIA)	GNAC
C.W. Post	Eastern Football Conference	Northeast 10
Humboldt State	Columbia Football Association (NAIA)	GNAC
Lincoln (MO)	Central States Football League (NAIA)	D-II Independent
Pace	Eastern Football Conference	Northeast 10
Saint Anselm	Eastern Football Conference	Northeast 10
Southern Connecticut	Eastern Football Conference	Northeast 10
Stonehill	Eastern Football Conference	Northeast 10
UMass Lowell	Eastern Football Conference	Northeast 10
Western Oregon	Columbia Football Association (NAIA)	GNAC
Western Washington	Columbia Football Association (NAIA)	GNAC

== Conference standings ==
2001 Central Intercollegiate Athletic Association football standings
	Conf.			Overall
Team	W		L	W		L
Eastern
Virginia Union xy	5	–	1	8	–	2
Bowie State	4	–	2	7	–	3
Virginia State	2	–	4	3	–	6
Elizabeth City State	0	–	6	2	–	8
Western
Winston-Salem State xy$	5	–	1	9	–	3
Fayetteville State	4	–	2	6	–	4
North Carolina Central	3	–	3	5	–	4
Johnson C. Smith	1	–	5	2	–	7
Livingstone	0	–	6	1	–	8
Championship: Virginia Union 31, Winston-Salem State 24
$ – Conference champion; x – Division champion/co-champions; y – Championship game participant

2001 Great Lakes Intercollegiate Athletic Conference football standings
	Conf.			Overall
Team	W		L	W		L
No. 2 Grand Valley State $^	9	–	0	13	–	1
No. 9 Saginaw Valley State ^	9	–	1	11	–	2
Ferris State	7	–	3	7	–	4
Indianapolis	6	–	4	7	–	4
Ashland	5	–	5	6	–	5
Michigan Tech	5	–	5	5	–	5
Northern Michigan	3	–	7	4	–	7
Northwood	3	–	6	3	–	6
Wayne State (MI)	3	–	6	3	–	7
Findlay	3	–	7	3	–	8
Hillsdale	3	–	7	3	–	8
Mercyhurst	2	–	7	2	–	7
$ – Conference champion; ^ – NCAA Division II playoff participant; Rankings from AFCA poll

2001 Great Northwest Athletic Conference football standings
	Conf.			Overall
Team	W		L	W		L
No. 23 Western Washington $	3	–	0	8	–	3
Western Oregon	1	–	2	4	–	5
Humboldt State	1	–	2	4	–	7
Central Washington	1	–	2	4	–	7
$ – Conference champion; First Humboldt State vs. Western Oregon game (Oct. 13) did not count as a conference game; Rankings from AFCA Poll

2001 Gulf South Conference football standings
	Conf.			Overall
Team	W		L	W		L
No. 1 Valdosta State $^	9	–	0	12	–	1
No. 16 Arkansas Tech	7	–	2	8	–	2
No. 14 Central Arkansas ^	7	–	2	9	–	3
No. 25 West Georgia	6	–	3	8	–	3
Delta State	6	–	3	7	–	3
Southern Arkansas	5	–	4	5	–	5
Arkansas–Monticello	4	–	5	5	–	6
Harding	4	–	5	4	–	6
North Alabama	3	–	6	4	–	6
Ouachita Baptist	2	–	7	3	–	7
Henderson State	1	–	8	1	–	10
West Alabama	0	–	9	1	–	10
$ – Conference champion; ^ – NCAA Division II playoff participant; Rankings from AFCA poll

2001 Lone Star Conference football standings*
	Conf.			Overall
Team	W		L	W		L
Overall
No. 17 Tarleton State	8	–	1	9	–	2
No. 11 Texas A&M–Kingsville	8	–	1	9	–	1
Angelo State	6	–	2	6	–	4
East Central	6	–	3	6	–	4
Midwestern State	6	–	3	7	–	4
Texas A&M–Commerce	5	–	4	7	–	4
Eastern New Mexico	4	–	4	6	–	4
Northeastern State	4	–	4	5	–	5
Abilene Christian	3	–	6	3	–	8
SE Oklahoma State	2	–	6	3	–	7
SW Oklahoma State	2	–	6	4	–	6
Central Oklahoma	1	–	7	3	–	8
West Texas A&M	0	–	8	2	–	9
North
Midwestern State	4	–	1	7	–	4
East Central	3	–	2	6	–	4
Northeastern State	3	–	2	5	–	5
SE Oklahoma State	2	–	3	3	–	7
SW Oklahoma State	2	–	3	4	–	6
Central Oklahoma	1	–	4	3	–	8
South
No. 17 Tarleton State	5	–	1	9	–	2
No. 11 Texas A&M–Kingsville	5	–	1	9	–	1
Angelo State	4	–	2	6	–	4
Texas A&M–Commerce	3	–	3	7	–	4
Eastern New Mexico	2	–	4	6	–	4
Abilene Christian	2	–	4	3	–	8
West Texas A&M	0	–	6	2	–	9
$ – Conference champion; ^ – NCAA Division II playoff participant; * – The LSC counted separate overall and division standings.; Rankings from AFCA poll

2001 Mid-America Intercollegiate Athletics Association football standings
	Conf.			Overall
Team	W		L	W		L
No. 6 Pittsburg State $^	8	–	1	11	–	2
No. 20 Central Missouri State	7	–	2	10	–	2
Truman	6	–	3	8	–	3
Missouri Western	6	–	3	8	–	3
NW Missouri State	6	–	3	7	–	4
Southwest Baptist	4	–	5	6	–	5
Emporia State	3	–	6	5	–	6
Missouri Southern	3	–	6	4	–	6
Washburn	2	–	7	3	–	8
Missouri–Rolla	0	–	9	2	–	9
$ – Conference champion; ^ – NCAA Division II playoff participant; Rankings from AFCA poll

2001 North Central Conference football standings
	Conf.			Overall
Team	W		L	W		L
No. 4 North Dakota $^	7	–	1	14	–	1
No. 15 Nebraska–Omaha ^	6	–	2	8	–	3
No. 22 North Dakota State	5	–	3	7	–	3
Northern Colorado	4	–	4	7	–	4
South Dakota State	4	–	4	5	–	6
Augustana (SD)	3	–	5	5	–	5
Minnesota State	3	–	5	4	–	7
St. Cloud State	3	–	5	4	–	7
South Dakota	1	–	7	2	–	8
$ – Conference champion; ^ – NCAA Division II playoff participant; Rankings from AFCA Poll

2001 Northeast-10 Conference football standings
	Conf.			Overall
Team	W		L	W		L
No. 19 C. W. Post y$	9	–	1	11	–	1
Bentley y	8	–	2	9	–	3
American International	8	–	2	8	–	2
Merrimack	6	–	4	6	–	4
Southern Connecticut	6	–	4	6	–	4
Saint Anselm	5	–	5	5	–	5
Bryant	4	–	5	4	–	5
Pace	4	–	5	4	–	5
Stonehill	3	–	7	4	–	7
UMass Lowell	1	–	9	1	–	9
Assumption	0	–	10	1	–	10
Championship: C. W. Post 43, Bentley 6
$ – Conference champion; y – Championship game participant; Rankings from AFCA poll

2001 Northern Sun Intercollegiate Conference football standings
	Conf.			Overall
Team	W		L	W		L
No. 13 Winona State $^	9	–	0	10	–	2
No. 24 Minnesota Duluth	7	–	2	9	–	3
Concordia–St. Paul	6	–	3	8	–	3
Bemidji State	5	–	4	7	–	4
Minnesota State–Moorhead	4	–	5	4	–	6
Minnesota–Crookston	4	–	5	4	–	7
Northern State	4	–	5	4	–	7
Wayne State (NE)	3	–	6	4	–	7
Southwest State (MN)	3	–	6	3	–	8
Minnesota Morris	0	–	9	0	–	11
$ – Conference champion; ^ – NCAA Division II playoff participant; Rankings from AFCA Poll

2001 Pennsylvania State Athletic Conference football standings
	Conf.			Overall
Team	W		L	W		L
East Division
No. 5 Bloomsburg x^	6	–	0	9	–	2
East Stroudsburg	5	–	1	7	–	3
Kutztown	4	–	2	6	–	4
West Chester	3	–	3	5	–	4
Millersville	2	–	4	3	–	8
Mansfield	1	–	5	2	–	8
Cheyney	0	–	6	0	–	10
West Division
No. 8 IUP x^	6	–	0	8	–	2
Shippensburg	5	–	1	8	–	3
Slippery Rock	3	–	3	6	–	4
Edinboro	3	–	3	4	–	6
Clarion	2	–	4	4	–	7
California (PA)	1	–	5	5	–	5
Lock Haven	1	–	5	3	–	8
x – Division champion/co-champions; ^ – NCAA Division II playoff participant; Rankings from AFCA poll

2001 Rocky Mountain Athletic Conference football standings
	Conf.			Overall
Team	W		L	W		L
Chadron State $^	8	–	0	10	–	1
Nebraska–Kearney	7	–	1	8	–	2
Mesa State	5	–	3	7	–	4
Western State (CO)	5	–	3	6	–	5
Colorado Mines	4	–	4	7	–	4
New Mexico Highlands	3	–	5	4	–	7
Fort Hays State	2	–	6	3	–	8
Adams State	1	–	7	2	–	9
Fort Lewis	1	–	7	2	–	9
$ – Conference champion; ^ – NCAA Division II playoff participant

2001 South Atlantic Conference football standings
	Conf.			Overall
Team	W		L	W		L
No. 7 Catawba $^	6	–	1	11	–	2
No. 18 Tusculum	5	–	3	8	–	2
Carson–Newman	5	–	2	6	–	3
Presbyterian	5	–	2	7	–	4
Mars Hill	4	–	3	7	–	4
Lenoir–Rhyne	2	–	5	2	–	7
Wingate	1	–	6	4	–	7
Newberry	0	–	7	4	–	7
$ – Conference champion; ^ – NCAA Division II playoff participant; Rankings from AFCA poll

2001 Southern Intercollegiate Athletic Conference football standings
	Conf.			Overall
Team	W		L	W		L
No. 10 Tuskegee +	6	–	1	11	–	1
Morehouse +	6	–	1	8	–	2
No. 21 Fort Valley State +	6	–	1	8	–	3
Albany State	3	–	4	4	–	6
Miles	3	–	4	4	–	7
Kentucky State	2	–	5	3	–	8
Lane	1	–	6	3	–	7
Clark Atlanta	1	–	6	1	–	10
+ – Conference co-champions; Rankings from AFCA Poll

2001 West Virginia Intercollegiate Athletic Conference football standings
	Conf.			Overall
Team	W		L	W		L
Glenville State $	6	–	1	6	–	3
Shepherd	5	–	2	8	–	2
Fairmont State	5	–	2	6	–	3
West Virginia Tech	4	–	3	5	–	6
West Liberty State	3	–	4	5	–	5
West Virginia Wesleyan	3	–	4	3	–	6
West Virginia State	2	–	5	4	–	7
Concord	0	–	7	1	–	9
$ – Conference champion

2001 NCAA Division II independents football records
	Conf.			Overall
Team	W		L	W		L
No. 12 UC Davis ^		–		10	–	3
Gannon		–		5	–	4
New Haven		–		5	–	4
Western New Mexico		–		3	–	7
Quincy		–		2	–	8
Saint Joseph's (IN)		–		2	–	8
Kentucky Wesleyan		–		1	–	9
Oklahoma Panhandle State		–		0	–	10
^ – NCAA Division II playoff participant; Rankings from AFCA poll

== Conference summaries ==
Conference Champions

Central Intercollegiate Athletic Association – Virginia Union
Great Lakes Intercollegiate Athletic Conference – Grand Valley State
Great Northwest Athletic Conference – Western Washington
Gulf South Conference – Valdosta State
Lone Star Conference – Tarleton State and Texas A&M–Kingsville
Mid-America Intercollegiate Athletics Association – Pittsburg State
North Central Conference – North Dakota
Northeast-10 Conference – C.W. Post
Northern Sun Intercollegiate Conference – Winona State
Pennsylvania State Athletic Conference – Bloomsburg (East), Indiana (PA) (West)
Rocky Mountain Athletic Conference – Chadron State
South Atlantic Conference – Catawba
Southern Intercollegiate Athletic Conference – Fort Valley State, Morehouse and Tuskegee
West Virginia Intercollegiate Athletic Conference – Glenville State

== Postseason ==
2001 NCAA Division II Football Championship
- Teams: 16
- Finals Site: Braly Municipal Stadium; Florence, AL
- Champion: North Dakota; (1st title, title game)
- Runner-up: Grand Valley State; (1st title game)
- Semifinalists: Catawba; UC Davis
- Winning coach: championship

The 2001 NCAA Division II Football Championship playoffs were the 28th single-elimination tournament to determine the national champion of men's NCAA Division II college football. The championship game was held at Braly Municipal Stadium in Florence, Alabama for the 15th time.

=== Playoff bracket ===
First round Campus sites
North Dakota	42
Winona State	28
Pittsburg State	20
Nebraska–Omaha	7
Tarleton State	28
Chadron State	24
UC Davis	37
Texas A&M–Kingsville	32
Valdosta State	40
Fort Valley State	24
Catawba	35
Central Arkansas	34
Grand Valley State	42
Bloomsburg	14
Saginaw Valley State	33
IUP	32

Quarterfinals; Campus sites
North Dakota	38
Pittsburg State	0
Tarleton State	25
UC Davis	42
Valdosta State	34
Catawba	37*
Grand Valley State	33
Saginaw Valley State	30

Semifinals; Campus sites
North Dakota	14
UC Davis	2
Catawba	16
Grand Valley State	34

Championship; Braly Municipal Stadium; Florence, AL
North Dakota	17
Grand Valley State	14

== See also ==
- 2001 NCAA Division I-A football season
- 2001 NCAA Division I-AA football season
- 2001 NCAA Division III football season
- 2001 NAIA football season
