= 2001 Sam Houston State Bearkats football team =

American college football season

2001 Sam Houston State Bearkats football

Southland co-champion

NCAA Division I-AA Quarterfinal, L 24–49 at Montana
- Conference: Southland Football League

Ranking
- Sports Network: No. 7
- Record: 10–3 (5–1 Southland)
- Head coach: Ron Randleman (20th season)
- Defensive coordinator: Mike Lucas (12th season)
- Home stadium: Bowers Stadium

2001 Southland Football League standings
	Conf.			Overall
Team	W		L	W		L
No. 7 Sam Houston State +^	5	–	1	10	–	3
No. 13 McNeese State +^	5	–	1	8	–	4
No. 14 Northwestern State ^	4	–	2	8	–	4
Stephen F. Austin	4	–	2	6	–	5
Jacksonville State	2	–	4	5	–	6
Nicholls State	1	–	5	3	–	8
Southwest Texas State	0	–	6	4	–	7
+ – Conference co-champions; ^ – NCAA Division I-AA playoff participant; Rankings from The Sports Network poll

The 2001 Sam Houston State Bearkats football team represented Sam Houston State University as a member of the Southland Football League during the 2001 NCAA Division I-AA football season. Led by 20th-year head coach Ron Randleman, the Bearkats compiled an overall record of 10–3 with a mark of 5–1 in conference play, sharing the Southland title with McNeese State. Sam Houston State advanced to the NCAA Division I-AA Football Championship playoffs, where they beat Northern Arizona in the first round before losing to the eventual national champion, Montana, in the quarterfinals. The 2001 Bearkats offense scored 470 points while the defense allowed 322 points. Members of the 2001 Bearkats team that went on to play in the National Football League (NFL) include Keith Davis, Keith Heinrich, and Josh McCown.

== Schedule ==
Date	Opponent	Rank	Site	Result	Attendance	Source
September 1	at Louisiana–Monroe*		Malone Stadium; Monroe, LA	W 20–9	6,742	
September 8	Tarleton State*		Bowers Stadium; Huntsville, TX	W 61–10		
September 22	at Northern Illinois*		Huskie Stadium; DeKalb, IL	L 16–41	12,463	
September 29	at Mississippi Valley State*		Rice–Totten Stadium; Itta Bena, MS	W 68–13		
October 6	No. 15 Northwestern State	No. 25	Bowers Stadium; Huntsville, TX	W 30–14		
October 13	at Nicholls State	No. 19	John L. Guidry Stadium; Thibodaux, LA	W 35–32		
October 18	No. 19 Stephen F. Austin	No. 15	Bowers Stadium; Huntsville, TX (rivalry)	W 24–21		
October 27	at No. 17 McNeese State	No. 14	Cowboy Stadium; Lake Charles, LA	L 23–35	13,875	
November 3	Western Illinois*	No. 18	Bowers Stadium; Huntsville, TX	W 49–24	2,842	
November 10	Jacksonville State	No. 18	Bowers Stadium; Huntsville, TX	W 55–30	9,148	
November 17	at Southwest Texas State	No. 14	Bobcat Stadium; San Marcos, TX (rivalry)	W 31–13		
December 1	No. 15 Northern Arizona*	No. 13	Bowers Stadium; Huntsville, TX (NCAA Division I-A First Round)	W 34–31	8,134	
December 8	at No. 1 Montana*	No. 13	Washington–Grizzly Stadium; Missoula, MT (NCAA Division I-AA Quarterfinal)	L 24–49	18,125	
*Non-conference game; Rankings from The Sports Network Poll released prior to the game
