= 2001 McNeese State Cowboys football team =

American college football season

2001 McNeese State Cowboys football

Southland co-champion

NCAA Division I-AA First Round, L 10–14 vs. Maine
- Conference: Southland Conference

Ranking
- Sports Network: No. 10
- Record: 8–4 (5–1 Southland)
- Head coach: Tommy Tate (2nd season)
- Offensive coordinator: Matt Viator (2nd season)
- Defensive coordinator: Scott Stoker (2nd season)
- Home stadium: Cowboy Stadium

2001 Southland Football League standings
	Conf.			Overall
Team	W		L	W		L
No. 7 Sam Houston State +^	5	–	1	10	–	3
No. 13 McNeese State +^	5	–	1	8	–	4
No. 14 Northwestern State ^	4	–	2	8	–	4
Stephen F. Austin	4	–	2	6	–	5
Jacksonville State	2	–	4	5	–	6
Nicholls State	1	–	5	3	–	8
Southwest Texas State	0	–	6	4	–	7
+ – Conference co-champions; ^ – NCAA Division I-AA playoff participant; Rankings from The Sports Network poll

The 2001 McNeese State Cowboys football team was an American football team that represented McNeese State University as a member of the Southland Conference (Southland) during the 2001 NCAA Division I-AA football season. In their second year under head coach Tommy Tate, the team compiled an overall record of 8–4, with a mark of 5–1 in conference play, and finished as co-champion in the Southland. The Cowboys advanced to the NCAA Division I-AA Football Championship playoffs and lost to Maine in the first round.

== Schedule ==
Date	Opponent	Rank	Site	Result	Attendance	Source
September 1	at Texas A&M*	No. 8	Kyle Field; College Station, TX	L 24–38	70,656	
September 16	Prairie View A&M*	No. 7	Cowboy Stadium; Lake Charles, LA	W 56–0	13,151	
September 22	Alcorn State*	No. 5	Cowboy Stadium; Lake Charles, LA	W 54–14	14,529	
September 29	West Virginia Tech*	No. 5	Cowboy Stadium; Lake Charles, LA	W 51–9	12,871	
October 6	Stephen F. Austin	No. 4	Cowboy Stadium; Lake Charles, LA	L 14–26	15,054	
October 13	at No. 17 Southwest Texas State	No. 13	Bobcat Stadium; San Marcos, TX	W 24–3	11,617	
October 20	at No. 10 Western Kentucky*	No. 11	L. T. Smith Stadium; Bowling Green, KY	L 0–21	14,000	
October 27	No. 14 Sam Houston State	No. 17	Cowboy Stadium; Lake Charles, LA	W 35–23	13,875	
November 10	No. 12 Northwestern State	No. 13	Cowboy Stadium; Lake Charles, LA (rivalry)	W 17–10	16,200	
November 17	at Nicholls State	No. 11	John L. Guidry Stadium; Thibodaux, LA	W 34–27	4,107	
November 24	at Jacksonville State	No. 11	Paul Snow Stadium; Jacksonville, AL	W 31–21	7,842	
December 1	No. 16 Maine*	No. 10	Cowboy Stadium; Lake Charles, LA (NCAA Division I-AA First Round)	L 10–14	12,450	
*Non-conference game; Rankings from The Sports Network Poll released prior to the game
