= 2001 Eastern Washington Eagles football team =

American college football season

2001 Eastern Washington Eagles football
- Conference: Big Sky Conference
- Record: 7–4 (3–4 Big Sky)
- Head coach: Paul Wulff (2nd season)
- Offensive coordinator: Timm Rosenbach (1st season)
- Defensive coordinator: Steve Kizer (2nd season)
- Home stadium: Woodward Field; Joe Albi Stadium

2001 Big Sky Conference football standings
	Conf.			Overall
Team	W		L	W		L
No. 1 Montana $^	7	–	0	15	–	1
No. 16 Northern Arizona ^	5	–	2	9	–	4
Portland State	5	–	2	7	–	4
Montana State	4	–	3	5	–	6
Eastern Washington	3	–	4	7	–	4
Weber State	2	–	5	3	–	8
Idaho State	1	–	6	4	–	7
Sacramento State	1	–	6	2	–	9
$ – Conference champion; ^ – NCAA Division I-AA playoff participant; Rankings from The Sports Network poll

The 2001 Eastern Washington Eagles football team represented Eastern Washington University as a member of the Big Sky Conference during the 2001 NCAA Division I-AA football season. Led by second-year head coach Paul Wulff, the Eagles compiled an overall record of 7–4, with a mark of 3–4 in conference play, and finished fifth in the Big Sky. The team played home games at Woodward Field in Cheney and Joe Albi Stadium in Spokane, Washington.

== Schedule ==
Date	Opponent	Rank	Site	Result	Attendance	Source
September 8	at Connecticut*	No. 20	Memorial Stadium; Storrs, CT	W 35–17	15,723	
September 22	Weber State	No. 18	Woodward Field; Cheney, WA	W 50–26	5,132	
September 29	at No. 3 Montana	No. 15	Washington–Grizzly Stadium; Missoula, MT (EWU–UM Governors Cup)	L 26–29 ^{2OT}	19,198	
October 6	Montana State	No. 16	Joe Albi Stadium; Spokane, WA	L 38–48	7,027	
October 13	Simon Fraser*		Woodward Field; Cheney, WA	W 66–14	3,246	
October 20	at Sacramento State		Hornet Stadium; Sacramento, CA	W 42–35 ^{OT}	8,457	
October 27	Cal State Northridge*		Woodward Field; Cheney, WA	W 63–35	4,453	
November 3	at No. 17 Northern Arizona	No. 21	Walkup Skydome; Flagstaff, AZ	L 33–42	4,164	
November 10	Portland State		Woodward Field; Cheney, WA (rivalry)	L 22–37		
November 17	Central Washington*		Woodward Field; Cheney, WA	W 38–21		
November 24	at Idaho State		Holt Arena; Pocatello, ID	W 48–45	7,979	
*Non-conference game; Rankings from The Sports Network Poll released prior to the game
