= 2001 UMass Minutemen football team =

American college football season

2001 UMass Minutemen football
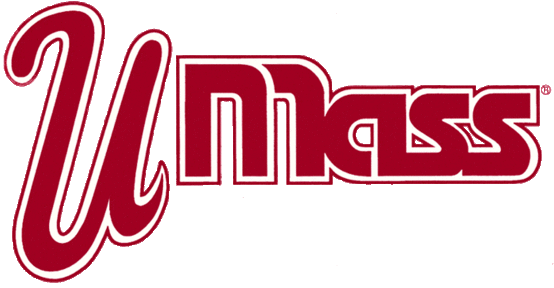
- Conference: Atlantic 10 Conference
- Record: 3–8 (3–6 A-10)
- Head coach: Mark Whipple (4th season)
- Offensive scheme: Pro-style
- Defensive coordinator: Neil McGrath (2nd season)
- Base defense: 4–3
- Home stadium: Warren McGuirk Alumni Stadium

2001 Atlantic 10 Conference football standings
	Conf.			Overall
Team	W		L	W		L
No. 11 Hofstra +^	7	–	2	9	–	3
No. 10 Maine +^	7	–	2	9	–	3
No. 20 Villanova +	7	–	2	8	–	3
No. 17 William & Mary +^	7	–	2	8	–	4
No. 21 Rhode Island	6	–	3	8	–	3
Delaware	4	–	5	4	–	6
Northeastern	4	–	5	5	–	6
UMass	3	–	6	3	–	8
Richmond	3	–	6	3	–	8
New Hampshire	2	–	7	4	–	7
James Madison	0	–	9	2	–	9
+ – Conference co-champions; ^ – NCAA Division I-AA playoff participant; Rankings from The Sports Network poll

The 2001 UMass Minutemen football team represented the University of Massachusetts Amherst in the 2001 NCAA Division I-AA football season as a member of the Atlantic 10 Conference. The team was coached by Mark Whipple and played its home games at Warren McGuirk Alumni Stadium in Hadley, Massachusetts. The 2001 season was a difficult one for the Minutemen, as they collected their first losing record since the 1997 season. UMass finished the season with a record of 3–8 overall and 3–6 in conference play.

== Schedule ==
Date	Time	Opponent	Rank	Site	TV	Result	Attendance	Source
September 1	1:00 p.m.	William & Mary	No. 21	McGuirk Stadium; Hadley, MA		L 10–31	8,243	
September 8	7:00 p.m.	at Marshall*		Marshall Stadium; Huntington, WV	Thundering Herd Network	L 20–49	27,533	
September 22	7:00 p.m.	at No. 23 Delaware		Delaware Stadium; Newark, DE	CN8	L 7–35	20,372	
September 29	6:00 p.m.	at No. 12 Hofstra*		Hofstra Stadium; Hempstead, NY	Fox Sports New York	L 6–36	2,995	
October 13	1:00 p.m.	New Hampshire^{†}		McGuirk Stadium; Hadley, MA (rivalry)		L 24–35	10,117	
October 20	1:00 p.m.	James Madison		McGuirk Stadium; Hadley, MA		W 43–20	10,264	
October 27	1:00 p.m.	at Villanova		Villanova Stadium; Villanova, PA		L 13–47	7,897	
November 3	12:00 p.m.	Northeastern		McGuirk Stadium; Hadley, MA		W 17–10	8,535	
November 10	12:00 p.m.	at No. 19 Maine		Alfond Stadium; Orono, ME		L 7–37	3,341	
November 17	12:00 p.m.	No. 14 Rhode Island		McGuirk Stadium; Hadley, MA	A10 TV	W 24–7	6,085	
November 23	12:00 p.m.	Richmond		McGuirk Stadium; Hadley, MA		L 7–35	3,582	
*Non-conference game; ^{†}Homecoming; Rankings from The Sports Network Poll released prior to the game; All times are in Eastern time
