= 2001 William & Mary Tribe football team =

American college football season

2001 William & Mary Tribe football

A-10 co-champion

NCAA Division I-AA First Round, L 27–40 at Appalachian State
- Conference: Atlantic 10 Conference

Ranking
- Sports Network: No. 17
- Record: 8–4 (7–2 A-10)
- Head coach: Jimmye Laycock (22nd season)
- Offensive coordinator: Zbig Kepa (9th season)
- Defensive coordinator: Tom Clark (1st season)
- Captains: Nick Gilliland; Marc Matthie; Mohammed Youssofi
- Home stadium: Zable Stadium

2001 Atlantic 10 Conference football standings
	Conf.			Overall
Team	W		L	W		L
No. 11 Hofstra +^	7	–	2	9	–	3
No. 10 Maine +^	7	–	2	9	–	3
No. 20 Villanova +	7	–	2	8	–	3
No. 17 William & Mary +^	7	–	2	8	–	4
No. 21 Rhode Island	6	–	3	8	–	3
Delaware	4	–	5	4	–	6
Northeastern	4	–	5	5	–	6
UMass	3	–	6	3	–	8
Richmond	3	–	6	3	–	8
New Hampshire	2	–	7	4	–	7
James Madison	0	–	9	2	–	9
+ – Conference co-champions; ^ – NCAA Division I-AA playoff participant; Rankings from The Sports Network poll

The 2001 William & Mary Tribe football team represented the College of William & Mary as member of the Atlantic 10 Conference (A-10) during the 2001 NCAA Division I-AA football season. Led by Jimmye Laycock in his 22nd year as head coach, William & Mary finished the season with an overall record of 8–4 and a mark of 7–2 in A-10 play, sharing the conference title with Hofstra, Maine, and Villanova. The Tribe was ranked No. 17 in the final Sports Network poll. They qualified for the NCAA Division I-AA playoffs, losing to Appalachian State in the first round.

== Schedule ==
Date	Time	Opponent	Rank	Site	TV	Result	Attendance	Source
September 1	1:00 pm	at No. 21 UMass		Warren McGuirk Alumni Stadium; Hadley, MA		W 31–10	8,243	
September 8	1:00 pm	at VMI*	No. 17	Foster Stadium; Lexington, VA (rivalry)		W 34–0	5,722	
September 22	3:00 pm	at East Carolina*		Dowdy–Ficklen Stadium; Greenville, NC		L 23–38	40,179	
September 29	1:00 pm	No. 20 New Hampshire	No. 22	Zable Stadium; Williamsburg, VA		W 38–28	9,525	
October 6	1:00 pm	No. 12 Hofstra*	No. 20	Zable Stadium; Williamsburg, VA		L 28–34	3,250	
October 13	12:00 pm	at No. 4 Rhode Island	No. 25	Meade Stadium; Kingston, RI		L 31–34	5,301	
October 20	1:00 pm	at Delaware		Delaware Stadium; Newark, DE (rivalry)		W 21–17	21,563	
October 27	12:00 pm	No. 18 Maine^{†}		Zable Stadium; Williamsburg, VA	CSN	W 42–20	9,359	
November 10	1:00 pm	James Madison		Zable Stadium; Williamsburg, VA (rivalry)		W 17–10	9,233	
November 17	1:00 pm	at Richmond	No. 25	University of Richmond Stadium; Richmond, VA (I-64 Bowl)		W 23–20	9,329	
November 24	1:00 pm	No. 15 Villanova	No. 20	Zable Stadium; Williamsburg, VA		W 47–44	4,236	
December 1	1:00 pm	at No. 8 Appalachian State*	No. 17	Kidd Brewer Stadium; Boone, NC (NCAA Division I-AA First Round)		L 27–40	5,279	
*Non-conference game; ^{†}Homecoming; Rankings from The Sports Network Poll released prior to the game; All times are in Eastern time
