= 2001 Rhode Island Rams football team =

American college football season

2001 Rhode Island Rams football
- Conference: Atlantic 10 Conference
- Record: 8–3 (6–3 A-10)
- Head coach: Tim Stowers (2nd season)
- Offensive coordinator: Harold Nichols (2nd season)
- Home stadium: Meade Stadium

2001 Atlantic 10 Conference football standings
	Conf.			Overall
Team	W		L	W		L
No. 11 Hofstra +^	7	–	2	9	–	3
No. 10 Maine +^	7	–	2	9	–	3
No. 20 Villanova +	7	–	2	8	–	3
No. 17 William & Mary +^	7	–	2	8	–	4
No. 21 Rhode Island	6	–	3	8	–	3
Delaware	4	–	5	4	–	6
Northeastern	4	–	5	5	–	6
UMass	3	–	6	3	–	8
Richmond	3	–	6	3	–	8
New Hampshire	2	–	7	4	–	7
James Madison	0	–	9	2	–	9
+ – Conference co-champions; ^ – NCAA Division I-AA playoff participant; Rankings from The Sports Network poll

The 2001 Rhode Island Rams football team was an American football team that represented the University of Rhode Island in the Atlantic 10 Conference during the 2001 NCAA Division I-AA football season. In their second season under head coach Tim Stowers, the Rams compiled an 8–3 record (6–3 against conference opponents) and finished fifth out of eleven teams in the conference.

== Schedule ==
Date	Opponent	Rank	Site	Result	Attendance	Source
August 30	at No. 4. Delaware		Delaware Stadium; Newark, DE	W 10–7	20,794	
September 8	No. 4. Hofstra	No. 19	Meade Stadium; Kingston, RI	W 35–26	4,309	
September 22	at James Madison	No. 12	Bridgeforth Stadium; Harrisonburg, VA	W 16–12	10,200	
September 29	at Brown*	No. 9	Brown Stadium; Providence, RI (rivalry)	W 42–38	9,365	
October 6	at Hampton*	No. 7	Armstrong Stadium; Hampton, VA	W 56–7	1,802	
October 13	No. 25 William & Mary	No. 4	Meade Stadium; Kingston, Ri	W 34–31	5,301	
October 20	New Hampshire^{†}	No. 4	Meade Stadium; Kingston, RI	W 31–27	5,687	
October 27	at Richmond	No. 4	University of Richmond Stadium; Richmond, VA	L 0–28	7,479	
November 3	No. 24 Maine	No. 8	Alfond Stadium; Orono, ME	L 14–26	5,803	
November 17	at UMass	No. 14	McGuirk Stadium; Hadley, MA	L 7–24	6,085	
November 24	Northeastern	No. 22	Meade Stadium; Kingston, RI	W 27–26	3,206	
*Non-conference game; ^{†}Homecoming; Rankings from The Sports Network Poll released prior to the game
