= 2001 Richmond Spiders football team =

American college football season

2001 Richmond Spiders football
- Conference: Atlantic 10 Conference
- Record: 3–8 (3–6 A-10)
- Head coach: Jim Reid (7th season)
- Home stadium: University of Richmond Stadium

2001 Atlantic 10 Conference football standings
	Conf.			Overall
Team	W		L	W		L
No. 11 Hofstra +^	7	–	2	9	–	3
No. 10 Maine +^	7	–	2	9	–	3
No. 20 Villanova +	7	–	2	8	–	3
No. 17 William & Mary +^	7	–	2	8	–	4
No. 21 Rhode Island	6	–	3	8	–	3
Delaware	4	–	5	4	–	6
Northeastern	4	–	5	5	–	6
UMass	3	–	6	3	–	8
Richmond	3	–	6	3	–	8
New Hampshire	2	–	7	4	–	7
James Madison	0	–	9	2	–	9
+ – Conference co-champions; ^ – NCAA Division I-AA playoff participant; Rankings from The Sports Network poll

The 2001 Richmond Spiders football team represented the University of Richmond during the 2001 NCAA Division I-AA football season. Richmond competed as a member of the Atlantic 10 Conference (A-10), and played their home games at the University of Richmond Stadium.

The Spiders were led by seventh-year head coach Jim Reid and finished the regular season with a 3–8 overall record and 3–6 record in conference play. The Spiders rush offense ranked eighth nationally, while its rush defense ranked seventh. Richmond's scoring defense finished 13th in the nation, while its total defense was ranked 11th.

== Schedule ==
Date	Time	Opponent	Site	Result	Attendance	Source
September 1	4:30 p.m.	at Virginia*	Scott Stadium; Charlottesville, VA	L 16–17	56,591	
September 22	7:00 p.m.	at Vanderbilt*	Vanderbilt Stadium; Nashville, TN	L 22–28	23,107	
September 29	3:00 p.m.	No. 14 Villanova	UR Stadium; Richmond, VA	L 30–31	12,200	
October 6	7:00 p.m.	at Maine	Alfond Stadium; Orono, ME	L 3–14	2,619	
October 13	1:30 p.m.	at James Madison	Bridgeforth Stadium; Harrisonburg, VA	W 20–17	14,000	
October 20	12:30 p.m.	at Northeastern	Parsons Field; Brookline, MA	L 0–7	2,130	
October 27	1:00 p.m.	No. 4 Rhode Island^{†}	UR Stadium; Richmond, VA	W 28–0	7,479	
November 3	noon	No. 5 Hofstra	UR Stadium; Richmond, VA	L 21–35	7,836	
November 10	1:00 p.m.	at Delaware	Delaware Stadium; Newark, DE	L 6–10	18,923	
November 17	3:00 p.m.	No. 25 William & Mary	UR Stadium; Richmond, VA (I-64 Bowl)	L 20–23	9,329	
November 23	noon	at UMass	McGuirk Stadium; Amherst, MA	W 35–7	3,582	
*Non-conference game; ^{†}Homecoming; Rankings from The Sports Network Poll released prior to the game; All times are in Eastern time
