= 2001 Hofstra Pride football team =

American college football season

2001 Hofstra Pride football

A-10 co-champion

NCAA Division I-AA First Round, L 24–27 at Lehigh
- Conference: Atlantic 10 Conference

Ranking
- Sports Network: No. 11
- Record: 9–3 (7–2 A-10)
- Head coach: Joe Gardi (12th season)
- Offensive coordinator: Dave Brock (2nd season)
- Defensive coordinator: Greg Gigantino (9th season)
- Captain: Charlie Adams
- Home stadium: James M. Shuart Stadium

2001 Atlantic 10 Conference football standings
	Conf.			Overall
Team	W		L	W		L
No. 11 Hofstra +^	7	–	2	9	–	3
No. 10 Maine +^	7	–	2	9	–	3
No. 20 Villanova +	7	–	2	8	–	3
No. 17 William & Mary +^	7	–	2	8	–	4
No. 21 Rhode Island	6	–	3	8	–	3
Delaware	4	–	5	4	–	6
Northeastern	4	–	5	5	–	6
UMass	3	–	6	3	–	8
Richmond	3	–	6	3	–	8
New Hampshire	2	–	7	4	–	7
James Madison	0	–	9	2	–	9
+ – Conference co-champions; ^ – NCAA Division I-AA playoff participant; Rankings from The Sports Network poll

The 2001 Hofstra Pride football team represented Hofstra University during the 2001 NCAA Division I-AA football season. It was the program's 61st season and they finished in a four-way tie as Atlantic 10 Conference (A-10) co-champions with Maine, Villanova, and William & Mary. Each team finished with identical 7–2 conference records. The Pride earned a berth into the 16-team Division I-AA playoffs, but lost in the opening round to Lehigh, 24–27, in overtime. Hofstra was led by 12th-year head coach Joe Gardi and their captain was Charlie Adams.

Redshirt senior quarterback Rocky Butler finished as a finalist for the Walter Payton Award, which is given annually to the most outstanding offensive player in Division I-AA (now known as Football Championship Subdivision), as chosen by a nationwide panel of media and college sports information directors.

== Schedule ==
Date	Time	Opponent	Rank	Site	TV	Result	Attendance	Source
September 1		Northeastern	No. 7	James M. Shuart Stadium; Hempstead, NY	Fox Sports NY	W 45–21	5,086	
September 8		at No. 19 Rhode Island	No. 4	Meade Stadium; Kingston, RI		L 26–35	4,309	
September 22	6:00 p.m.	Maine	No. 14	James M. Shuart Stadium; Hempstead, NY	MSG Network	W 51–44	3,109	
September 29	6:00 p.m.	UMass	No. 12	James M. Shuart Stadium; Hempstead, NY	Fox Sports NY	W 36–6	2,995	
October 6	1:00 p.m.	at No. 20 William & Mary	No. 12	Zable Stadium; Williamsburg, VA	Fox Sports NY	W 34–28	3,250	
October 13	12:00 p.m.	at Delaware	No. 9	Delaware Stadium; Newark, DE	Fox Sports NY	W 39–14	20,866	
October 20	12:00 p.m.	Elon*^{†}	No. 8	James M. Shuart Stadium; Hempstead, NY	MSG Network	W 42–21	6,271	
October 27	1:30 p.m.	New Hampshire	No. 7	James M. Shuart Stadium; Hempstead, NY	Fox Sports NY	W 35–20	2,177	
November 3	12:00 p.m.	at Richmond	No. 5	UR Stadium; Richmond, VA	MSG Network	W 35–21	7,836	
November 10	12:00 p.m.	at No. 23 Villanova	No. 3	James M. Shuart Stadium; Hempstead, NY	Metro TV	L 34–54	5,341	
November 17	1:30 p.m.	at Liberty*	No. 10	Williams Stadium; Lynchburg, VA	MSG Network	W 40–3	7,437	
December 1		at No. 5 Lehigh*	No. 9	Goodman Stadium; Bethlehem, PA (NCAA Division I-AA First Round)	Metro TV	L 24–27 ^{OT}	10,131	
*Non-conference game; ^{†}Homecoming; Rankings from The Sports Network Poll released prior to the game; All times are in Eastern time

== Awards and honors ==
- First Team All-America – Rocky Butler (Walter Camp, The Sports Network, Associated Press); Dan Zorger (Walter Camp, The Sports Network); Ryan Fletcher (Walter Camp, The Sports Network); Kahmal Roy (Walter Camp, Associated Press)
- Second Team All-America – Rocky Butler (The Football Gazette); Dan Zorger (Associated Press); Ryan Fletcher (Associated Press); Kahmal Roy (The Sports Network, The Football Gazette)
- Third Team All-America – Dan Zorger (The Football Gazette); Doug Shanahan (The Sports Network, Associated Press)
- Honorable Mention All-America – Ryan Fletcher (The Football Gazette); Doug Shanahan (The Football Gazette); Michael Brigandi (The Football Gazette)
- First Team All-Atlantic 10 – Rocky Butler, Dan Zorger, Kahmal Roy, Michael Brigandi, Ryan Fletcher, Doug Shanahan
- Second Team All-Atlantic 10 – Charlie Adams, Rich Holzer, Todd DeLamielleure
- Third Team All-Atlantic 10 – Trevor Dimmie
- First Team All-ECAC – Rocky Butler, Dan Zorger, Kahmal Roy
