= 2001 Northwestern State Demons football team =

American college football season

2001 Northwestern State Demons football

NCAA Division I-AA First Round, L 19–28 at Montana
- Conference: Southland Conference

Ranking
- Sports Network: No. 14
- Record: 8–4 (4–2 Southland)
- Head coach: Steve Roberts (2nd season)
- Offensive coordinator: Doug Ruse (4th season)
- Co-defensive coordinators: Kevin Coreless (3rd season); Jack Curtis (3rd season)
- Home stadium: Harry Turpin Stadium

2001 Southland Football League standings
	Conf.			Overall
Team	W		L	W		L
No. 7 Sam Houston State +^	5	–	1	10	–	3
No. 13 McNeese State +^	5	–	1	8	–	4
No. 14 Northwestern State ^	4	–	2	8	–	4
Stephen F. Austin	4	–	2	6	–	5
Jacksonville State	2	–	4	5	–	6
Nicholls State	1	–	5	3	–	8
Southwest Texas State	0	–	6	4	–	7
+ – Conference co-champions; ^ – NCAA Division I-AA playoff participant; Rankings from The Sports Network poll

The 2001 Northwestern State Demons football team represented Northwestern State University as a member of the Southland Conference during the 2001 NCAA Division I-AA football season. Led by second-year head coach Steve Roberts, the Demons compiled an overall record of 8–4 with a mark of 4–2 in conference play, tying in third place in Southland. Northwestern advanced to the Division I-AA playoffs, losing in the first round to the eventual national champion, Montana. Northwestern State played home games at Harry Turpin Stadium in Natchitoches, Louisiana.

== Schedule ==
Date	Time	Opponent	Rank	Site	TV	Result	Attendance	Source
September 1		at Southern*		A. W. Mumford Stadium; Baton Rouge, LA		W 30–21		
September 8		Henderson State*		Harry Turpin Stadium; Natchitoches, LA		W 55–17	13,029	
September 15		Gardner–Webb*	No. 24	Harry Turpin Stadium; Natchitoches, LA		Canceled	N/A	
September 22	6:05 pm	at TCU*	No. 24	Amon G. Carter Stadium; Fort Worth, TX		W 27–24 ^{OT}	30,409	
September 29	7:00 pm	at Oklahoma State*	No. 16	Lewis Field; Stillwater, OK		L 0–24	36,110	
October 6		at No. 25 Sam Houston State	No. 15	Bowers Stadium; Huntsville, TX		L 14–30		
October 13		at Elon*	No. 20	Rhodes Stadium; Elon, NC		W 24–6	2,850	
October 20		Nicholls State	No. 17	Harry Turpin Stadium; Natchitoches, LA (rivalry)		W 47–14		
October 27	2:00 pm	No. 22 Jacksonville State	No. 15	Harry Turpin Stadium; Natchitoches, LA		W 42–17	8,816	
November 3		Southwest Texas State	No. 12	Harry Turpin Stadium; Natchitoches, LA	TSAA	W 20–17		
November 10		at No. 13 McNeese State	No. 12	Cowboy Stadium; Lake Charles, LA (rivalry)	SCTN	L 10–17	16,200	
November 17	2:00 pm	No. 21 Stephen F. Austin	No. 16	Harry Turpin Stadium; Natchitoches, LA (rivalry)		W 31–17		
December 1	1:00 pm	at No. 1 Montana*	No. 14	Washington–Grizzly Stadium; Missoula, MT (NCAA Division I-AA First Round)	MTN	L 19–28	17,289	
*Non-conference game; Rankings from The Sports Network Poll released prior to the game; All times are in Central time
