= 2001 Maine Black Bears football team =

American college football season

2001 Maine Black Bears football

A-10 co-champion

NCAA Division I-AA Quarterfinal, L 28–56 at Northern Iowa
- Conference: Atlantic 10 Conference

Ranking
- Sports Network: No. 10
- Record: 9–3 (7–2 A-10)
- Head coach: Jack Cosgrove (9th season)
- Offensive coordinator: Bobby Wilder (2nd season)
- Defensive coordinator: Rich Nagy (1st season)
- Captains: Chad Hayes; Zack Magliaro; Malik Nichols
- Home stadium: Alfond Stadium

2001 Atlantic 10 Conference football standings
	Conf.			Overall
Team	W		L	W		L
No. 11 Hofstra +^	7	–	2	9	–	3
No. 10 Maine +^	7	–	2	9	–	3
No. 20 Villanova +	7	–	2	8	–	3
No. 17 William & Mary +^	7	–	2	8	–	4
No. 21 Rhode Island	6	–	3	8	–	3
Delaware	4	–	5	4	–	6
Northeastern	4	–	5	5	–	6
UMass	3	–	6	3	–	8
Richmond	3	–	6	3	–	8
New Hampshire	2	–	7	4	–	7
James Madison	0	–	9	2	–	9
+ – Conference co-champions; ^ – NCAA Division I-AA playoff participant; Rankings from The Sports Network poll

The 2001 Maine Black Bears football team represented the University of Maine during the 2001 NCAA Division I-AA football season. It was the program's 110th season and they finished in a four-way tie as Atlantic 10 Conference (A-10) co-champions with Hofstra, Villanova, and William & Mary. Each team finished with identical 7–2 conference records. The Black Bears earned a berth into the 16-team Division I-AA playoffs, but lost in the quarterfinals to Northern Iowa, 28–56. Maine was led by ninth-year head coach Jack Cosgrove.

== Schedule ==
Date	Time	Opponent	Rank	Site	TV	Result	Attendance	Source
September 8	7:00 p.m.	Colgate*		Alfond Stadium; Orono, ME		W 34–10	5,311	
September 15		at North Dakota State*		Fargodome; Fargo, ND		Canceled (Note: The North Dakota State game was canceled due to the nationwide halt on air travel that followed the September 11th attacks.)		
September 22	6:00 p.m.	at No. 14 Hofstra		James M. Shuart Stadium; Hempstead, NY	MSG Network	L 44–51	3,109	
September 29	7:00 p.m.	James Madison		Alfond Stadium; Orono, ME		W 13–3	8,011	
October 6	7:00 p.m.	No. 24 Richmond		Alfond Stadium; Orono, ME		W 14–3	2,619	
October 13		at Northeastern		Parsons Field; Brookline, MA		W 21–9		
October 20	12:00 p.m.	No. 19 Villanova	No. 24	Alfond Stadium; Orono, ME		W 44–40	5,717	
October 27	12:00 p.m.	at William & Mary	No. 18	Zable Stadium; Williamsburg, VA	CSN	L 20–42	9,359	
November 3	12:00 p.m.	at No. 8 Rhode Island	No. 24	Meade Stadium; Kingston, RI		W 26–14	5,803	
November 10	12:00 p.m.	UMass	No. 19	Alfond Stadium; Orono, ME		W 37–7	3,341	
November 17	12:00 p.m.	at New Hampshire	No. 18	Wildcat Stadium; Durham, NH (Battle for the Brice–Cowell Musket)		W 57–24	3,341	
December 1	8:00 p.m.	at No. 10 McNeese State*	No. 16	Cowboy Stadium; Lake Charles, LA (NCAA Division I-AA First Round)		W 14–10	12,450	
December 8	2:30 p.m.	at No. 6 Northern Iowa*	No. 16	UNI-Dome; Cedar Falls, IA (2001 NCAA Division I-AA Quarterfinal)		L 28–56	9,525	
*Non-conference game; Rankings from The Sports Network Poll released prior to the game; All times are in Eastern time

== Awards and honors ==
- All-America – Lennard Byrd (Associated Press); Stephen Cooper (Associated Press); Chad Hayes (Associated Press)
- First Team All-Atlantic 10 – Lennard Byrd, Stephen Cooper
- Second Team All-Atlantic 10 – Royston English
- Third Team All-Atlantic 10 – Brendan Curry, David Cusano, Stefan Gomes, Zack Magliaro
- Atlantic 10 Defensive Player of the Year – Stephen Cooper
- Atlantic 10 Coach of the Year – Jack Cosgrove
