= 2001 Jacksonville State Gamecocks football team =

American college football season

2001 Jacksonville State Gamecocks football
- Conference: Southland Football League
- Record: 5–6 (2–4 Southland)
- Head coach: Jack Crowe (2nd season)
- Offensive coordinator: Willie J. Slater (2nd season)
- Defensive coordinator: Greg Stewart (2nd season)
- Home stadium: Paul Snow Stadium

2001 Southland Football League standings
	Conf.			Overall
Team	W		L	W		L
No. 7 Sam Houston State +^	5	–	1	10	–	3
No. 13 McNeese State +^	5	–	1	8	–	4
No. 14 Northwestern State ^	4	–	2	8	–	4
Stephen F. Austin	4	–	2	6	–	5
Jacksonville State	2	–	4	5	–	6
Nicholls State	1	–	5	3	–	8
Southwest Texas State	0	–	6	4	–	7
+ – Conference co-champions; ^ – NCAA Division I-AA playoff participant; Rankings from The Sports Network poll

The 2001 Jacksonville State Gamecocks football team represented Jacksonville State University as a member of the Southland Football League during the 2001 NCAA Division I-AA football season. The Gamecocks compiled an overall record of 5–6 with a mark of 2–4 in conference play, placing fifth in the Southland. Jacksonville State played home games at Paul Snow Stadium in Jacksonville, Alabama.

== Schedule ==
Date	Time	Opponent	Rank	Site	Result	Attendance	Source
August 30	7:00 p.m.	Cumberland (TN)*		Paul Snow Stadium; Jacksonville, AL	W 72–10	11,312	
September 8	7:00 p.m.	Nicholls State		Paul Snow Stadium; Jacksonville, AL	W 34–15	9,289	
September 22	6:00 p.m.	at Arkansas State*		Indian Stadium; Jonesboro, AR	W 31–28	12,126	
October 6	6:00 p.m.	at Samford*		Seibert Stadium; Homewood, AL (rivalry)	W 39–7	8,235	
October 13	2:00 p.m.	at No. 23 Stephen F. Austin	No. 21	Homer Bryce Stadium; Nacogdoches, TX	L 37–44 ^{OT}	10,130	
October 20	2:00 p.m.	No. 21 Southwest Texas State		Paul Snow Stadium; Jacksonville, AL	W 38–17	12,432	
October 27	2:00 p.m.	at No. 15 Northwestern State	No. 22	Harry Turpin Stadium; Natchitoches, LA	L 17–42	8,816	
November 3	4:00 p.m.	Tennessee Tech*		Paul Snow Stadium; Jacksonville, AL	L 27–35	10,983	
November 10	2:00 p.m.	at No. 18 Sam Houston State		Bowers Stadium; Huntsville, TX	L 30–55	9,148	
November 17	1:00 p.m.	at Troy State*		Veterans Memorial Stadium; Troy, AL (Battle for the Ol' School Bell)	L 3–21	17,357	
November 24	7:00 p.m.	No. 11 McNeese State		Paul Snow Stadium; Jacksonville, AL	L 21–31	7,842	
*Non-conference game; Rankings from The Sports Network Poll released prior to the game; All times are in Central time
