= 2001 Stephen F. Austin Lumberjacks football team =

American college football season

2001 Stephen F. Austin Lumberjacks football
- Conference: Southland Conference
- Record: 6–5 (4–2 SLC)
- Head coach: Mike Santiago (3rd season)
- Home stadium: Homer Bryce Stadium

2001 Southland Football League standings
	Conf.			Overall
Team	W		L	W		L
No. 7 Sam Houston State +^	5	–	1	10	–	3
No. 13 McNeese State +^	5	–	1	8	–	4
No. 14 Northwestern State ^	4	–	2	8	–	4
Stephen F. Austin	4	–	2	6	–	5
Jacksonville State	2	–	4	5	–	6
Nicholls State	1	–	5	3	–	8
Southwest Texas State	0	–	6	4	–	7
+ – Conference co-champions; ^ – NCAA Division I-AA playoff participant; Rankings from The Sports Network poll

The 2001 Stephen F. Austin Lumberjacks football team was an American football team that represented Stephen F. Austin State University as a member of the Southland Conference during the 2001 NCAA Division I-AA football season. In their third year under head coach Mike Santiago, the team compiled an overall record of 6–5, with a mark of 4–2 in conference play, and finished tied for third in the Southland.

== Schedule ==
Date	Opponent	Rank	Site	Result	Attendance	Source
September 1	No. 18 Portland State*		Homer Bryce Stadium; Nacogdoches, TX	L 13–16	5,238	
September 8	at Northern Arizona*		Walkup Skydome; Flagstaff, AZ	L 3–10	7,011	
September 15	Northern Iowa*		Homer Bryce Stadium; Nacogdoches, TX	Canceled (Note: The Northern Iowa game was canceled in the aftermath of the September 11 attacks.)	N/A	
September 22	Cal State Northridge*		Homer Bryce Stadium; Nacogdoches, TX	W 30–27 ^{OT}	9,327	
September 29	at Indiana State*		Memorial Stadium; Terre Haute, IN	W 31–13	3,971	
October 6	at No. 4 McNeese State		Cowboy Stadium; Lake Charles, LA	W 26–14	15,054	
October 13	No. 21 Jacksonville State	No. 23	Homer Bryce Stadium; Nacogdoches, TX	W 44–37 ^{OT}	10,130	
October 18	at No. 15 Sam Houston State	No. 19	Bowers Stadium; Huntsville, TX (rivalry)	L 21–24	12,524	
November 3	Nicholls State	No. 22	Homer Bryce Stadium; Nacogdoches, TX	W 23–21	6,231	
November 10	Southwest Texas State	No. 21	Homer Bryce Stadium; Nacogdoches, TX	W 35–13	7,335	
November 17	at No. 16 Northwestern State	No. 21	Harry Turpin Stadium; Natchitoches, LA (rivalry)	L 17–31	11,216	
November 24	at Texas Tech*		Jones SBC Stadium; Lubbock, TX	L 3–58	31,147	
*Non-conference game; Rankings from The Sports Network Poll released prior to the game
