= 2001 Montana Grizzlies football team =

American college football season

2001 Montana Grizzlies football

NCAA Division I-AA champion Big Sky champion

NCAA Division I-AA Championship Game, W 13–6 vs. Furman
- Conference: Big Sky Conference

Ranking
- Sports Network: No. 1
- Record: 15–1 (7–0 Big Sky)
- Head coach: Joe Glenn (2nd season)
- Home stadium: Washington–Grizzly Stadium

2001 Big Sky Conference football standings
	Conf.			Overall
Team	W		L	W		L
No. 1 Montana $^	7	–	0	15	–	1
No. 16 Northern Arizona ^	5	–	2	9	–	4
Portland State	5	–	2	7	–	4
Montana State	4	–	3	5	–	6
Eastern Washington	3	–	4	7	–	4
Weber State	2	–	5	3	–	8
Idaho State	1	–	6	4	–	7
Sacramento State	1	–	6	2	–	9
$ – Conference champion; ^ – NCAA Division I-AA playoff participant; Rankings from The Sports Network poll

The 2001 Montana Grizzlies football team represented the University of Montana as a member of the Big Sky Conference during the 2001 NCAA Division I-AA football season. Led by second-year head coach Joe Glenn, the Grizzlies compiled an overall record of 15–1, with a mark of 7–0 in conference play, and won the Big Sky title for the fourth consecutive season. Montana advanced to the NCAA Division I-AA Football Championship playoffs, where the Grizzlies defeated Northwestern State in the first round, Sam Houston State in the quarterfinals, and Northern Iowa in the semifinals, and Furman in the NCAA Division I-AA Championship Game. The team played home games at Washington–Grizzly Stadium in Missoula, Montana.

== Schedule ==
Date	Time	Opponent	Rank	Site	TV	Result	Attendance	Source
September 1	7:00 pm	at Cal Poly*	No. 2	Mustang Stadium; San Luis Obispo, CA	MTN	W 31–17	8,007	
September 8	10:00 pm	vs. Hawaii*	No. 2	War Memorial Stadium; Wailuku, HI	MTN	L 12–30	11,254	
September 22	1:00 pm	Western Washington*	No. 2	Washington–Grizzly Stadium; Missoula, MT	MTN	W 30–0	18,398	
September 29	1:00 pm	No. 15 Eastern Washington	No. 3	Washington–Grizzly Stadium; Missoula, MT (EWU–UM Governors Cup)	MTN	W 29–26 ^{2OT}	19,198	
October 6	7:05 pm	at Sacramento State	No. 2	Hornet Stadium; Sacramento, CA	MTN	W 42–7	13,586	
October 13	1:00 pm	Saint Mary's*^{†}	No. 2	Washington–Grizzly Stadium; Missoula, MT	MTN	W 49–19	19,242	
October 20	3:05 pm	at No. 18 Northern Arizona	No. 2	Walkup Skydome; Flagstaff, AZ	MTN	W 38–27	11,387	
October 27	1:00 pm	Portland State	No. 2	Washington–Grizzly Stadium; Missoula, MT	MTN	W 33–13	19,238	
November 3	6:35 pm	at Idaho State	No. 1	Holt Arena; Pocatello, ID	MTN	W 32–28	9,242	
November 10	12:00 pm	Weber State	No. 1	Washington–Grizzly Stadium; Missoula, MT	MTN	W 38–23	17,062	
November 17	12:00 pm	at Montana State	No. 1	Bobcat Stadium; Bozeman, MT (rivalry)	MTN	W 38–27	15,238	
November 24	12:00 pm	Idaho*	No. 1	Washington–Grizzly Stadium; Missoula, MT (Little Brown Stein)	MTN	W 33–27 ^{2OT}	18,056	
December 1	12:00 pm	Northwestern State*	No. 1	Washington–Grizzly Stadium; Missoula, MT (NCAA Division I-AA First Round)	MTN	W 28–19	17,289	
December 8	12:00 pm	No. 13 Sam Houston State*	No. 1	Washington–Grizzly Stadium; Missoula, MT (NCAA Division I-AA Quarterfinal)	MTN	W 49–24	18,125	
December 15	12:00 pm	No. 6 Northern Iowa*	No. 1	Washington–Grizzly Stadium; Missoula, MT (NCAA Division I-AA Semifinal)	MTN	W 38–0	18,848	
December 21	3:30 pm	vs. No. 3 Furman*	No. 1	Finley Stadium; Chattanooga, TN (NCAA Division I-AA Championship Game)	ESPN	W 13–6	12,698	
*Non-conference game; ^{†}Homecoming; Rankings from The Sports Network Poll released prior to the game; All times are in Mountain time

== Roster ==
2001 Montana Grizzlies football team roster
Players
Coaches
Offense

Pos.	#	Name	Class
QB	5	John Edwards	Jr
QB	16	Brandon Neill	Jr
WR	17	Etu Molden	Sr
RB	22	Yohance Humphery	Sr
TE	44	John Fitzgerald	Sr
OT	64	Dylan Brown	Fr
C	65	Garth Enger	Fr
OT	72	Dylan McFarland	So
G	73	Thatcher Szalay	Sr
OT	74	Beau Hart	Fr
OT	75	Cory Procter	Fr
OT	76	Brad Rhoades	Fr
OT	77	Jon Skinner	So
WR	80	Brock Sunderland	Jr
WR	81	Rory Zikmund	Jr
WR	85	Randyn Akiona	Jr

Defense

Pos.	#	Name	Class
SS	3	Trey Young	Jr
FS	4	David DeCoite	So
CB	11	Vernon Smith	So
CB	13	Calvin Coleman	Sr
CB	33	Joel Rosenburg	Jr
LB	45	Jacob Yoro	Jr
LB	53	Joel Robinson	So
DT	90	Curt Colter	Jr
DE	37	Ciche Pitcher	Jr
DT	98	Jason Francis	Sr
DT	99	Alan Saenz	Fr

Special teams

Pos.	#	Name	Class

Head coach

- Joe Glenn

Coordinators/assistant coaches

Legend

- (C) Team captain
- (S) Suspended
- (I) Ineligible
- Injured
- Redshirt

Roster
