= 2001 UC Davis Aggies football team =

American college football season

2001 UC Davis Aggies football

NCAA Division II Semifinal, L 2–14 at North Dakota
- Conference: Independent

Ranking
- AFCA: No. 5
- Record: 10–3
- Head coach: Bob Biggs (9th season)
- Offensive coordinator: Mike Moroski (9th season)
- Home stadium: Toomey Field

2001 NCAA Division II independents football records
| | Conf. | | | Overall |
| Team | W | | L | W | | L |
|---|---|---|---|---|---|---|
| No. 5 UC Davis ^ | | – | | 10 | – | 3 |
| Gannon | | – | | 5 | – | 4 |
| New Haven | | – | | 5 | – | 4 |
| Western New Mexico | | – | | 3 | – | 7 |
| Quincy | | – | | 2 | – | 8 |
| Saint Joseph's (IN) | | – | | 2 | – | 8 |
| Kentucky Wesleyan | | – | | 1 | – | 9 |
| Oklahoma Panhandle State | | – | | 0 | – | 10 |
^ – NCAA Division II playoff participant; Rankings from AFCA poll

The 2001 UC Davis football team represented the University of California, Davis as an independent during the 2001 NCAA Division II football season. Led by ninth-year head coach Bob Biggs, UC Davis compiled an overall record of 10–3. 2001 was the 32nd consecutive winning season for the Aggies. UC Davis was ranked No. 12 in the NCAA Division II poll at the end of the regular season and advanced to the NCAA Division II Football Championship playoffs for the sixth straight year. The Aggies defeated 11th-ranked Texas A&M–Kingsville in the first round and 17th-ranked Tarleton State in the quarterfinals before losing in semifinal round to fourth-ranked and eventual national champion North Dakota. The team outscored their opponents 490 to 286 for the season. The Aggies played home games at Toomey Field in Davis, California.

== Schedule ==
| Date | Opponent | Rank | Site | Result | Attendance | Source |
|---|---|---|---|---|---|---|
| September 1 | at New Mexico Highlands | No. 3 | Perkins Stadium; Las Vegas, NM | W 51–6 | | |
| September 8 | at Abilene Christian | No. 3 | Shotwell Stadium; Abilene, TX | W 41–28 | | |
| September 22 | Western Oregon | No. 3 | Toomey Field; Davis, CA | W 43–32 | | |
| September 29 | at Humboldt State | No. 3 | Redwood Bowl; Arcata, CA | W 56–14 | | |
| October 6 | at Saint Mary’s | No. 3 | Saint Mary’s Stadium; Moraga, CA | L 21–28 | | |
| October 13 | Cal State Northridge | No. 13 | Toomey Field; Davis, CA | W 38–31 | 6,600 | |
| October 20 | Cal Poly | No. 10 | Toomey Field; Davis, CA (rivalry) | L 28–31 | | |
| October 27 | at Sacramento State | No. 15 | Hornet Stadium; Sacramento, CA (Causeway Classic) | W 43–0 | 17,328 | |
| November 3 | Central Washington | No. 15 | Toomey Field; Davis, CA | W 48–13 | | |
| November 10 | No. 17 Western Washington | No. 14 | Toomey Field; Davis, CA | W 40–32 | | |
| November 17 | at No. 11 Texas A&M–Kingsville | No. 12 | Javelina Stadium; Kingsville, TX (NCAA Division II First Round) | W 37–32 | | |
| November 24 | No. 17 Tarleton State | No. 12 | Toomey Field; Davis, CA (NCAA Division II Quarterfinal) | W 42–25 | | |
| December 1 | at No. 4 North Dakota | No. 12 | Alerus Center; Grand Forks, ND (NCAA Division II Semifinal) | L 2–14 | 11,696 | |
Rankings from AFCA Poll released prior to the game

== NFL draft ==
The following UC Davis Aggies players were selected in the 2002 NFL draft.

| Player | Position | Round | Overall | NFL team |
| JT O'Sullivan | Quarterback | 6 | 186 | New Orleans Saints |
