= 2001 Portland State Vikings football team =

American college football season

2001 Portland State Vikings football
- Conference: Big Sky Conference
- Record: 7–4 (5–2 Big Sky)
- Head coach: Tim Walsh (9th season)
- Home stadium: PGE Park

2001 Big Sky Conference football standings
	Conf.			Overall
Team	W		L	W		L
No. 1 Montana $^	7	–	0	15	–	1
No. 16 Northern Arizona ^	5	–	2	9	–	4
Portland State	5	–	2	7	–	4
Montana State	4	–	3	5	–	6
Eastern Washington	3	–	4	7	–	4
Weber State	2	–	5	3	–	8
Idaho State	1	–	6	4	–	7
Sacramento State	1	–	6	2	–	9
$ – Conference champion; ^ – NCAA Division I-AA playoff participant; Rankings from The Sports Network poll

The 2001 Portland State Vikings football team was an American football team that represented Portland State University during the 2001 NCAA Division I-AA football season as a member of the Big Sky Conference. In their ninth year under head coach Tim Walsh, the team compiled an 7–4 record, with a mark of 5–2 in conference play, and finished tied for second in the Big Sky. The Vikings played their home games at PGE Park in Portland, Oregon.

== Schedule ==
Date	Opponent	Rank	Site	Result	Attendance	Source
September 1	at Stephen F. Austin*	No. 18	Homer Bryce Stadium; Nacogdoches, TX	W 16–13	5,238	
September 22	No. 15 Grambling State*	No. 17	PGE Park; Portland, OR (Vanport Classic)	L 29–30	16,171	
September 29	No. 21 Northern Arizona	No. 23	PGE Park; Portland, OR	W 33–30	7,231	
October 6	at No. 19 Southwest Texas State*	No. 21	Bobcat Stadium; San Marcos, TX	L 20–23	9,464	
October 13	at Idaho State		Holt Arena; Pocatello, ID	L 17–23	7,979	
October 20	Weber State		PGE Park; Portland, OR	W 65–43		
October 27	at No. 2 Montana		Washington–Grizzly Stadium; Missoula, MT	L 13–33	19,238	
November 3	Montana State		PGE Park; Portland, OR	W 33–21	4,244	
November 10	at Eastern Washington		Woodward Field; Cheney, WA (rivalry)	W 37–22		
November 17	Cal State Northridge*		PGE Park; Portland, OR	W 50–43	4,017	
November 24	Sacramento State		PGE Park; Portland, OR	W 52–33	3,747	
*Non-conference game; Rankings from The Sports Network Poll released prior to the game
