= 2001 Southwest Texas State Bobcats football team =

American college football season

2001 Southwest Texas State Bobcats football
- Conference: Southland Football League
- Record: 4–7 (0–6 Southland)
- Head coach: Bob DeBesse (5th season)
- Offensive coordinator: Blake Miller (1st season)
- Defensive coordinator: Mike Hudson (1st season)
- Home stadium: Bobcat Stadium

2001 Southland Football League standings
	Conf.			Overall
Team	W		L	W		L
No. 7 Sam Houston State +^	5	–	1	10	–	3
No. 13 McNeese State +^	5	–	1	8	–	4
No. 14 Northwestern State ^	4	–	2	8	–	4
Stephen F. Austin	4	–	2	6	–	5
Jacksonville State	2	–	4	5	–	6
Nicholls State	1	–	5	3	–	8
Southwest Texas State	0	–	6	4	–	7
+ – Conference co-champions; ^ – NCAA Division I-AA playoff participant; Rankings from The Sports Network poll

The 2001 Southwest Texas State Bobcats football team was an American football team that represented Southwest Texas State University (now known as Texas State University) during the 2001 NCAA Division I-AA football season as a member of the Southland Football League. In their fifth year under head coach Bob DeBesse, the team compiled an overall record of 4–7 with a mark of 0–6 in conference play.

== Schedule ==
Date	Opponent	Rank	Site	Result	Attendance	Source
August 30	Arkansas–Monticello*	No. 17	Bobcat Stadium; San Marcos, TX	W 52–7	9,721	
September 8	at Missouri*	No. 17	Faurot Field; Columbia, MO	L 6–40	51,689	
September 15	at Cal State Northridge*	No. 20	North Campus Stadium; Northridge, CA	Canceled (Note: The Cal State Northridge game was initially postponed and later canceled in the aftermath of the September 11 attacks.)		
September 22	Angelo State*	No. 20	Bobcat Stadium; San Marcos, TX	W 10–0	10,921	
September 29	at Illinois State*	No. 19	Hancock Stadium; Normal, IL	W 20–13	12,461	
October 6	No. 21 Portland State*	No. 19	Bobcat Stadium; San Marcos, TX	W 23–20	9,464	
October 13	No. 13 McNeese State	No. 17	Bobcat Stadium; San Marcos, TX	L 3–24	11,617	
October 20	at Jacksonville State	No. 21	Paul Snow Stadium; Jacksonville, AL	L 17–38	12,432	
October 27	at Nicholls State		John L. Guidry Stadium; Thibodaux, LA (Battle for the Paddle)	L 14–33		
November 3	No. 12 Northwestern State		Bobcat Stadium; San Marcos, TX	L 17–20		
November 10	at No. 21 Stephen F. Austin		Homer Bryce Stadium; Nacogdoches, TX	L 13–35		
November 17	No. 14 Sam Houston State		Bobcat Stadium; San Marcos, TX (rivalry)	L 13–31		
*Non-conference game; Rankings from The Sports Network Poll released prior to the game
