= 2001 Villanova Wildcats football team =

American college football season

2001 Villanova Wildcats football

A-10 co-champion
- Conference: Atlantic 10 Conference

Ranking
- Sports Network: No. 20
- Record: 8–3 (7–2 A-10)
- Head coach: Andy Talley (17th season)
- Offensive coordinator: Sam Venuto (3rd season)
- Offensive scheme: Multiple spread
- Defensive coordinator: Joe Trainer (5th season)
- Base defense: 4–3
- Home stadium: Villanova Stadium

2001 Atlantic 10 Conference football standings
	Conf.			Overall
Team	W		L	W		L
No. 11 Hofstra +^	7	–	2	9	–	3
No. 10 Maine +^	7	–	2	9	–	3
No. 20 Villanova +	7	–	2	8	–	3
No. 17 William & Mary +^	7	–	2	8	–	4
No. 21 Rhode Island	6	–	3	8	–	3
Delaware	4	–	5	4	–	6
Northeastern	4	–	5	5	–	6
UMass	3	–	6	3	–	8
Richmond	3	–	6	3	–	8
New Hampshire	2	–	7	4	–	7
James Madison	0	–	9	2	–	9
+ – Conference co-champions; ^ – NCAA Division I-AA playoff participant; Rankings from The Sports Network poll

The 2001 Villanova Wildcats football team represented the Villanova University during the 2001 NCAA Division I-AA football season. The Wildcats were led by 17th-year head coach Andy Talley played their home games at Villanova Stadium in Villanova, Pennsylvania.

== Schedule ==
Date	Opponent	Rank	Site	Result	Attendance	Source
August 30	Colgate*	No. 20	Villanova Stadium; Villanova, PA	W 38–14	10,971	
September 8	at Northeastern	No. 18	Parsons Field; Brookline, MA	W 31–14		
September 29	at No. 17 Richmond	No. 14	University of Richmond Stadium; Richmond, VA	W 31–30	12,200	
October 6	James Madison	No. 13	Villanova Stadium; Villanova, PA	W 45–44	11,761	
October 12	New Haven*	No. 12	Villanova Stadium; Villanova, PA	L 14–17		
October 20	at No. 24 Maine	No. 20	Alfond Stadium; Orono, ME	L 40–44	5,717	
October 27	UMass		Villanova Stadium; Villanova, PA	W 47–13	7,897	
November 3	at New Hampshire		Wildcat Stadium; Durham, NH	W 38–35		
November 10	at Hofstra	No. 23	James M. Shuart Stadium; Hempstead, NY	W 54–34	5,341	
November 17	at Delaware	No. 17	Delaware Stadium; Newark, DE (rivalry)	W 19–14	11,829	
November 24	at No. 20 William & Mary	No. 15	Zable Stadium; Williamsburg, VA	L 44–47	4,236	
*Non-conference game; Rankings from The Sports Network Poll released prior to the game
