= 2001 Northern Arizona Lumberjacks football team =

American college football season

2001 Northern Arizona Lumberjacks football
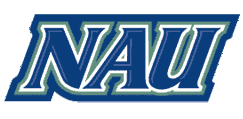

NCAA Division I-AA First Round, L 31–34 at Sam Houston State
- Conference: Big Sky Conference

Ranking
- Sports Network: No. 16
- Record: 8–4 (5–2 Big Sky)
- Head coach: Jerome Souers (4th season)
- Home stadium: J. Lawrence Walkup Skydome

2001 Big Sky Conference football standings
	Conf.			Overall
Team	W		L	W		L
No. 1 Montana $^	7	–	0	15	–	1
No. 16 Northern Arizona ^	5	–	2	9	–	4
Portland State	5	–	2	7	–	4
Montana State	4	–	3	5	–	6
Eastern Washington	3	–	4	7	–	4
Weber State	2	–	5	3	–	8
Idaho State	1	–	6	4	–	7
Sacramento State	1	–	6	2	–	9
$ – Conference champion; ^ – NCAA Division I-AA playoff participant; Rankings from The Sports Network poll

The 2001 Northern Arizona Lumberjacks football team was an American football team that represented Northern Arizona University (NAU) as a member of the Big Sky Conference (Big Sky) during the 2001 NCAA Division I-AA football season. In their fourth year under head coach Jerome Souers, the Lumberjacks compiled an 8–4 record (5–2 against conference opponents), outscored opponents by a total of 368 to 307, and tied for second place out of nine teams in the Big Sky.

For the third time in school history, the Lumberjacks qualified to play in the NCAA Division I-AA playoffs. They lost by a 34–31 score to Sam Houston State in the first round.

The team played its home games at the J. Lawrence Walkup Skydome, commonly known as the Walkup Skydome, in Flagstaff, Arizona.

The team's statistical leaders included Marcus King with 1,287 rushing yards (including 271 yards against Portland State and 248 yards against Eastern Washington) and Preston Parsons with 2,267 passing yards. Linebacker Keith O'Neil received first-team All-Big Sky honors and later played four years in the National Football League.

== Schedule ==
Date	Opponent	Rank	Site	Result	Attendance	Source
August 30	Cal State Northridge*		Walkup Skydome; Flagstaff, AZ	W 30–17	4,633	
September 8	Stephen F. Austin*		Walkup Skydome; Flagstaff, AZ	W 10–3	7,011	
September 15	at Oklahoma State*		Lewis Field; Stillwater, OK	Canceled		
September 22	at Southern Utah*	No. 25	Eccles Coliseum; Cedar City, UT (rivalry)	W 41–12	6,201	
September 29	at No. 23 Portland State	No. 21	PGE Park; Portland, OR	L 30–33	7,231	
October 6	Idaho State		Walkup Skydome; Flagstaff, AZ	W 51–26	10,810	
October 13	at Weber State	No. 22	Stewart Stadium; Ogden, UT	W 42–32	6,893	
October 20	No. 2 Montana	No. 18	Walkup Skydome; Flagstaff, AZ	L 37–48	11,387	
October 27	at Montana State	No. 21	Bobcat Stadium; Bozeman, MT	W 35–28	10,857	
November 3	No. 21 Eastern Washington	No. 17	Walkup Skydome; Flagstaff, AZ	W 42–33	4,164	
November 10	at Sacramento State	No. 16	Hornet Stadium; Sacramento, CA	W 50–40	5,510	
November 17	at Oregon State*	No. 13	Reser Stadium; Corvallis, OR	L 10–45	39,096	
December 1	at No. 13 Sam Houston State*	No. 15	Bowers Stadium; Huntsville, TX (NCAA Division I-AA First Round)	L 31–34	8,134	
*Non-conference game; Rankings from The Sports Network Poll released prior to the game
