= Hofstra Pride football =

Intercollegiate American football team

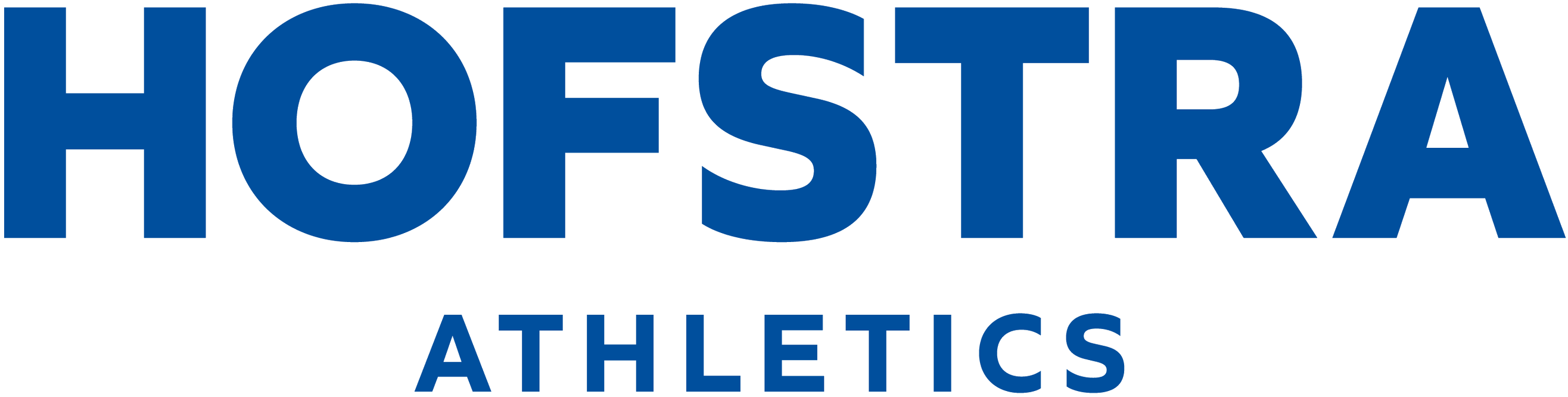
- First season: 1937; 89 years ago
- Last season: 2009; 17 years ago
- Location: Hempstead, New York
- Stadium: James M. Shuart Stadium (capacity: 15,000)
- NCAA division: Division I FCS
- Conference: Colonial Athletic Association
- Colors: Blue, white, and gold
- All-time record: 403–268–11 (.599)

Conference championships
- 1 (2001)

The Hofstra Pride football (formerly the Hofstra Flying Dutchmen) program was the intercollegiate American football team for Hofstra University, located on Long Island in Hempstead, New York. Hofstra competed in the NCAA Division I Football Championship Subdivision (FCS) and were members of the Colonial Athletic Association. Its first football team was fielded in 1937, and the program compiled a 403–268–11 (.599) record through 2009.

The nickname changed to Pride in 2000. Following the 2009 season, the university announced the termination of the football program. Funds previously used for the football program went into the creation of the Zucker School of Medicine.

== Retired numbers ==
Hofstra Pride retired numbers
No.	Player	Pos.	Tenure	Ref.
3	Wayne Chrebet	WR	1991–1994	
33	Walter Kohanowich	HB	1948–1952	
74	Dave Fiore	OT	1992–1995	
77	John Schmitt	C	1961–1963	
89	Marques Colston	WR	2001–2005	

== Playoff appearances ==
=== NCAA Division I-AA ===
The Pride made five appearances in the NCAA Division I-AA/FCS playoffs with a combined record of 2–5.

Year	Round	Opponent	Result
1995	First Round	Delaware	L, 17–33
1997	First Round	Delaware	L, 14–24
1999	First Round; Quarterfinals	Lehigh; Illinois State	W, 27–15; L, 20–37
2000	First Round; Quarterfinals	Furman; Georgia Southern	W, 31–24; L, 20–48
2001	First Round	Lehigh	L, 24–27 ^{OT}

=== NCAA Division III ===
As the Flying Dutchmen, Hofstra made six appearances in the NCAA Division III playoffs, with a combined record of 2–6.

Year	Round	Opponent	Result
1983	First Round	Union (NY)	L, 19–51
1986	First Round	Montclair State	L, 21–24
1987	First Round	Fordham	L, 6–41
1988	First Round	Cortland	L, 17–32
1989	First Round	Montclair State	L, 6–23
1990	First Round; Quarterfinals; Semifinals	Cortland; Trenton State; Lycoming	W, 35–9; W, 38–3; L, 10–20

== Championships ==
=== Conference championships ===
Year	Conference	Coach	Overall record	Conference record
2001	Atlantic 10 Conference (co-championship)	Joe Gardi	9–3	7–2
Total conference championships			1
