= Joe Gardi =

American football coach (1939–2010)

- Gardi during his tenure at Hofstra

Biographical details
- Born: March 2, 1939; Harrison, New Jersey, U.S.
- Died: June 2, 2010 (aged 71); Sayville, New York, U.S.

Playing career
- 1956–1959: Maryland
- 1960: Washington Redskins (preseason)
- 1961: Buffalo Bills (training camp only)
- Positions: Linebacker, offensive tackle

Coaching career (HC unless noted)
- 1964–1966: Oratory Prep (NJ)
- 1967–1969: Roselle Park (NJ)
- 1970: Maryland (freshman/RC)
- 1971: Maryland (OL)
- 1972–1973: Maryland (WR)
- 1974: Philadelphia Bell (ST/RB)
- 1975: Philadelphia Bell (interim HC)
- 1975: Portland Thunder
- 1976: New York Jets (ST/TE)
- 1977–1980: New York Jets (ST/LB)
- 1981–1982: New York Jets (DC)
- 1983–1985: New York Jets (AHC/DC)
- 1990–2005: Hofstra

Head coaching record
- Overall: 119–62–2 (college)
- Tournaments: 2–1 (NCAA D-III playoffs); 2–5 (NCAA D-I-AA playoffs)

Accomplishments and honors

Championships
- 1 A-10 (2001)

Joseph T. Gardi (March 2, 1939 – June 2, 2010) was an American football coach. He served as the head football coach at Hofstra University for 16 seasons, from 1990 to 2005, compiling a record of 119–62–2. He is the father of NFL executive Dave Gardi.

== Early life ==
Gardi was raised in Harrison, New Jersey where he attended Harrison High School. While there, he was named a first-team all-state offensive guard as a senior in 1955.

He attended the University of Maryland, where he played football from 1959 to 1960 as an offensive tackle and linebacker. He served as a team co-captain and received the Unsung Hero Award. He graduated with a Bachelor of Science degree in business administration.

In 1960, he was signed by the Washington Redskins of the National Football League (NFL). He played in two pre-season games before being released. In 1961, he attended camp with the Buffalo Bills, but did not make the team.

== Coaching career ==
=== High school ===
In 1964, he was hired as the head football coach for the Oratory Preparatory School in Summit, New Jersey. The team had lost 37 consecutive games prior to Gardi's arrival. In his first season, they again recorded a winless season with a 0–9 record. The following years he compiled 6–3 and 5–4 seasons, for a combined 11–16 record. In 1967, he took over as head coach at Roselle Park High School. That team had not secured a winning season in the previous decade. In his first season Gardi's team compiled a 2–7 record, followed by 6–3 and 9–0 records. In 1969, he coached the team to the New Jersey state championship.

=== Maryland ===
In 1970, Gardi returned to his alma mater to assume the roles of assistant head coach for the freshman team and recruiting coordinator. That year, he was responsible for recruiting future star quarterback, Bob Avellini. In 1972, he was promoted to the offensive line coach. In 1973, after new head coach Jerry Claiborne took over at Maryland, he retained Gardi and moved him to wide receivers coach.

=== Professional football ===
In 1974, Gardi began a tenure in the short-lived World Football League. He served as a running backs coach, special teams coach, and interim head coach for the Philadelphia Bell. In 1975, he served as head coach for the Portland Thunder for three games before the league disbanded.

Gardi then served from 1976 to 1984 as an assistant coach for the New York Jets in the NFL. In 1976, he was special teams and tight ends coach under head coach Lou Holtz. Gardi served as special teams and linebackers coach from 1977 to 1980. In 1981 and 1982, he was the defensive coordinator under head coach Walt Michaels. In his first year running the defense, the Jets allowed 304 yards per game, a conference best, and posted 66 sacks, the highest in the NFL. The following season, the Jets participated in the AFC Championship Game, where they lost to the Miami Dolphins. In 1983, Gardi was also named assistant head coach to Joe Walton.

From 1985 to 1990, Gardi served as an NFL assistant supervisor of officials, which included training and supervision of the league's officiating staff.

=== Hofstra ===
He returned to coaching in 1990 when he took the head position at Hofstra University. In his first season, he led his team to a 10–0 regular season and advanced to the Division III playoffs, where they lost in the semifinals. In 1991, Hofstra began the transition process to Division I-AA competition, and played six I-AA opponents and recorded an 8–2 record. The following season they played seven I-AA opponents and compiled a 4–6 record. The 1993 season was Hofstra's first as a full-fledged Division I team, and Gardi's team posted a 6–3–1 record. In 1994, they finished 8–1–1 and were ranked 22nd in the nation. In 1995, Hofstra lost in the first round of the playoffs to finish with a 10–2 record and a number-ten national ranking. In both 1998 and 1999, Hofstra again advanced to the I-AA quarterfinals, and finished with a fifth and seventh ranking, respectively. Hofstra was an Atlantic 10 Conference co-championship and top-ten ranked team in 2001. The 2005 season was Gardi's last and he finished his career at Hofstra having compiled a 119–62–2 record.

== Later life ==
Gardi was inducted into the Suffolk Sports Hall of Fame on Long Island in the Football and Coaches Categories with the Class of 2000. He retired from coaching for good after the 2005 season. Gardi died on June 3, 2010, from complications related to an earlier stroke. During his coaching career, he had helped develop future NFL players such as Wayne Chrebet, Lance Schulters, Marques Colston, Willie Colon, and Raheem Morris.

== Head coaching record ==
=== College ===
Year	Team	Overall	Conference	Standing	Bowl/playoffs
Hofstra Flying Dutchmen (NCAA Division III independent) (1990–1989)
1990	Hofstra	12–1			L NCAA Division III Semifinal
1991	Hofstra	8–2			
1992	Hofstra	4–6			
Hofstra Flying Dutchmen / Pride (NCAA Division I-AA independent) (1993–2000)
1993	Hofstra	6–3–1			
1994	Hofstra	8–1–1			
1995	Hofstra	10–2			L NCAA Division I-AA First Round
1996	Hofstra	5–6			
1997	Hofstra	9–3			L NCAA Division I-AA First Round
1998	Hofstra	8–3			
1999	Hofstra	11–2			L NCAA Division I-AA Quarterfinal
2000	Hofstra	9–4			L NCAA Division I-AA Quarterfinal
Hofstra Pride (Atlantic-10 Conference) (2001–2005)
2001	Hofstra	9–3	7–2	T–1st	L NCAA Division I-AA First Round
2002	Hofstra	6–6	4–5	T–6th	
2003	Hofstra	2–10	2–6	10th	
2004	Hofstra	5–6	3–5	9th	
2005	Hofstra	7–4	6–3	3rd (North)	
Hofstra:		119–62–2	22–21		
Total:		119–62–2			
National championship Conference title Conference division title or championship game berth

== Personal life ==
His son Dave Gardi is an executive with the Tennessee Titans. He previously played college football as a quarterback for the Brown Bears and worked as a National Football League (NFL) administrator and the Washington Commanders as a senior vice president of football initiatives.
