= 2001 NCAA Division II football rankings =

The 2001 NCAA Division II football rankings are from the American Football Coaches Association (AFCA). This is for the 2001 season.

== Legend ==
	Increase in ranking
	Decrease in ranking
	Not ranked previous week
(#–#)	Win–loss record
(Italics)	Number of first place votes
т	Tied with team above or below also with this symbol

== American Football Coaches Association poll ==
	Preseason	Week 1 Sept 4 (Note: Although one was published, no poll for September 4 has been found. 21 of the 25 rankings are known, based on the second regular season poll.)	Week 2 Sept 11	Week 3 Sept 18	Week 4 Sept 25	Week 5 Oct 2	Week 6 Oct 9	Week 7 Oct 16	Week 8 Oct 23	Week 9 Oct 30	Week 10 Nov 6	Week 11 Nov 13	
1.	Delta State	Delta State	Delta State (1–0) (26)	Delta State (2–0) (26)	Delta State (3–0) (26)	Delta State (4–0) (26)	Valdosta State (6–0) (27)	Valdosta State (7–0) (27)	Valdosta State (8–0) (27)	Valdosta State (9–0) (27)	Valdosta State (10–0) (27)	Valdosta State (11–0) (28)	1.
2.	North Dakota State	North Dakota State	North Dakota State (2–0) (1)	North Dakota State (2–0) (1)	North Dakota State (3–0) (1)	North Dakota State (4–0) (1)	Nebraska–Omaha (6–0)	Nebraska–Omaha (6–0)	Nebraska–Omaha (7–0)	Nebraska–Omaha (8–0)	IUP (8–0) (1)	Grand Valley State (10–0)	2.
3.	UC Davis	UC Davis	UC Davis (2–0)	UC Davis (2–0)	UC Davis (3–0)	UC Davis (4–0)	North Dakota (6–0)	North Dakota (7–0)	Catawba (8–0)	IUP (7–0) (1)	Grand Valley State (9–0)	Chadron State (10–0)	3.
4.	Valdosta State	Valdosta State	Valdosta State (2–0) (1)	Valdosta State (3–0) (1)	Valdosta State (4–0) (1)	Valdosta State (5–0) (1)	Catawba (4–0)	Catawba (7–0)	IUP (6–0) (1)	Grand Valley State (8–0)	Chadron State (9–0)	North Dakota (10–1)	4.
5.	Carson–Newman	Nebraska–Omaha	Nebraska–Omaha (2–0)	Nebraska–Omaha (3–0)	Nebraska–Omaha (4–0)	Nebraska–Omaha (5–0)	IUP (6–0)	IUP (5–0) (1)	Grand Valley State (7–0)	Chadron State (8–0)	North Dakota (9–1)	Bloomsburg (9–1)	5.
6.	Northwest Missouri State	Catawba	Catawba (2–0)	Catawba (3–0)	Catawba (4–0)	Catawba (5–0)	Pittsburg State (4–0)	Chadron State (7–0)	Chadron State (8–0)	North Dakota (8–1)	Bloomsburg (8–1)	Pittsburg State (10–1)	6.
7.	Nebraska–Omaha	Bloomsburg	Bloomsburg (1–0)	Bloomsburg (2–0)	Bloomsburg (3–0)	Bloomsburg (4–0)	Tuskegee (6–0)	Grand Valley State (6–0)	Delta State (6–1)	Bloomsburg (7–1)	Pittsburg State (9–1)	Catawba (10–1)	7.
8.	Bloomsburg	Tuskegee	Tuskegee (2–0)	Tuskegee (2–0)	Tuskegee (3–0)	IUP (3–0)	Chadron State (4–1)	Northwest Missouri State (6–1)	North Dakota (7–1)	Pittsburg State (8–1)	Central Arkansas (9–1)	IUP (8–1)	8.
9.	Catawba	Pittsburg State	IUP (1–0)	IUP (1–0)	IUP (2–0)	Tuskegee (3–0)	Delta State (4–1)	Delta State (5–1)	Bloomsburg (6–1)	Central Arkansas (8–1)	Catawba (9–1)	Saginaw Valley State (10–1)	9.
10.	Tuskegee	IUP	Pittsburg State (2–0)	Pittsburg State (3–0)	Pittsburg State (4–0)	Pittsburg State (5–0)	North Dakota State (5–1)	UC Davis (5–1)	Pittsburg State (7–1)	Catawba (8–1)	Nebraska–Omaha (8–1)	Tuskegee (8–1)	10.
11.	IUP (Note: In the actual printed polls, IUP was listed as Indiana (PA))	West Georgia	North Dakota (2–0)	North Dakota (3–0)	North Dakota (4–0)	North Dakota (5–0)	Northwest Missouri State (5–0)	Central Missouri (7–0)	West Georgia (7–1)	Tuskegee (6–1)	Tuskegee (7–1)	Texas A&M–Kingsville (9–1)	11.
12.	Pittsburg State	North Dakota	West Georgia (2–0)	West Georgia (3–0)	Chadron State (4–0)	Chadron State (5–0)	Grand Valley State (4–1)	Shepherd (6–0)	Central Arkansas (7–1)	C.W. Post (9–0)	Saginaw Valley State (9–1)	UC Davis (8–2)	12.
13.	West Georgia	Carson–Newman	Chadron State (2–0)	Chadron State (3–0)	Carson–Newman (2–1)	Northwest Missouri State (4–1)	UC Davis (5–0)	Bloomsburg (5–1)	Tuskegee (5–1)	Tusculum (7–1)	Central Missouri (9–1)	Winona State (10–1)	13.
14.	North Dakota	Northwest Missouri State	Carson–Newman (1–1)	Carson–Newman (1–1)	Northwest Missouri State (3–1)	Carson–Newman (3–1)	Arkansas Tech (6–0)	Pittsburg State (6–1)	C.W. Post (8–0)	Saginaw Valley State (8–1)	UC Davis (7–2)	Central Arkansas (9–2)	14.
15.	Northwood		Grand Valley State (2–0)	Grand Valley State (2–0)	Grand Valley State (3–0)	Grand Valley State (4–0)	Central Missouri (4–1)	West Georgia (6–1)	UC Davis (5–2)	UC Davis (6–2)	Texas A&M–Kingsville (8–1)	Nebraska–Omaha (8–2)	15.
16.	Northeastern State		Northwest Missouri State (1–1)	Northwest Missouri State (2–1)	Arkansas Tech (3–0)	Arkansas Tech (4–0)	Bloomsburg (4–1)	Tuskegee (4–1)	Tusculum (6–1)	Central Missouri (8–1)	Winona State (9–1)	Arkansas Tech (8–2)	16.
17.	Chadron State	Chadron State	Slippery Rock (2–0)	Slippery Rock (2–0)	Kutztown (3–0)	Central Missouri (5–0)	Shepherd (5–0)	Central Arkansas (6–1)	Saginaw Valley State (7–1)	Delta State (6–2)	Western Washington (8–2)	Tarleton State (9–2)	17.
18.	Mesa State	Grand Valley State	Kutztown (2–0)	Kutztown (2–0)	Eastern New Mexico (4–0)	Shepherd (4–0)	West Georgia (5–1)	C.W. Post (7–0)	North Dakota State (5–2)	Shepherd (7–1)	West Georgia (8–2)	Tusculum (8–2)	18.
19.	Presbyterian	Slippery Rock	Missouri Western State (2–0)	Arkansas Tech (2–0)	Central Missouri (4–0)	West Georgia (4–1)	Central Arkansas (5–1)	North Dakota State (4–2)	Northwest Missouri State (6–2)	Winona State (8–1)	Minnesota–Duluth (9–1)	C.W. Post (10–1)	19.
20.	Angelo State	Kutztown	Presbyterian (1–1)	Eastern New Mexico (3–0)	Shepherd (4–0)	Tusculum (5–0)	C.W. Post (6–0)	Tusculum (6–1)	Central Missouri (7–1)	Texas A&M–Kingsville (7–1)	C.W. Post (9–1)	Central Missouri (9–2)	20.
21.	Kutztown		Arkansas Tech (1–0)	Central Arkansas (3–0)	West Georgia (3–1)	Central Arkansas (4–1)	Saginaw Valley State (5–1)	Saginaw Valley State (6–1)	Truman State (7–1)	West Georgia (7–2)	Missouri Western State (8–2)	Fort Valley State (8–2)	21.
22.	Grand Valley State	Presbyterian	Eastern New Mexico (2–0)	Presbyterian (1–1)	Tusculum (4–0)	C.W. Post (5–0)	Tusculum (5–1)	Arkansas Tech (5–1)	Shepherd (6–1)	Western Washington (7–2)	Tusculum (7–2)	North Dakota State (7–3)	22.
23.	Slippery Rock	Fairmont State	Central Arkansas (2–0)	Winston–Salem State (2–1)	Central Arkansas (3–1)	Texas A&M–Kingsville (4–0)	Winona State (5–1)	Winona State (6–1)	Winona State (7–1)	Minnesota–Duluth (8–1)	Arkansas Tech (7–2)	Western Washington (8–3)	23.
24.	Saginaw Valley State	Missouri Western State	Winston–Salem State (2–1)	Central Missouri (3–0)	C.W. Post (4–0)	Saginaw Valley State (4–1)	Texas A&M–Commerce (5–1)	Texas A&M–Commerce (6–1)	Texas A&M–Kingsville (6–1)	Truman State (7–2)	Tarleton State (8–2)	Minnesota–Duluth (9–2)	24.
25.	Western Michigan		Shepherd (2–0)	Shepherd (3–0)	Slippery Rock (2–1)	Eastern New Mexico (4–1)	Carson–Newman (3–2) т	Concordia (MN) (6–1)	Concordia (MN) (7–1)	Mars Hill (7–2)	North Dakota State (6–3)	West Georgia (8–3)	25.
26.							Concordia (MN) (6–0) т						26.
	Preseason	Week 1 Sept 4 (Note: Although one was published, no poll for September 4 has been found. 21 of the 25 rankings are known, based on the second regular season poll.)	Week 2 Sept 11	Week 3 Sept 18	Week 4 Sept 25	Week 5 Oct 2	Week 6 Oct 9	Week 7 Oct 16	Week 8 Oct 23	Week 9 Oct 30	Week 10 Nov 6	Week 11 Nov 13	
		Dropped: 15 Northwood; 16 Northeastern State; 18 Mesa State; 20 Angelo State; 24 Saginaw Valley State; 25 Western Michigan	Dropped: 15; 16; 21; 23 Fairmont State; 25	Dropped: 19 Missouri Western State	Dropped: 22 Presbyterian; 23 Winston–Salem State	Dropped: 17 Kutztown; 25 Slippery Rock	Dropped: 23 Texas A&M–Kingsville; 25 Eastern New Mexico	Dropped: 25 Carson–Newman	Dropped: 22 Arkansas Tech; 24 Texas A&M–Commerce	Dropped: 18 North Dakota State; 19 Northwest Missouri State; 25 Concordia (MN)	Dropped: 17 Delta State; 18 Shepherd; 24 Truman State; 25 Mars Hill	Dropped: 21 Missouri Western State	
