= 2001 NCAA Division I-AA football rankings =

The 2001 NCAA Division I-AA football rankings are from the Sports Network poll of Division I-AA head coaches, athletic directors, sports information directors and media members. This is for the 2001 season. Due to the events of September 11, 2001, all college football games were suspended during the following weekend. As a result, the poll released on September 18 was a repeat of the one released a week earlier.

== Legend ==
	Increase in ranking
	Decrease in ranking
	Not ranked previous week
(#–#)	Win–loss record
(Italics)	Number of first place votes
т	Tied with team above or below also with this symbol

== The Sports Network poll ==
	Preseason	Week 1 Sept 4	Week 2 Sept 11	Week 3 Sept 18	Week 4 Sept 25	Week 5 Oct 2	Week 6 Oct 9	Week 7 Oct 16	Week 8 Oct 23	Week 9 Oct 30	Week 10 Nov 6	Week 11 Nov 13	Week 12 Nov 20	Week 13 Nov 27	Week 14 Postseason	
1.	Georgia Southern (69)	Georgia Southern (1–0) (91)	Georgia Southern (2–0) (95)	Georgia Southern (2–0) (95)	Georgia Southern (3–0) (75)	Georgia Southern (4–0) (93)	Georgia Southern (5–0) (81)	Georgia Southern (6–0) (96)	Georgia Southern (7–0) (90)	Montana (7–1) (61)	Montana (8–1) (79)	Montana (9–1) (85)	Montana (10–1) (67)	Montana (11–1) (53)	Montana (15–1) (37)	1.
2.	Montana (6)	Montana (1–0) (8)	Montana (1–1)	Montana (1–1)	Youngstown State (3–0)	Montana (3–1) (1)	Montana (4–1)	Montana (5–1)	Montana (6–1) (4)	Furman (6–1) (23)	Georgia Southern (8–1) (10)	Georgia Southern (9–1) (5)	Georgia Southern (9–1) (4)	Georgia Southern (10–1) (3)	Furman (12–3)	2.
3.	Western Kentucky	Appalachian State (1–0)	Youngstown State (2–0)	Youngstown State (2–0)	Montana (2–1)	Furman (3–1) (3)	Furman (4–1) (3)	Furman (5–1) (4)	Furman (6–1) (6)	Grambling State (7–0) (8)	Hofstra (8–1) (1)	Eastern Illinois (8–1) (1)	Eastern Illinois (9–1) (1)	Eastern Illinois (9–1)	Georgia Southern (13–2)	3.
4.	Delaware (1)	Hofstra (1–0)	Furman (1–1) (2)	Furman (1–1) (2)	Furman (2–1) (2)	McNeese State (3–1)	Rhode Island (5–0)	Rhode Island (6–0)	Rhode Island (7–0)	Georgia Southern (7–1) (2)	Eastern Illinois (8–1)	Furman (7–2) (3)	Furman (8–2) (3)	Furman (9–2) (2)	Northern Iowa (11–3)	4.
5.	Appalachian State	Youngstown State (1–0)	Appalachian State (1–1)	Appalachian State (1–1)	McNeese State (2–1)	Appalachian State (3–1)	Youngstown State (4–1)	Youngstown State (5–1)	Youngstown State (6–1)	Hofstra (7–1)	Furman (6–2)	Lehigh (9–0) (1)	Lehigh (10–0) (1)	Lehigh (10–0) (1)	Lehigh (11–1)	5.
6.	Furman (1)	Furman (0–1) (1)	Western Illinois (1–0)	Western Illinois (1–0)	Appalachian State (2–1)	Eastern Illinois (3–0)	Lehigh (4–0)	Grambling State (5–0)	Grambling State (6–0)	Eastern Illinois (6–1)	Western Kentucky (7–2)	Youngstown State (7–2)	Youngstown State (8–2)	Northern Iowa (9–2)	Appalachian State (9–4)	6.
7.	Hofstra	Western Illinois (1–0)	McNeese State (1–1)	McNeese State (1–1)	Western Kentucky (2–1)	Rhode Island (4–0)	Grambling State (4–0)	Lehigh (5–0)	Hofstra (6–1)	Western Kentucky (6–2)	Lehigh (8–0) (1)	Grambling State (8–1)	Northern Iowa (9–2)	Grambling State (9–1)	Sam Houston State (10–3)	7.
8.	Youngstown State	McNeese State (0–1)	Western Kentucky (1–1)	Western Kentucky (1–1)	Eastern Illinois (2–0)	Lehigh (3–0)	Appalachian State (3–2)	Hofstra (5–1)	Lehigh (6–0)	Lehigh (7–0)	Youngstown State (7–2)	Northern Iowa (8–2)	Grambling State (8–1)	Appalachian State (8–3)	Grambling State (10–1)	8.
9.	McNeese State	Lehigh (1–0)	Florida A&M (2–0)	Florida A&M (2–0)	Rhode Island (3–0) (1)	Youngstown State (3–1)	Hofstra (4–1)	Eastern Illinois (4–1)	Eastern Illinois (5–1)	Rhode Island (7–1)	Grambling State (7–1)	Appalachian State (7–3)	Appalachian State (8–1)	Hofstra (9–2)	Eastern Illinois (9–2)	9.
10.	Lehigh	Western Kentucky (0–1)	Lehigh (1–0)	Lehigh (1–0)	Lehigh (2–0)	Grambling State (4–0)	Eastern Illinois (3–1)	Western Kentucky (4–2)	Western Kentucky (5–2)	Youngstown State (6–2)	Northwestern State (7–2)	Hofstra (8–2)	Hofstra (9–2)	McNeese State (8–3)	Maine (9–3)	10.
11.	Eastern Illinois	Florida A&M (1–0)	Eastern Illinois (1–0)	Eastern Illinois (1–0)	Grambling State (2–0)	Western Kentucky (2–2)	Western Kentucky (3–2)	McNeese State (4–2)	Northern Iowa (6–1)	Appalachian State (5–3)	Appalachian State (6–3) (1)	McNeese State (8–3)	McNeese State (7–3)	Western Kentucky (8–3)	Hofstra (9–3)	11.
12.	Florida A&M	Eastern Illinois (0–0)	Rhode Island (2–0)	Rhode Island (2–0)	Hofstra (2–1)	Hofstra (3–1)	Villanova (4–0)	Western Illinois (4–1)	Appalachian State (4–3)	Northwestern State (6–2)	North Carolina A&T (7–1)	Western Kentucky (7–3)	Western Kentucky (8–3)	Youngstown State (8–3)	Western Kentucky (8–4)	12.
13.	Western Illinois	Richmond (0–1)	Richmond (0–1)	Richmond (0–1)	Western Illinois (1–1)	Villanova (3–0)	McNeese State (3–2)	Appalachian State (3–3)	Tennessee State (6–0)	McNeese State (5–3)	McNeese State (5–3)	Northern Arizona (8–2)	Sam Houston State (9–2)	Sam Houston State (9–2)	McNeese State (8–4)	13.
14.	Richmond	Grambling State (1–0)	Hofstra (1–1)	Hofstra (1–1)	Villanova (2–0)	Western Illinois (2–1)	Western Illinois (3–1)	Northern Iowa (5–1)	Sam Houston State (6–1)	North Carolina A&T (6–1)	Tennessee State (7–1)	Sam Houston State (8–2)	Northwestern State (8–3)	Northwestern State (8–3)	Northwestern State (8–4)	14.
15.	Grambling State	Delaware (0–1)	Grambling State (2–0)	Grambling State (2–0)	Eastern Washington (2–0)	Northwestern State (3–1)	Northern Iowa (4–1)	Tennessee State (5–0)	Northwestern State (5–2)	Tennessee State (6–1)	Northern Iowa (7–2)	Rhode Island (7–2)	Villanova (8–2)	Northern Arizona (8–3)	Youngstown State (8–3)	15.
16.	Illinois State	Portland State (1–0)	Villanova (2–0)	Villanova (2–0)	Northwestern State (3–0)	Eastern Washington (2–1)	Florida A&M (4–1)	Sam Houston State (5–1)	Western Illinois (4–2)	Northern Iowa (6–2)	Northern Arizona (7–2)	Northwestern State (7–3)	Northern Arizona (9–2)	Maine (8–2)	Northern Arizona (8–4)	16.
17.	Southwest Texas	Southwest Texas (1–0)	Portland State (1–0)	Portland State (1–0)	Richmond (0–2)	Florida A&M (3–1)	Southwest Texas (4–1)	Northwestern State (4–2)	McNeese State (4–3)	Northern Arizona (6–2)	Rhode Island (7–2)	Villanova (7–2)	Maine (8–2)	William & Mary (8–3)	William & Mary (8–4)	17.
18.	Portland State	Villanova (1–0)	Eastern Washington (1–0)	Eastern Washington (1–0)	Florida A&M (2–1)	Northern Iowa (3–1)	Tennessee State (4–0)	Northern Arizona (5–1)	Maine (5–1)	Penn (6–0)	Sam Houston State (7–2)	Maine (7–2)	Eastern Kentucky (8–2)	Eastern Kentucky (8–2)	Eastern Kentucky (8–2)	18.
19.	Eastern Washington	Rhode Island (1–0)	William & Mary (2–0)	William & Mary (2–0)	Southwest Texas (2–1)	Southwest Texas (3–1)	Sam Houston State (4–1)	Stephen F. Austin (4–2)	North Carolina A&T (5–1)	Sam Houston State (6–2)	Penn (7–0)	Harvard (8–0)	Harvard (9–0)	Harvard (9–0)	Harvard (9–0)	19.
20.	Villanova	Eastern Washington (0–0)	Southwest Texas (1–1)	Southwest Texas (1–1)	New Hampshire (3–0)	William & Mary (3–1)	Northwestern State (3–1)	Villanova (4–1)	Penn (5–0)	Florida A&M (6–2)	Maine (6–2)	Eastern Kentucky (7–2)	William & Mary (7–3)	Villanova (8–3)	Villanova (8–3)	20.
21.	UMass	Illinois State (0–1)	New Hampshire (2–0)	New Hampshire (2–0)	Northern Arizona (3–0)	Portland State (2–1)	Jacksonville State (4–0)	Southwest Texas (4–2)	Northern Arizona (5–2)	Eastern Washington (5–2)	Stephen F. Austin (5–3)	Stephen F. Austin (6–3)	Alabama State (8–2)	Rhode Island (8–3)	Rhode Island (8–3)	21.
22.	Bethune-Cookman	Bethune-Cookman (1–0)	Sam Houston State (2–0)	Sam Houston State (2–0)	William & Mary (2–1)	Tennessee State (3–0)	Northern Arizona (4–1)	Penn (4–0)	Jacksonville State (5–1)	Stephen F. Austin (4–3)	Eastern Kentucky (6–2)	North Carolina A&T (7–2)	Rhode Island (7–3)	Florida A&M (7–3)	Florida A&M (7–4)	22.
23.	Northern Iowa	William & Mary (1–0)	Delaware (0–2)	Delaware (0–2)	Portland State (1–1)	North Carolina A&T (3–0)	Stephen F. Austin (3–2)	North Carolina A&T (4–1)	Florida A&M (5–2)	Western Illinois (4–3)	Villanova (6–2)	Alabama State (7–2)	Tennessee Tech (7–3)	Tennessee Tech (7–3)	Tennessee Tech (7–3)	23.
24.	Wofford	Northern Iowa (1–0)	Northwestern State (2–0)	Northwestern State (2–0)	Delaware (1–2)	Richmond (0–3)	Penn (3–0)	Maine (4–1)	Stephen F. Austin (4–3)	Maine (5–2)	Harvard (7–0)	Tennessee State (7–2)	Florida A&M (7–3)	Penn (8–1)	Penn (8–1)	24.
25.	North Carolina A&T	Wofford (0–0)	Northern Arizona (2–0)	Northern Arizona (2–0)	Tennessee State (2–0)	Sam Houston State (3–1)	William & Mary (3–2)	Florida A&M (4–2)	Bethune-Cookman (5–1)	Eastern Kentucky (5–2)	Alabama State (6–2)	William & Mary (6–3)	Penn (8–1)	Tennessee State (8–3)	Tennessee State (8–3)	25.
	Preseason	Week 1 Sept 4	Week 2 Sept 11	Week 3 Sept 18	Week 4 Sept 25	Week 5 Oct 2	Week 6 Oct 9	Week 7 Oct 16	Week 8 Oct 23	Week 9 Oct 30	Week 10 Nov 6	Week 11 Nov 13	Week 12 Nov 20	Week 13 Nov 27	Week 14 Postseason	
		Dropped: 21 UMass; 25 North Carolina A&T	Dropped: 21 Illinois State; 22 Bethune-Cookman; 24 Northern Iowa; 25 Wofford	None	Dropped: 22 Sam Houston State	Dropped: 20 New Hampshire; 21 Northern Arizona; 24 Delaware	Dropped: 16 Eastern Washington; 21 Portland State; 23 North Carolina A&T; 24 Richmond	Dropped: 21 Jacksonville State; 25 William & Mary	Dropped: 20 Villanova; 21 Southwest Texas	Dropped: 22 Jacksonville State; 25 Bethune-Cookman	Dropped: 20 Florida A&M; 21 Eastern Washington; 23 Western Illinois	Dropped: 19 Penn	Dropped: 21 Stephen F. Austin; 22 North Carolina A&T; 24 Tennessee State	Dropped: 21 Alabama State	None	
